= Arkhangelsk Oblast =

First-level administrative division of Russia

Arkhangelsk Oblast Архангельская область (Russian)
- Oblast
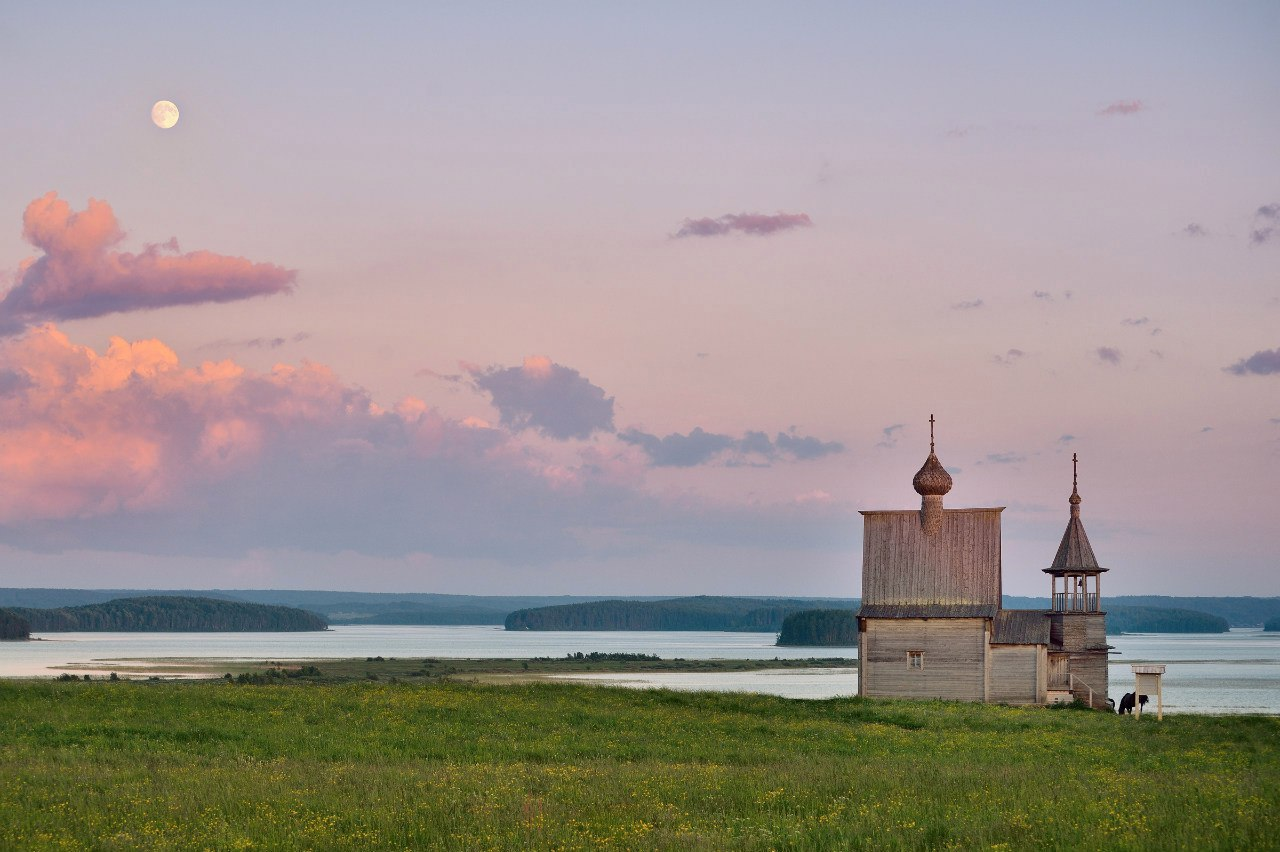
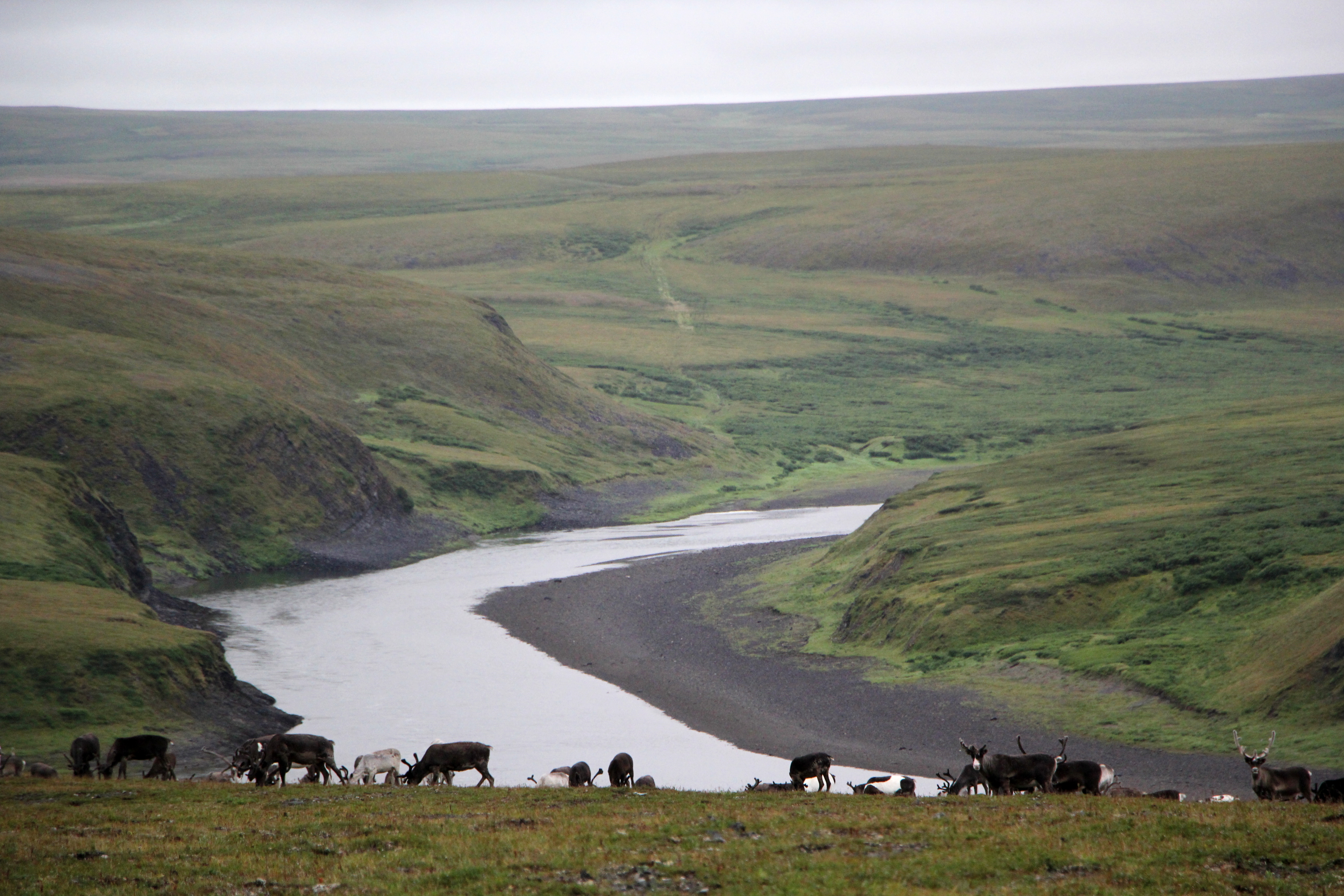
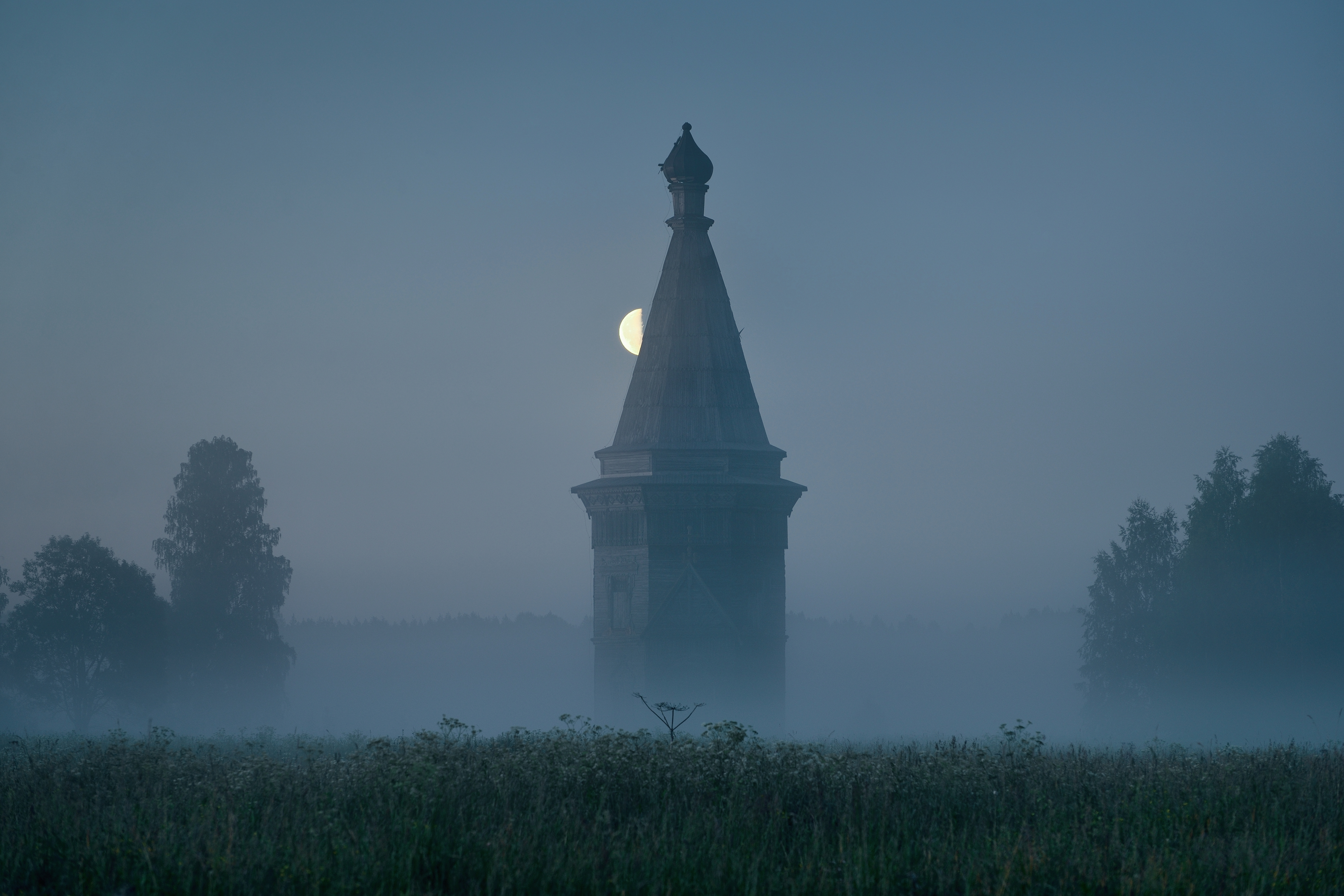
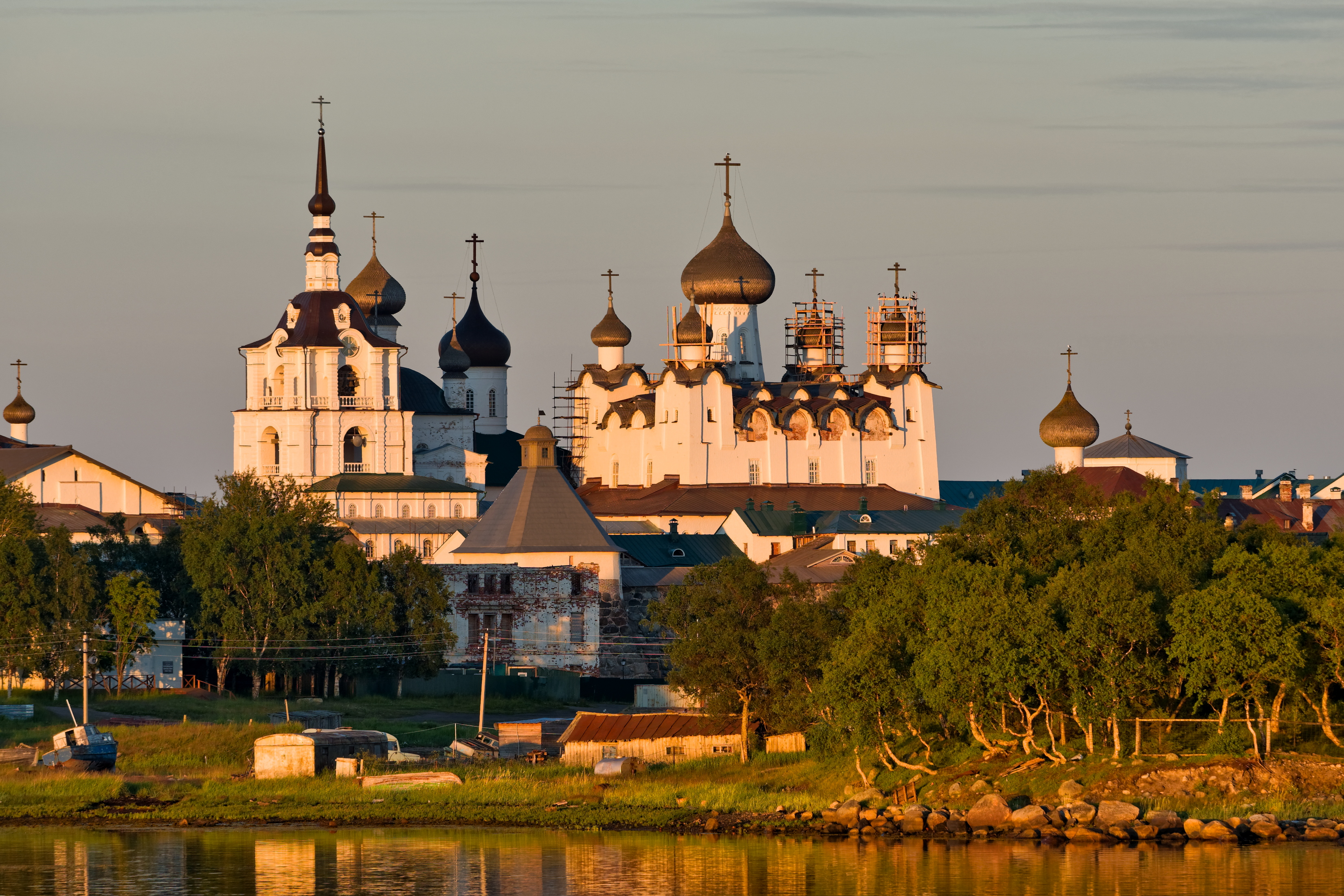
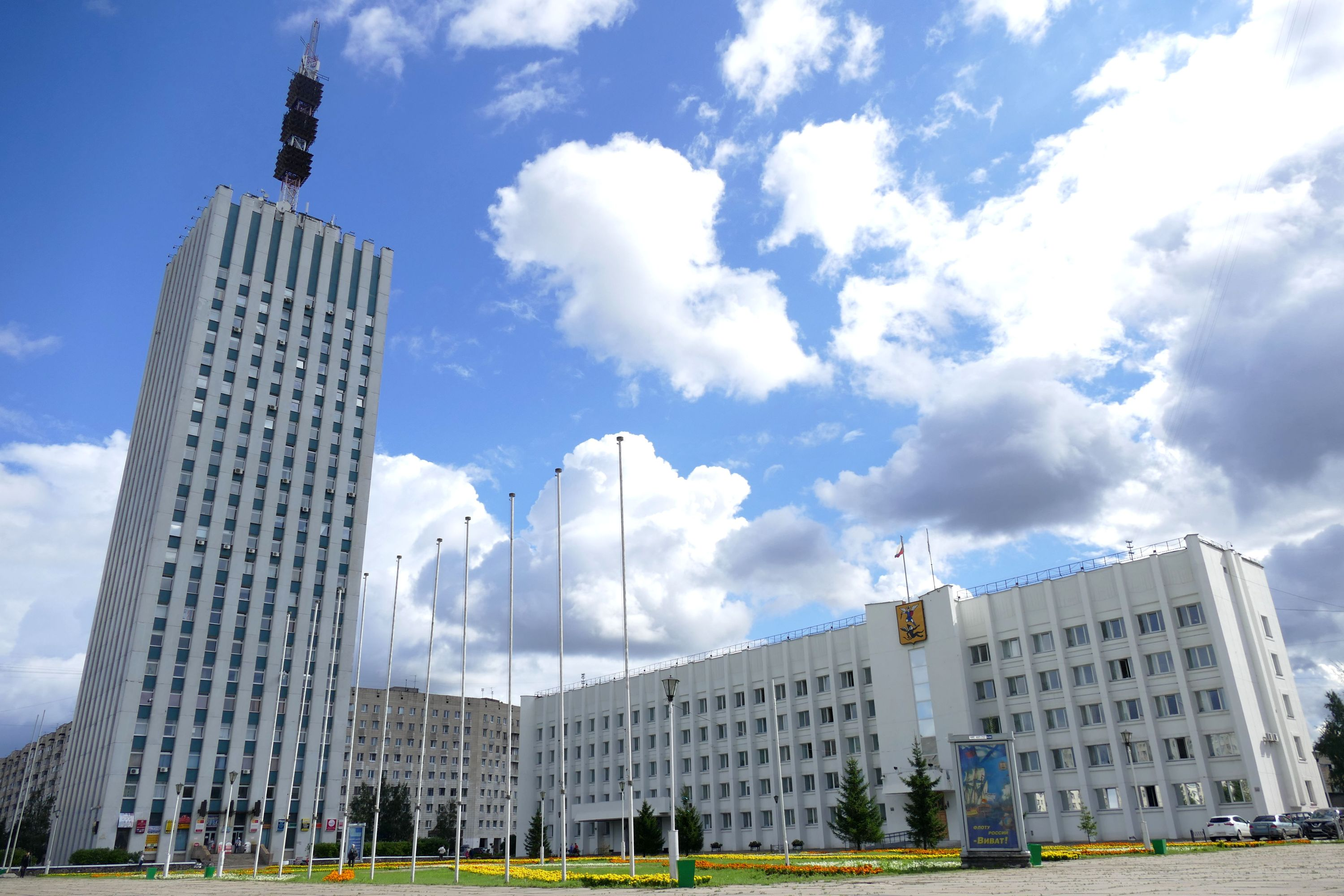
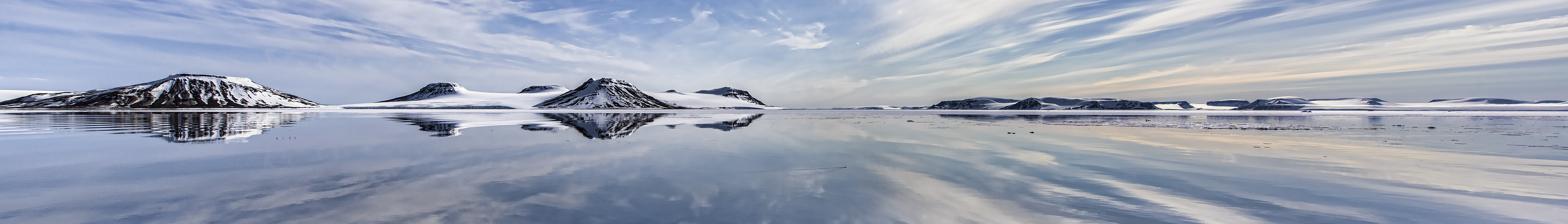
- Top-down, Left-to-right: The Kenozersky National Park; reindeer on the banks of the Kara River; Sretensko-Mikhailovskaya Church in Krasnaya Lyaga; the Solovetsky Islands; the building of design organizations; Franz Josef Land

- Flag Coat of arms
- Anthem: Anthem of Arkhangelsk Oblast
- Arkhangelsk Oblast, with the constituent Nenets Autonomous Okrug highlighted in light red
- Coordinates: 63°30′N 43°00′E
- Country: Russia
- Federal district: Northwestern
- Economic region: Northern
- Established: September 23, 1937
- Administrative center: Arkhangelsk

Government
  - Body: Assembly of Deputies
  - Governor: Alexander Tsybulsky

Area
  - Total: 413,103 km^{2} (159,500 sq mi)
  - Rank: 8th

Population (2021 census)
  - Total: 978,873
  - Estimate (2018): 1,155,028
  - Rank: 53rd
  - Density: 2.36956/km^{2} (6.13714/sq mi)
  - Urban: 77.4%
  - Rural: 22.3%

GDP (nominal, 2024)
  - Total: ₽1.26 trillion (US$14.82 billion)
  - Per capita: ₽1.26 million (US$14,793.01)
- Time zone: UTC+3 (MSK)
- ISO 3166 code: RU-ARK
- License plates: 29
- OKTMO ID: 11000000
- Official languages: Russian
- Website: http://www.dvinaland.ru

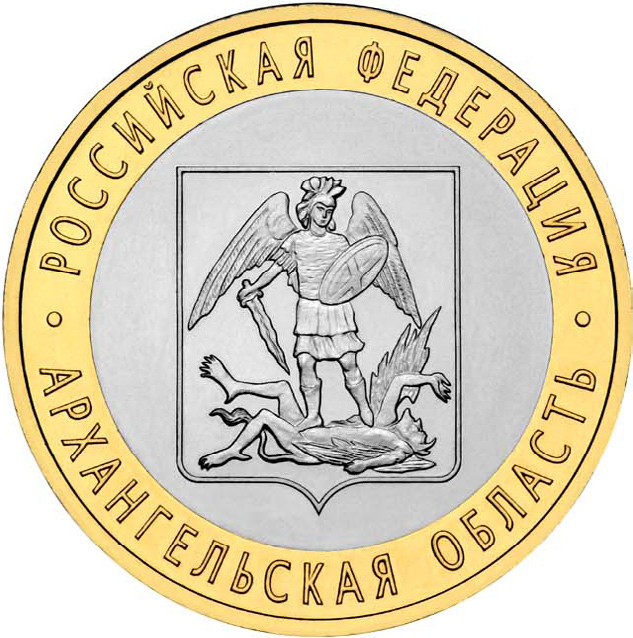
The reverse side of the commemorative 10 ruble coin issued by the Bank of Russia, honoring the federal subjects of the Russian Federation; shown is the 10 ruble coin honoring Arkhangelsk Oblast (2007). Coat of arms of the region on the 10 ruble coin of the Bank of Russia.

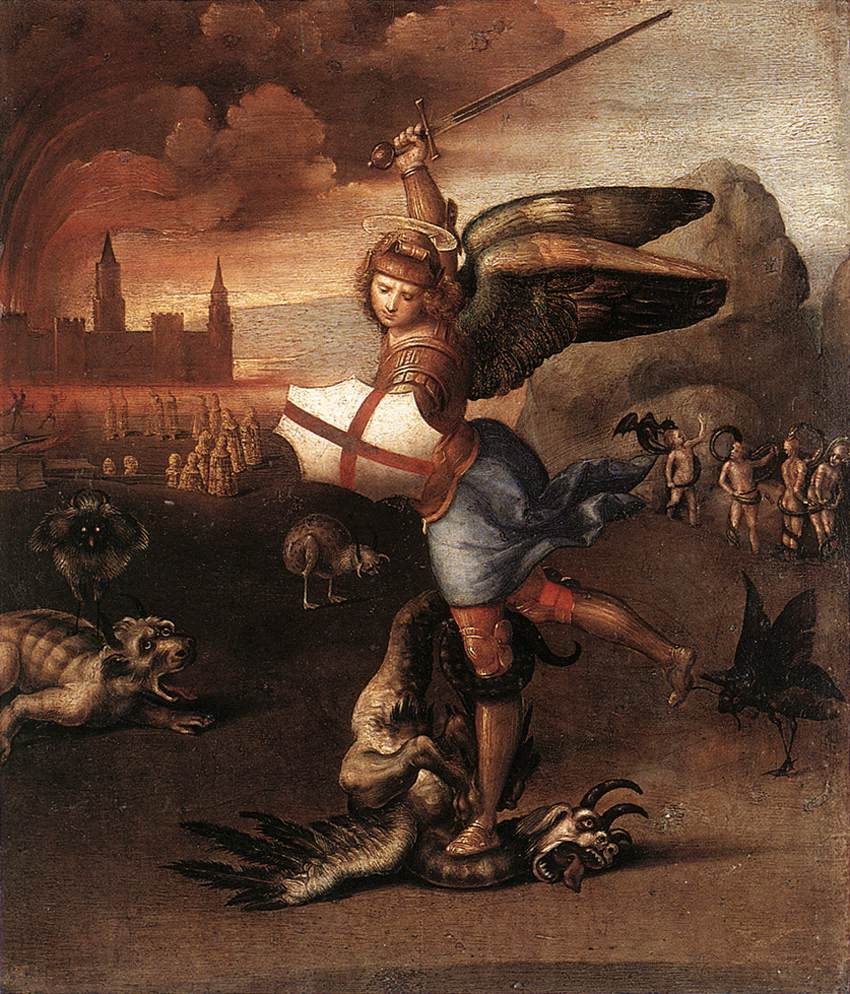
Archangel Michael in a painting by Raphael. The devil being trampled by the archangel is a common attribute of the archangel in both Catholic and Orthodox depictions.

Arkhangelsk Oblast (Note: Russian: Архангельская область, IPA: [ɐrˈxanɡʲɪlʲskəjə ˈobɫəsʲtʲ]) is a federal subject of Russia (an oblast). It includes the Arctic archipelagos of Franz Josef Land and Novaya Zemlya, as well as the Solovetsky Islands in the White Sea. Arkhangelsk Oblast also has administrative jurisdiction over the Nenets Autonomous Okrug (NAO). Including the NAO, Arkhangelsk Oblast has an area of 587,400 square kilometres (226,800 sq mi), it is the largest of first-level administrative divisions in Europe. Its population (including the NAO) was 1,227,626 as of the 2010 Census.

The city of Arkhangelsk, with a population of 301,199 as of the 2021 Census, is the administrative center of the oblast. The second largest city is the nearby Severodvinsk, home to Sevmash, a major shipyard for the Russian Navy. Among the oldest populated places of the oblast are Kholmogory, Kargopol, and Solvychegodsk; there are a number of Russian Orthodox monasteries, including the Antoniev Siysky Monastery and the World Heritage Site of the Solovetsky Islands in the White Sea.

Plesetsk Cosmodrome is one of three spaceports in Russia (the other two are Kapustin Yar in Astrakhan Oblast and Yasny in Orenburg Oblast).

== Geography ==
Arkhangelsk Oblast, which includes the Nenets Autonomous Okrug, borders Kirov Oblast, Vologda Oblast, the Republic of Karelia, the Komi Republic, and the White, Pechora, Barents and Kara Seas. Cape Fligely in Franz Josef Land (the northernmost point of Russia, Europe and Eurasia) and Cape Zhelaniya in Novaya Zemlya (the easternmost point of Europe) are both located within Arkhangelsk Oblast. Mount Kruzenshtern is the highest point of the oblast.

Arkhangelsk Oblast is located on the East European Plain, and most of it is a forested, hilly landscape. The north-eastern part belongs to the Timan Ridge, a highland mostly situated east from the oblast. The Nenets Autonomous Okrug is essentially a flat tundra (Bolshezemelskaya Tundra) with several hill chains like Pay-Khoy Ridge. The Arctic islands including Novaya Zemlya and Franz Joseph Land are mountainous with glaciers and eternally snow-covered. This region has a genetically distinct population of polar bears associated with the Barents Sea area.

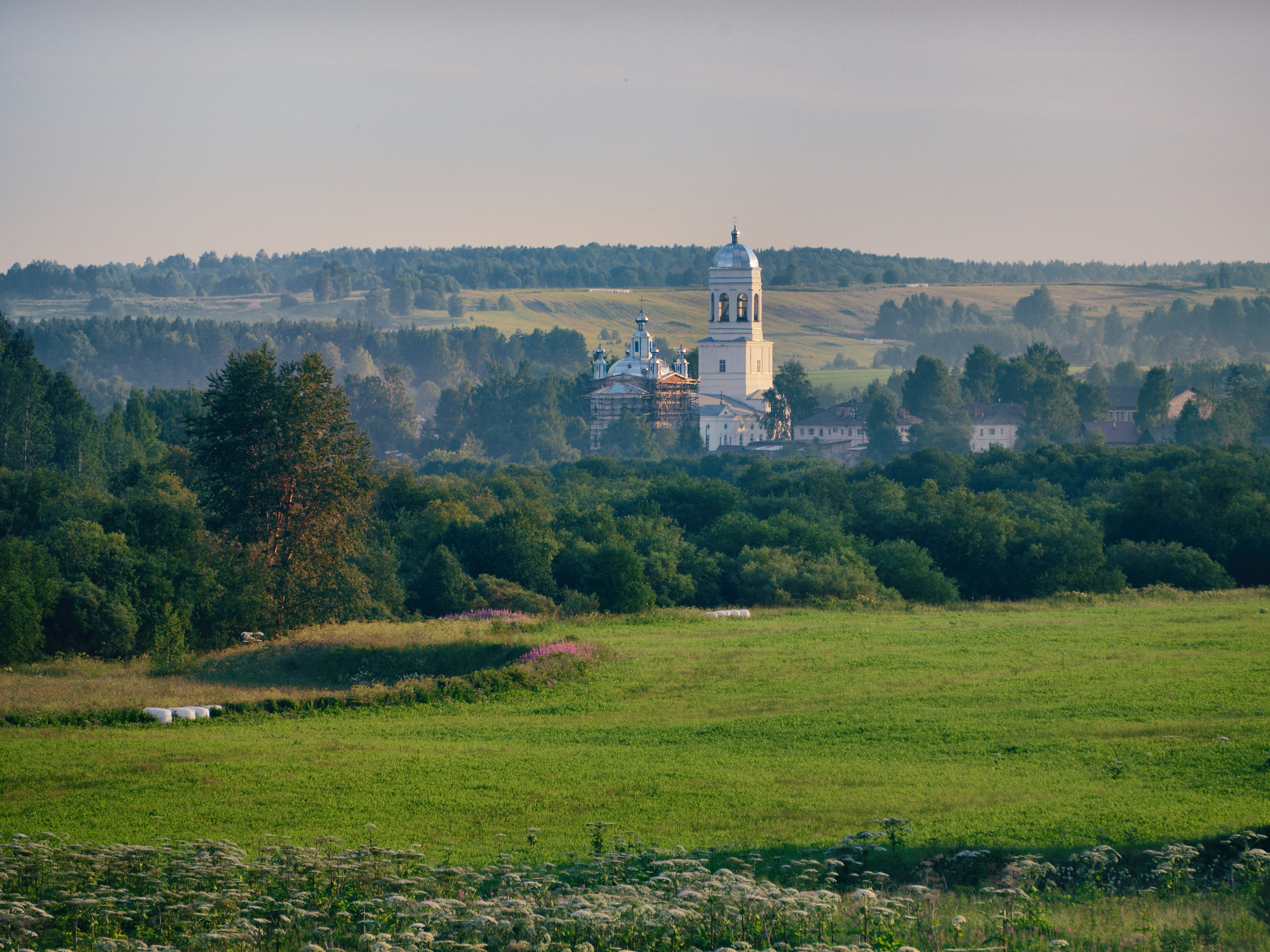
Landscape of Velsky District in Arkhangelsk Oblast

Almost all of the area of the Oblast belongs to the basin of the Arctic Ocean, with the major rivers being the (from west to east) Onega River, the Northern Dvina (with the major tributaries the Vychegda, the Vaga, and the Pinega), Kuloy River, Mezen River, and Pechora Rivers. A minor area in the west of the Oblast, most notably the basin of the Ileksa River, drains into Lake Onega and eventually to the Baltic Sea. A very minor area in Kargopolsky District in the south-west of the Oblast drains into the Kema River which belongs to the basin of the Caspian Sea. The area in the Onega River basin containing the biggest lakes in the oblast, such as Lake Lacha, Lake Kenozero, Lake Undozero, and Lake Kozhozero. The tundra of the Nenets Autonomous Okrug also contains a number of bigger lakes. The river basin of the Pinega is characteristic of the karst, with a number of caves in the region.

The White Sea coast within the Oblast is split into the Onega Bay (where the Onega is the major tributary), the Dvina Bay (the Northern Dvina), and the Mezen Bay (comprising the Mezen and the Kuloy). The Solovetsky Islands, as well as a number of smaller islands, are located in Onega Bay. Onega Bay and the Dvina Bay are separated by the Onega Peninsula. The Mezen Bay is separated from the main body of the White Sea by Morzhovets Island. Other major islands in the oblast include Shogly, Zhizgin, Yagry, Lyasomin, Layda, Nikolskiy, and Mudyugskiy islands.

Almost all of the oblast is covered by taiga, the coniferous forest dominated by pine, spruce, and larch. Large areas in the middle of taiga are devoid of trees and covered by swamps. In the floodplains of the rivers, there are meadows.

A number of areas in Arkhangelsk Oblast have been designated as protected natural areas. These are subdivided into national parks, nature reserves (zapovedniks), and zakazniks of the federal level. The following protected areas have been designated,

- Kenozersky National Park;
- Onezhskoye Pomorye National Park
- Russkaya Arktika National Park (which included previously established Franz Joseph Land Zakaznik);
- Vodlozersky National Park (shared with the Republic of Karelia);
- Pinezhsky Nature Reserve;
- Siysky Zakaznik.

Kenozersky and Vodlozersky National Parks have the status of UNESCO Biosphere Reserve. In addition, there are two protected areas in the Nenets Autonomous Okrug, adjacent to each other: Nenetsky Nature Reserve and Nenetsky Zakaznik.

== History ==
The area of Arkhangelsk Oblast has been settled by Finno-Ugric peoples since prehistoric times, and most of the toponyms in the region are Finno-Ugric. It was subsequently colonized by the Novgorod Republic. Kargopol was first mentioned in the chronicles in 1146, Shenkursk was mentioned in 1315, and Solvychegodsk was founded in the 14th century.

By the 13th century the Novgorodian merchants had already reached the White Sea, attracted to the area for fur trading. The Novgorodians penetrated the area using the waterways, and this is why most of the ancient (as well as the modern) settlements were located into the main river valleys. The main historical areas of the Arkhangelsk region were Poonezhye (Поонежье) along the Onega, the Dvina Land along the Northern Dvina, Pinezhye (Пинежье) along the Pinega, Mezen Lands along the Mezen, and Pomorye (Поморье) on the White Sea coast.

The main waterway was the Northern Dvina, and Novgorod merchants used the Volga and its tributary, the Sheksna, along the Slavyanka River into Lake Nikolskoye, then the boats were taken by land to Lake Blagoveshchenskoye, from there downstream along the Porozovitsa River into Lake Kubenskoye and further to the Sukhona and the Northern Dvina. Portages from the Northern Dvina Basin led further to the Mezen and the Pechora.

After the fall of Novgorod in 1478, all these lands became a part of the Great Duchy of Moscow. Until 1703, the Northern Dvina served as the main export trading route of Muscovy. The local centers were Veliky Ustyug and Kholmogory; however, during the 17th century, Kholmogory lost its significance, and its role was gradually replaced by Arkhangelsk.

In 1708, when the governorates were established by Tsar Peter the Great, Arkhangelsk became the seat of one of the seven governorates of the Russian Empire.

At the same time, Arkhangelsk lands were one of the most remote areas in Russia. This fact was attractive for monks fleeing the crowds. In 1436, Solovetsky Monastery was founded, and it quickly became one of the richest and most influential Russian monasteries. Other monasteries followed. For instance, Kozheozersky Monastery, founded in 1552, still remains one of the most remote Russian Orthodox monasteries. After the great schism in the Russian Orthodox Church in 1653, the area attracted many Old Believers, who were persecuted by the state. Most would later flee to even more remote locations such as Siberia.

In 1703, with the construction of St. Petersburg, Arkhangelsk, which lacked St. Petersburg's geographical proximity to Europe and the non-freezing harbour of Murmansk, lost its significance as the main trading harbour of the Russian Empire. However, in the early 20th century Arkhangelsk was an important starting point for Russian Arctic expeditions. For instance, in the 1830s Pyotr Pakhtusov sailed twice from Arkhangelsk to investigate and map Novaya Zemlya.

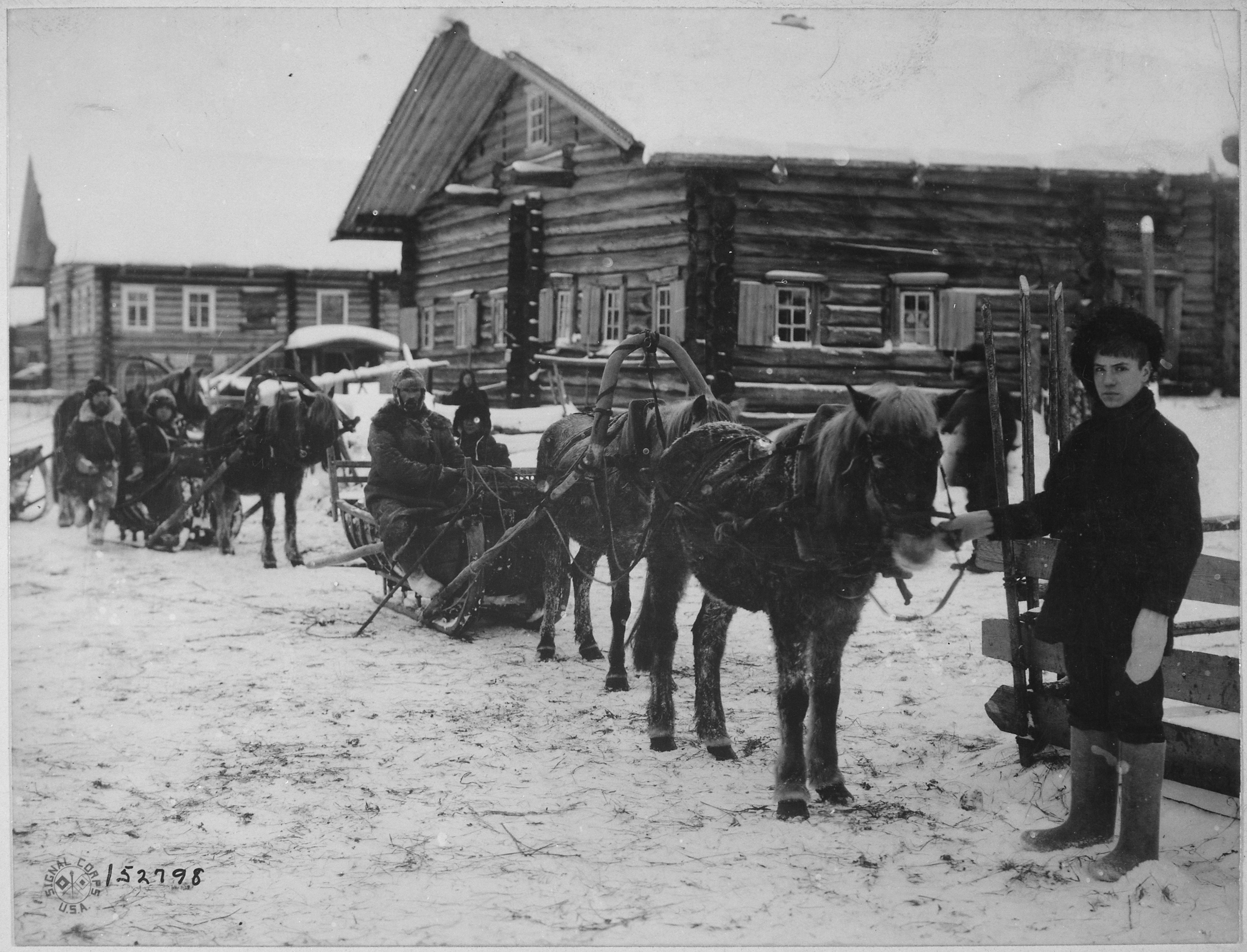
Colonel George E. Stewart, commanding American forces in Northern Russia, passing by convoy through village of Chamovo

In 1918 and 1919, Arkhangelsk Governorate became one of the most active battlegrounds of the Civil War in Russia. On 2 August 1918 Arkhangelsk was occupied by British and American troops, allied with the White movement. Administratively, they established the Northern Oblast with the center in Arkhangelsk. This episode of the Civil War is known as the North Russia Intervention. The troops advanced to the south, occupied the station of Obozerskaya in September 1918, and moving along the Northern Dvina and the Vaga Rivers. The southernmost points occupied by the allies were Shenkursk and Verkhnyaya Toyma. The allies were hoping that the Aleksandr Kolchak's forces would move in the direction of Kotlas, however, the White Army was unable to advance in this direction. In January 1919, after the Battle of Shenkursk, the allied forces were driven out of the Shenkursk area. Battles around the station of Plesetskaya followed. On 20 February 1920 the Red Army entered Arkhangelsk, by which time all allied troops had already been evacuated.

In the 1930s, the Soviets carried out the same experiments in economics as elsewhere in Soviet Union. The peasants and fishermen were forcibly organized into collective farms. These were heavily subsidized, which eventually brought the agriculture to the collapse in the 1990s, when the subsidies stopped. Arkhangelsk Oblast was and remains attractive as an area for exile, forcible resettlement, and prison camps. Actually, the first prison camp, Solovki prison camp, was created in 1920 on the premises of the former Solovetsky Monastery. Novaya Zemlya from the 1950s, when its population (mostly the Nenets) was strongly recommended to leave, became the military ground for nuclear bomb testing.

In 1932, the icebreaker Sibiryakov under the command of Vladimir Voronin, sailing from Arkhangelsk, crossed the Northern Sea Route in a single navigation.

Arkhangelsk Oblast proper was established in 1937. Before 1991, the high authority in the oblast was shared between three persons: the first secretary of the Arkhangelsk Oblast CPSU Committee (who in reality had the biggest authority), the chairman of the oblast Soviet (legislative power), and the chairman of the oblast Executive Committee (executive power). In 1991 the CPSU lost all power. The head of the Oblast administration, and eventually the governor, came to be elected or appointed.

The economic crisis of 1990s, after the fall of the Soviet Union, struck Arkhangelsk Oblast very badly. Although there remains a strong demand for timber, the basis of the oblast's economy, the population of Arkhangelsk Oblast has steadily declined, especially in rural areas. Many villages either have been deserted, or are on the verge of disappearing.

== Politics ==
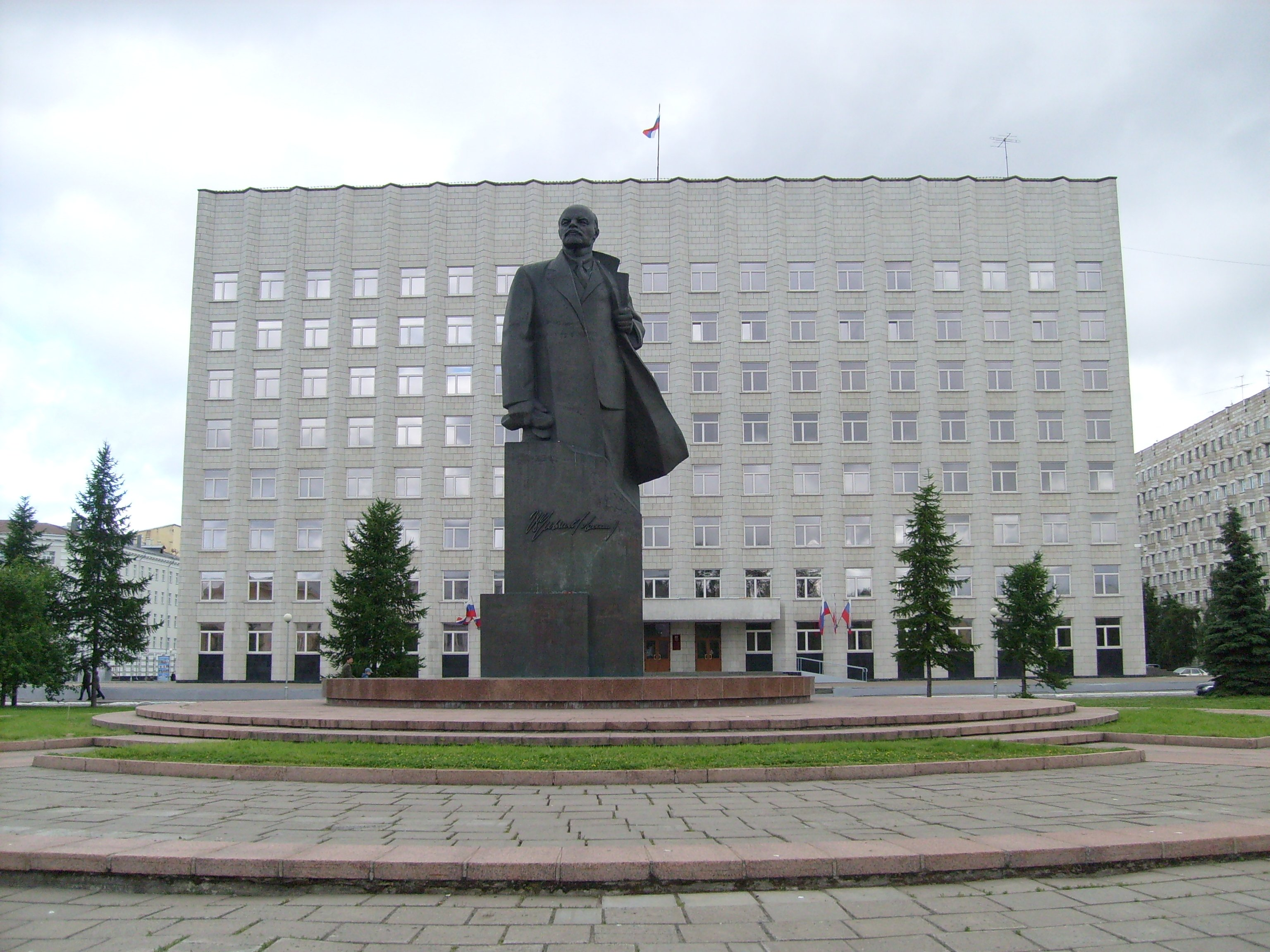
Oblast government seat

During the Soviet period, the high authority in the oblast was shared between three persons: The first secretary of the Arkhangelsk CPSU Committee (who in reality had the highest authority), the chairman of the oblast Soviet (legislative power), and the chairman of the oblast Executive Committee (executive power). Since 1991, CPSU lost all the power, and the head of the Oblast administration, and eventually the governor was appointed/elected alongside elected regional parliament.

The Charter of Arkhangelsk Oblast is the fundamental law of the region. The Legislative Assembly of Arkhangelsk Oblast is the province's standing legislative (representative) body. The Legislative Assembly exercises its authority by passing laws, resolutions, and other legal acts and by supervising the implementation and observance of the laws and other legal acts passed by it. The highest executive body is the Oblast Government, which includes territorial executive bodies such as district administrations, committees, and commissions that facilitate development and run the day to day matters of the province. The Oblast administration supports the activities of the Governor who is the highest official and acts as guarantor of the observance of the oblast Charter in accordance with the Constitution of Russia.

=== First secretaries of the Arkhangelsk Oblast CPSU Committee ===
In the period when they were the most important authority in the oblast (1937 to 1991), the following first secretaries were appointed

- 1937 Dmitry Alexeyevich Kontorin, executed during the Great Purge;
- 1937–1939 Alexander Filippovich Nikanorov, executed during the Great Purge;
- 1939–1945 Georgy Petrovich Ogorodnikov;
- 1945–1948 Boris Fyodorovich Nikolayev;
- 1948–1955 Ivan Sergeyevich Latunov;
- 1955–1960 Savely Prokhorovich Loginov;
- 1960–1967 Konstantin Alexandrovich Novikov;
- 1967–1983 Boris Veniaminovich Popov;
- 1983–1989 Pyotr Maksimovich Telepnyov;
- 1989–1990 Yuriy Alexandrovich Guskov;
- 1990–1991 Anatoly Ivanovich Gromoglasov.

=== Governors ===
Since 1991, governors were sometimes appointed and sometimes elected,

- 1991–1996 Pavel Nikolayevich Balakshin, head of the administration, appointed;
- 1996 Valentin Stepanovich Vlasov, acting head of the administration;
- 1996–2004 Anatoly Antonovich Yefremov, elected;
- 2004–2008 Nikolay Kiselyov, elected;
- 2008–2012 Ilya Mikhalchuk, appointed;
- 2012–2020 Igor Anatolyevich Orlov, appointed;
- 2020– Alexander Vitalyevich Tsybulsky, appointed;

=== Oblast Assembly of Deputies ===
On 8 September 2013, regular elections of deputies to the legislative Arkhangelsk Oblast Assembly of Deputies were held in the region. Election results by party:

- United Russia — 40.66%
- Communist Party of the Russian Federation — 12.89%
- Liberal Democratic Party of Russia — 12.24%
- A Just Russia — 10.50%
- Rodina — 6.18%

The Regional Assembly of Deputies of the sixth convocation began work on 25 September 2013.

Viktor Novozhilov was elected Chairman of the Arkhangelsk Oblast Assembly of Deputies, elected from the Arkhangelsk regional branch of United Russia.

Party factions formed:

- 45 deputies — United Russia faction, headed by Vitaly Fortygin,
- 6 deputies — CPRF faction, headed by Alexander Novikov,
- 4 deputies — LDPR faction, headed by Olga Ositsyna,
- 3 deputies — A Just Russia faction, headed by Tatyana Sedunova,
- 2 deputies — Rodina faction, headed by Vladimir Petrov.

=== Deputies of the State Duma from the oblast ===
The deputies of the State Duma of Russia, as representatives of the Arkhangelsk Oblast and members of the parties of Russia, in the present convocation are:

- Alexander Spiridonov (United Russia party);
- Elena Vtorygina (United Russia faction);
- Olga Yepifanova (A Just Russia party);
- Andrei Palkin (United Russia party).

== Administrative divisions ==
The oblast is administratively divided into six cities and towns under the oblast's jurisdiction (Arkhangelsk, Koryazhma, Kotlas, Novodvinsk, Onega, and Severodvinsk), one city under the federal jurisdiction (Mirny), twenty-one districts (one of which is Novaya Zemlya), and two island territories (Franz Josef Land and Victoria Island). Another six towns (Kargopol, Mezen, Nyandoma, Shenkursk, Solvychegodsk, and Velsk) have the status of the towns of district significance.

Nenets Autonomous Okrug, which is administratively subordinated to the oblast, is administratively divided into one district (Zapolyarny District) and one town of okrug significance (Naryan-Mar).

=== Restricted access ===
Huge areas within the limits of the oblast are included in the border security zone, intended to protect the borders of the Russian Federation from unwanted activity. These restricted areas include all islands in the Arctic Ocean and in Barents Sea, Morzhovets Island, and most of the White Sea coast in Mezensky District. In particular, the area includes the town of Mezen and the urban type settlement of Kamenka. In order to visit the zone, a permit issued by the local FSB department is required.

== Economy ==
=== Industry ===
Arkhangelsk Oblast is one of the industrial regions of Russia. The region has a developed fishery, forestry, woodworking, cellulose, and paper industry. There are large reserves of natural resources: Lumber, oil, bauxite, titanium, gold, manganese, and basalt. In 2011, the paper production and related industries were responsible for 55% of all industrial production of the Oblast, food production – 11%, timber processing (excluding paper production) and furniture production – 12%.

The principal industrial enterprises in Arkhangelsk Oblast are shipyards in Arkhangelsk and Severodvinsk (including Sevmash), pulp and paper mills in Koryazhma and Novodvinsk, and bauxite extraction plant in Severoonezhsk. Almost any town has some timber works.

=== Agriculture ===
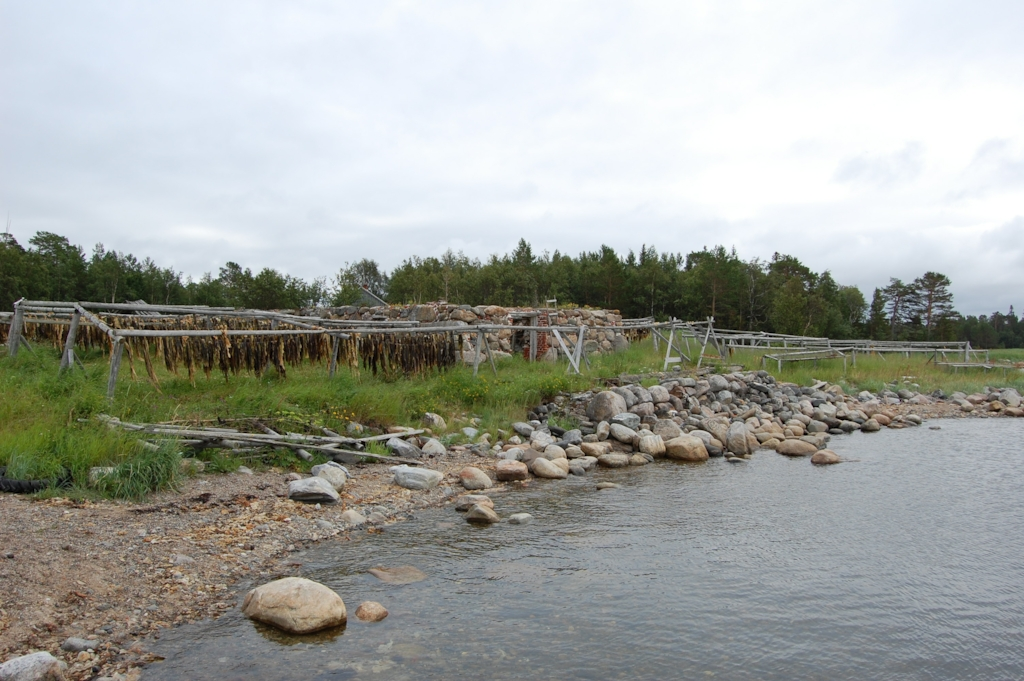
Dried fish in Solovetsky Islands.

Fishery traditionally was the main means of subsistence in the Pomor villages at the White Sea coast. During the Soviet times, the fishermen were organized into collective and state farms (Sovkhoz's) and the fishery was heavily subsidized. In the 1990s the subsidies were stopped, and the fishery went into a serious crisis, some of the villages were deserted.

In the valleys of the main rivers, there is some cattle breeding and crop and potato growing, which is, however, difficult due to the cold climate. Ustyansky District is notable for bee-keeping. Two notable breeds originate from Arkhangelsk Oblast. The Kholmogory cattle, from Kholmogory and Arkhangelsk countryside, mostly black and white, was particularly stable against cold climate in Northern Russia and eventually spread well beyond the Arkhangelsk Region. The Mezen horses, bred in the Mezen River valley, are rather small but suitable for difficult work and easily survive cold winters.

=== Transportation ===
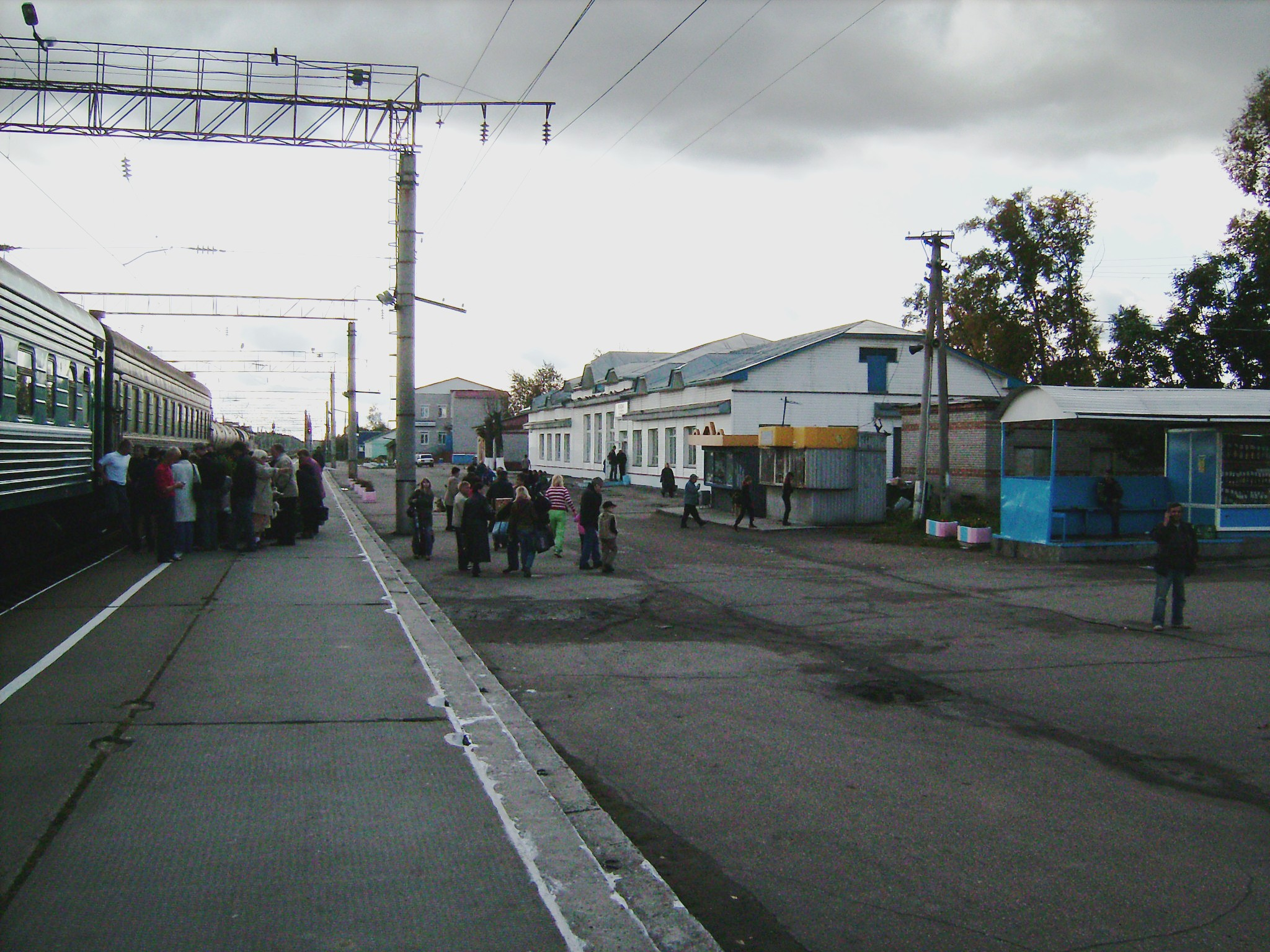
Plesetskaya railway station in the settlement of Plesetsk

The area of current Arkhangelsk Oblast has always been located on the trading routes connecting central Russia to the White Sea, and, in fact, in the 17th century the White Sea was the main sea export route for Russia. The whole course of the Northern Dvina is navigable, as well as the lower course of some of its tributaries, most notably the Vychegda, the Vaga, and the Pinega. The Mezen is also navigable in the lower course. The Onega is not navigable except for the two relatively short stretches because of the rapids. However, except for the lower course of the Vychegda and some parts of the Northern Dvina, there is currently very little or no regular passenger navigation on these rivers. They are used for cargo traffic though.

In 1765, a road was built between Saint-Petersburg and Arkhangelsk, mainly for postal service. The road still exists and passes Kargopol and Plesetsk, and it was paved in 2011. One of the principal highways in Russia, M8, connects Moscow and Arkhangelsk, and passes Velsk. This highway is paved and heavily used. In general, the road network is grossly underdeveloped. Only several all-season highways, in addition to M8, cross the oblast boundaries: the one (partially unpaved) connecting Kotlas with Syktyvkar; the one (paved) connecting Kotlas to Veliky Ustyug and eventually with Vologda and Nikolsk, the one (paved) from Konosha southwards, and two (unpaved) from Kargopol to Pudozh and to Solza and Belozersk. Most of the local roads are unpaved. Until 2008, there were no all-season roads connecting the main road network with the north-east of the oblast, including the town of Mezen and the selo of Leshukonskoye, and there are still no roads into the Nenets Autonomous Okrug, on the left bank of the Onega downstream from Severoonezhsk, and very few roads on the right bank of the Northern Dvina. Many rivers can be crossed only by ferry boats, which means they cannot be crossed during the ice melting period. There is regular bus service on the main roads.

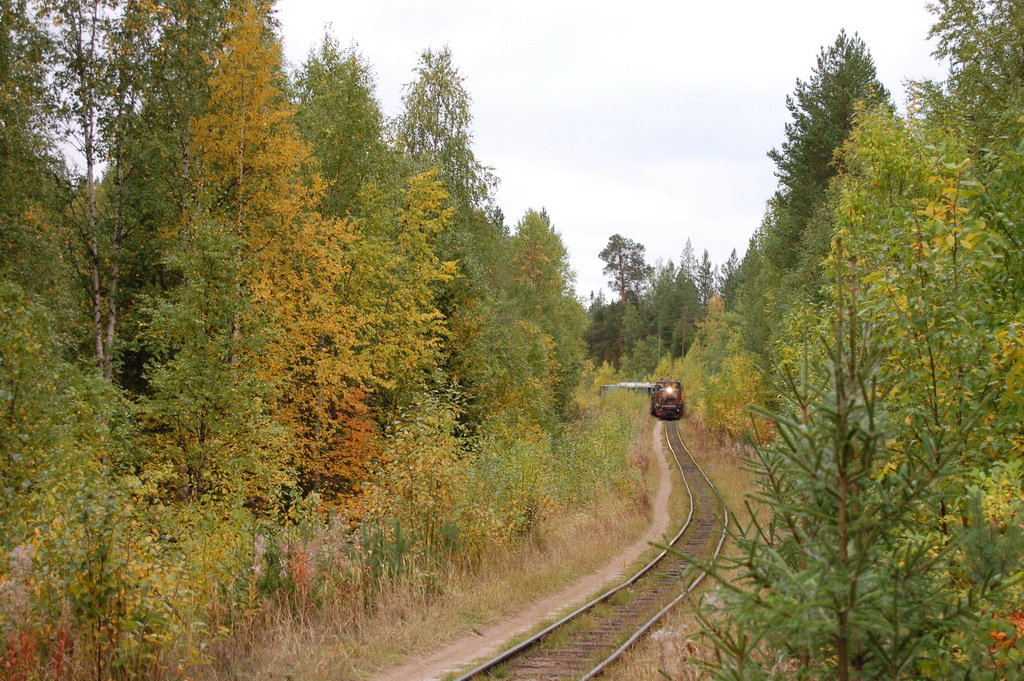
Kudemskaya narrow-gauge railway (2011)

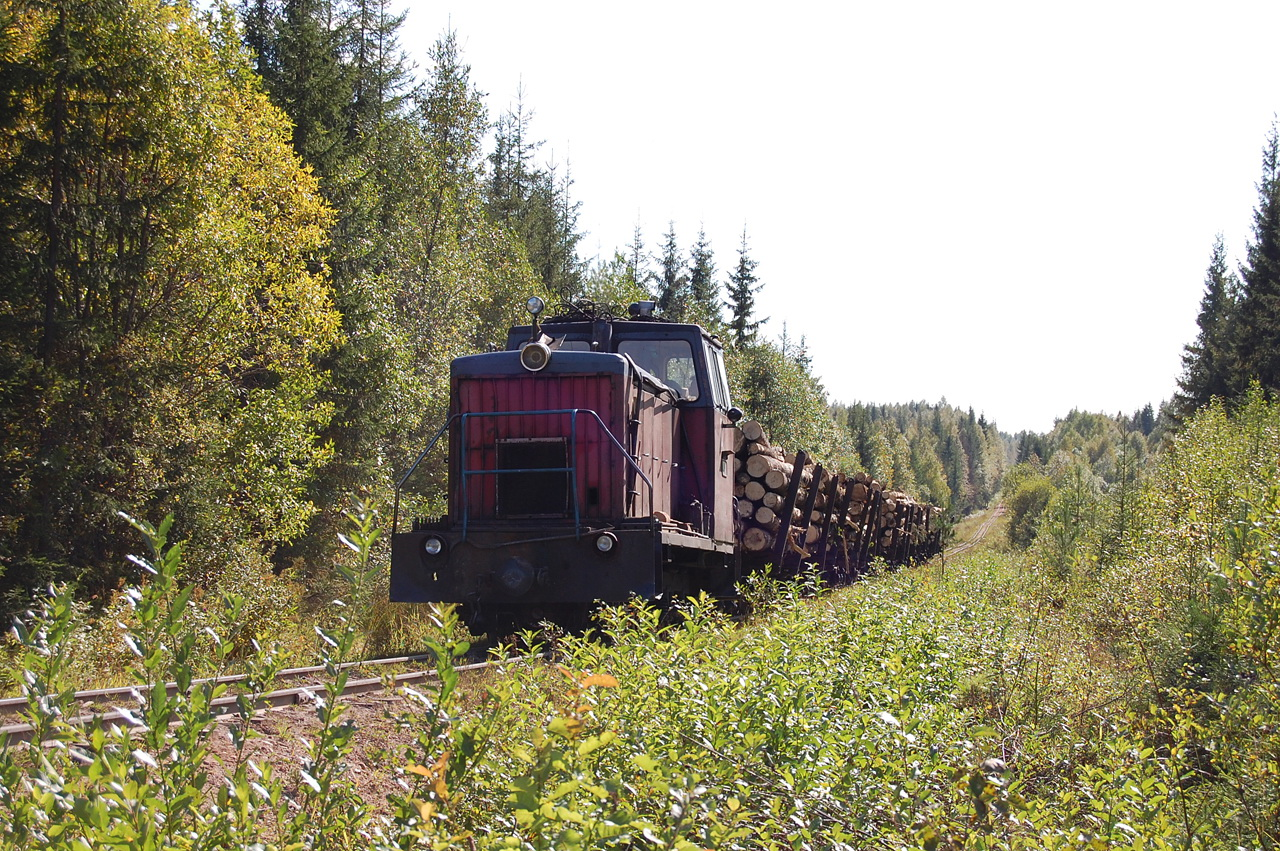
Udimskaya narrow-gauge railway

The principal railway line in the oblast is the railroad connecting Moscow and Arkhangelsk. The piece between Vologda and Arkhangelsk was constructed in 1890s and passed through previously uninhabited areas between the valleys of the Northern Dvina and the Onega. The railroad construction gave the momentum to the population and exploitation of these areas. A branch from Konosha eastwards to Kotlas and further to Vorkuta was constructed in the 1940s to facilitate the transport of coal from the Komi Republic. From Kotlas, another branch continues south to Kirov. A branch from Obozersky to the west, to Onega and further to Belomorsk, was built during World War II to secure the transport of goods from the harbour of Murmansk to central Russia. A piece of railroad between Arkhangelsk and Karpogory was also built in the 1970s and is expected to become part of the Belkomur project — a railway line connecting Arkhangelsk via the Komi Republic with the Perm Krai and the Ural Mountains. Almost the entire rail network belongs to the Northern Railway, which west of Onega connects to the Oktyabrskaya Railway. There is also a railway line from Severoonezhsk west to Yangory (an extension of the line from Puksa to Navolok), which belongs to the Department of Corrections. A large number of narrow-gauge railways were built in the 1950s and 1960s to facilitate the transport of timber, but since then most of these became unprofitable and have been destroyed.

In the 1970s and 1980s the aviation was active, with all district centers connected to Arkhangelsk with regular flights, Kotlas being the second important hub. Currently, it has almost disappeared. There are two airports in Arkhangelsk, but regular local flights are only carried out to the destinations which do not have rail or road connections, such as Novaya Zemlya, Solovetsky Islands, the Nenets Autonomous Okrug, the Onega Peninsula, and the north of the oblast. The exceptions with functioning airports are Mezen, Leshukonskoye, and Onega.

The oil transport system, Baltic Pipeline System, runs through the oblast, with two oil-pumping station located at Urdoma and Privodino.

The Kudemskaya narrow-gauge railway in 2010 has appeared in Forbes ranking, of 10 most beautiful railway routes of the world.

- The Konetsgorskaya narrow-gauge railway for hauling felled logs operates in the Vinogradovsky District.
- The Loyginskaya narrow-gauge railway for hauling felled logs operates in the Ustyansky District.
- The Nyubskaya narrow-gauge railway for hauling felled logs operates in the Kotlassky District.
- The Udimskaya narrow-gauge railway for hauling felled logs operates in the Kotlassky District.
- The Zelennikovskaya narrow-gauge railway for hauling felled logs operates in the Verkhnetoyemsky District.

== Demographics ==
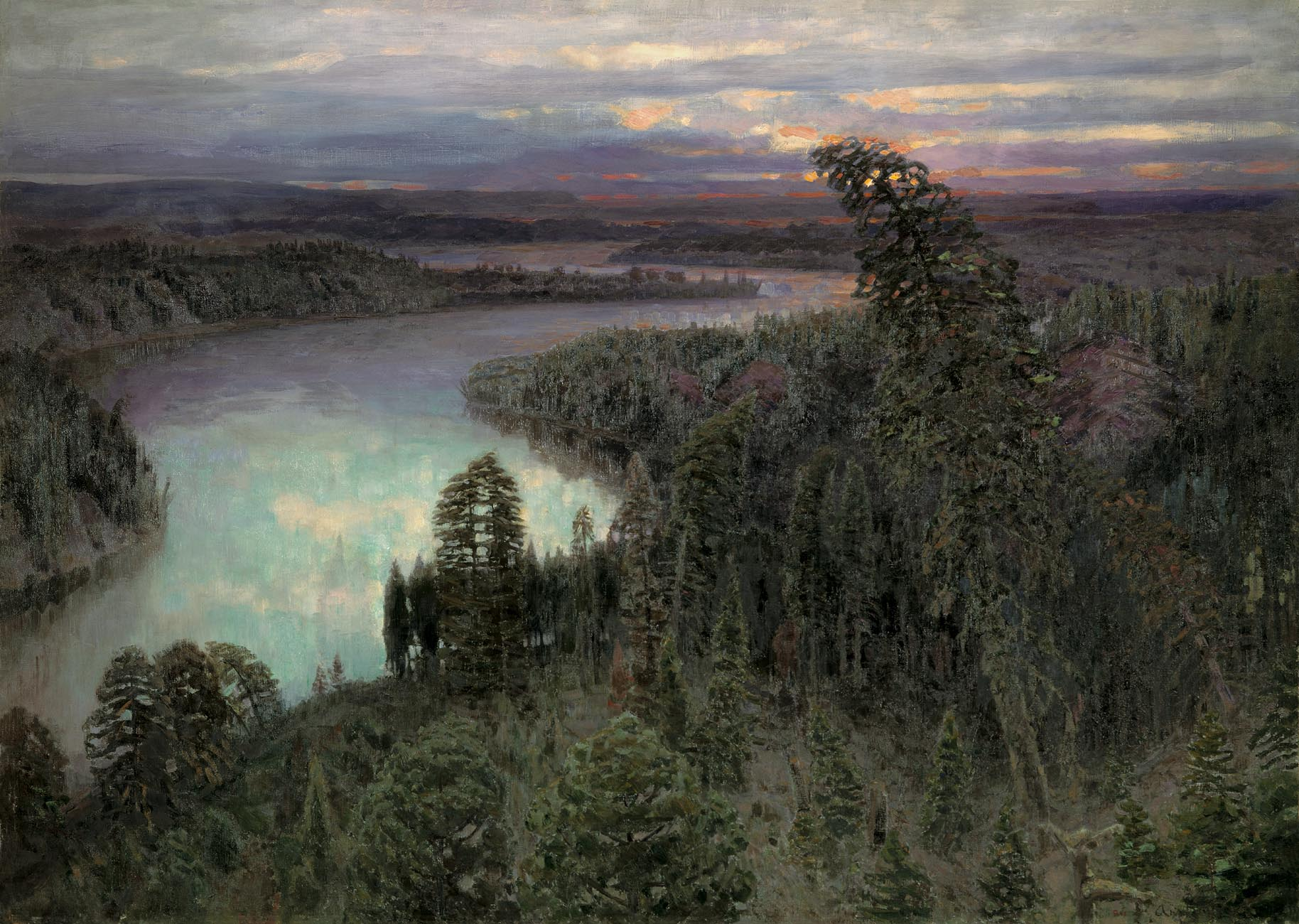
The Northern Land (Apollinary Vasnetsov, 1899)

Historical population
Year	Pop.	±%
1897	346,536	—
1926	429,184	+23.8%
1959	1,230,305	+186.7%
1970	1,362,170	+10.7%
1979	1,420,068	+4.3%
1989	1,515,416	+6.7%
2002	1,294,993	−14.5%
2010	1,185,536	−8.5%
2021	978,873	−17.4%
2025	947,192	−3.2%
Note: incl. Nenets Autonomous Okrug from 1897–1926. Source: Census data, estimate

Population: 978,873 (2021 census); 1,227,626 (2010 census); 1,336,539 (2002 census); 1,570,256 (1989 Soviet census).

Ethnic groups: Arkhangelsk Oblast is very homogenous, with only two recognized ethnic groups of more than two thousand persons each at the time of the 2021 Census. Of those who reported their ethnicity, 97.4% identified as Russian—including 1,297 Pomors—the highest percentage recorded in any federal subject of Russia.

Ethnicities in Arkhangelsk Oblast in 2021
Ethnicity	Population	Percentage
Russians	806,583	97.4%
Ukrainians	4,829	0.6%
Belarusians	1,702	0.2%
Azerbaijanis	1,290	0.2%
Tatars	1,089	0.1%
Other Ethnicities	12,315	1.5%
Ethnicity not stated	151,065	–

Vital statistics for 2024:

- Births: 6,886 (7.2 per 1,000)
- Deaths: 13,795 (14.5 per 1,000)

Total fertility rate (2024):
1.41 children per woman

Life expectancy (2021):
Total — 69.60 years (male — 64.33, female — 75.08)

Fertility rates of the region 2000–2018

	Total fertility rates	Urban fertility	Rural fertility
2000	1.21	1.10	1.65
2001	1.30	1.20	1.73
2002	1.38	1.27	1.89
2003	1.40	1.30	1.88
2004	1.41	1.30	1.90
2005	1.36	1.26	1.75
2006	1.37	1.24	1.89
2007	1.50	1.34	2.14
2008	1.53	1.36	2.22
2009	1.59	1.41	2.34
2010	1.63	1.45	2.45
2011	1.63	1.42	2.83
2012	1.76	1.51	3.47
2013	1.80	1.55	3.81
2014	1.84	1.54	4.26
2015	1.85	1.64	3.96
2016	1.83	1.60	4.47
2017	1.68	1.44	4.39
2018	1.58	1.36	4.68

A notable subgroup of Russian population are the Pomors, who reside along the White Sea coast and in the valleys of major rivers, speak Pomor dialects and are in fact the descendants of the Novgorod population who colonized the Russian North in 12th–13th centuries. In 2002 Census, approximately 6,500 residents of Arkhangelsk Oblast indicated their ethnicity as Pomors.

=== Settlements ===
Largest cities or towns in Arkhangelsk Oblast 2010 Russian Census
Rank		Administrative Division	Pop.
1	Arkhangelsk	City of oblast significance of Arkhangelsk	348,783
2	Severodvinsk	City of oblast significance of Severodvinsk	192,353
3	Kotlas	Town of oblast significance of Kotlas	60,562
4	Novodvinsk	Town of oblast significance of Novodvinsk	40,615
5	Koryazhma	Town of oblast significance of Koryazhma	39,641
6	Mirny	Town of oblast significance of Mirny	30,280
7	Velsk	Velsky District	23,885
8	Nyandoma	Nyandomsky District	22,356
9	Onega	Town of oblast significance of Onega	21,359
10	Vychegodsky	Town of oblast significance of Kotlas	12,861

=== Religion ===
Religion in Arkhangelsk Oblast as of 2012 (Sreda Arena Atlas)
Russian Orthodoxy	29.1%
Other Orthodox	0.7%
Old Believers	0.5%
Other Christians	6.1%
Rodnovery and other native faiths	0.7%
Spiritual but not religious	32.5%
Atheism and irreligion	16.4%
Other and undeclared	14%

According to a 2012 survey 29.1% of the population of Arkhangelsk Oblast adheres to the Russian Orthodox Church, 6% are unaffiliated generic Christians, 1% are Orthodox Christian believers without belonging to any church or members of other Orthodox churches, 1% adheres to the Slavic native faith (Rodnovery). In addition, 32% of the population declared to be "spiritual but not religious", 16% is atheist, and 17.9% follows other religions or did not give an answer to the question.

== Arts and culture ==
=== Architecture ===
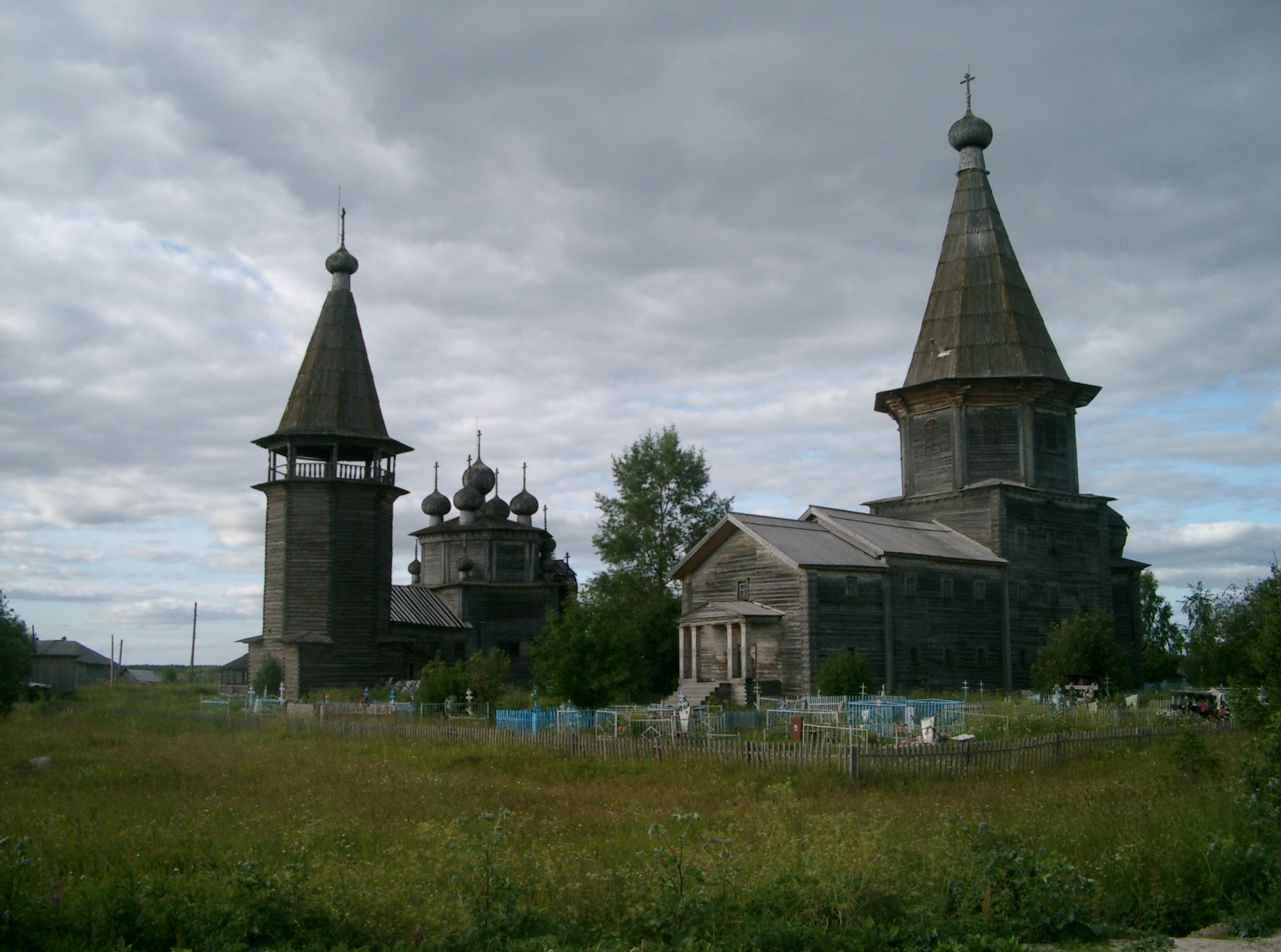
The triple church ensemble in the selo of Lyadiny, Kargopolsky District. In 2013, the bell tower and the Intercession Church (right) burned to the ground.

Arkhangelsk Oblast is famous for its wooden buildings which include churches, chapels, peasant houses and farms, and city houses. The choice of wood as the construction material is natural for a region almost exclusively covered by taiga and still being one of the biggest timber producers. Some of these buildings date from the 17th century. Churches and chapels are considered particularly fine, and almost all of these constructed prior to 1920s have been declared the cultural heritage at the federal or local levels. More than 600 buildings (both of timber and stone) are protected on the federal level. An open-air ethnographic museum was open in the village of Malye Korely close to Arkhangelsk, with the purpose of preserving this heritage.

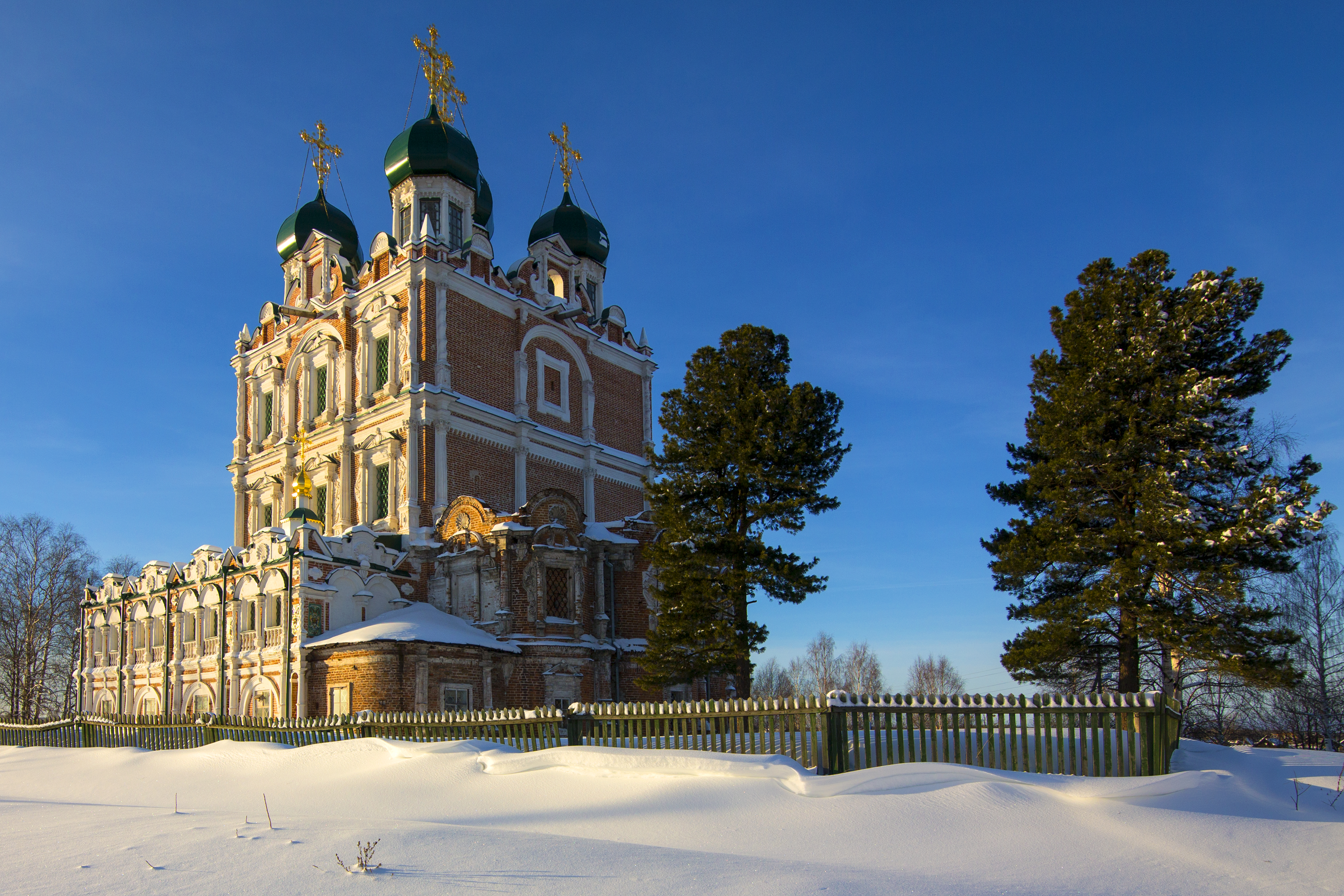
Presentation Church in Solvychegodsk

The most notable wooden churches are triple church ensembles, which consist of two churches (a bigger, not heated, church used in the summer, and a smaller, heated church used in the winter) and a bell-tower. Not more than a dozen of these triple wooden ensembles survived, the best known being the one located in the Kizhi Pogost in the Republic of Karelia and is classified as World Heritage. Most of these ensembles are located in the Arkhangelsk Oblast, in particular, in the villages of Varzogory and Abramovskaya (Onezhsky District). Other notable wooden churches are located in Kargopolsky (Oshevenskoye, Krasnaya Lyaga, Saunino and others), Verkhnetoyemsky (Soyezerskaya Pustyn), Onezhsky, Primorsky, and Plesetsky (Porzhensky Pogost) districts. Despite being listed as cultural heritage, most of these buildings are neglected and regularly burn down. As a matter of fact, the majority of the churches considered as masterpieces has been lost. For instance, Verkhnemudyugsky Pogost in Onezhsky District, a triple church ensemble, burned down in 1997. A church and the bell-tower of the triple ensemble in Lyadiny (Kargopolsky District) burned down on 6 May 2013.

The oblast preserves some of the best stone architectural ensembles in Russia. The ensemble of the Solovetsky Monastery (founded 1436, the earliest surviving buildings stem from the 16th century) has been designated as the World Heritage. The town of Kargopol contains a number of white-stone churches, the earliest of which, the Cathedral of the Nativity of Christ, originates from 1552. The Presentation Church (1688–1712) in Solvychegodsk is an acclaimed baroque masterpiece and one of the five surviving Stroganov baroque churches.

Two of the towns in the oblast – Kargopol and Solvychegodsk – are classified as historical towns by the Ministry of Culture of Russian Federation, which implies certain restrictions on construction in their historical centers.

=== Arts ===
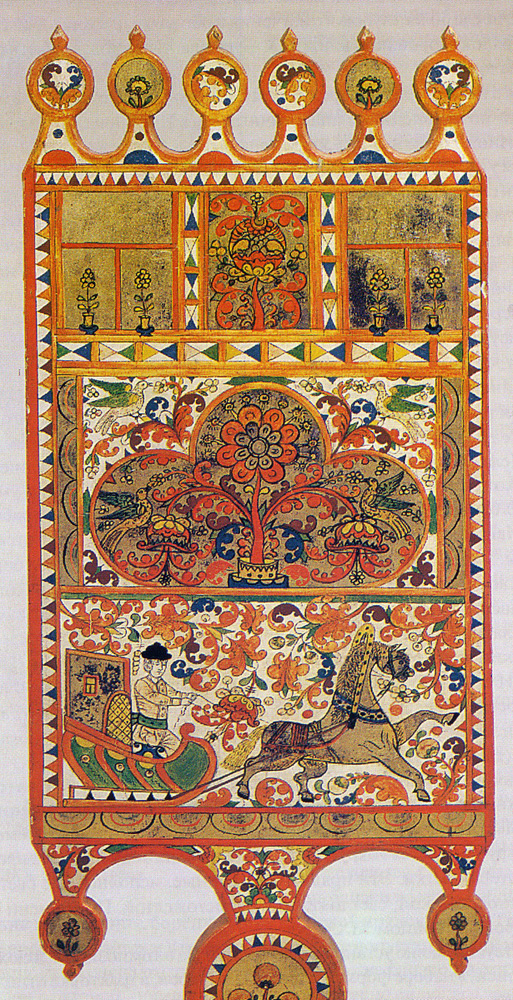
A spinning distaff board from the Nizhnyaya Toyma area featuring traditional tripartite layout

The monasteries facilitated the development of icon painting which existed in the area well until the 19th century. No single unified icon style arose, and icons produced in current Arkhangelsk and Vologda Oblasts are commonly known as Northern icon painting (Северные письма). Icons were produced in Solovetsky, Antoniev Siysky, Kozheozersky and other monasteries, as well as in the towns of Kholmogory and Solvychegodsk. Solvychegodsk icon painting was sponsored by Stroganovs and generated the Stroganov icon painting school, which in the end of the 17th century was principally active in Moscow.

The icon-painting techniques were transferred to the traditional wood painting known since the 17th century in the valleys of the Northern Dvina (Nizhnyaya Toyma, Borok, Puchuga, Permogorye), the Pinega, and the Mezen. It was used to decorate various wooden surfaces such as, for example, spinning distaffs or chests, and employed geometrical figures as well as images of plants, animals, and humans. The Arkhangelsk traditional wooden painting is special since the surface was prepared in a particular way before the painting started, similar to icons.

Despite the fact that several notable Russian artists including Vasily Vereshchagin traveled into the region in the 19th century, professional (non-icon) painting did not develop in Arkhangelsk until the 1890s. Aleksandr Borisov, Stepan Pisakhov, and Tyko Vylka, all of them landscape painters interested in Northern and Arctic landscapes, are considered as the founders of Arkhangelsk painting.

Various handicrafts were developed in the area. The most notable ones are the Kholmogory bone carving, existing since the 17th century, and Kargopol toys, moulded painted clay figures of people and animals.

=== Literature ===
Like other areas of Northern Russia, Arkhangelsk Oblast is notable for its folklore. Until the mid-20th century, fairy tales and bylinas were still performed on a daily basis by professional performers, some of whom, like Mariya Krivopolenova, achieved prominence in Moscow and St. Petersburg. One of the first Arkhangelsk folklore collectors was Alexander Hilferding, who actually died in Kargopol during his journey. Starting from the 1890s, folkloric expeditions were organized to the White Sea area, and later to other areas of the Arkhangelsk Governorate, in order to write down the tales and the bylinas, in particular, in Pomor dialects. In the 1920s, mostly due to the efforts of Anna Astakhova, these expeditions became systematic. The results have been published. By the 1960s, the performing art was basically extinct. However, these folkloric motives and fairy tales inspired the literary works of Stepan Pisakhov and Boris Shergin, who were both natives of Arkhangelsk.

Protopope Avvakum, a 17th-century monk, who led the opposition (raskol) against the reforms of the Russian Orthodox Church, was exiled to Mezen for two years in 1664, and in 1667 was imprisoned in Pustozyorsk, currently in Nenets Autonomous Okrug, for 14 years before being burned alive. Avvakum is an author of about sixty literary works, including the Life of Avvakum, most of which were written in Pustozyorsk and are considered among the most notable Russian literary pieces of the 17th century.

Mikhail Lomonosov, a polymath and poet who created the basis of the modern Russian literary language, was born in 1711 in the village of Denisovka, close to Kholmogory, though he left the area to pursue his studies at the age of 18 and spent most of his career in Moscow and Saint-Petersburg. Denisovka was later renamed into Lomonosovo in his honour.

Aleksey Chapygin, a historical novelist, was born in what is now Kargopol District. His first novels describe the peasant life of the Arkhangelsk Governorate.

In the 20th century, two of the authors of the Village prose movement in Soviet literature, which predominantly described rural life, were tightly connected with Arkhangelsk Region: Fyodor Abramov was born in the peasant family in the village of Verkola in Pinezhsky Uyezd, and Aleksander Yashin lived in Arkhangelsk for some time. In their literary works, as well as in the works of Yury Kazakov, a short story writer who traveled extensively in the Russian North, the life of Arkhangelsk peasants features prominently. The name of one of the Kazakov's books of short stories is Poedemte v Lopshengu — Let us go to Lopshenga; Lopshenga is a selo on the White Sea coast.

Some of the Nenets authors lived in Nenets Autonomous Okrug. In particular, Tyko Vylka was born in Novaya Zemlya and was even the chairman of the Novaya Zemlya Island Soviet. Vasily Ledkov lived in Naryan Mar.

== Sports ==
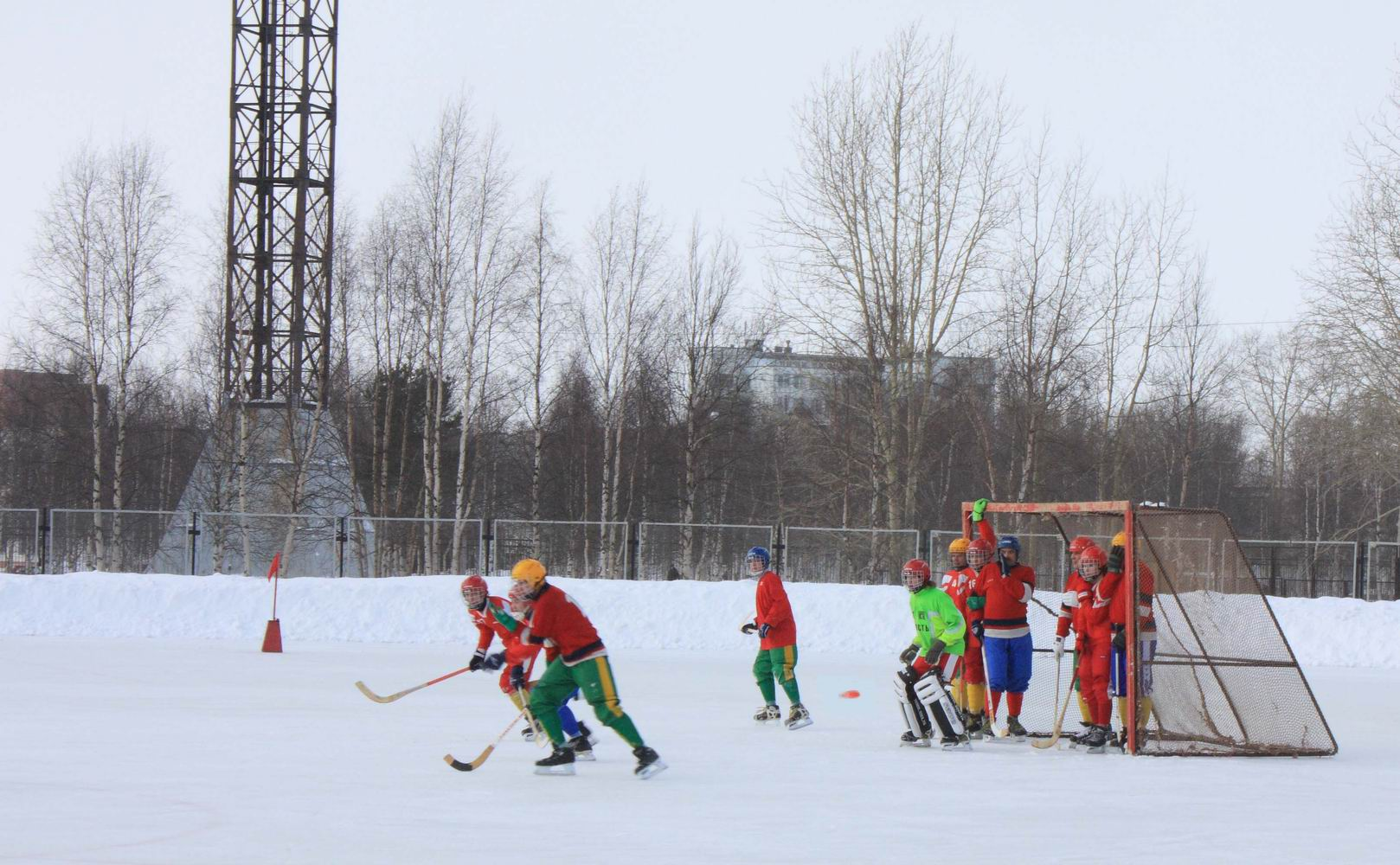
Arkhangelsk Oblast Junior Bandy Championships

One sport in which the oblast achieved prominence is bandy. The Vodnik Bandy Club from Arkhangelsk has become the Russian champion nine times (1996–2000 and 2002–2005) and won the Bandy World Cup in 2003 and 2004. Arkhangelsk hosted the 1999 Bandy World Championship and the same in 2003.

== Emergency handling ==
In 1998, the Arkhangelsk Regional Rescue Service was established by the governor. The responsibility of the Rescue Service is to handle emergency situations, such as forest fires.

Polar bears are entering into human-occupied areas more frequently than in the past due to climate change effects. Global warming reduces sea-ice, forcing bears to come in to land to find food. An invasion of polar bears took place in February 2019 in northeastern Novaya Zemlya, with dozens of polar bears seen entering homes, public buildings, and inhabited areas. Arkhangelsk regional authorities declared a state of emergency.
