= Chamovo =

Chamovo Чамово
- Village
- Location within Arkhangelsk Oblast Location within Russia
- Coordinates: 62°43′N 43°09′E
- Country: Russia
- Region: Arkhangelsk Oblast
- District: Vinogradovsky District
- Time zone: UTC+3:00

Chamovo (Russian: Чамово) is a rural locality (a village) in Shidrovskoye Rural Settlement of Vinogradovsky District, Arkhangelsk Oblast, Russia. The population was 40 as of 2010.

== Geography ==
Chamovo is located on the Severnaya Dvina River, 39 km southeast of Bereznik (the district's administrative centre) by road.
