= Anthem of Arkhangelsk Oblast =

Gimn Arhangeljskoj oblasti
English: Anthem of the Arkhangelsk Oblast
- Гимн Архангельской области
- Coat of arms of Arkhangelsk Oblast
- Regional anthem of Arkhangelsk Oblast
- Lyrics: Nina Meshko
- Music: Nina Meshko
- Adopted: 31 October 2007

Audio sample
- file; help

The Anthem of Arkhangelsk Oblast (Note: Russian: Гимн Архангельской области, romanized: Gimn Arhangeljskoj oblasti, IPA: [ɡʲimn ɐrˈxanɡʲɪlʲskəj ˈobɫəsʲtʲɪ]) is the official anthem used by the Arkhangelsk Oblast, a federal subject of the Russian Federation. It was approved by the Arkhangelsk Regional Assembly on 31 October 2007, and the author of the lyrics and composer of the anthem's music is Nina Konstantinovna Meshko.

== Lyrics ==
Russian original

Cyrillic script

I
Край наш поморский
Могуч и прекрасен!
Его не забудешь вовек.
Манят отважных
Бескрайние дали,
Где не ступал человек!

II
Здесь по Петрову
Веленью из моря
Ряд белокрылых
Фрегатов восстал.
И колыбелью Российского флота
Край наш Архангельский стал.

III
Здесь Ломоносов
Великий родился,
Мудростью мир осветил,
Былинные сказы,
Загадки природы
В научную быль воплотил.

IV
Край наш поморский
В движении и силе,
Ему по плечу Новый век!
Космос, богатства,
Глубины морские —
Всё покорит человек!

Latin script

I
Kraj naš pomorskij
Moguč i prekrasen!
Jego ne zabudešj vovek.
Manjat otvažnyh
Beskrajnije dali,
Gde ne stupal čelovek!

II
Zdesj po Petrovu
Veleniu iz morja
Rjad belokrylyh
Fregatov vosstal.
I kolybeliu Rossijskogo flota
Kraj naš Arhangeljskij stal.

III
Zdesj Lomonosov
Velikij rodilsja,
Mudrostiu mir osvetil,
Bylinnyje skazy,
Zagadki prirody
V naučnuju bylj voplotil.

IV
Kraj naš pomorskij
V dviženii i sile,
Jemu po pleču Novyj vek!
Kosmos, bogatstva,
Glubiny morskije —
Vsjo pokorit čelovek!

IPA transcription

1
[kraj naʂ pɐ.ˈmor.sʲkʲɪj]
[mɐ.ˈɡutɕ i prʲɪ.ˈkra.sʲɪn ‖]
[jɪ.ˈvo nʲe zɐ.ˈbu.dʲɪʐ vɐ.ˈvʲek ‖]
[mɐ.ˈnʲat ɐ.ˈtvaʐ.nɨx]
[bʲɪs.ˈkraj.nʲɪ.je ˈda.lʲɪ |]
[ɡdʲe nʲe stʊ.ˈpaɫ tɕɪ.ɫɐ.ˈvʲek ‖]

2
[zʲdʲesʲ po pʲɪ.ˈtro.vʊ]
[vʲɪ.ˈlʲenʲ.jʊ iz ˈmo.rʲə]
[rʲad bʲɪ.ɫɐ.ˈkrɨ.ɫɨx]
[frʲɪ.ˈɡa.təv vɐs.ˈstaɫ ‖]
[i kə.ɫɨ.ˈbʲelʲ.jʊ rɐ.ˈsʲij.skə.və ˈfɫo.tə]
[kraj naʂ ɐr.ˈxan.ɡʲɪlʲ.skʲɪj staɫ ‖]

3
[zʲdʲesʲ ɫə.mɐ.ˈno.səf]
[vʲɪ.ˈlʲi.kʲɪj rɐ.ˈdʲiɫ.s⁽ʲ⁾ə |]
[ˈmu.drəsʲtʲ.jʊ mʲir ɐ.svʲɪ.ˈtʲiɫ |]
[bɨ.ˈlʲin.nɨ.je ˈska.zɨ |]
[zɐ.ˈɡat.kʲɪ prʲɪ.ˈro.dɨ]
[v nɐ.ˈutɕ.nʊ.jʊ bɨlʲ və.pɫɐ.ˈtʲiɫ ‖]

4
[kraj naʂ pɐ.ˈmor.sʲkʲɪj]
[v dvʲɪ.ˈʐɛ.nʲɪ.ɪ i ˈsʲi.lʲe |]
[jɪ.ˈmu po plʲɪ.ˈtɕu ˈno.vɨj vʲek ‖]
[ˈkos.məs | bɐ.ˈɡats.tvə |
[ɡɫʊ.ˈbʲi.nɨ mɐr.ˈskʲi.je |]
[fsʲo pə.kɐ.ˈrʲit tɕɪ.ɫɐ.ˈvʲek ‖]

English translation

I
Our land by the sea
Is beautiful and great!
Once seen, it won't leave your mind.
The fearless are called
By its boundless expanse,
Where no person has stepped before!

II
Here, from the sea,
By the will of Peter the Great,
A row of white-winged
Frigates arose.
And so the birthplace of the Russian Navy
Became our home of Arkhangelsk.

III
This is the homeland
Of the great Lomonosov;
He brought the light of knowledge to the world,
The tales of old
And the mysteries of nature
He transformed into scientific realities.

IV
Our land by the sea
Is strong and constantly moving,
And can handle the challenges that come!
Outer space, nature's treasures,
And the depths of the sea —
All of these can be conquered by man!
