= Arkhangelsk Regional Rescue Service =

Coordinates: 64°31′39″N 40°34′25″E

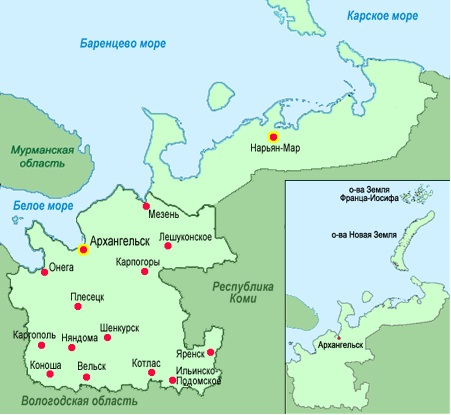
Area of the ARRS

The Arkhangelsk Regional Rescue Service (ARRS) was founded by the governor of Arkhangelsk Oblast, Russia on 6 April 1998 to provide emergency assistance and preparedness in dealing with a variety of emergency situations. It operates under the jurisdiction of the Agency for Fire Protection and Civil Defence of Arkhangelsk Oblast and is a component in the Russian system of search and rescue. The head of the ARRS in 1998-2013 was Igor Polivany. June 24, 2013, after a long and serious illness, Igor Polivany died. In gratitude for his contribution to the development of Search and Rescue in Russia, the memory of this unique man and professional was immortalized: Arkhangelsk Regional Rescue Service was named after Igor Polivany. The Head of the ARRS is Michael Napolskih.

== Organisation ==
- Financial department
- Response department
  - Specialized Search and rescue brigade
  - Emergency call centre 112
  - Canine department
- Operations technical support department
  - Communications department
  - Transport department
  - Special equipment department
  - Managerial department
- Service activities department
  - Human resources department
  - Special defence department
  - Medical department
- Training centre

== Emergency call centre ==
Specialists at the emergency call centre co-ordinate the participation of the search and rescue brigade in actual and simulated rescue operations and cooperate with other emergency organizations in the Arkhangelsk region 24 hours a day. Since its inception, the ARRS has received more than 2 million calls from the population and organisations for a variety of emergency situations. One of the most important functions of the emergency call centre is guiding (by telephone) people who become lost in the forest. From 2004 to 2018, nearly 2,000 people were guided out of the forest.

== Rescue operations ==
Members of the ARRS have considerable experience in rescue missions, including fire fighting, rescuing survivors after plane crashes, mitigation of large-scale chemical accidents and explosions of the blocks of flats. Since 1998, the SAR brigades of the ARRS have conducted almost 64,000 rescue operations; more than 8,000 people were rescued.

In 2007, an Aviation Rescue Swimmer division was established in ARRS in order to help the injured on sea. Specialized training programmes for rescue swimmers are based on the best practices of American and Norwegian rescue services. The aviation rescue swimmers division of ARRS is the only such unit in the northwest of Russia.

== Hazmat response ==
Members of the special defence section assess of the impact of chemical, biological and radioactive contamination, using measuring devices to control the level of hazardous materials in the environment. In addition, specialists in this section participate in rescue operations in chemical accidents. Since 2006, the ARRS has mitigated dangerous substances. Decontamination services were not provided in the Arkhangelsk region before the formation of the ARRS. From 2006, specialists of the ARRS mitigated adverse effects from 46 damaged methyl bromide cylinders, 1820 chlorine cylinders, 800 liquid chlorine containers, 29 ammonia cylinders, 7.5 tons compressed and ammonia gas from refrigeration equipment, 5 acetylene, 5 hydrogen cylinders, and 5 methane cylinder.

ARRS is the only emergency organisation in the northwest of Russia certified for providing Hazmat activities concerning with leaks, emissions, and spills of chemicals.

The rescuers of ARRS conduct Hazmat activities not only within the Arkhangelsk Oblast. In September 2011, they drove over 3,5000 km from Arkhangelsk to Nyagan (Khanty-Mansi Autonomous Okrug) in order to eliminate a storage of liquefied chlorine.

== Canine brigade ==
At the end of September 2003, two German shepherd puppies were selected for training. In June 2005, the dogs were certified as ready to provide rescue missions by passing two tests: searching for survivors in an inhabited area and in the forest. The same year, they were awarded the bronze medal in the EMERCOM regional Russian competition for SAR canine brigades. In 2018, the five canine brigades of the ARRS were re-certified Class A at the certification competition.

== Psychological assistance ==
Psychologists in the ARRS provide emergency psychological assistance to the population by telephone. If necessary, they join rescuers to provide psychological assistance to potential suicides and work with relatives of accident victims or people lost in the forest. The psychologists' conclusions concerning a person lost in the forest help rescuers decide on a search strategy.

== Public-safety education ==
Specialists in the ARRS have developed and implemented preventive lectures on safety for the student population of the Arkhangelsk region. Audiences vary, from children 5–6 years of age to students at higher-educational institutions. Based on these presentations, the ARRS has developed two additional education programmes: a “Safety School” focused on children with cognitive impairment, and “Five Steps of Safety”, adapted for older preschool children. At the 2008 and 2009 Moscow exhibitions "Fire Safety in the 21st Century", specialists in the ARRS were awarded certificates and gold medals.

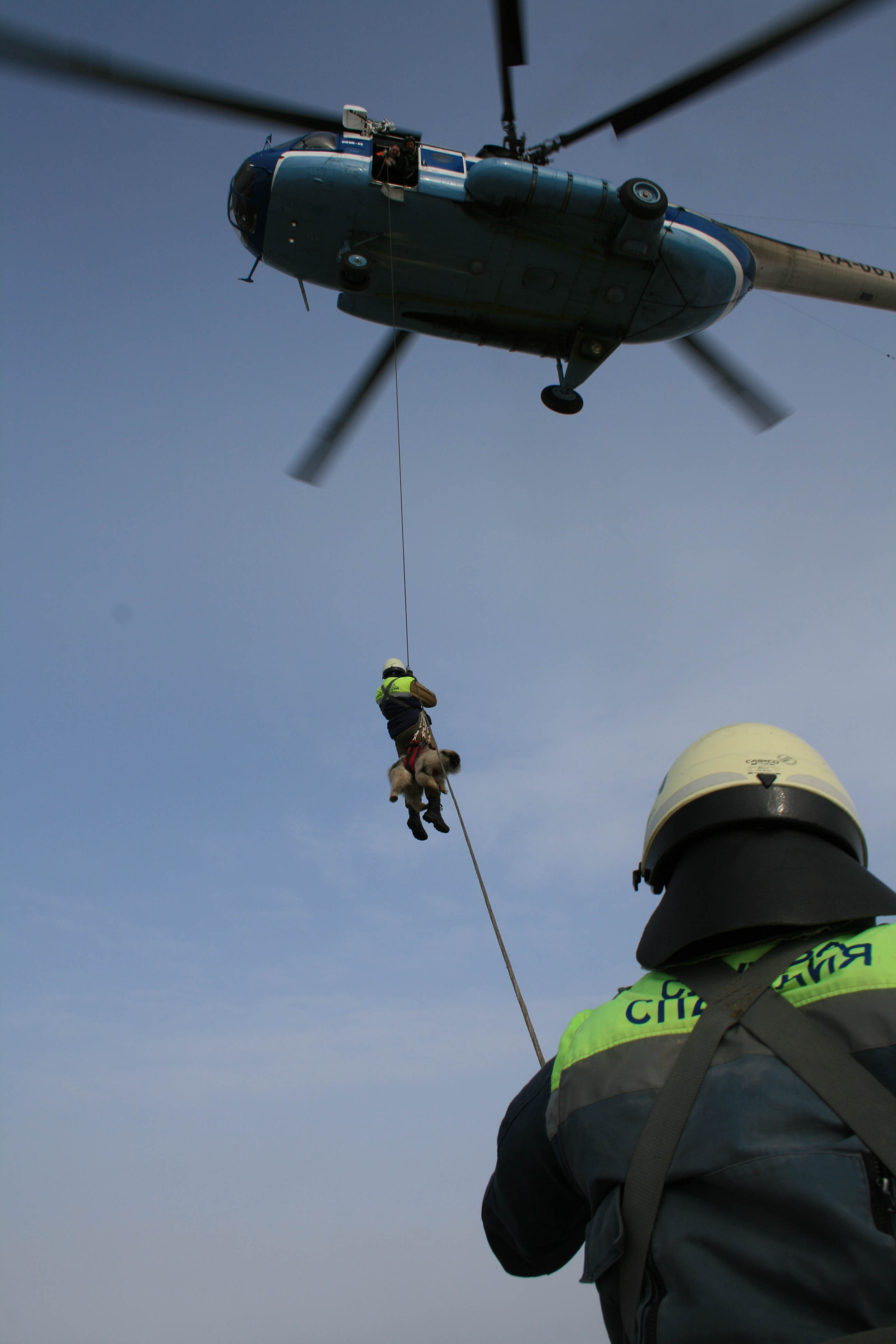
Direct deployment

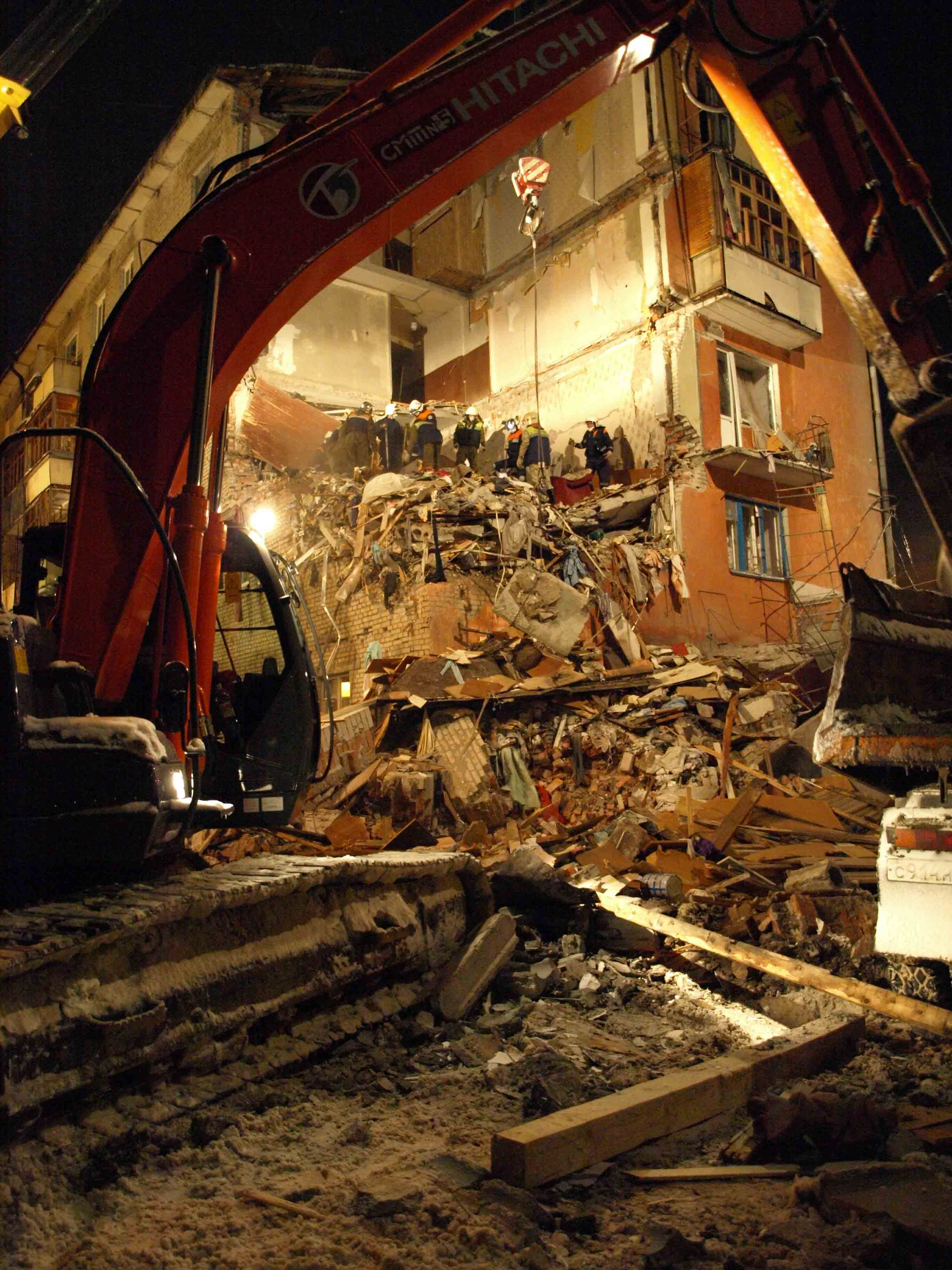
Gas explosion in a multiple dwelling

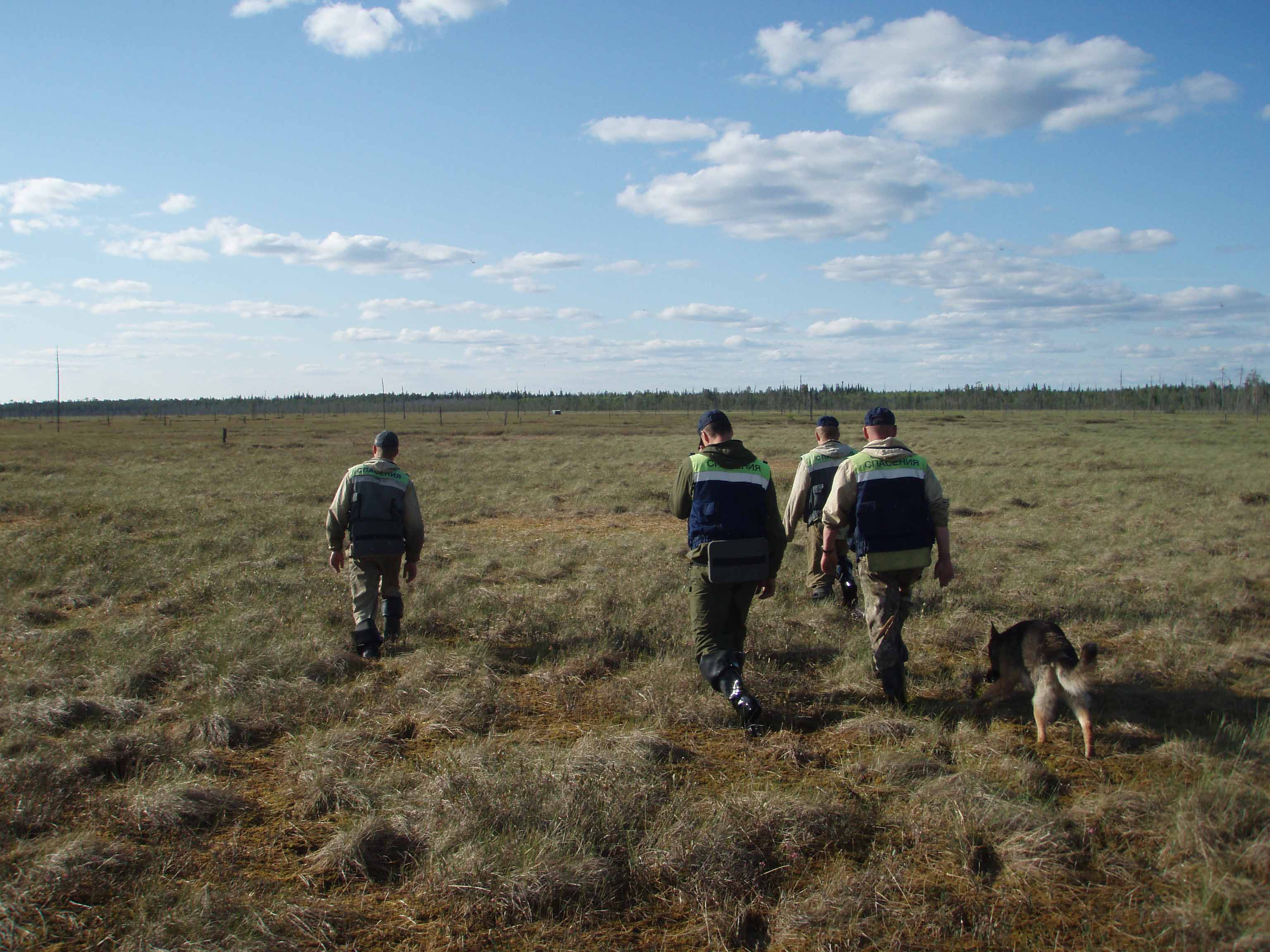
Searching for missing persons

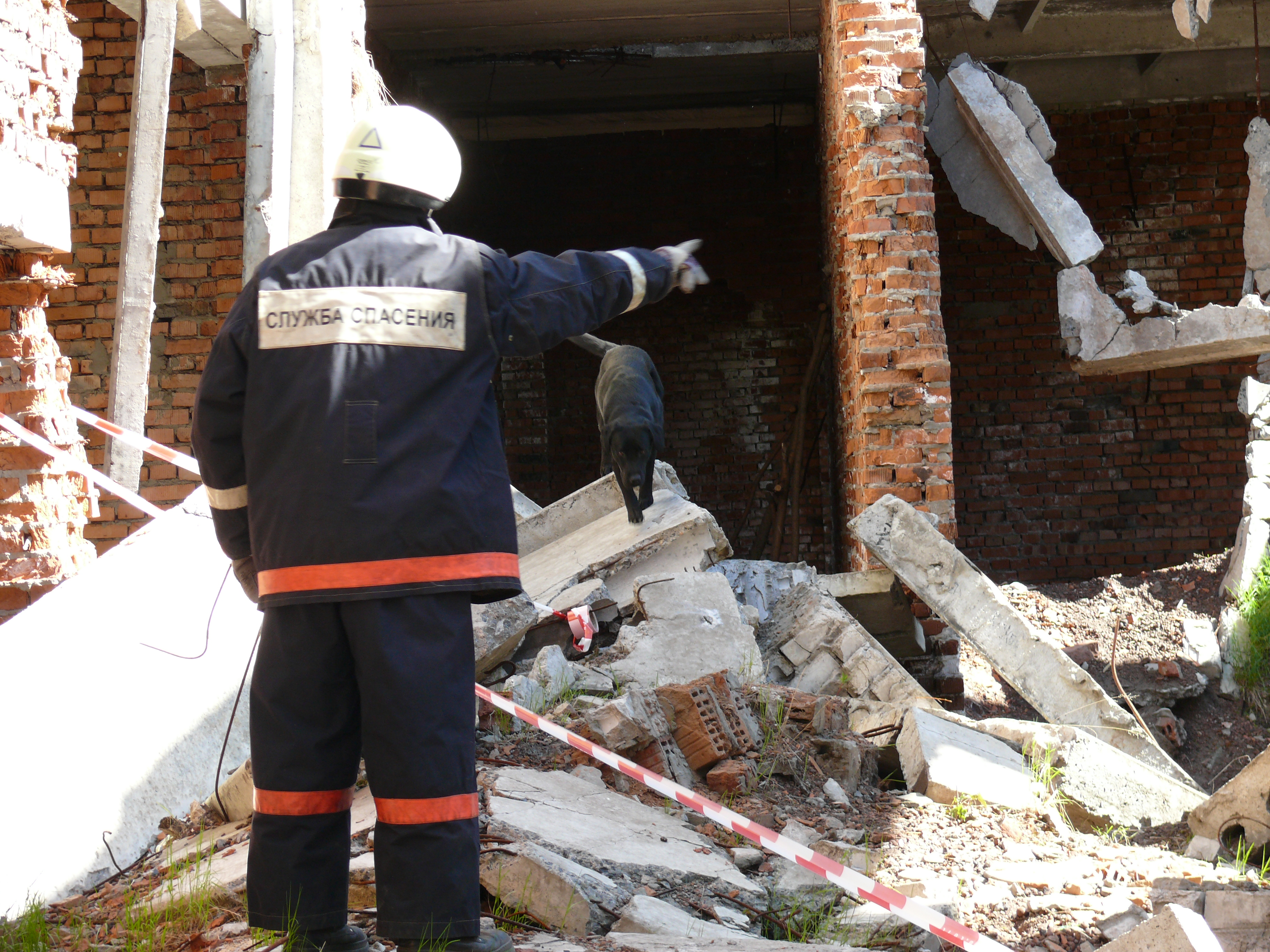
Rescue operation in construction collapse

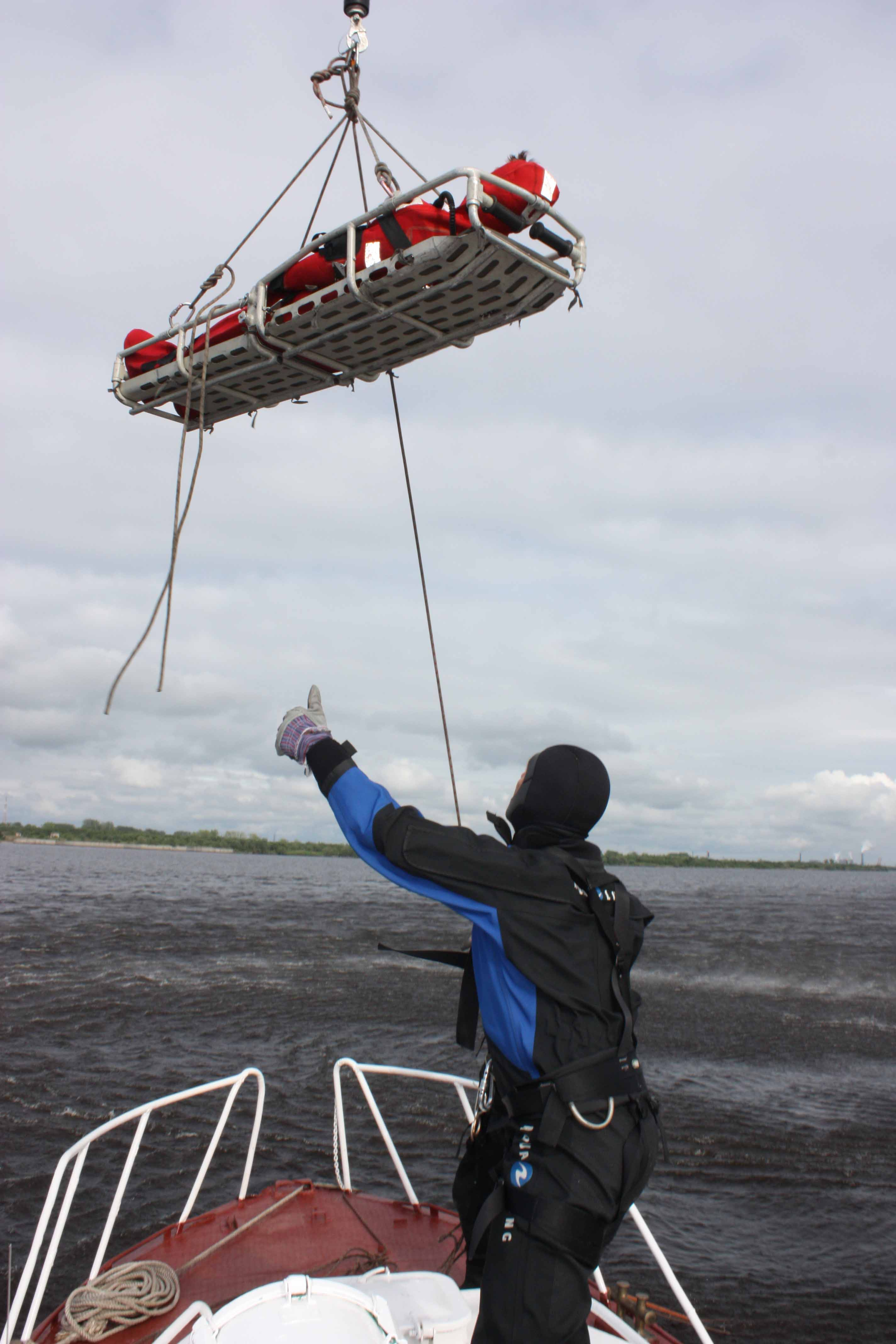
Training of rescue swimmers

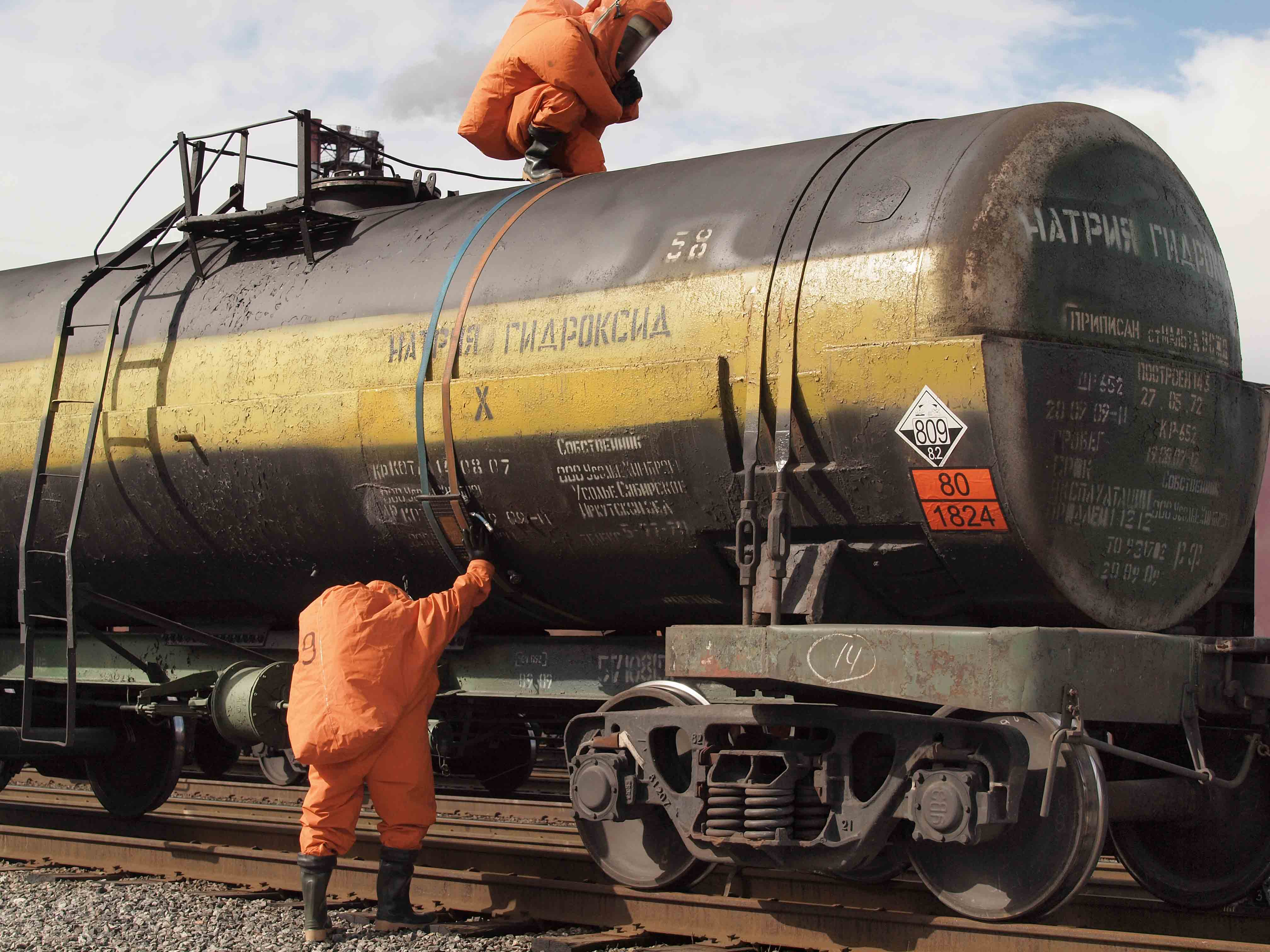
Identifying hazardous materials

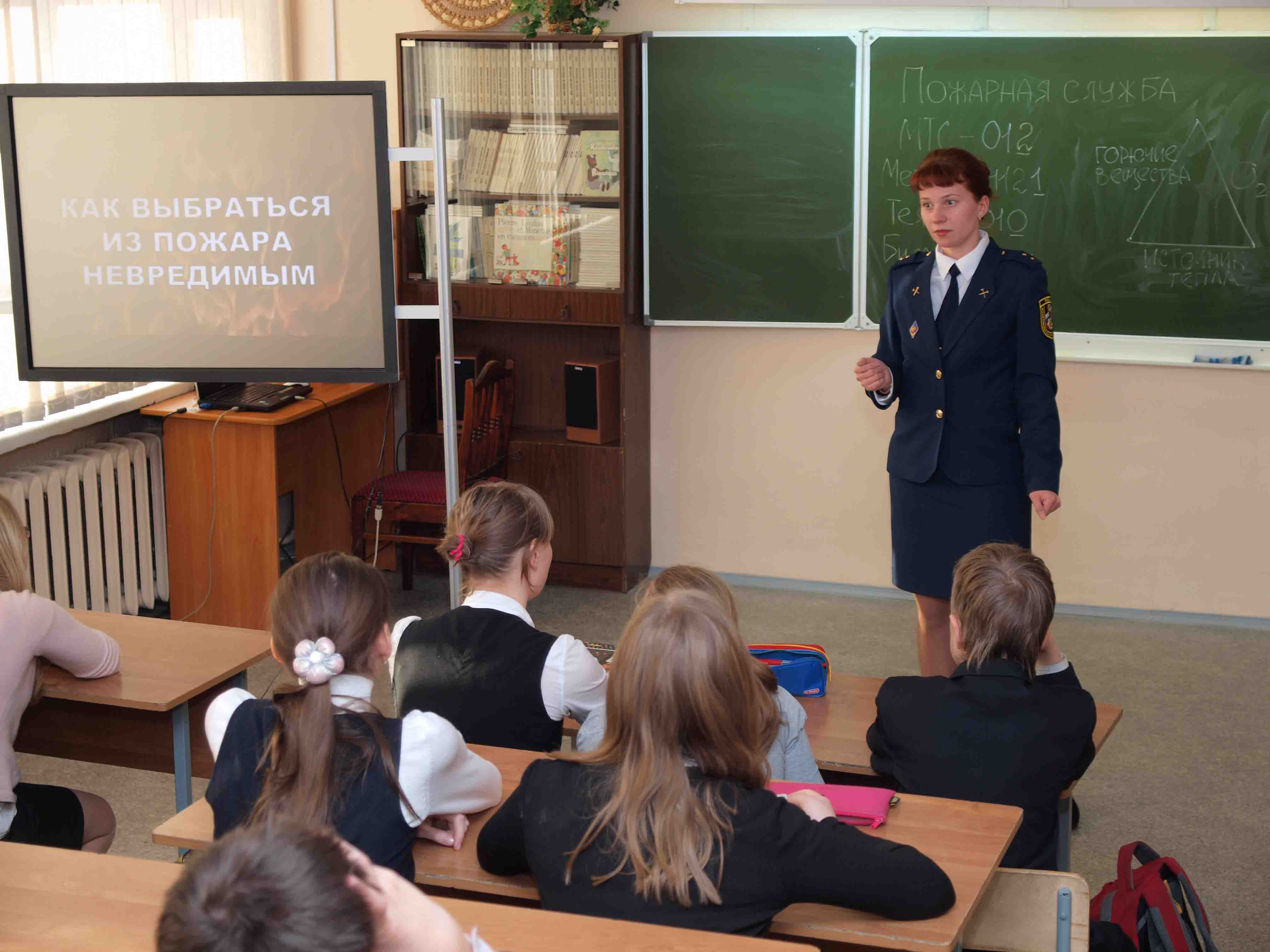
Safety talk in school

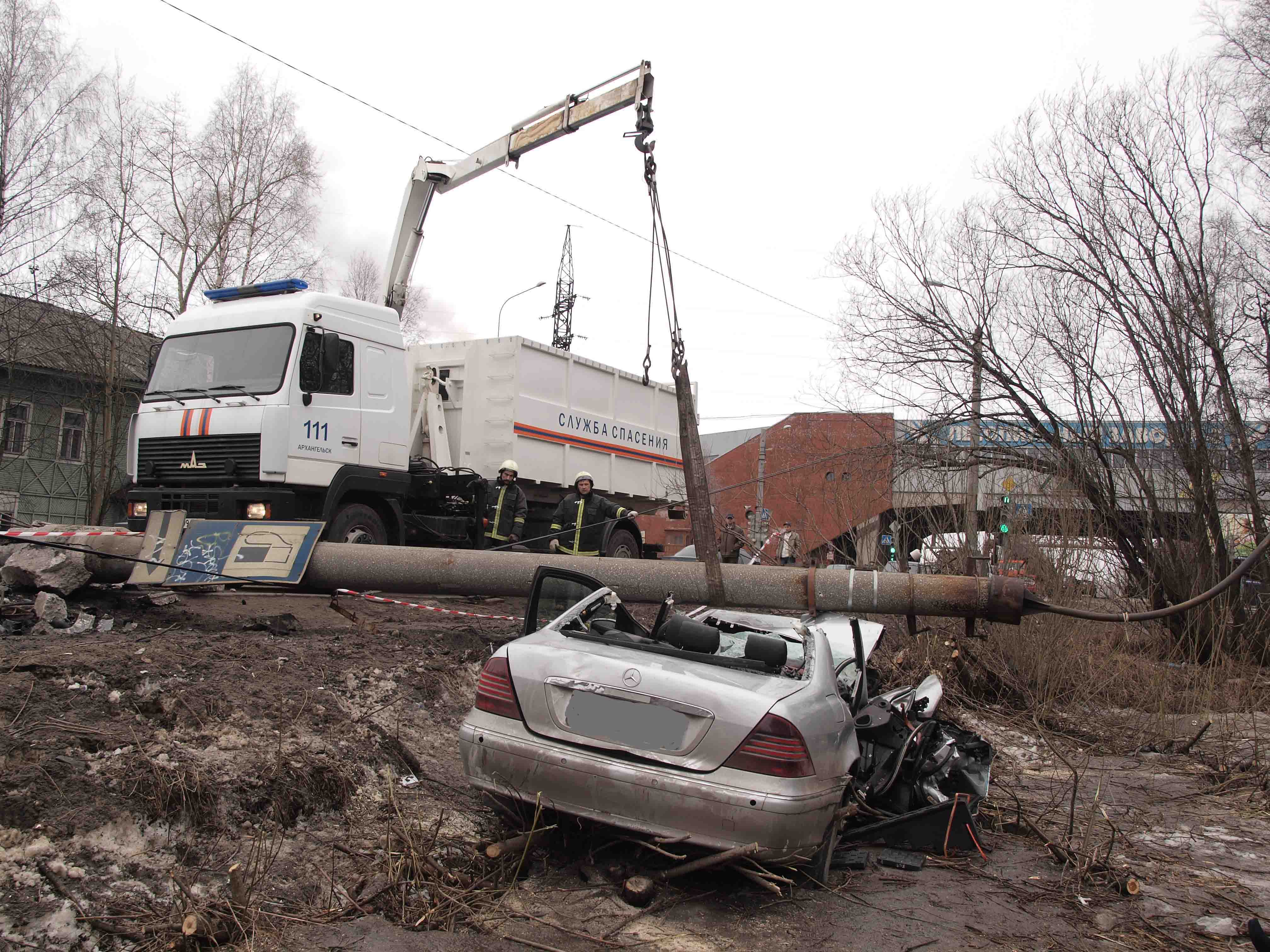
Rescue in road accident

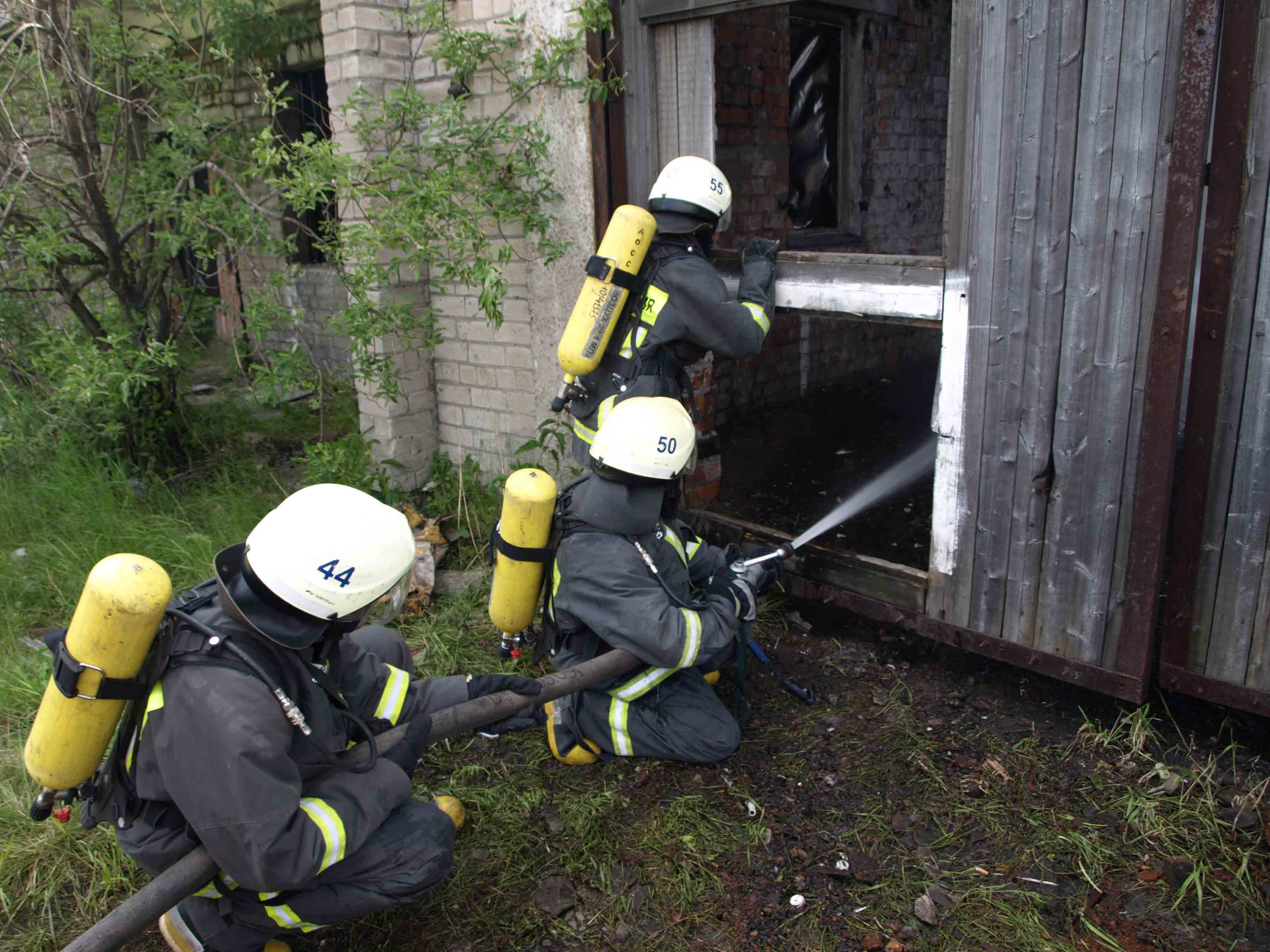
Firefighting

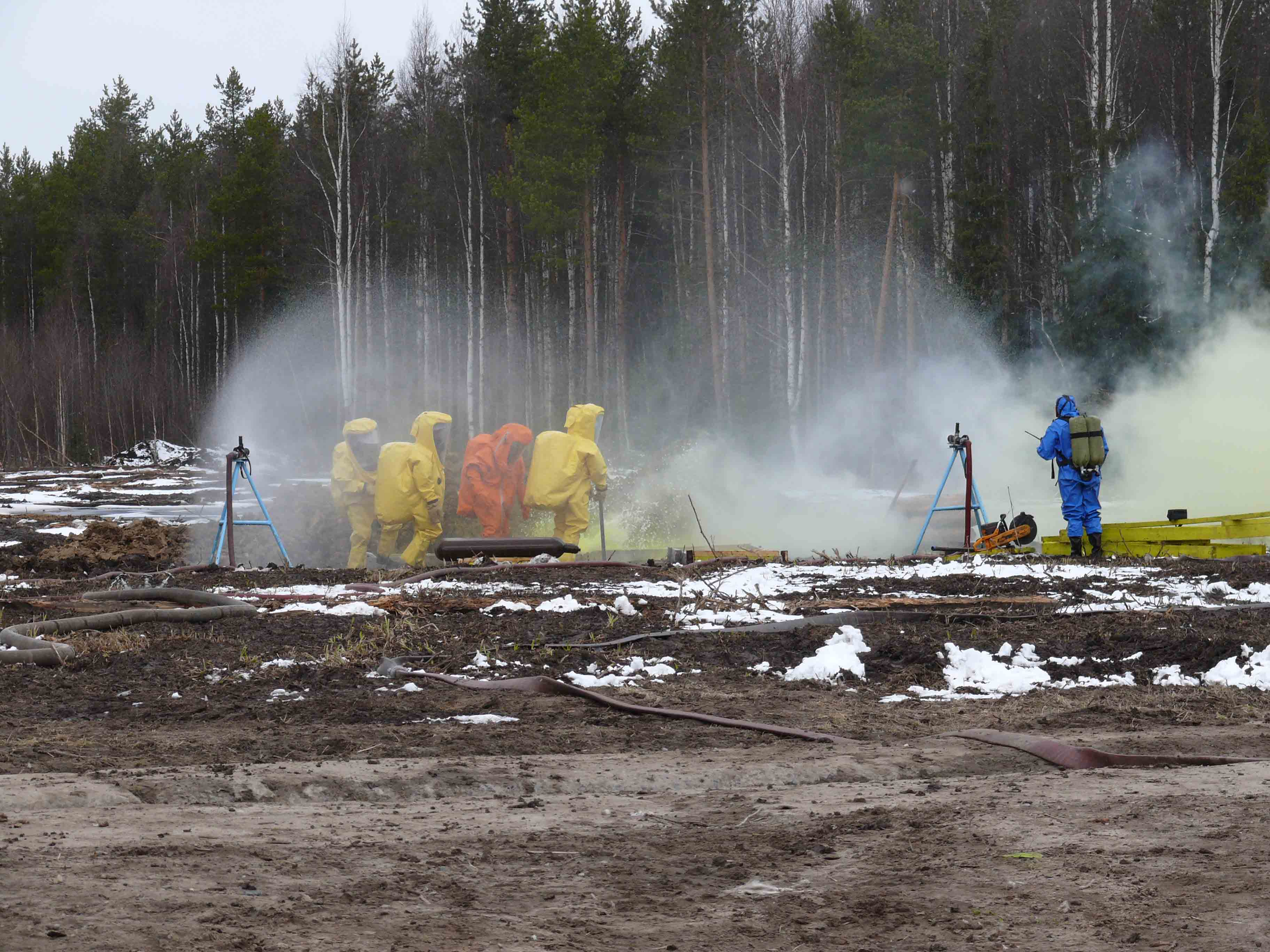
Mitigating hazardous materials

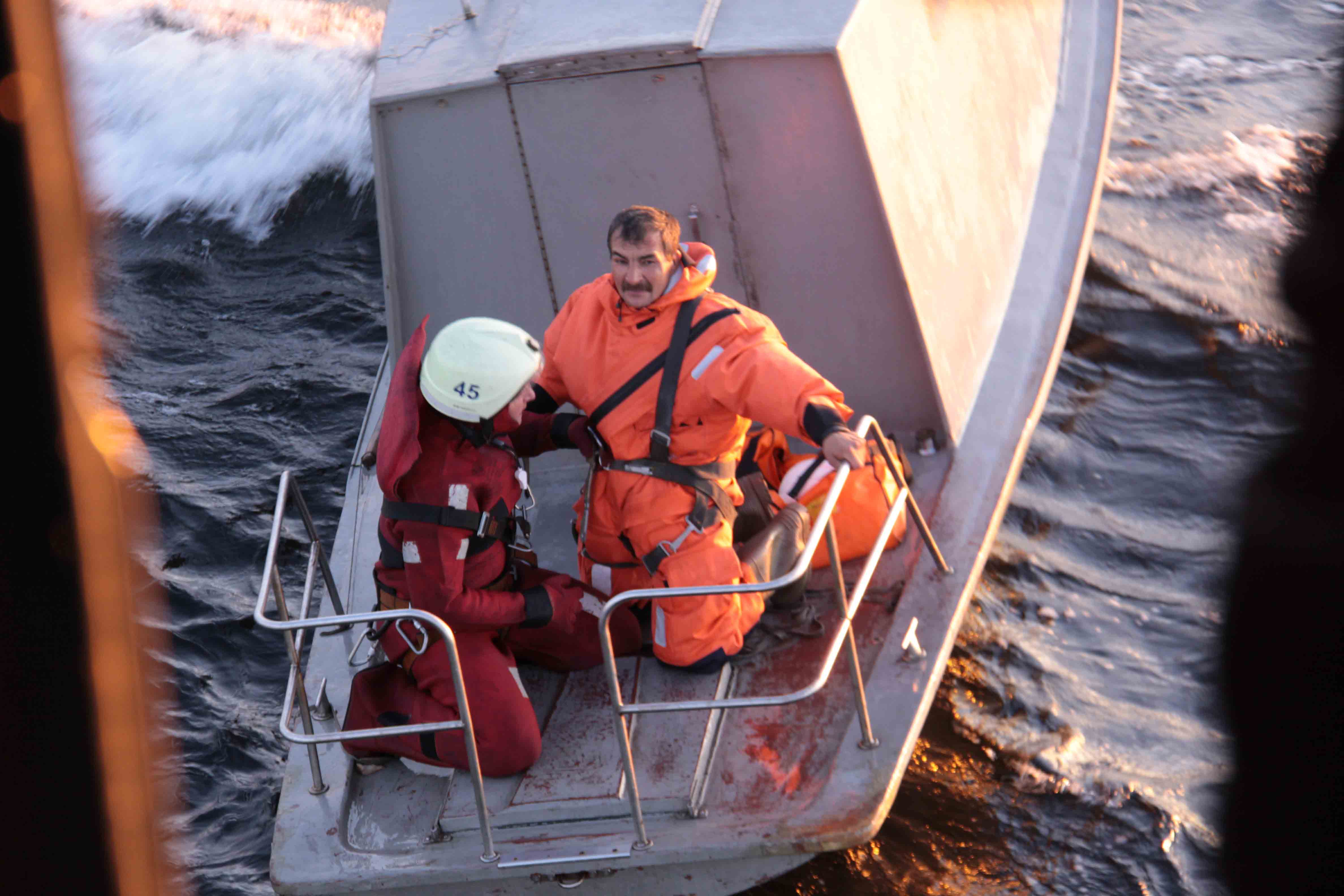
Sea rescue

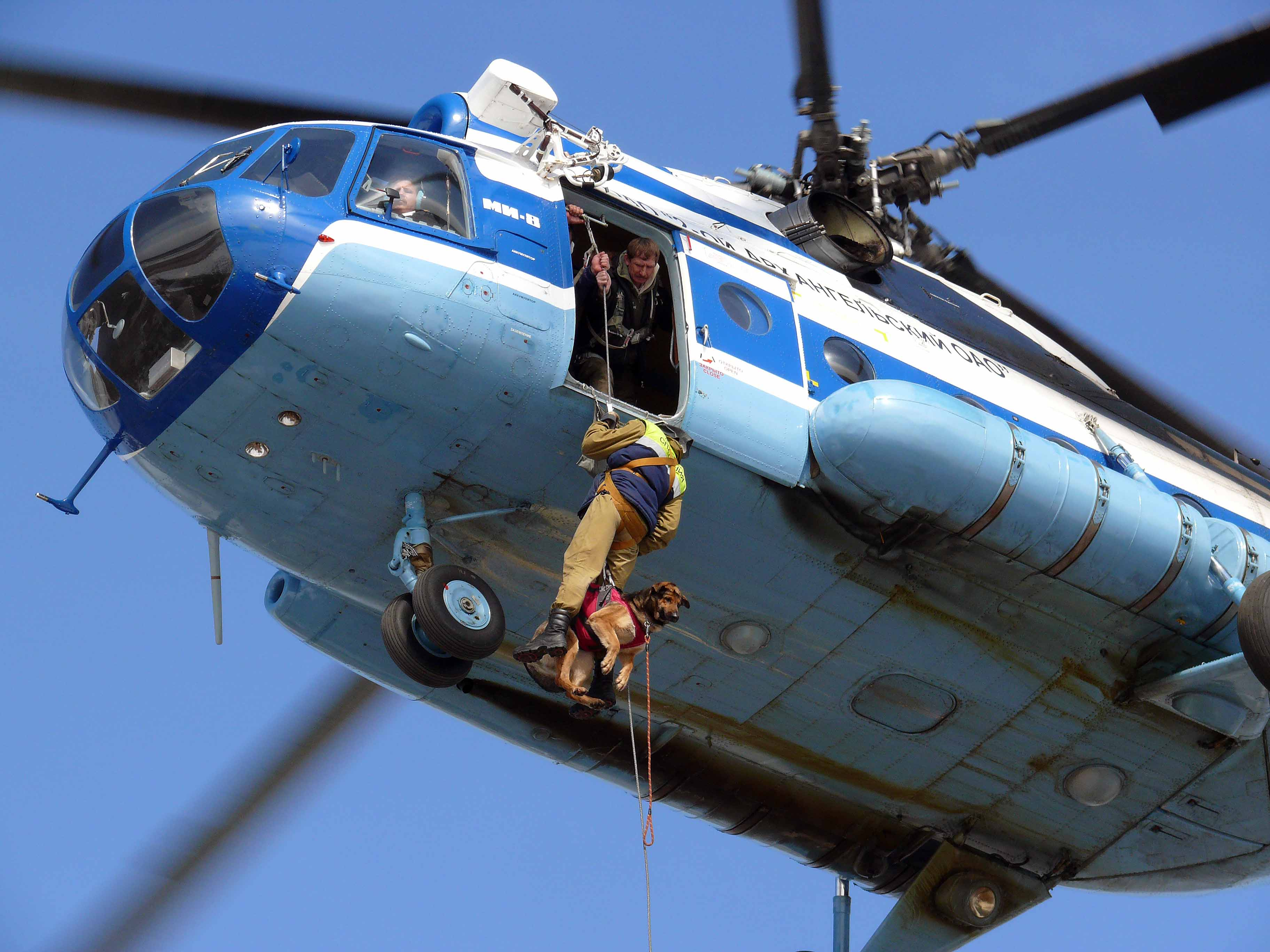
Air deployment of rescuer and dog

== See also ==
- Emergency service
- Chlorine
