= Saunino =

Saunino Саунино
- Village
- Location within Vologda Oblast Location within Russia
- Coordinates: 59°24′N 38°37′E
- Country: Russia
- Region: Vologda Oblast
- District: Sheksninsky District
- Time zone: UTC+3:00

Saunino (Russian: Саунино) is a rural locality (a village) in Sizemskoye Rural Settlement, Sheksninsky District, Vologda Oblast, Russia. The population was 7 as of 2002.

== Geography ==
Saunino is located 60 km north of Sheksna (the district's administrative centre) by road. Koluberevo is the nearest rural locality.
