= Koryakino =

Rural localities in Russia

Koryakino (Russian: Корякино) is the name of several rural localities in Russia:

- Koryakino, Arkhangelsk Oblast, a village in Kenoretsky Selsoviet of Plesetsky District of Arkhangelsk Oblast
- Koryakino, Moscow Oblast, a village in Grebnevskoye Rural Settlement of Shchyolkovsky District of Moscow Oblast
- Koryakino, Busayevsky Rural Okrug, Klepikovsky District, Ryazan Oblast, a village in Busayevsky Rural Okrug of Klepikovsky District of Ryazan Oblast
- Koryakino, Myagkovsky Rural Okrug, Klepikovsky District, Ryazan Oblast, a village in Myagkovsky Rural Okrug of Klepikovsky District of Ryazan Oblast
- Koryakino, Ushmorsky Rural Okrug, Klepikovsky District, Ryazan Oblast, a village in Ushmorsky Rural Okrug of Klepikovsky District of Ryazan Oblast
- Koryakino, Udomelsky District, Tver Oblast, a village in Udomelsky District, Tver Oblast
- Koryakino, Zapadnodvinsky District, Tver Oblast, a village in Zapadnodvinsky District, Tver Oblast
- Koryakino, Kirillovsky District, Vologda Oblast, a village in Nikolo-Torzhsky Selsoviet of Kirillovsky District of Vologda Oblast
- Koryakino, Sheksninsky District, Vologda Oblast, a village in Sizemsky Selsoviet of Sheksninsky District of Vologda Oblast
- Koryakino, Sokolsky District, Vologda Oblast, a village in Arkhangelsky Selsoviet of Sokolsky District of Vologda Oblast
- Koryakino, Vologodsky District, Vologda Oblast, a village in Goncharovsky Selsoviet of Vologodsky District of Vologda Oblast
- Koryakino, Yaroslavl Oblast, a village in Yermakovsky Rural Okrug of Danilovsky District of Yaroslavl Oblast
