= Podvolochye =

Podvolochye (Russian: Подволочье) is the name of several rural localities in Russia:

- Podvolochye, Arkhangelsk Oblast, a village in Tarasovsky Selsoviet of Plesetsky District of Arkhangelsk Oblast
- Podvolochye, Kirov Oblast, a village in Istobensky Rural Okrug of Orichevsky District of Kirov Oblast
- Podvolochye, Kostroma Oblast, a village in Belkovskoye Settlement of Vokhomsky District of Kostroma Oblast
- Podvolochye, Pyzhugsky Selsoviet, Kichmengsko-Gorodetsky District, Vologda Oblast, a village in Pyzhugsky Selsoviet of Kichmengsko-Gorodetsky District of Vologda Oblast
- Podvolochye, Shestakovsky Selsoviet, Kichmengsko-Gorodetsky District, Vologda Oblast, a village in Shestakovsky Selsoviet of Kichmengsko-Gorodetsky District of Vologda Oblast
- Podvolochye, Verkhneyentalsky Selsoviet, Kichmengsko-Gorodetsky District, Vologda Oblast, a village in Verkhneyentalsky Selsoviet of Kichmengsko-Gorodetsky District of Vologda Oblast
- Podvolochye, Pokrovsky Selsoviet, Velikoustyugsky District, Vologda Oblast, a village in Pokrovsky Selsoviet of Velikoustyugsky District of Vologda Oblast
- Podvolochye, Verkhneshardengsky Selsoviet, Velikoustyugsky District, Vologda Oblast, a village in Verkhneshardengsky Selsoviet of Velikoustyugsky District of Vologda Oblast
