= Samoded =

Rural locality in Arkhangelsk Oblast, Russia

Samoded Самодед
- Settlement
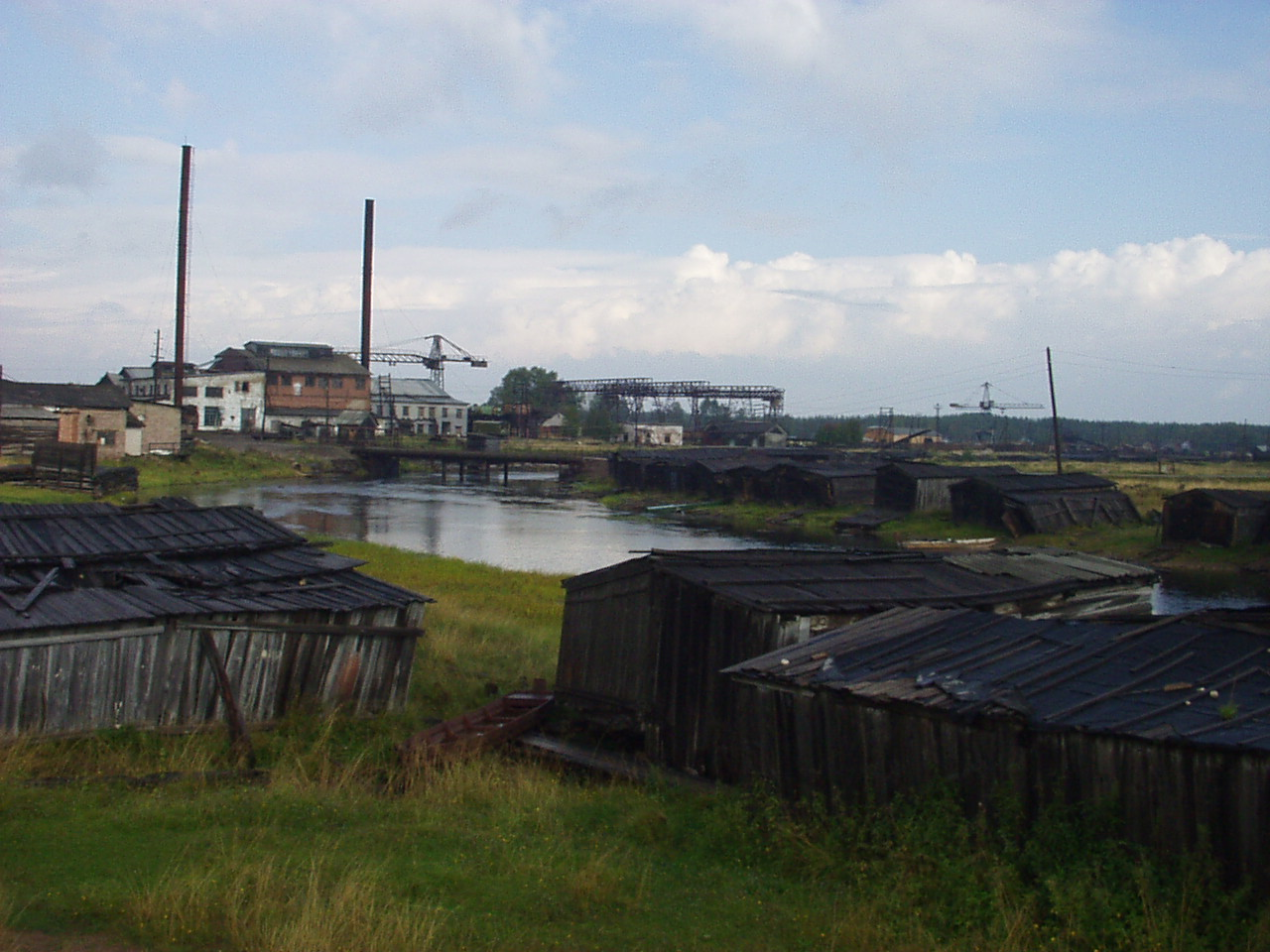
- Panorama of the industrial area
- Interactive map of Samoded
- Location of Samoded Samoded (Arkhangelsk Oblast)
- Coordinates: 63°37′05″N 40°30′46″E
- Country: Russia
- Federal subject: Arkhangelsk Oblast
- Administrative district: Plesetsky District
- SelsovietSelsoviet: Kholmogorsky Selsoviet
- Founded: 1926

Population (2010 Census)
  - Total: 1,518
  - Estimate (2017): 1,248 (−17.8%)

Municipal status
  - Municipal district: Plesetsky Municipal District
  - Rural settlement: Samodedskoye Rural Settlement
  - Capital of: Samodedskoye Rural Settlement
- Time zone: UTC+3 (MSK)
- Postal code: 164269
- Dialing code: +7 81832
- OKTMO ID: 11650426101

Samoded (Russian: Самодед) is a rural locality (a settlement) located in the north of Plesetsky District of Arkhangelsk Oblast, Russia, on both banks of the Vaymuga River, a tributary of the Yemtsa River. Within the framework of municipal divisions, it serves as the administrative center of Samodedskoye Rural Settlement, one of the thirteen rural settlements in the district. Population: 1,518 (2010 census); 2,004 (2002 census); 3,072 (1989 Soviet census).

== History ==
It was established in July 1926 and named after Russian Civil War hero Grigory Samoded who was one of the organizers of the defense of the Plesetsk area from advancing American troops. The settlement was needed to serve a new sawmill. From March 2, 1928. Samoded was the administrative center of Samoded Settlement Soviet of Arkhangelsky Uyezd, Arkhangelsk Governorate. On July 15, 1929, the uyezds were abolished, and Samoded became a part of Plesetsky District of Northern Krai (from 1937, Arkhangelsk Oblast).

During World War II, it played an active part in supplying the Red Army with clothing and food and helped the families of soldiers, engaged in placing evacuees.

Samoded had work settlement status until it was demoted to a rural locality in February 2013.

== Economy ==
The economy of the settlement is based mostly on the timber industry.

Samoded is located 1 kilometer (0.62 mi) from the Permilovo railway station, on the railroad between Moscow and Arkhangelsk.

Samoded is located on the road connecting Kargopol with one of the principal highways in Russia, M8 between Moscow and Arkhangelsk (the highways meet in the village of Brin-Navolok). This is the historic trading route which connected Kargopol with Arkhangelsk before the railroad was built, and long stretches of this road are still unpaved.
