= Zashondomye =

Zashondomye Зашондомье
- Village
- Location within Arkhangelsk Oblast Location within Russia
- Coordinates: 62°22′N 39°50′E
- Country: Russia
- Region: Arkhangelsk Oblast
- District: Plesetsky District
- Time zone: UTC+3:00

Zashondomye (Russian: Зашондомье) is a rural locality (a village) in Plesetsky District, Arkhangelsk Oblast, Russia. The population was 1 as of 2012. There are 3 streets.

== Geography ==
Zashondomye is located on the Mosha River, 51 km southwest of Plesetsk (the district's administrative centre) by road. Zinovo is the nearest rural locality.
