= Kena (river) =

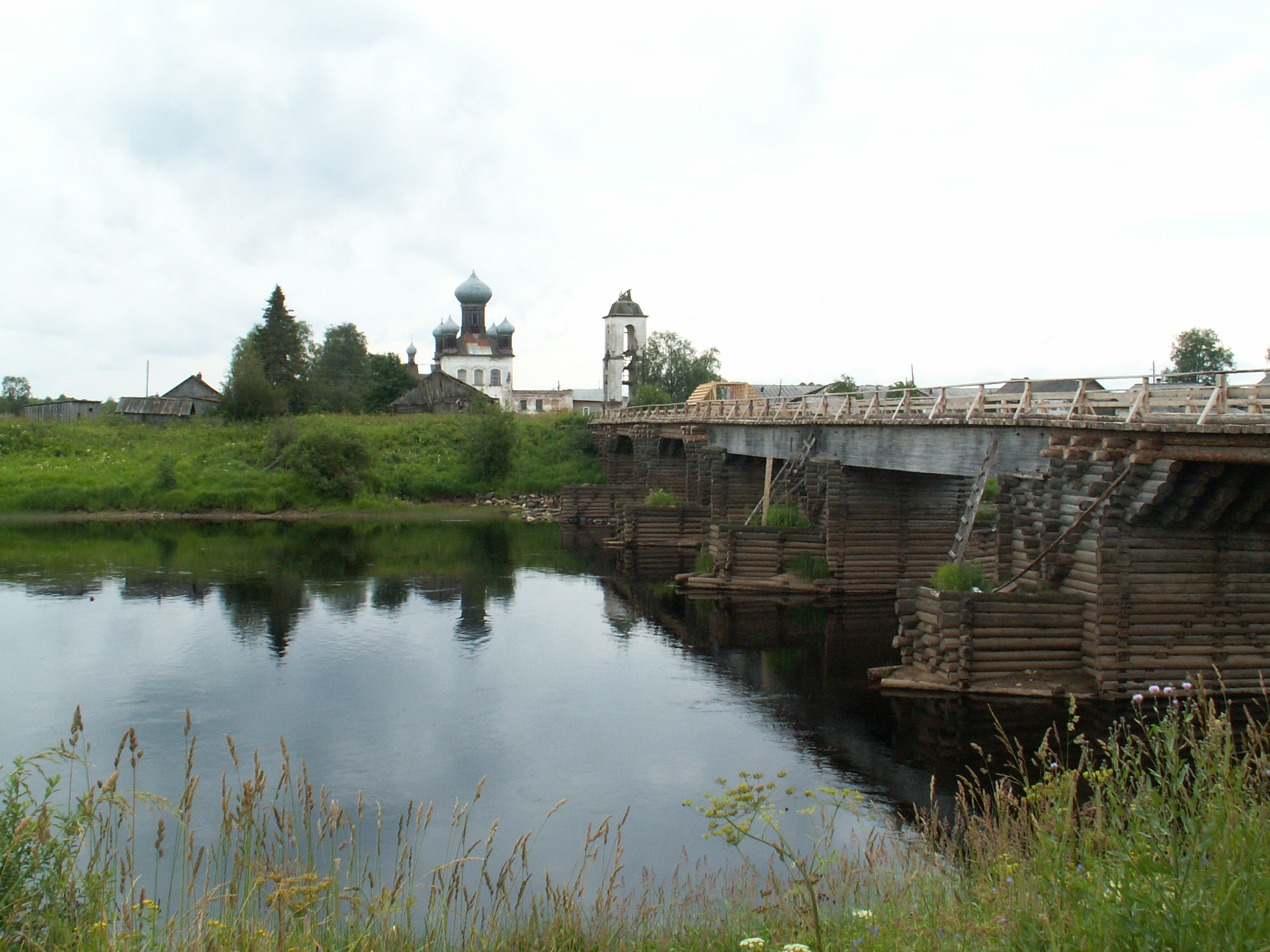
- Native name: Кена (Russian)

Location
- Country: Russia

Physical characteristics
- Source
  - location: Lake Kenozero
- Mouth: Onega
  - coordinates: 62°06′20″N 39°03′47″E
- Length: 39 km (24 mi)
- Basin size: 8,120 km^{2} (3,140 sq mi)

Basin features
- Progression: Onega→ White Sea

The Onega River basin. The map shows the Kena

The Kena (Russian: Кена) is a river in Plesetsky District of Arkhangelsk Oblast in Russia. It is a left tributary of the Onega. It is 39 kilometres (24 mi) long, and the area of its basin 8,120 square kilometres (3,140 sq mi). The source of the Kena is at Lake Kenozero.

The river basin of the Kena covers a vast area in the western part of Plesetsky District and some minor areas of Onezhsky District. The main tributary of the Lake Kenozero is the Pocha, which, in turn, flows out of Lake Pochozero. The main tributary of the Lake Pochozero is the Undosha. The source of the Undosha is the Lake Undozero, one of the biggest lakes of the region, and a major right tributary is the Toksha.

The source of the Kena is in the eastern part of the Lake Kenozero, in the village of Pershlakhta. Several kilometers in the upper course of the Kena are located in Kenozersky National Park. The river flows in the eastern direction. Its mouth is located between the villages of Volovo and Voznesenskaya. The whole valley of the Kena is populated, with about a dozen villages located at both banks of the river. On the left bank, there is a road with regular bus service, connecting Kenozyorsky National Park with the valley of the Onega and eventually with Plesetsk and Kargopol.
