= Podgornya =

Podgornya Подгорня
- Village
- Location within Arkhangelsk Oblast Location within Russia
- Coordinates: 62°45′N 41°20′E
- Country: Russia
- Region: Arkhangelsk Oblast
- District: Plesetsky District
- Time zone: UTC+3:00

Podgornya (Russian: Подгорня) is a rural locality (a village) in Plesetsky District, Arkhangelsk Oblast, Russia. The population was 4 as of 2012.

== Geography ==
Podgornya is located 100 km east of Plesetsk (the district's administrative centre) by road. Barkhatikha is the nearest rural locality.

== History ==
The village was first mentioned in 1556 in the records of the Kargopol Uyezd. Until the 1980s, a village named Podol existed near it, which was called Vesinskaya before the revolution. According to local historians and residents, the old name of the village is linked to the once-inhabited Ves people of the Finno-Ugric tribes. In 1562, the "Letters of Nikita Grigoryevich Yakhontov and Companions from the Kargopol Books" mentioned the "Nicholas Pogost and the Church of Nicholas the Miracle-Worker." In 1651, due to its dilapidation, the Nicholas Church was dismantled, and a Trinity Church was built in its place, which was destroyed by lightning on June 3, 1789.
