= Shishkina, Plesetsky District, Arkhangelsk Oblast =

Shishkina Шишкина
- Village
- Location within Arkhangelsk Oblast Location within Russia
- Coordinates: 62°04′N 38°12′E
- Country: Russia
- Region: Arkhangelsk Oblast
- District: Plesetsky District
- Time zone: UTC+3:00

Shishkina (Russian: Шишкина) is a rural locality (a village) in Kenozerskoye Rural Settlement of Plesetsky District, Arkhangelsk Oblast, Russia. The population was 46 as of 2010.

== Geography ==
Shishkina is located 167 km southwest of Plesetsk (the district's administrative centre) by road. Gory is the nearest rural locality.
