= Zakumikhinskaya =

Zakumikhinskaya Закумихинская
- Village
- Location within Arkhangelsk Oblast Location within Russia
- Coordinates: 62°25′N 39°50′E
- Country: Russia
- Region: Arkhangelsk Oblast
- District: Plesetsky District
- Time zone: UTC+3:00

Zakumikhinskaya (Russian: Закумихинская) is a rural locality (a village) in Plesetsky District, Arkhangelsk Oblast, Russia. The population was 3 as of 2010. There are 3 streets.

== Geography ==
Zakumikhinskaya is located 51 km southwest of Plesetsk (the district's administrative centre) by road. Tarasovo is the nearest rural locality.
