= Skripovo =

Skripovo Скрипово
- Village
- Location within Arkhangelsk Oblast Location within Russia
- Coordinates: 62°45′N 41°19′E
- Country: Russia
- Region: Arkhangelsk Oblast
- District: Plesetsky District
- Time zone: UTC+3:00

Skripovo (Russian: Скрипово) is a rural locality (a village) in Tarasovskoye Rural Settlement of Plesetsky District, Arkhangelsk Oblast, Russia. The population was 2 as of 2010.

== Geography ==
Skripovo is located on the Shorda River, 100 km east of Plesetsk (the district's administrative centre) by road. Maslennikova is the nearest rural locality.
