= Lake Kenozero =

Lake in Arkhangelsk Oblast, Russia

Lake Kenozero Кенозеро
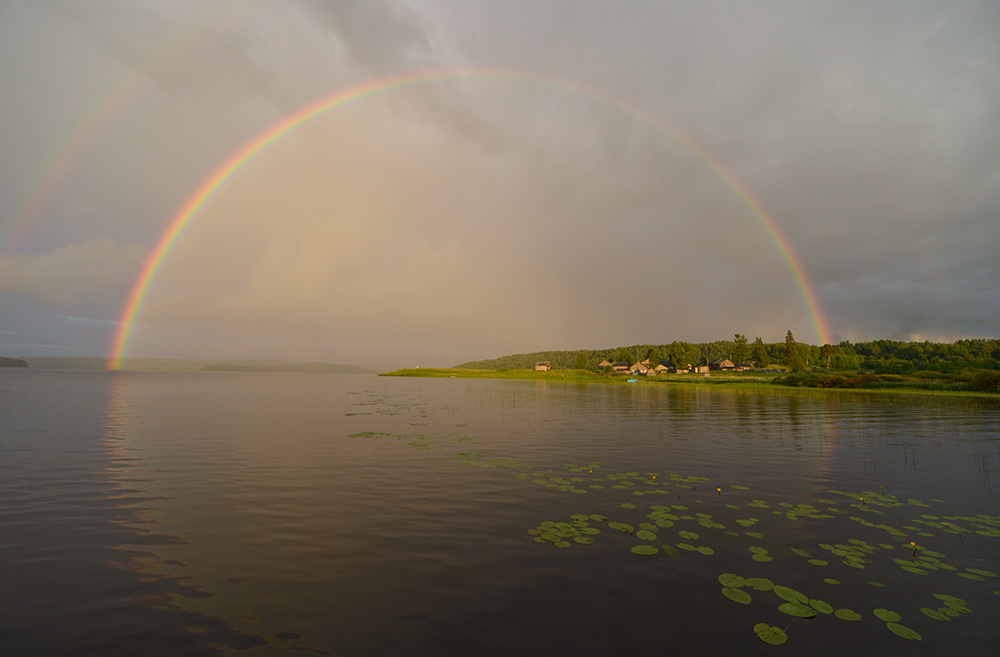

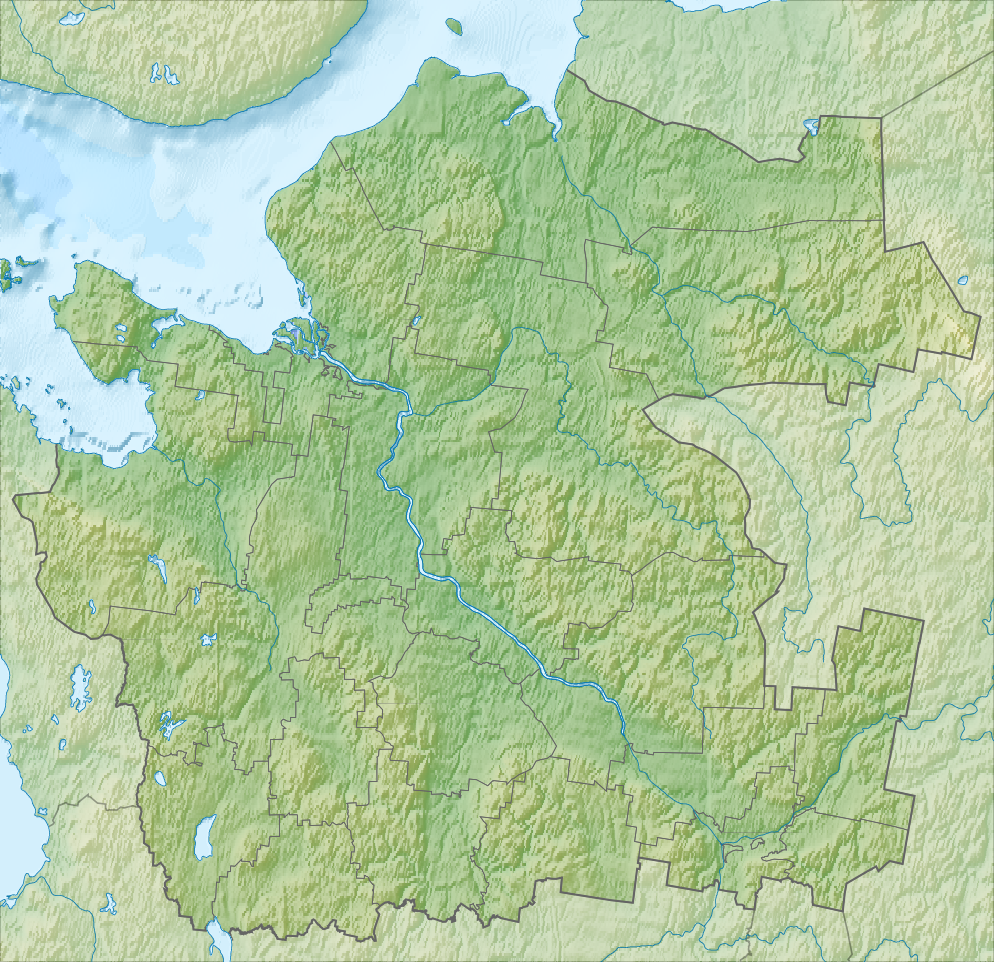
- Location within Arkhangelsk Oblast
- Location: Arkhangelsk Oblast
- Coordinates: 62°06′N 38°29′E
- Primary inflows: Pocha
- Primary outflows: Kena
- Catchment area: 5,450 square kilometres (2,100 mi^{2})
- Basin countries: Russia
- Surface area: 68.6 square kilometres (26.5 mi^{2})
- Surface elevation: 85 m (279 ft)

The Onega River basin. The map also shows Lake Kenozero.

Lake Kenozero (Russian: Кенозеро) is a freshwater lake, located in the south-west of Plesetsky District of Arkhangelsk Oblast in Russia. It is one of the biggest lakes in Arkhangelsk Oblast and the biggest one in Plesetsky District. The area of the lake is 68.6 square kilometres (26.5 mi^{2}), and the area of its basin is 5,450 square kilometres (2,100 mi^{2}). Lake Kenozero is the source of the Kena, a tributary of the Onega. The lake thus belongs to the Onega basin and the White Sea basin.

The lake is located close to the border of Arkhangelsk Oblast and Republic of Karelia. It belongs to Kenozersky National Park.

The basin of Lake Kenozero covers a vast area in the western part of Plesetsky District and some minor areas of Onezhsky District. The main tributary of the lake is the Pocha, which, in turn, flows out of Lake Pochozero. The main tributary of Lake Pochozero is the Undosha. The source of the Undosha is Lake Undozero, one of the biggest lakes of the region, and a major right tributary is the Toksha.

The lake has a complex shape and in fact consists of three lakes connected by straights: Lake Kenozero proper, Lake Svinoye, and Lake Dolgoye. The shape is determined by the fact that Lake Kenozero is located in the rift of the earthcrust, in contrast to other lakes in Kenozersky National Park, all of them being of glacial origin. There are over 70 islands on Lake Kenozero.

Until the 1990s, the lake served for timber rafting. The rafts were made in the course of the Undosha and the destination was the Onega.

There are a dozen of villages at the lakeshore, the biggest of which are Vershinino and Pershlakhta. The road connects the northern shore (in particular, Ust-Pocha, Vershinino, and Pershlakhta) with Onezhsky Trakt, the road connecting Kargopol via Plesetsk to Yemetsk. The road continues north to Pochozero and upstream Toksha River to the village of Nizhneye Ustye. There is regular bus service on this road, connecting Nizhneye Ustye with the selo of Konyovo and eventually with the district center of Plesetsk. The roads at the western and southern shores are not all-seasonal and are connected to the road network in the village of Morshchikhinskaya on Lake Lyokshmozero.

The 2014 film "The Postman's White Nights" is set in Lake Kenozero.
