= Sheleksa =

Sheleksa Шелекса
- Settlement
- Location within Arkhangelsk Oblast Location within Russia
- Coordinates: 62°53′N 40°18′E
- Country: Russia
- Region: Arkhangelsk Oblast
- District: Plesetsky District
- Time zone: UTC+3:00

Sheleksa (Russian: Шелекса) is a rural locality (a settlement) in Savinskoye Urban Settlement of Plesetsky District, Arkhangelsk Oblast, Russia. The population was 90 as of 2010. There are 12 streets.

== Geography ==
Sheleksa is located 23 km north of Plesetsk (the district's administrative centre) by road. Savinsky is the nearest rural locality.
