= Shestovo =

Shestovo Шестово
- Village
- Location within Arkhangelsk Oblast Location within Russia
- Coordinates: 62°55′34″N 40°04′18″E
- Country: Russia
- Region: Arkhangelsk Oblast
- District: Plesetsky District
- Time zone: UTC+3:00

Shestovo (Russian: Шестово) is a rural locality (a village) in Plesetsky District, Arkhangelsk Oblast, Russia. The population was 31 as of 2010.

== Geography ==
Shestovo is located 37 km north of Plesetsk (the district's administrative centre) by road. Savinsky is the nearest rural locality.
