= Puksoozero =

Rural locality in Arkhangelsk Oblast, Russia

Puksoozero Пуксоозеро
- Settlement
- Interactive map of Puksoozero
- Location of Puksoozero Puksoozero (Arkhangelsk Oblast)
- Coordinates: 62°34′59″N 40°36′31″E
- Country: Russia
- Federal subject: Arkhangelsk Oblast
- Administrative district: Plesetsky District
- SelsovietSelsoviet: Tarasovsky Selsoviet
- Founded: 1944

Population (2010 Census)
  - Total: 1,212
  - Estimate (2013): 927 (−23.5%)

Municipal status
  - Municipal district: Plesetsky Municipal District
  - Rural settlement: Puksoozerskoye Rural Settlement
  - Capital of: Puksoozerskoye Rural Settlement
- Time zone: UTC+3 (MSK)
- Postal code: 164251
- Dialing code: +7 81832
- OKTMO ID: 11650422101
- Website: puksoozero.info

Puksoozero (Russian: Пуксоозеро) is a rural locality (a settlement) in Plesetsky District of Arkhangelsk Oblast, Russia, located 22.2 kilometers (13.8 mi) southeast of Plesetsk, on Lake Puksoozero, at the source of the Puksa River, the left tributary of the Mekhrenga. Within the framework of municipal divisions, it serves as the administrative center of Puksoozerskoye Rural Settlement, one of the thirteen rural settlements in the district. Population: 1,212 (2010 census); 2,169 (2002 census); 4,255 (1989 Soviet census).

== History ==
Puksoozero was built in 1930 as the settlement for forcibly resettled peasants. At the time, it was directly subordinate to Plesetsk Settlement Soviet. The main occupation of the population was timber production and construction of the railroad connecting Puksoozero and Puksa railway station.

In February 1938, the construction of a pulp mill No. 1 started. The construction was mainly carried out by prisoners of "Onegalag", with the headquarters located in the town of Plesetsk. In May 1939, the pulp mill No. 1 was put into operation. Pulp was used for the production of gunpowder, which was carried out in Vyborg, Leningrad Oblast. In 1944, Puksoozero was granted urban-type settlement status.

During Stalin's rule, fourteen correctional labor camps existed in and around Puksoozero. These camps contained more than fifteen thousand prisoners. Three of these were located directly adjacent to the settlement, and the remaining camps were built along the 140-kilometer (87 mi) railway. The prisoners were responsible for the timber logging.

In 1992, after the dissolution of the Soviet Union, all colonies were closed. This caused the economic crisis, and the pump mill was shut down in 1994. The population of Puksoozero dropped by the factor of 3.5 between 1989 and 2010.

Puksoozero had work settlement status until it was demoted to a rural locality in February 2013.

== Economy ==
=== Industry ===
The biggest enterprise in the settlement is Puksoozero Timber Enterprise (Russian: Пуксоозерский лесхоз).

=== Transportation ===
A road connects Puksoozero with the urban-type settlement of Plesetsk; there is regular passenger bus traffic.

Between 1930 and 2001, Puksoozero was on the Mekhrenga railroad, which at the time it was the longest, at 115 kilometers (71 mi). The railroad started at the Puksa station of the railway between Moscow and Arkhangelsk, and ran to the east, via Puksoozero to the Dalnyaya station. The locomotive depot was located in Puksoozero and closed in 2001. The railroad belonged to the State Department of Corrections and was used to transport timber. After 1966, it was gradually disassembled. The last stretch, between Puksa and Puksoozero, was closed and disassembled in 2001.
