= Lomovoy =

Lomovoy (Russian: Ломовой; masculine), Lomovaya (Ломовая; feminine), or Lomovoye (Ломовое; neuter) is the name of several rural localities (settlements, selos, and villages) in Russia:

- Lomovoye, Arkhangelsk Oblast, a settlement in Kholmogorsky Selsoviet of Plesetsky District of Arkhangelsk Oblast
- Lomovoye, Lipetsk Oblast, a selo in Lomovskoy Selsoviet of Chaplyginsky District of Lipetsk Oblast
- Lomovoye, Oryol Oblast, a selo in Lomovsky Selsoviet of Zalegoshchensky District of Oryol Oblast
- Lomovoye, Tver Oblast, a village in Likhoslavlsky District of Tver Oblast
