= Karelskoye =

Karelskoye Карельское
- Village
- Location within Arkhangelsk Oblast Location within Russia
- Coordinates: 62°13′N 39°25′E
- Country: Russia
- Region: Arkhangelsk Oblast
- District: Plesetsky District
- Time zone: UTC+3:00

Karelskoye (Russian: Карельское) is a rural locality (a village) in Plesetsky District, Arkhangelsk Oblast, Russia. The population was 3 as of 2012.

== Geography ==
Karelskoye is located on the Onega River, 78 km southwest of Plesetsk (the district's administrative centre) by road. Noviny is the nearest rural locality.
