= Obozersky =

Obozersky Обозерский
- Urban-type settlement
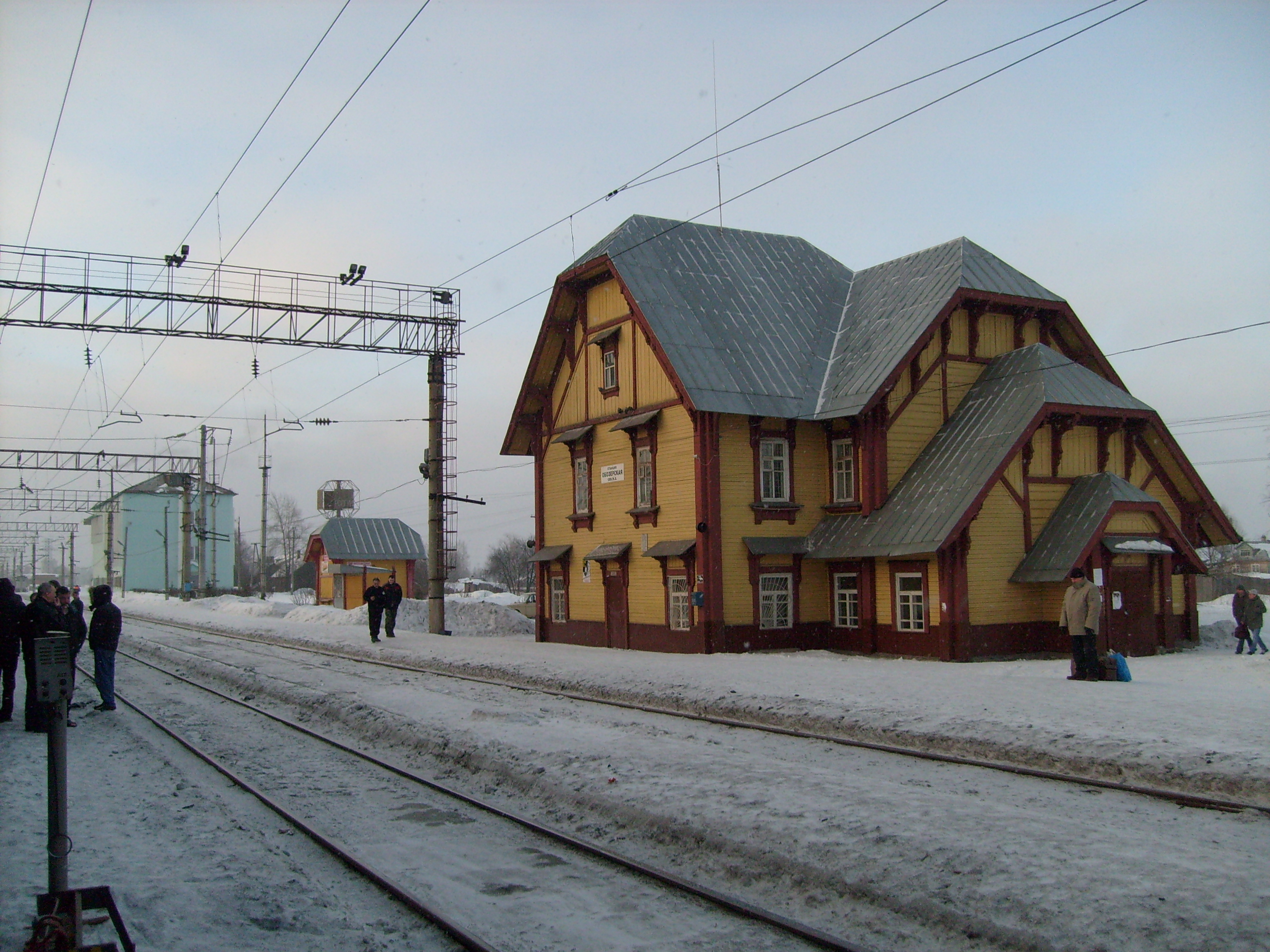
- Interactive map of Obozersky
- Location of Obozersky Obozersky (Arkhangelsk Oblast)
- Coordinates: 63°26′N 40°18′E
- Country: Russia
- Federal subject: Arkhangelsk Oblast
- Administrative district: Plesetsky District
- Founded: 1957

Population (2010 Census)
  - Total: 3,620
  - Estimate (2025): 3,261 (−9.9%)

Municipal status
  - Municipal district: Plesetsky Municipal District
  - Urban settlement: Obozerskoye Urban Settlement
  - Capital of: Obozerskoye Urban Settlement
- Time zone: UTC+3 (MSK)
- Postal codes: 164251, 164254, 164255
- Dialing code: +7 818232
- OKTMO ID: 11650163051

Obozersky (Russian: Обозе́рский) is an urban locality (an urban-type settlement) in Plesetsky District of Arkhangelsk Oblast, Russia, located on the upper Vaymuga River, a tributary of the Yemtsa River in the Northern Dvina basin. Obozersky lies 133 kilometers (83 mi) south of Arkhangelsk (by rail). The name of the settlement originates from Lake Obozero, located south of Obozersky. Military airfield Letneozyorsk is located 3 kilometers (1.9 mi) southeast of the settlement. Municipally, Obozersky is the administrative center of Obozerskoye Urban Settlement, one of the eight urban settlements in the district. Population: 3,620 (2010 census); 3,725 (2002 census); 5,837 (1989 Soviet census)..

== History ==
Obozyorsky was established as a railway station on November 29, 1987, when the railway stretch between Vologda and Arkhangelsk was built. Previously, the village of Alexandrovskaya existed at the same location. Alexandrovskaya was known from the mid-19th century. Obozyorskaya was one of the biggest cargo stations of the railway. From 1922, the station was included into Yakovlevskaya Volost of Arkhangelsky Uyezd, Arkhangelsk Governorate. In 1926, it was transferred to Plesetskaya Volost. On July 15, 1929, the uyezds were abolished, the governorates merged into Northern Krai, and Plesetsky District was established. In 1937, the settlement at Obozyorskaya railway station became the administrative center of Yakovlevsky Selsoviet.

The urban-type settlement of Obozersky was established by the Decree of the Presidium of the Russian SFSR Supreme Soviet on September 12, 1957. Yakovlevsky Selsoviet was transferred to Obozersky Settlement Soviet.

== Economy ==
The economy of Obozersky is based on lime production, logging and timber.

== Transportation ==
=== Obozerskaya rail station ===
Obozerskaya Railway station is a part of the Northern Railway. The main railroad here connects Moscow and Arkhangelsk, and another railroad to Onega, Belomorsk and Murmansk branches off to the west. This railroad was built during World War II to secure the transport of goods from the harbor of Murmansk to Moscow.

=== Highway ===
Obozersky is located on the federal road A215 (Brin Navolok - Lodeinoe Pole) connecting Kargopol, Brin Navolok and SPB with one of the principal highways in Russia, M8 between Moscow and Arkhangelsk (the highways meet in the village of Brin-Navolok). This is the historic trading route which connected Kargopol with Arkhangelsk before the railroad was built, and long stretches of this road are still unpaved.

The military air base Letneozersky is located southeast of the town.

== Culture and recreation ==
There is the Chapel of the Tikhvin Icon of the Virgin in Obozersky, built in the late 1990s.
