= Undozero =

Undozero Ундозеро
- Settlement
- Location within Arkhangelsk Oblast Location within Russia
- Coordinates: 62°41′N 38°49′E
- Country: Russia
- Region: Arkhangelsk Oblast
- District: Plesetsky District
- Time zone: UTC+3:00

Undozero (Russian: Ундозеро) is a rural locality (a settlement) and the administrative center of Undozerskoye Rural Settlement of Plesetsky District, Arkhangelsk Oblast, Russia. The population was 836 as of 2010. There are 5 streets.

== Geography ==
Undozero is located 98 km west of Plesetsk (the district's administrative centre) by road.
