= Nizhneye Ustye =

Nizhneye Ustye Нижнее Устье
- Village
- Location within Arkhangelsk Oblast Location within Russia
- Coordinates: 62°19′N 38°13′E
- Country: Russia
- Region: Arkhangelsk Oblast
- District: Plesetsky District
- Time zone: UTC+3:00

Nizhneye Ustye (Russian: Нижнее Устье) is a rural locality (a village) in Kenozerskoye Rural Settlement of Plesetsky District, Arkhangelsk Oblast, Russia. The population was 501 as of 2010. There are 8 streets.

== Geography ==
Nizhneye Ustye is located on the Toksha River, 193 km southwest of Plesetsk (the district's administrative centre) by road. Presnetsovskaya is the nearest rural locality.
