= Fedovo, Arkhangelsk Oblast =

Fedovo Федово
- Selo
- Location within Arkhangelsk Oblast Location within Russia
- Coordinates: 62°23′N 39°49′E
- Country: Russia
- Region: Arkhangelsk Oblast
- District: Plesetsky District
- Time zone: UTC+3:00

Fedovo (Russian: Федово) is a rural locality (a selo) and the administrative center of Fedovskoye Rural Settlement of Plesetsky District, Arkhangelsk Oblast, Russia. The population was 464 as of 2010. There are 10 streets.

== Geography ==
Fedovo is located on the Mosha River, 46 km southwest of Plesetsk (the district's administrative centre) by road. Sandrovo is the nearest rural locality.
