= Oksovsky =

Rural locality in Arkhangelsk Oblast, Russia

Oksovsky Оксовский
- Settlement
- Interactive map of Oksovsky
- Location of Oksovsky Oksovsky (Arkhangelsk Oblast)
- Coordinates: 62°36′21″N 39°54′40″E
- Country: Russia
- Federal subject: Arkhangelsk Oblast
- Administrative district: Plesetsky District
- SelsovietSelsoviet: Yarnemsky Selsoviet
- Founded: 1961
- Elevation: 67 m (220 ft)

Population (2010 Census)
  - Total: 2,051
  - Estimate (2013): 1,943 (−5.3%)

Municipal status
  - Municipal district: Plesetsky Municipal District
  - Rural settlement: Oksovskoye Rural Settlement
  - Capital of: Oksovskoye Rural Settlement
- Time zone: UTC+3 (MSK)
- Postal code: 164270
- Dialing code: +7 81832
- OKTMO ID: 11650416101

Oksovsky (Russian: Оксовский) is a rural locality (a settlement) in Plesetsky District of Arkhangelsk Oblast, Russia, located 28 kilometers (17 mi) west of Plesetsk, on the right bank of the Onega River. Within the framework of municipal divisions, it is the administrative center of Oksovskoye Rural Settlement, one of the thirteen rural settlements in the district. Population: 2,051 (2010 census); 2,207 (2002 census); 2,877 (1989 Soviet census)..

== Geography ==
Oksovsky is located on the right bank of the Onega River, several kilometers downstream from the mouth of the Iksa River, the left tributary of the Onega. On the left bank of the Onega, across Oksovsky, the urban-type settlement of Severoonezhsk is located.

== History ==
The former village of Navolok, close to Oksovsky, is a historical landmark. Before 1926, Navolotskaya Volost existed with the administrative center in Navolok. In 1926, the volost was transformed into a selsoviet, and on July 15, 1929 Plesetsky District was established. The administrative center of Oksovsky Selsoviet was located in the village of Navolok. In 1930, Oksovsky Selsoviet was merged with nearby Paberezhsky Selsoviet, and in 1961, the urban-type settlement of Oksovsky was established, and the selsoviet transformed into the settlement soviet. In 1985, the urban-type settlement of Severoonezhsk was established by splitting it from Oksovsky.

In the beginning of 1970, there were plans to build an aluminum production plant close to the bauxite deposits (which were discovered on the left bank of the Onega, currently Severoonezhsk). It was planned that the plant would be served by a city with the population of approximately 100,000, with the name of Severorossiysk, located on both banks of the Onega. The plans were supported by Hungary and Bulgaria, who were interested in becoming the shareholders. The plans have never been realized.

Oksovsky had work settlement status until it was demoted to a rural locality in February 2013.

== Economy ==
=== Industry ===
The economy of Oksovsky is based on forestry.

=== Transportation ===
Oksovsky (Navoloki railway station) is at the end of the railway line which connects in Puksa to the line between Moscow and Arkhangelsk (Konosha-Obozyorskaya stretch). There is a railway bridge to Severoonezhsk (Iksa railway station) across the Onega, connecting to the railway to the west, to Undozero and Yangory. This line is one of the biggest railways in Russia which does not belong to Russian Railways. The owner of the railway is the State Department of Corrections. Plans to extend this line to Medvezhyegorsk have not been realized.

Until the 1990s, the Onega was heavily used for timber rafting and logging, and Oksovsky was one of the points where timber was transported from the river.

There is a road connecting Oksovsky to the village of Denislavye located on the highway which is a historic trading route between Kargopol with Arkhangelsk. The highway also connects to Plesetsk.

The Onega is not navigable in Oksovsky because of the rapids.
