= Yangory =

Yangory Янгоры
- Settlement
- Location within Arkhangelsk Oblast Location within Russia
- Coordinates: 62°44′N 37°59′E
- Country: Russia
- Region: Arkhangelsk Oblast
- District: Plesetsky District
- Time zone: UTC+3:00

Yangory (Russian: Янгоры) is a rural locality (a settlement) in Undozerskoye Urban Settlement of Plesetsky District, Arkhangelsk Oblast, Russia. The population was 331 as of 2010.

== Geography ==
Yangory is located between Puga and Chyornaya Rivers, 143 km west of Plesetsk (the district's administrative centre) by road. Undozero is the nearest rural locality.
