= Konyovo, Arkhangelsk Oblast =

Konyovo Конёво
- Selo
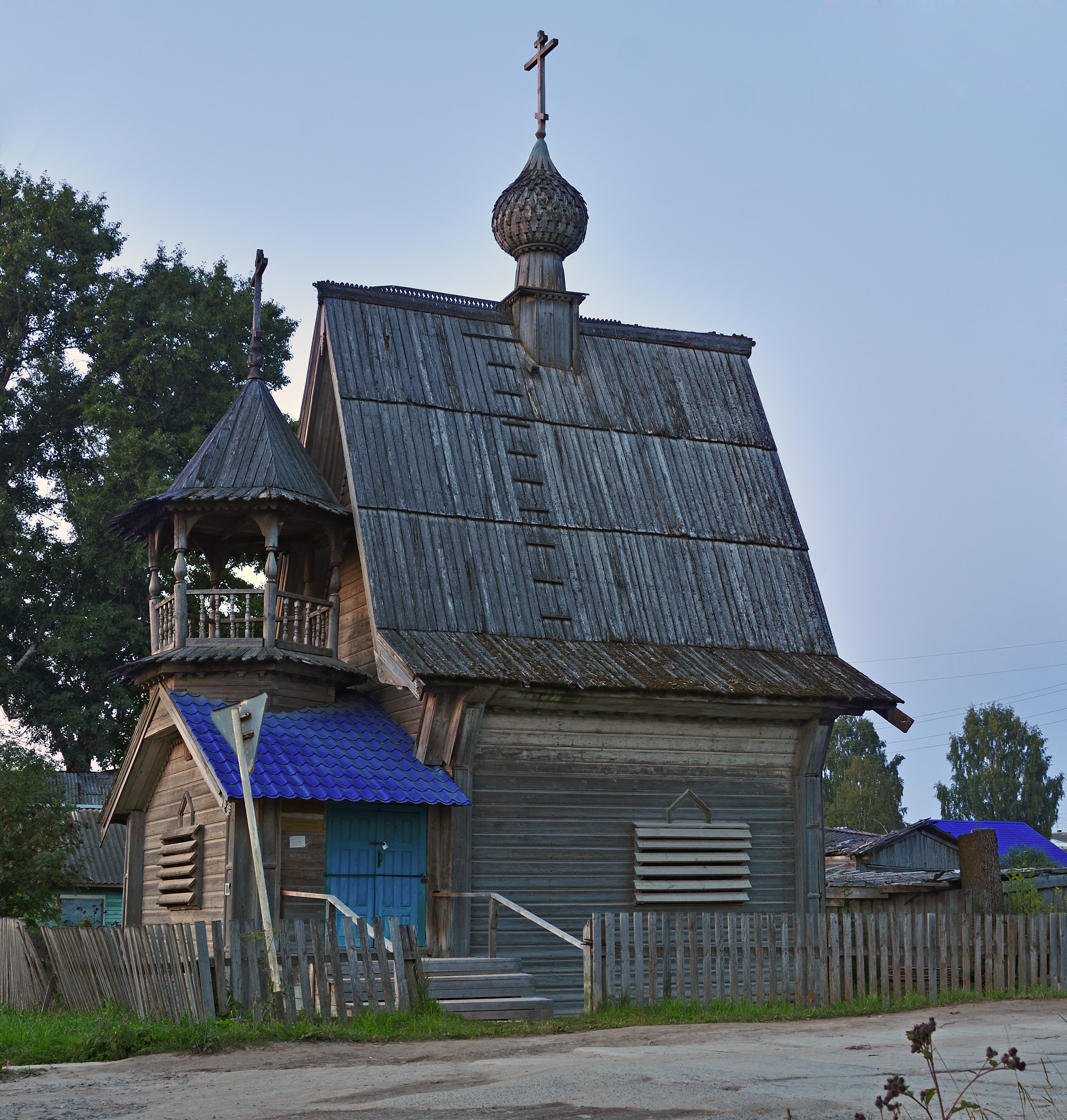
- Chapel in Konyovo

- Location within Arkhangelsk Oblast Location within Russia
- Coordinates: 62°07′N 39°19′E
- Country: Russia
- Region: Arkhangelsk Oblast
- District: Plesetsky District
- Time zone: UTC+3:00

Konyovo (Russian: Конёво) is a rural locality (a selo) and the administrative center of Konyovskoye Rural Settlement of Plesetsky District, Arkhangelsk Oblast, Russia. The population was 2,838 as of 2010. There are 23 streets.

== Geography ==
Konyovo is located on the Onega River, 92 km southwest of Plesetsk (the district's administrative centre) by road. Avdotyino is the nearest rural locality.
