= Yarnema =

Yarnema Ярнема
- Village
- Location within Arkhangelsk Oblast Location within Russia
- Coordinates: 62°57′N 39°21′E
- Country: Russia
- Region: Arkhangelsk Oblast
- District: Plesetsky District
- Time zone: UTC+3:00

Yarnema (Russian: Ярнема) is a rural locality (a village) in Yarnemskoye Rural Settlement of Plesetsky District, Arkhangelsk Oblast, Russia. The population was 160 as of 2010. There are 5 streets.

== Geography ==
Yarnema is located on the Onega River, 83 km northwest of Plesetsk (the district's administrative centre) by road. Ig is the nearest rural locality.
