= Kodina =

Kodina Russian: Кодина

Location
- Country: Russia

Physical characteristics
- Mouth: Onega
  - coordinates: 63°37′49″N 39°03′24″E
- Length: 183 km (114 mi)
- Basin size: 2,700 km^{2} (1,000 sq mi)
- Discharge
  - average: 20 cubic metres per second (710 cu ft/s)

Basin features
- Progression: Onega→ White Sea

The Kodina (Russian: Кодина) is a river in Primorsky and Onezhsky Districts of Arkhangelsk Oblast in Russia. It is a right tributary of the Onega. It is 183 kilometres (114 mi) long, and the area of its basin 2,700 square kilometres (1,000 sq mi). The main tributaries of the Kodina are the Senzera, the Vychera, and the Ramenga (all from the right).

The river basin of the Kodina comprises the north-eastern part of Onezhsky District as well as area in the south of Primorsky District and in the north of Plesetsky District.

The source of the Kodina is in the swamps in the southern part of Primorsky District, about a dozen kilometers southeast of Lake Voyozero (which belongs to the Northern Dvina basin, not to the Onega Basin). The river flows in the southern direction, enters Onezhsky District and turns southwest. It is populated downstream from the selo of Kodino. The mouth of the Kodina is in the place where the Onega is separated into two streams (the Kodina empties into the eastern one), downstream from the village of Antsiferovsky Bor.

The Kodina flows in the coniferous forests (taiga), and until the 1990s, the river was used for timber rafting. Downstream from Kodino, there are occasional open areas and floodplains, occupied by meadows.
