= Ulitino, Arkhangelsk Oblast =

Ulitino Улитино
- Settlement
- Location within Arkhangelsk Oblast Location within Russia
- Coordinates: 62°58′N 39°19′E
- Country: Russia
- Region: Arkhangelsk Oblast
- District: Plesetsky District
- Time zone: UTC+3:00

Ulitino (Russian: Улитино) is a rural locality (a settlement) in Plesetsky District, Arkhangelsk Oblast, Russia. The population was 493 as of 2010. There are 12 streets.

== Geography ==
Ulitino is located on the Onega River, 94 km northwest of Plesetsk (the district's administrative centre) by road. Ig is the nearest rural locality.
