= Voloshka (river) =

- Native name: Волошка (Russian)

Location
- Country: Russia

Physical characteristics
- Mouth: Onega
  - coordinates: 61°41′58″N 39°14′17″E
  - elevation: 96 m (315 ft)
- Length: 260 km (160 mi)
- Basin size: 7,100 km^{2} (2,700 sq mi)
- Discharge
  - average: 71.7 m^{3}/s (2,530 cu ft/s)

Basin features
- Progression: Onega→ White Sea

The Onega River basin

The Voloshka (Russian: Волошка) is a river in Konoshsky and Kargopolsky Districts of Arkhangelsk Oblast in Russia. It is a right tributary of the Onega. It is 260 kilometres (160 mi) long, and the area of its basin is 7,100 square kilometres (2,700 sq mi). Its major tributaries are the Vokhtomitsa (right), the Leybusha (left), and the Bolshaya Porma (right).

The river basin of the Voloshka includes the eastern part of the Kargopolsky District, the western part of the Konoshsky District, and the south-western part of the Nyandomsky District which is a vast and sparsely populated area.

The source of the Voloshka is located in the south-east of Kargopolsky District, east of the Lake Lacha. The river flows south and enters Konoshsky District. In the village of Kementsevo it turns north-east and eventually enters the swampy unpopulated area. After accepting the Vokhtomitsa from the right, it sharply turns north-west. In the mouth of the Komzha River, on both banks there is the settlement of Voloshka, which until 2005 was an urban-type settlement and later downgraded a to rural-type settlement. North of Voloshka, the river turns west, re-enters Kargopolsky District, and until the mouth of the Leibusha, there are no villages. After accepting the Leibusha, the Voloshka turns west, then again north. There is a group of villages north of the mouth of the Leybusha, but north of these villages, the Voloshka enters the swamps again, and the valley is not populated. In this area, there are rapids on the river. Downstream from the mouth of the Bolshaya Porma, the Voloshka turns west, and there is a continuous chain of villages down to its mouth across the Onega from the selo of Bronevo.
