= Yemtsa (river) =

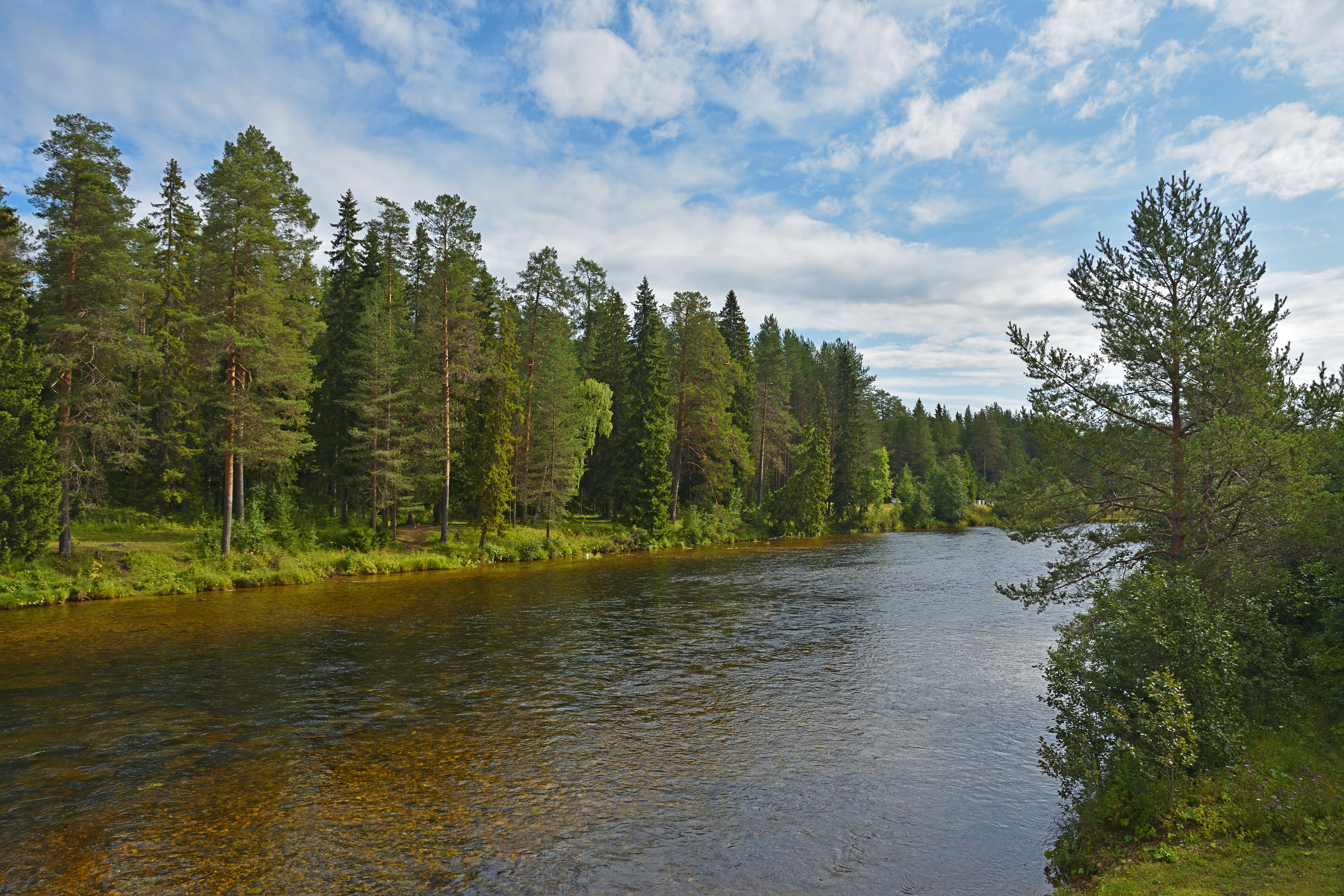
- Native name: Емца (Russian)

Location
- Country: Russia

Physical characteristics
- Mouth: Northern Dvina
  - coordinates: 63°32′31″N 41°53′12″E
- Length: 188 km (117 mi)
- Basin size: 14,100 km^{2} (5,400 mi^{2})
- Discharge
  - average: 70 m^{3}/s (2,500 cu ft/s)

Basin features
- Progression: Northern Dvina→ White Sea

Map of the Northern Dvina basin. Yemtsa is shown on the map

The Yemtsa (Russian: Емца) is a river in Plesetsky and Kholmogorsky Districts and in the town of Mirny of Arkhangelsk Oblast in Russia. It is a left tributary of the Northern Dvina. It is 188 kilometres (117 mi) long, and the area of its basin 14,100 square kilometres (5,400 sq mi). Its main tributaries are the Mekhrenga (right), the Tyogra (left), the Vaymuga (left), and the Bolshaya Chacha (right).

The river basin of the Yemtsa occupies the east of the Plesetsky District, the south of the Kholmogorsky District, and some areas in the northern parts of the Nyandomsky and Shenkursky Districts. In addition, the territory subordinate to the town of Mirny lies entirely within the limits of the river basin of the Yemtsa. In the low course, the Yemtsa bounds from the south the Siysky Zakaznik, a federal nature protected area.

The source of the Yemtsa is in Plesetsky District, north-west of the settlement of Plesetsk and several kilometers east of the Onega (which does not belong to the Northern Dvina basin). The Yemtsa flows to north-east. The urban-type settlement of Savinsky is located on the right bank of the river. Note that the urban-type settlement and the railway station of Yemtsa is not located on the river. Downstream from Savinsky, the Yemtsa crosses into the territory of the town of Mirny, and from there into Kholmogorsky District, where it accepts from the right its biggest tributary, the Mekhrenga. Close to the mouth, the historical selo of Yemetsk, a former uyezd and district center, is located on the left bank.

The lower 10 kilometres (6 mi) of the river course (downstream from the selo of Yemetsk) are navigable.
