= Podvolochye, Arkhangelsk Oblast =

Podvolochye Подволочье
- Village
- Location within Arkhangelsk Oblast Location within Russia
- Coordinates: 62°48′N 41°09′E
- Country: Russia
- Region: Arkhangelsk Oblast
- District: Plesetsky District
- Time zone: UTC+3:00

Podvolochye (Russian: Подволочье) is a rural locality (a village) in Plesetsky District, Arkhangelsk Oblast, Russia. The population was 113 as of 2010.

== Geography ==
Podvolochye is located on the Puksa River, 113 km east of Plesetsk (the district's administrative centre) by road. Alekseyevskaya is the nearest rural locality.
