= Mekhrenga =

River in Arkhangelsk Oblast, Russia

Mekhrenga Russian: Мехреньга
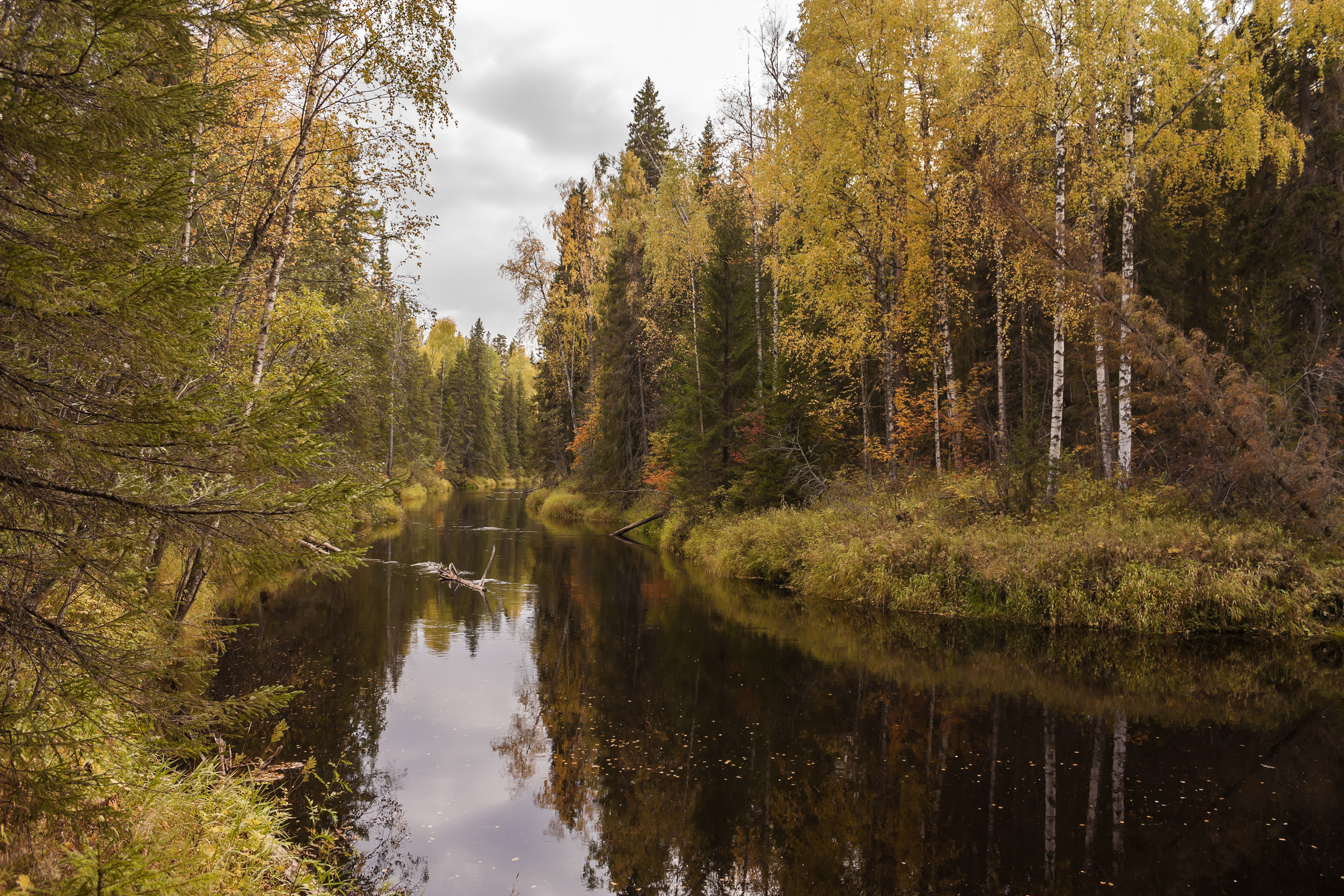

Location
- Country: Russia

Physical characteristics
- Mouth: Yemtsa
  - coordinates: 63°15′36″N 41°20′42″E
  - elevation: 12 m (39 ft)
- Length: 231 km (144 mi)
- Basin size: 5,080 km^{2} (1,960 sq mi)
- Discharge
  - average: 33 cubic metres per second (1,200 cu ft/s)

Basin features
- Progression: Yemtsa→ Northern Dvina→ White Sea

Map of the Northern Dvina basin. Mekhrenga is shown on the map

The Mekhrenga (Russian: Мехреньга) is a river in Plesetsky and Kholmogorsky Districts and in the town of Mirny of Arkhangelsk Oblast in Russia. It is a left tributary of the Yemtsa. It is 231 kilometres (144 mi) long, and the area of its basin 5,080 square kilometres (1,960 sq mi). The principal tributaries of the Mekhrenga are the Shorda (left), the Myagdoma (right), and the Puksa (left).

The Mekhrenga is the biggest tributary of the Yemtsa, and is actually longer than the Yemtsa. Its river basin covers the northern part of the Nyandomsky District, the south-eastern part of the Plesetsky District, and the southern part of the Kholmogorsky District.

The source of the Mekhrenga is in the south of the Plesetsky District, close to the border with the Nyandomsly District, several kilometers to the west of the village of Saltozero. It flows east, passes two lakes (Lake Ora and Lake Chyolmus) and then turns north. Downstream from the lakes, the valley of the Mekhrenga is populated, except for the stretch of the river within the town limits of Mirny. The mouth of the Mekhrenga is located in the village of Ust-Mekhrenga.
