= Lomovoye, Arkhangelsk Oblast =

Lomovoye Ломовое
- Settlement
- Location within Arkhangelsk Oblast Location within Russia
- Coordinates: 64°00′N 40°39′E
- Country: Russia
- Region: Arkhangelsk Oblast
- District: Plesetsky District
- Time zone: UTC+3:00

Lomovoye (Russian: Ломовое) is a rural locality (a settlement) in Samodedskoye Rural Settlement of Plesetsky District, Arkhangelsk Oblast, Russia. The population was 425 as of 2010. There are 12 streets.

== Geography ==
Lomovoye is located 186 km north of Plesetsk (the district's administrative centre) by road. Tundra is the nearest rural locality.
