= Lake Undozero =

Lake in Arkhangelsk Oblast, Russia

- Ундозеро (Russian)
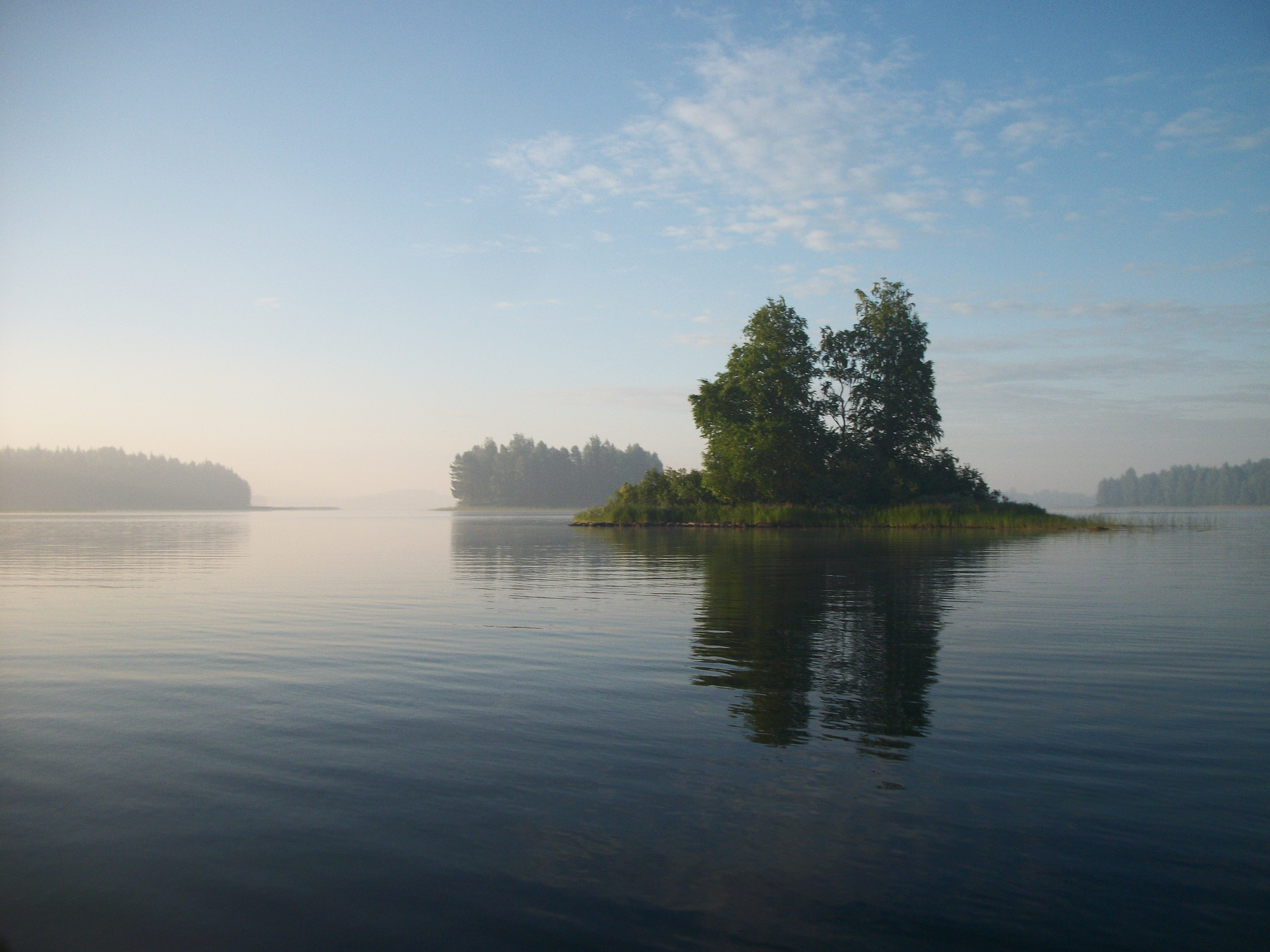
- Lake in July 2011.

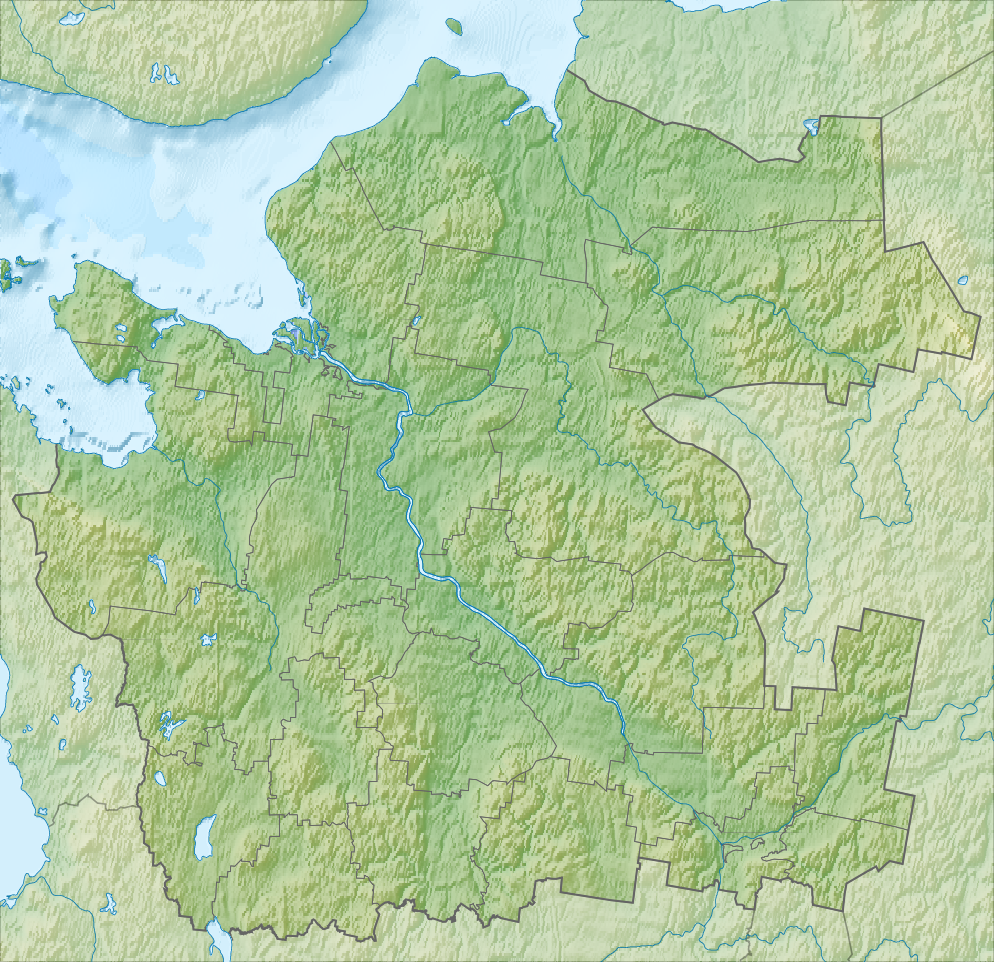
- Location within Arkhangelsk Oblast
- Location: Arkhangelsk Oblast
- Coordinates: 62°38′N 38°47′E
- Primary inflows: Lopa
- Primary outflows: Undosha
- Catchment area: 709 square kilometres (274 mi^{2})
- Basin countries: Russia
- Surface area: 44.7 square kilometres (17.3 mi^{2})
- Surface elevation: 118 m (387 ft)

Lake Undozero (Russian: Ундозеро) is a freshwater lake, located in the west of Plesetsky District of Arkhangelsk Oblast in Russia. It is one of the biggest lakes in Arkhangelsk Oblast and the second biggest one in Plesetsky District. The area of the lake is 44.7 square kilometres (17.3 mi^{2}), and the area of its basin is 709 square kilometres (274 mi^{2}). Lake Undozero is the source of the Undosha, which belongs to the river basin of the Onega and thus to the White Sea basin.

The lake has a sophisticated shape and contains a number of islands. The source of the Undosha is in the south-western corner. The main tributary of the lake is the Lopa, which shortly upstream from the mouth accepts from the left a major tributary, the Yonza.

There are three villages on Lake Undozero, Skarlakhta, Pogost, and Mezen. Skarlakhta is connected by the railroad to the east via the settlement of Severoonezhsk with the railway station Puksa located on the railway line between Vologda and Arkhangelsk. The same railroad continues west to the village of Yangory. There have been plans to extend it west to Medvezhyegorsk, but these have never been realized. The railway belongs to the Department of corrections, and as a matter of fact, there are settlements around the village of Skarlakhta inhabited by convicted criminals who have previously served a part of their jail term. There is a regular passenger traffic on the railroad. There was an air field in Pogost. There are no all-season roads connecting Undozero with the main road network.

Undozero is popular as a starting point for rafting down the Undosha. Almost the whole course of the Undosha is not populated, with the exception of Lake Undozero and a number of villages close to its mouth at Lake Pochozero. (Downstream from Lake Pochozero, the Undosha changes its name to the Pocha and flows to Lake Kenozero). Therefore, the rafters start in Skarlakhta and finish at Lake Kenozero. Before the railroad was constructed in the 1970s, the only way to get to Undozero for the rafters was to start in Severoonezhsk, take rafts upstream the Iksa, and then bring them to Undozero by land.
