= Letneozersky (air base) =

Airport in Arkhangelsk Oblast, Obozersky

Letneozersky
- Obozersky, Arkhangelsk Oblast in Russia
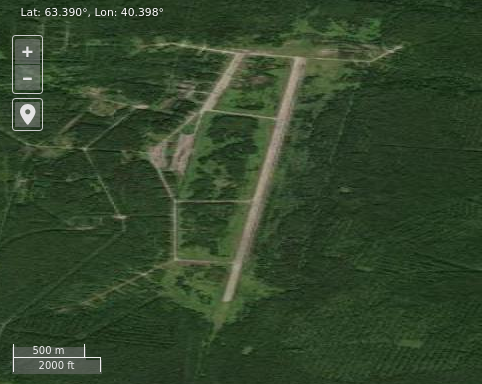
- Satellite imagery of the former Letneozersky airbase

Site information
- Type: Air Base
- Owner: Ministry of Defence
- Operator: Russian Air Force

Location
- Shown within Arkhangelsk Oblast Letneozersky (Russia)
- Coordinates: 63°23′24″N 40°23′54″E

Site history
- Built: 1960
- In use: 1960 - 1994

Airfield information
- Elevation: 99 metres (325 ft) AMSL
Runways
| Direction | Length and surface |
|---|---|
| 07/25 | 2,500 metres (8,202 ft) Concrete |

Letneozersky (also Letneozerskiy, Obozersky Southeast (US)) is a former interceptor air base located 8 km (5 miles) southeast of Obozersky, Arkhangelsk Oblast, Russia.

It was home to the 524th Fighter Aviation Regiment, 23rd Air Defence Division (Arkhangelsk), 10th Independent Air Defence Army, with up to 27 Mikoyan-Gurevich MiG-25 (NATO: Foxbat) interceptor aircraft based at the airfield during the 1980s. It features two major revetment areas holding over 15 aircraft each. The base provided air defense cover for the airspace around Arkhangelsk and Plesetsk Cosmodrome.

The regiment was disbanded in 1994.

== See also ==
- List of military airbases in Russia
