= North Onezhsky mine =

Bauxite mine in Severoonezhsk, Arkhangelsk, Russia

- Interactive map of North Onezhsky mine
- Location: Severoonezhsk, Arkhangelsk Oblast, Russia; 62.573°N 39.728°E
- Products: Bauxite
- Company: OAOA "Severo-Onezhsky Boksitovy Rudnik" (ОАО «Северо-Онежский бокситовый рудник»)
- Website: http://usscompany.ru/node/2

The North Onezhsky mine (Russian: Северо-Онежский бокситовый рудник, Severo-Onezhsky Boksitovy Rundnik) is a large mine located in the northern part of Russia in Arkhangelsk Oblast. It operates on one of the sections of the Iksinskoye bauxite deposit (Иксинское месторождение).

North Onezhsky represents one of the largest bauxite reserve in Russia and one of the largest in Europe, having estimated reserves of 120 million tonnes.

The miners' town near the mine is called Severoonezhsk.
