= Plestsy Airport =

Plestsy
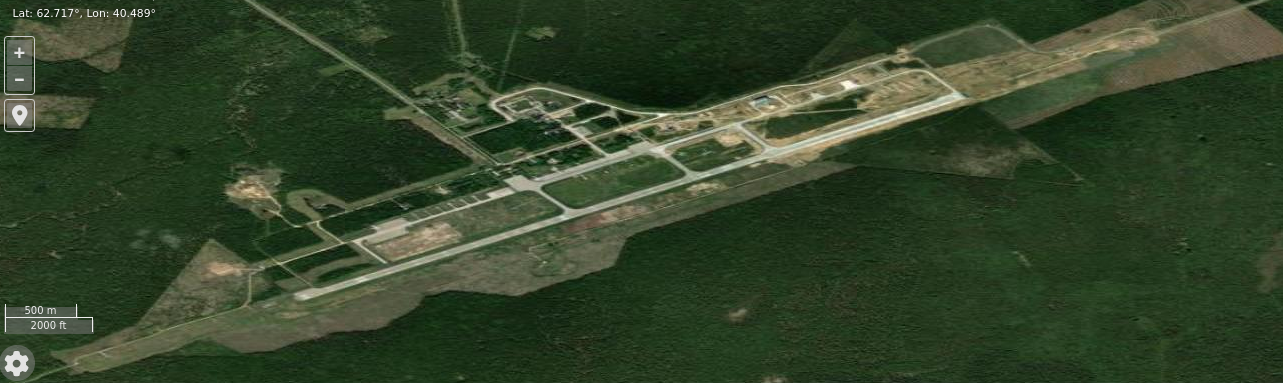
- Satellite imagery of Plestsy Airport

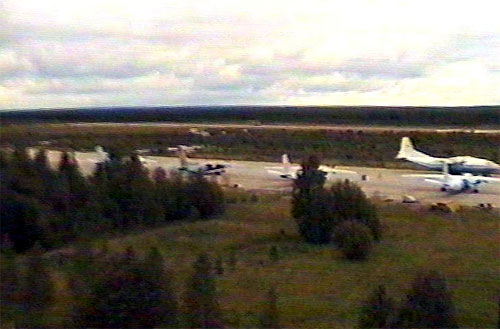
- Plestsy Airport in 1998
- IATA: none; ICAO: none

Summary
- Owner: Russian Government
- Serves: Plesetsk
- Elevation AMSL: 427 ft / 130 m
- Coordinates: 62°43′0″N 40°29′18″E

Map
- Location within Russia

Runways
Direction	Length		Surface
Direction	ft	m	Surface
04/22		3,500	Concrete

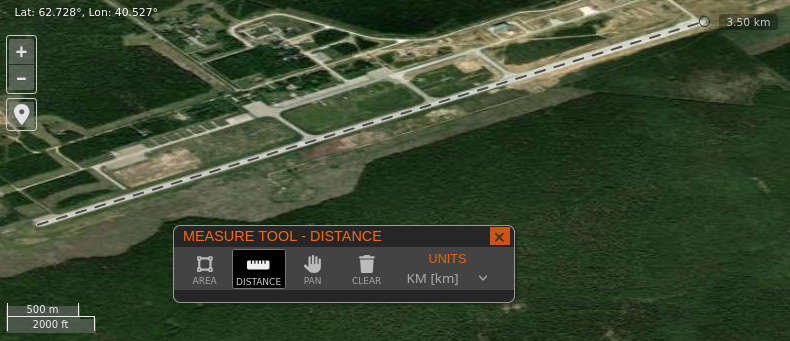
Satellite imagery shows the runway to be extended to 3500 m and renamed to 04/22

Plestsy Airport (Russian: Плесцы), also Pero (Russian: Перо — "feather"), is an airport in Russia located 10 kilometres (6.2 miles) east of Plesetsk. It is a logistical base for the Plesetsk Cosmodrome launch facility.

In 2004-2005 it was modernized: radio and illumination equipment at the airfield were replaced, the power supply and communications systems were rebuilt, the runway was elongated by 600 metres (2,000 feet) in 2003 and 2004 (now 2,600 metres (8,500 feet) long), 2 kilometres (6,600 feet) of concrete plates were also replaced. The total cost of this work was $18.2 million.

The name comes from nearby Lake Plestsy. The closed town of Mirny is also situated in the area.

The airport is still in operation as a private airport and was never a main airport.

== History ==
In December 1958, the 156th separate mixed air squadron was formed at the Angara proving ground (now the Plesetsk cosmodrome), and in August 1966 it was reorganized into the 17th separate mixed air regiment.

Until the early 1990s, the airfield wore the code name "Feather". In some sources it is mentioned under the name “Plestsy” (after the name of a nearby lake), on the English-speaking maps it is designated as “Plestsy Airport”.

In 2004, the airfield was reconstructed: the light-signal and radio-technical equipment was replaced, strengthened and extended by 600 m runway, which allows the airfield to receive aircraft types Il-76, Tu-154 and lighter, as well as helicopters of all types. The maximum take-off weight of the aircraft is 200 tons.

Previously, An-26, An-30, An-72, An-12 airplanes and Mil Mi-8 helicopters from the structure of the former 17th separate mixed air regiment (military unit 32177) were based here. Then the 17th separate mixed air squadron (military unit 34185) was formed.

In January 2014, the 17th OSAE was liquidated along with one of the country's few technical maintenance units and redeployed to 33 OTSAP (Levashovo (air base)) in Vyborgsky district of St. Petersburg, which does not have such infrastructure. And at the airfield Plesetsk formed the aviation commandant's office, which is also part of 33 OTSAP. In August 2015, the aviation commandant's office of the Plesetsk airfield was reassigned to 7050 base of the Northern Fleet.

== See also ==
- List of airports in Russia
