= Onega (river) =

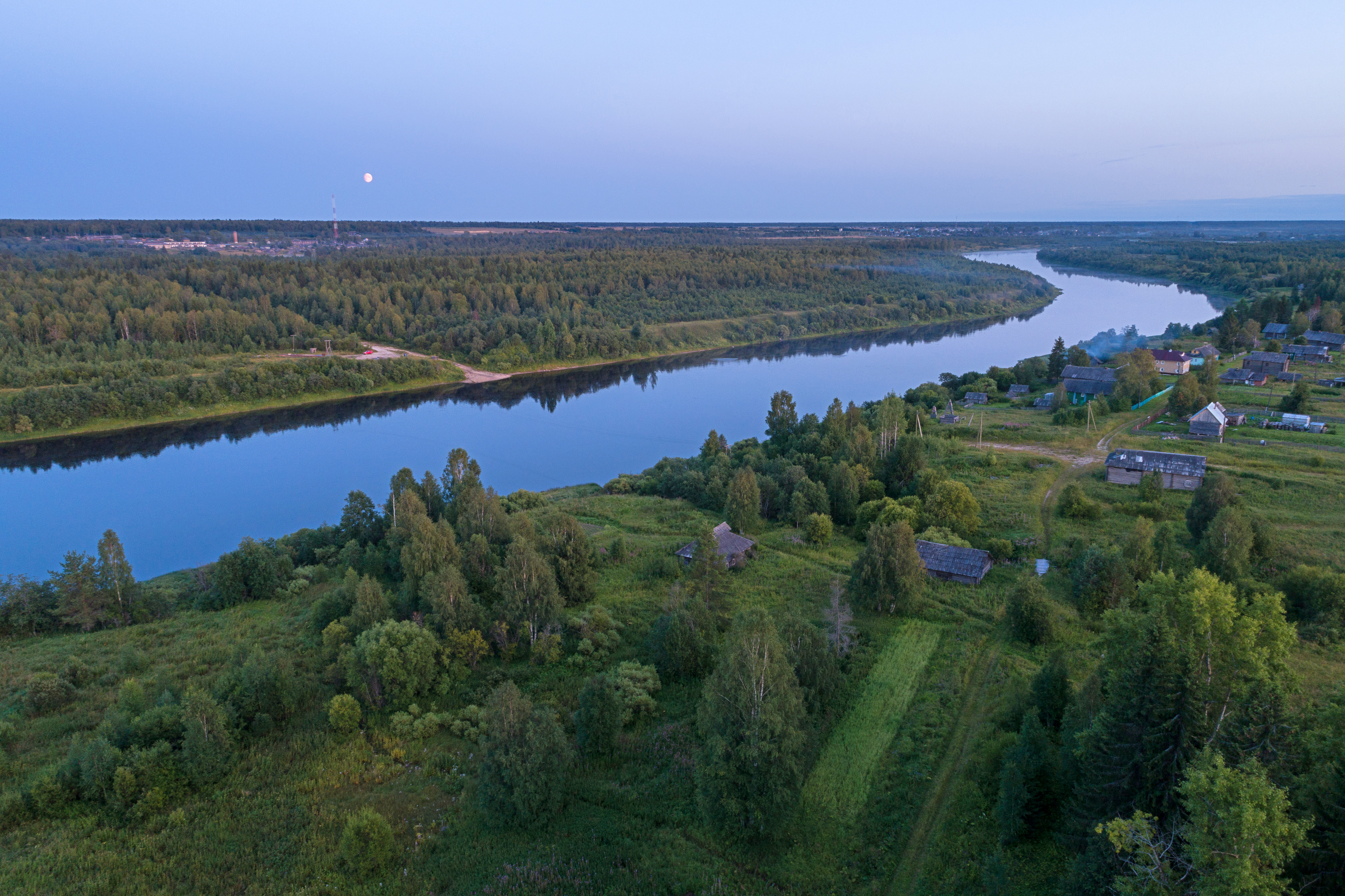
- The Onega in Plesetsky District
- Native name: Онега (Russian)

Location
- Country: Russia

Physical characteristics
- Source
  - location: Lake Lacha
  - elevation: 117 m (384 ft)
- Mouth: White Sea
  - coordinates: 63.9332°N 37.9908°E
  - elevation: 0 m (0 ft)
- Length: 416 km (258 mi)
- Basin size: 56,900 km^{2} (22,000 sq mi)
- Discharge
  - average: 505 m^{3}/s (17,800 cu ft/s)

The Onega (Russian: Оне́га; Finnish: Äänisjoki) is a river in Kargopolsky, Plesetsky, and Onezhsky Districts of Arkhangelsk Oblast in Russia. The Onega connects Lake Lacha with the Onega Bay in the White Sea southwest of Arkhangelsk, flowing in the northern direction. The discharge at the source is 74.1 cubic metres per second (2,620 cu ft/s) and at the mouth is 505 cubic metres per second (17,800 cu ft/s). The river is 416 kilometres (258 mi) long, and the area of its basin 56,900 square kilometres (22,000 sq mi). Its main tributaries are the Voloshka (right), the Kena (left), the Mosha (right), the Kodina (right), and the Kozha (left). The major tributary of the Lake Lacha is the Svid.

The Onega basin

In terms of both area of the basin and the average discharge, the Onega is the third river basin of the White Sea (behind the Northern Dvina and the Mezen). The river basin of the Onega is spread over the west of Arkhangelsk Oblast, north-west of Vologda Oblast, and also includes minor areas in the east of Republic of Karelia. The Onega basin includes some of the biggest lakes of Arkhangelsk and Vologda Oblasts, such as Lake Vozhe, Lake Lacha, Lake Lyokshmozero, Lake Kenozero, Lake Undozero, and Lake Kozhozero, as well as Kenozersky National Park.

The whole valley of the Onega is populated, with the exception of the stretch between Severoonezhsk and Yarnema, in Plesetsky District. There are two towns located on the river Onega, Kargopol close to its source and Onega in its mouth. There are also two urban-type settlements, located opposite to each other in the middle course of the river, Oksovsky (right bank) and Severoonezhsk (left bank). 155 kilometres (96 mi) of the river's lower course, between the village of Gorodok and the selo of Porog, is listed in the State Water Register of Russia as navigable. The rest of the Onega is notable for the rapids, spread everywhere between Kargopol and Gorodok, and also located downstream from Porog (the name Porog means a rapid).

The river name is traditionally explained as related to Finnish Enojoki - the main river, stream. The Onega basin area has an important historical and cultural significance. Kargopol is one of the oldest cities in Russian North (the traditional foundation date in the 12th century, first mentioned in the 14th century), and it still contains a big number of architectural and historical monuments. Oshevensk on the left bank of the Onega is the location of the former Alexandro-Oshevensky Monastery. Another historically important monastery in the Onega basin is the Kozheozersky Monastery on an island in the Lake Kozheozero. Some of the finest monuments of the northern wooden architecture are located in the basin of the Onega, including ensembles of Lyadiny, Saunino Pogost, Krasnaya Lyaga, and Bolzhaya Shalga. These monuments also suffer from the lack of protection and their number steadily diminishes. In fact, the majority of them have been lost.

The river splits into the Big Onega and Little Onega 75 kilometres (47 mi) from its estuary, but then these branches join again, forming a big flat island.

It freezes up in late October - early December and stays under the ice until mid-April - May. It was used for timber rafting.

The Onega flows among the coniferous forests (taiga of spruce, pine, and larch), mostly among the swamps.

There are only four bridges across the Onega: one in Kargopol on the road connecting Kargopol to Nyandoma, one in the village of Sorokinskaya, on Onezhsky Trakt, the road connecting Kargopol to Plesetsk and Yemetsk, one combined road and railway bridge connecting Oksovsky and Severoonezhsk, and one railway bridge in Porog on the railway from Arkhangelsk to Belomorsk (no road traffic). Elsewhere, including the former district center of Konyovo, the Onega can only be traversed by ferry crossings.
