= Koryakino, Arkhangelsk Oblast =

Koryakino Корякино
- Village
- Location within Arkhangelsk Oblast Location within Russia
- Coordinates: 62°06′N 38°52′E
- Country: Russia
- Region: Arkhangelsk Oblast
- District: Plesetsky District
- Time zone: UTC+3:00

Koryakino (Russian: Корякино) is a rural locality (a village) in Plesetsky District, Arkhangelsk Oblast, Russia. The population was 233 as of 2010. There are 3 streets.

== Geography ==
Koryakino is located on the Kena River, 121 km southwest of Plesetsk (the district's administrative centre) by road. Stepanovskaya is the nearest rural locality.
