= Koryakino, Kirillovsky District, Vologda Oblast =

Koryakino Корякино
- Village
- Location within Vologda Oblast Location within Russia
- Coordinates: 59°48′N 38°50′E
- Country: Russia
- Region: Vologda Oblast
- District: Kirillovsky District
- Time zone: UTC+3:00

Koryakino (Russian: Корякино) is a rural locality (a village) in Nikolotorzhskoye Rural Settlement, Kirillovsky District, Vologda Oblast, Russia. The population was 6 as of 2002.

== Geography ==
Koryakino is located 36 km southeast of Kirillov (the district's administrative centre) by road. Matveyevskoye is the nearest rural locality.
