= Koryakino, Sheksninsky District, Vologda Oblast =

Koryakino Корякино
- Village
- Location within Vologda Oblast Location within Russia
- Coordinates: 59°23′N 38°46′E
- Country: Russia
- Region: Vologda Oblast
- District: Sheksninsky District
- Time zone: UTC+3:00

Koryakino (Russian: Корякино) is a rural locality (a village) in Sizemskoye Rural Settlement, Sheksninsky District, Vologda Oblast, Russia. The population was 18 as of 2002.

== Geography ==
Koryakino is located 71 km northeast of Sheksna (the district's administrative centre) by road. Pavlovskoye is the nearest rural locality.
