= Severoonezhsk =

Severoonezhsk Североонежск
- Urban-type settlement
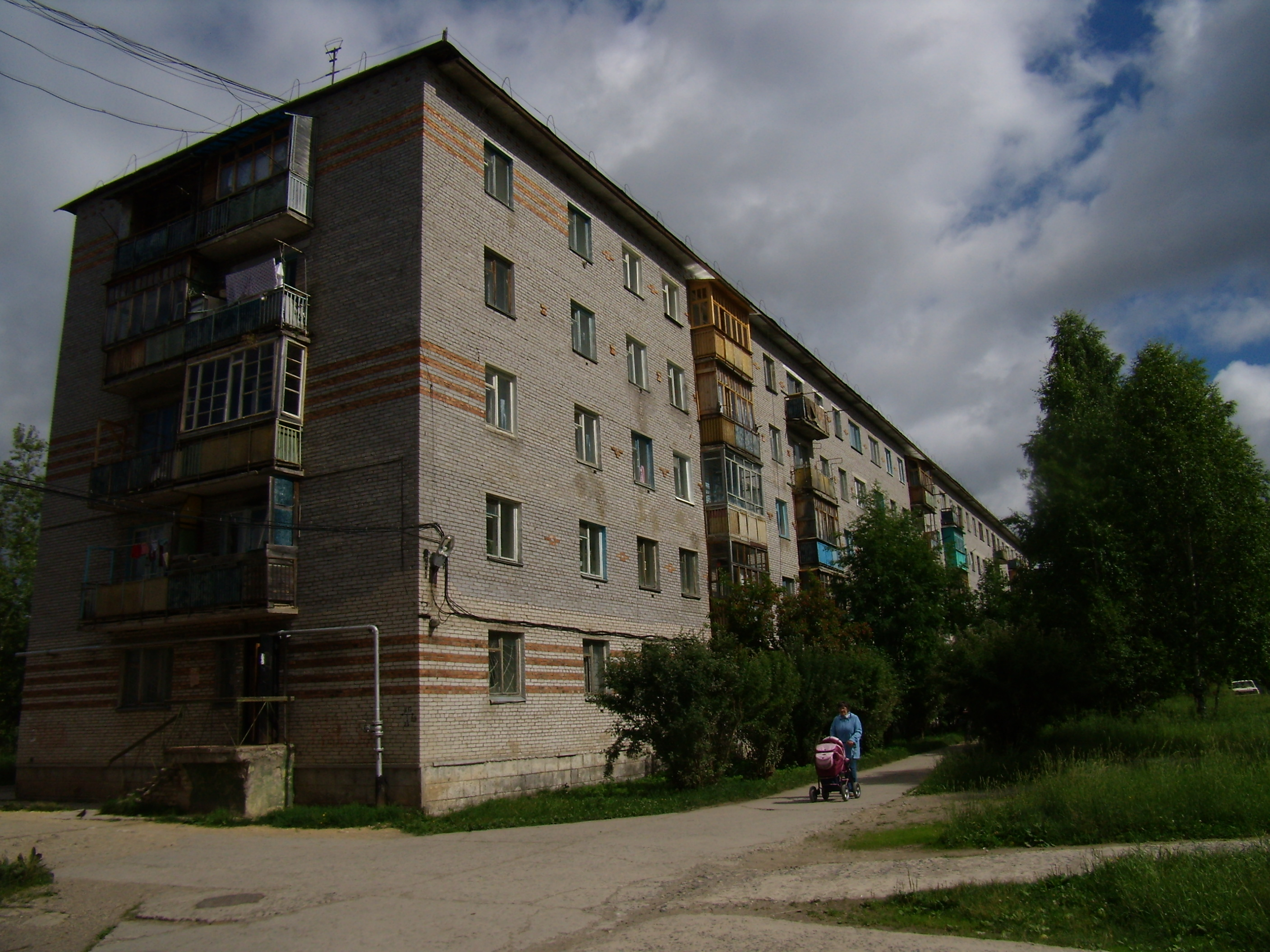
- view of houses in the town
- Interactive map of Severoonezhsk
- Location of Severoonezhsk Severoonezhsk (Arkhangelsk Oblast)
- Coordinates: 62°35′30″N 39°50′52″E
- Country: Russia
- Federal subject: Arkhangelsk Oblast
- Administrative district: Plesetsky District
- Founded: 1973

Population (2010 Census)
  - Total: 5,289
  - Estimate (2025): 4,551 (−14%)

Municipal status
  - Municipal district: Plesetsky Municipal District
  - Urban settlement: Severoonezhskoye Urban Settlement
  - Capital of: Severoonezhskoye Urban Settlement
- Time zone: UTC+3 (MSK)
- Postal code: 164268
- OKTMO ID: 11650188051

Severoonezhsk (Russian: Северооне́жск) is an urban locality (an urban-type settlement) in Plesetsky District of Arkhangelsk Oblast, Russia, located 55 kilometers (34 mi) west of the town of Mirny, on the left bank of the Onega River. Municipally, it is the administrative center of Severoonezhskoye Urban Settlement, one of the eight urban settlements in the district. Population: 5,289 (2010 census); 5,624 (2002 census); 6,223 (1989 Soviet census)..

== Geography ==
Severoonezhsk is located on the left bank of the Onega River, several kilometers downstream from the mouth of the Iksa River, the left tributary of the Onega. On the right bank of the Onega, across Severoonezhsk, stands the urban-type settlement of Oksovsky.

== History ==
The first house in Severoonezhsk was built in February 1973 shortly after huge deposits of bauxite were discovered. Until 1985, Severoonezhsk was subordinate to the urban-type settlement of Oksovsky. On July 8, 1985, Severoonezhsk was granted urban-type settlement status itself, and was split from Oksovsky; with its territory including the whole area on the left bank of the Onega which had been part of Oksovsky.

At the beginning of 1970, there were plans to build an aluminum production plant close to the bauxite deposits. It was planned that the plant would be served by a city with a population of approximately 100,000, with the name of Severorossiysk, located on both banks of the Onega. The plans were supported by Hungary and Bulgaria, who were interested in becoming the shareholders. The plans have never been realized.

== Economy ==
=== Industry ===
Bauxite extraction is the main industry in Severoonezhsk. The bauxites were discovered in the area in 1949, and the extraction (the North Onezhsky mine) began in 1978.

=== Transportation ===
Oksovsky (Navoloki railway station) is at the end of the railway line which connects in Puksa to the line between Moscow and Arkhangelsk (Konosha-Obozyorskaya stretch). There is a railway bridge from Severoonezhsk (Iksa railway station) to Oksovsky across the Onega, connecting to the railway to the west of Severoonezhsk, to Undozero and Yangory. This line (Zaonezhskaya Railroad) is one of the biggest railways in Russia which does not belong to Russian Railways. The owner of the railway is the State Department of Corrections. Plans to extend this line to Medvezhyegorsk have not been realized.

There is a road connecting Severoonezhsk to Oksovsky and further on to the highway which is a historic trading route between Kargopol with Arkhangelsk.

The Onega is not navigable at Severoonezhsk because of the rapids.

== Culture and recreation ==
The weekly newspaper of Plesetsky District, Kuryer Prionezhya (Russian: Курьер Прионежья), has been published since 1999. The editorial office is in Severoonezhsk.
