= Podvolochye, Pokrovsky Selsoviet, Velikoustyugsky District, Vologda Oblast =

Podvolochye Подволочье
- Village
- Location within Vologda Oblast Location within Russia
- Coordinates: 60°39′N 46°35′E
- Country: Russia
- Region: Vologda Oblast
- District: Velikoustyugsky District
- Time zone: UTC+3:00

Podvolochye (Russian: Подволочье) is a rural locality (a village) in Pokrovskoye Rural Settlement, Velikoustyugsky District, Vologda Oblast, Russia. The population was two as of 2002.
