= Morshchikhinskaya =

Morshchikhinskaya Морщихинская
- Village
- Location within Arkhangelsk Oblast Location within Russia
- Coordinates: 61°13′N 38°52′E
- Country: Russia
- Region: Arkhangelsk Oblast
- District: Kargopolsky District
- Time zone: UTC+3:00

Morshchikhinskaya (Russian: Морщихинская) is a rural locality (a village) in Kargopolsky District, Arkhangelsk Oblast, Russia. The population was 13 as of 2012.
