= Mirny, Arkhangelsk Oblast =

Closed town in Arkhangelsk Oblast, Russia

Mirny Мирный
- Town
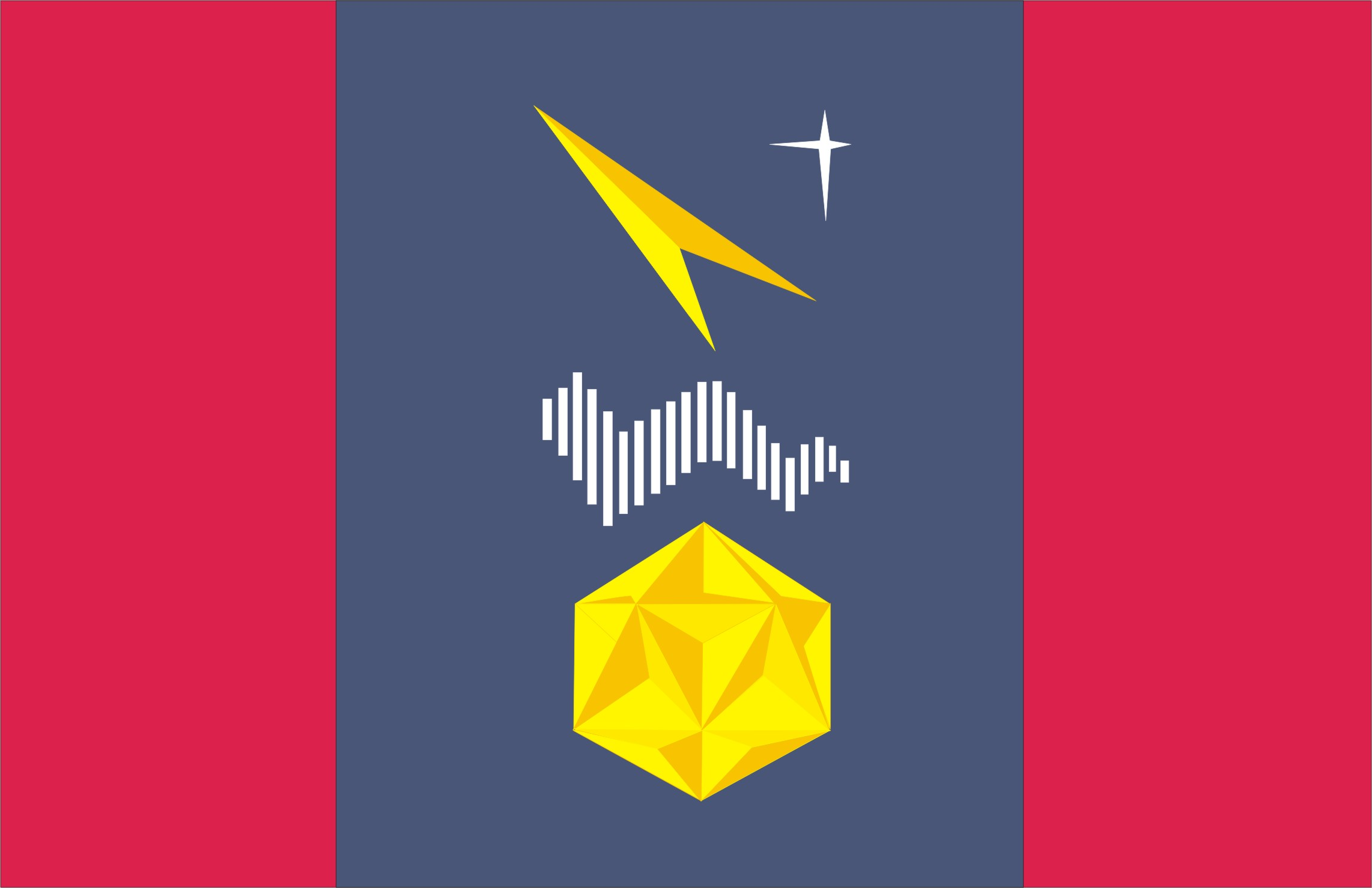
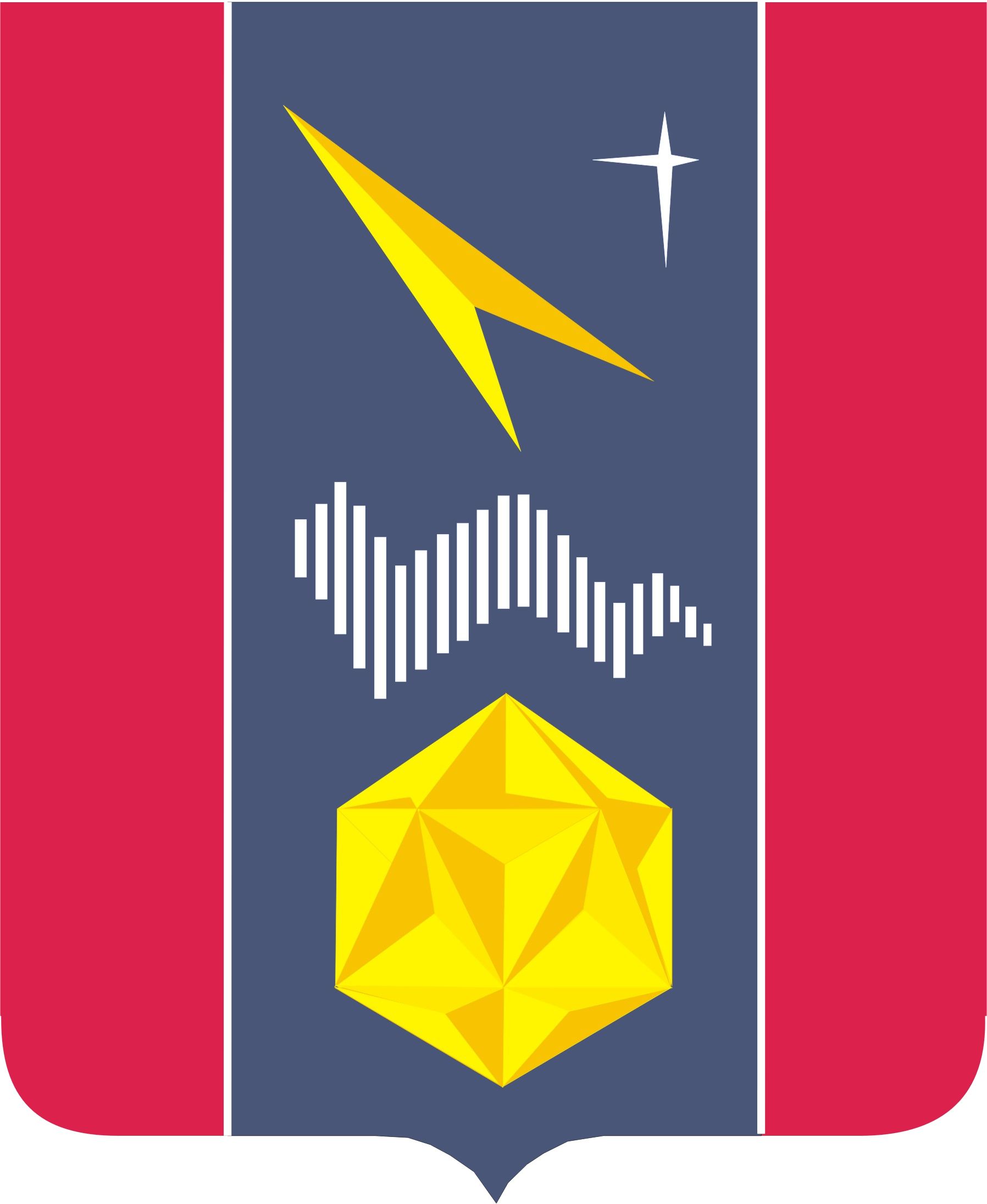
- Flag Coat of arms
- Interactive map of Mirny
- Location of Mirny Mirny (Arkhangelsk Oblast)
- Coordinates: 62°46′N 40°20′E
- Country: Russia
- Federal subject: Arkhangelsk Oblast
- Founded: November 23, 1960
- Town status since: February 2, 1966

Government
  - Body: Council of Town's Deputies

Population (2010 Census)
  - Total: 30,280
  - Estimate (2023): 27,174 (−10.3%)

Administrative status
  - Subordinated to: town of oblast significance of Mirny
  - Capital of: town of oblast significance of Mirny

Municipal status
  - Urban okrug: Mirny Urban Okrug
  - Capital of: Mirny Urban Okrug
- Time zone: UTC+3 (MSK)
- Postal codes: 164170-164173, 164182–164184, 164188
- Dialing code: +7 81834
- OKTMO ID: 11725000001
- Website: mirniy.ru

Mirny (Russian: Мирный, IPA: [ˈmʲirnɨj], lit. peaceful) is a closed town in the west of Arkhangelsk Oblast, Russia, serving the Plesetsk Cosmodrome. The town is located 9 kilometers (5.6 mi) from the urban-type settlement of Plesetsk and is connected to it by a road and a railway. urban railway station is located within the town, being a terminus to cosmodrome's vast railway system. The Plestsy Airport is also located nearby. Population: 30,280 (2010 census); 30,502 (2002 census).

== Location and geography ==
The area administered by the town borders with Kholmogorsky District in the north, Vinogradovsky District in the east, and Plesetsky District in the south and in the west. The area is elongated from the east to the west and is approximately 50 kilometers (31 mi) long and 20 kilometers (12 mi) wide. The town proper is located in the extreme southwestern end of the area. The Yemtsa River flows in the north of the area, whereas the Mekhrenga River crosses it south to north in the eastern part. The whole area belongs to the Northern Dvina River basin. Except for the military installations, it is covered by coniferous forest (taiga).

== History ==
In 1957, an area for the settlement for ballistic missile launch site workers was designated. In 1958, the population of the area, about 4,000, was resettled; the same year the construction started. On November 23, 1960 the settlement of Mirny was established. In 1966, with the development of the cosmodrome, it was designated a closed town. Mirny was never mentioned in the media before 1983.

== Administrative and municipal status ==
Within the framework of administrative divisions, it is incorporated as the town of oblast significance of Mirny—an administrative unit with the status equal to that of the districts. As a municipal division, the town of oblast significance of Mirny is incorporated as Mirny Urban Okrug.
