= Brin-Navolok =

Town in Arkhangelsk Oblast, Russia

Brin-Navolok Брин-Наволок
- Town
- Interactive map of Brin-Navolok
- Location of Brin-Navolok Brin-Navolok (Arkhangelsk Oblast)
- Coordinates: 63°44′05″N 41°24′34″E
- Country: Russia
- Federal subject: Arkhangelsk Oblast
- Administrative district: Kholmogory District
- Town of district subordinationSelsoviet: Brin-Navolok
- First mentioned: 1734
- Town status since: 1962

Government
  - mayor: Tatyana Ivanchenkova

Area
  - Total: 24 km^{2} (9.3 sq mi)
- Elevation: 26 m (85 ft)

Population (2010 Census)
  - Total: 12,854
  - Estimate (2012): 1,045 (−91.9%)
  - Density: 540/km^{2} (1,400/sq mi)
- Time zone: UTC+3 (MSK)
- Postal code: 164550-164777
- Dialing code: +7 (8183)
- OKTMO ID: 11656440101
- Website: web.archive.org/web/20160109223848/http://brin-navolok.ru/

Brín-Navolok (Russian: Брин-Наволок) is a town in northern Russia, located in the Arkhangelsk region. It is the namesake of the Brin-Navolok municipality, as well as its administrative and geographical centre.

== Geography ==
Brin-Navolok is situated on the west bank of the Northern Dvina Bay, about 130 km South-East of Arkhangelsk and 1,125 km North-East of Moscow. The nearest settlement is 34 km from the village of Emetsk, and 28 km from the nearest railway station in Kholmogory.

The town covers a total area of 19 square kilometers.

Brin-Navolok is the origin point of the route R1, beginning at the intersection of Federal highway M8, passing through the Kenozero national Park, and ending in the village of Prokshino

The Russian reserve and the Antony of Siya monastery are located 19 km from Brin-Navolok.

=== Time zone ===
Brin-Navolok, as well as all of the Arkhangelsk region, run on Moscow Time Zone(MSK/MSD).

=== Climate ===
Brin-Navolok's climate is that of the far North.

The climate is temperate, maritime, with long, moderately cold winters and short, cool summers. It is formed under the influence of the Northern seas and transfers air masses with Atlantic in small quantities solar radiation. The average January temperature is -12.8°C; in July it is 16.3 °C. The annual rainfall is 607 mm. The average annual temperature is 1.3 °C.

The climate is characterized by frequent weather changes, high humidity and a large number of days with precipitation. Although the cold air from the Siberian winter brings the temperature to around -30 degrees, thawing can occur during the winter some years. During the summer, hot air masses from the steppes of Kazakhstan can bring the heat to 30-35 degrees, though frost can still form on summer nights.

The highest recorded temperature in Brin-Navolok was 34.4 °C, recorded on July 13, 1972. The lowest recorded temperature was −45.2 °C, recorded on January 8, 1885.

Climate data for Brin-Navolok
Month	Jan	Feb	Mar	Apr	May	Jun	Jul	Aug	Sep	Oct	Nov	Dec	Year
Mean daily maximum °F	9.1	11.5	22.1	32.7	44.4	55	61.3	55.6	46.8	36.1	41.2	14.5	35.91
Mean daily minimum °F	2.3	4.6	15.1	25.0	36.0	45.9	52.3	48.0	41.2	32.2	18.1	7.9	27.37
Mean daily maximum °C	−12.7	−11.4	−5.5	0.4	6.9	13	16.3	13.1	8.2	2.3	5.1	−9.7	2.17
Mean daily minimum °C	−16.5	−15.2	−9.4	−3.9	2.2	7.7	11.3	8.9	5.1	0.1	−7.7	−13.4	−2.57
Average rainy days	27	24	23	18	19	18	18	20	21	26	28	29	271
Average relative humidity (%)	85	84	80	72	68	69	75	75	81	85	88	89	79

== Education ==
=== Institutions of General secondary education ===
- Brin-Navolok high school
- Brin-Navolok school

Institutions of preschool education

- Kindergarten No. 9 "Brusnichka"
- Kindergarten No. 17 "Rodnichok"

== Sister cities ==
- Trono, Sweden (27 October 2004)

== Telecommunications ==
All major Russian telecoms provide cellular coverage to the Brin-Navolok area. Rostelecom provides home television and broadband Internet. All television and radio in Brin-Navolok is broadcast digitally. The town also receives the free digital television 64, as well as three major Russian radio and three local radio stations.

== Media ==
=== Radio stations ===
- 87,9 FM the clouds
- 89.6 FM Spring FM
- 90,0 FM Sport FM
- 98.2 FM Atlantis FM
- 99,8 FM audio path
- 101.0 FM audio path
- 101.1 FM Radio Chanson
- 101,2 FM Radio Dacha
- 101.3 FM Radio station Hit FM
- 101,6 FM Radio "Arkhangelsk"
- 102,0 FM Radio "Yu-FM"
- 102.4 FM Radio Modern
- 102,8 FM — Europa Plus
- 103,4 FM — Traffic Radio
- 103.8 FM — Russian radio
- 104.1 FM — Radio station "Autoradio-Plesetsk"
- 104,2 FM Radio "NSN"
- 104,7 FM Nashe radio
- 105.1 FM Radio Dacha (Aired from Severodvinsk)
- 105,4 FM Retro FM
- 105.7 FM The Echo of Moscow Radio station "Echo of Moscow"
- 106,0 FM Radio Mayak
- 106,4 FM —Mega FM
- 107,4 FM Radio Station "State 29" " Arkhangelsk

=== Television ===
- Channel one (Russia)
- The TV Channel "Russia 1 "TV Channel "Russia-1"
- Channel "Russia-24"
- TV Channel "Euronews"
- TV Centre / ATV
- NTV
- 5 channel
- REN TV
- STS
- Star
- Match TV / Match TV
- the Disney Channel
- South
- STV

=== Printed publication ===
- Newspapers: "Pravda Severa", "Arkhangelsk", "Wave", "Mariner North", "Fisherman of the North", "Business class Arkhangelsk", "Province", "The White Sea Region Courier", "The Truth North-West", "Northern Komsomolets" (stopped in 2010), "Propaganda", "Arkhangelsk — city of military glory"
- Logs: "coastal capital", "old Arkhangelsk", Magazine, "LJ" (closed in 2009), "7 bridges", "the World through the eyes of a child", "Mood", "UD", "Health Formula", Plus, "In machine", "Los Angels"
- Pomor encyclopedia
- Newspaper "Kholmogory Life"

== Sights ==
- Monument to the fallen in the Great Patriotic War of 1941–1945 on the Northern Dvina Embankment.
- The house of Andriy Chudinov (building "Rakulskaya OOSH") is recognized as a cultural monument

== The cathedrals, Parishes and Church Brin-Navolok ==
- Chapel Of St. Nicholas The Wonderworker
- Church of the resurrection
- The Church of purification
- Antony of Siya monastery
- The Church of the GreatMartyr

== Literature ==
- "Varacheva L. V. "the Village by the Dvina".- Arkhangelsk, 2012"
