= Plesetsky District =

Plesetsky District Плесецкий район (Russian)
- District
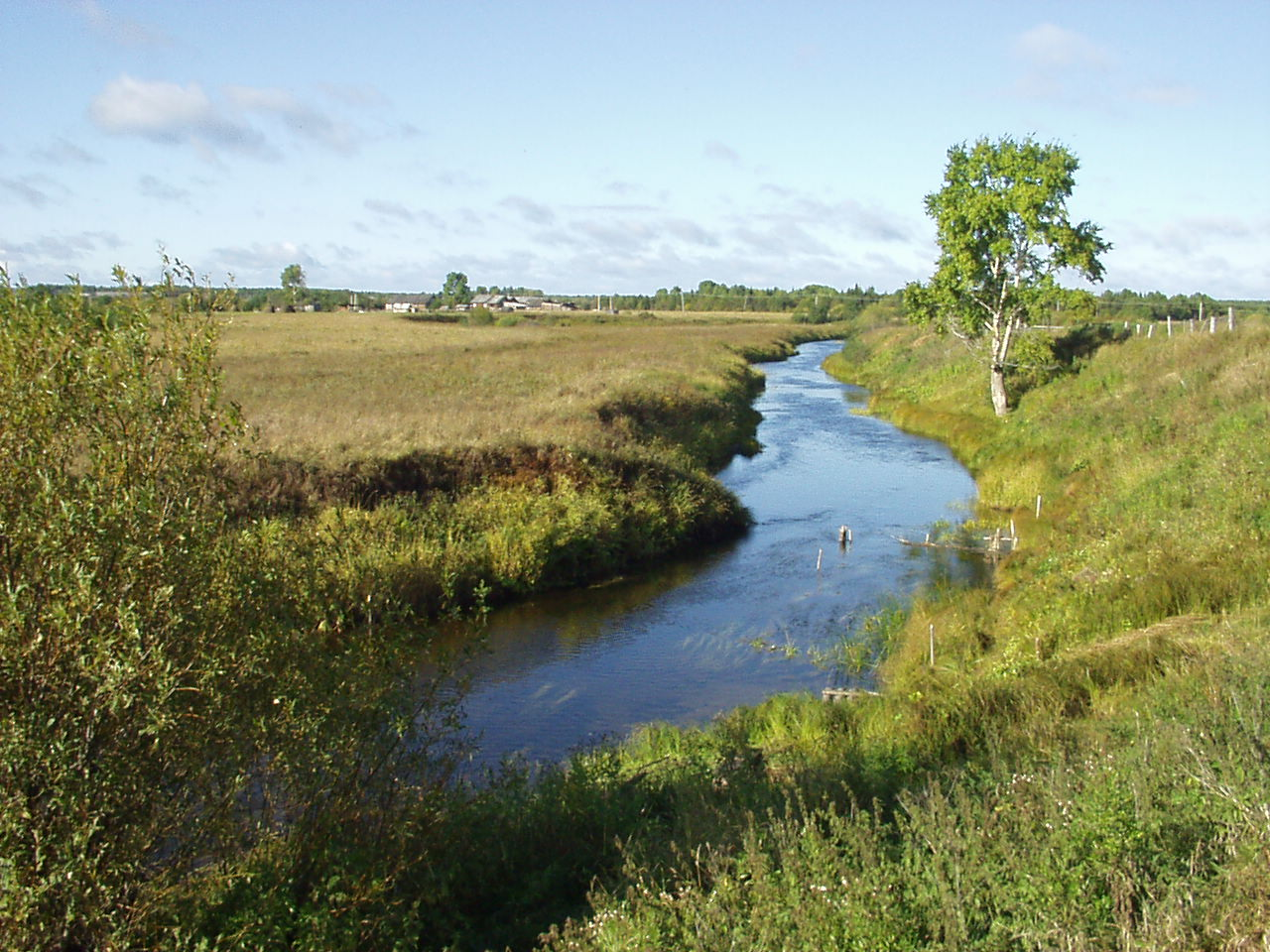
- A rural view in Plesetsky District

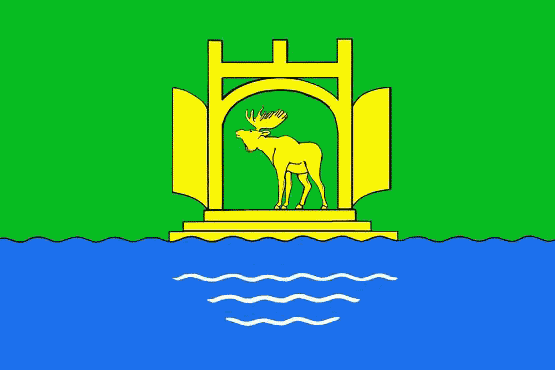
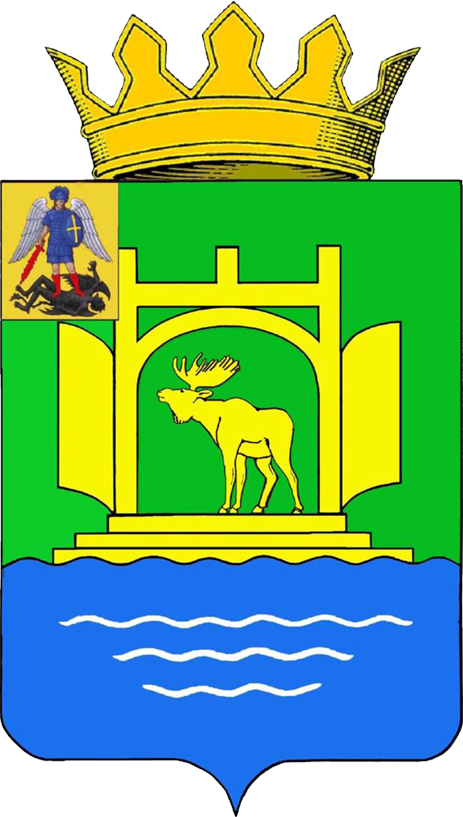
- Flag Coat of arms
- Location of Plesetsky District in Arkhangelsk Oblast
- Coordinates: 62°42′N 40°17′E
- Country: Russia
- Federal subject: Arkhangelsk Oblast
- Established: July 15, 1929
- Administrative center: Plesetsk

Area
  - Total: 27,500 km^{2} (10,600 sq mi)

Population (2010 Census)
  - Total: 49,077
  - Density: 1.78/km^{2} (4.62/sq mi)
  - Urban: 68.2%
  - Rural: 31.8%

Administrative structure
  - Administrative divisions: 4 Urban-type settlements with jurisdictional territory, 11 Selsoviets
  - Inhabited localities: 4 urban-type settlements, 235 rural localities

Municipal structure
  - Municipally incorporated as: Plesetsky Municipal District
  - Municipal divisions: 4 urban settlements, 13 rural settlements

Plesetsky District (Russian: Плесе́цкий райо́н) is an administrative district (raion) one of the twenty-one in Arkhangelsk Oblast, Russia. As a municipal division, it is incorporated as Plesetsky Municipal District. It is located in the west of the oblast and borders with Primorsky District in the north, Kholmogorsky District in the northeast, the territories of the town of oblast significance of Mirny and Vinogradovsky District in the east, Shenkursky District in the southeast, Nyandomsky and Kargopolsky Districts in the south, Pudozhsky District of the Republic of Karelia in the west, and with Onezhsky District in the northwest. The area of the district is 27,500 square kilometers (10,600 sq mi). Its administrative center is the urban locality (a work settlement) of Plesetsk. Population: 49,077 (2010 census); 58,257 (2002 census); 83,357 (1989 Soviet census). The population of Plesetsk accounts for 22.5% of the district's total population.

The Plesetsk Cosmodrome is located on the territory of the district but is administered by the federal government of Russia.

== Geography ==
The western part of the district belongs to the basin of the Onega River, which is the biggest river in the district. The Onega crosses the district from south to north, splitting it into two parts of roughly equal areas. The biggest tributaries of the Onega within the district are the Kena and the Mosha. The northeastern part of the district mostly belongs to the basin of the Yemtsa River, which is a major tributary of the Northern Dvina. Minor areas in the west of the district lie in the basin of the Vodla River across the border with the Republic of Karelia.

There are many lakes in the district, especially in the west. Two of the biggest lakes of Arkhangelsk Oblast, Lake Kenozero and Lake Undozero, both in the basin of the Kena River, are located within the district.

A major part of the district is covered by coniferous forests (taiga).

The southwestern part of the district, including Lake Kenozero, is included into Kenozersky National Park (which is split between Kargopolsky and Plesetsky Districts).

== History ==
The area was populated by speakers of Uralic languages and then colonized by the Novgorod Republic. It was located at the trading routes connecting central and northern Russia: first, from Moscow to the White Sea along the Onega River, and then, after 1765, along the newly built road between St. Petersburg and Arkhangelsk, which still exists and passes Kargopol and Plesetsk.

In the course of the administrative reform carried out in 1708 by Peter the Great, the area was divided between Ingermanland Governorate (known from 1710 as Saint Petersburg Governorate) and Archangelgorod Governorate. In the course of the consequent administrative reforms, some parts of the district were included into Kargopolsky and Pudozhsky Uyezds and were transferred in 1727 to Novgorod Governorate, ending up by 1801 in Olonets Governorate. Archangelgorod Governorate was abolished and transformed into Vologda Viceroyalty, and in 1796, Arkhangelsk Governorate was established, including Onezhsky and Arkhangelsky Uyezds. In particular, when in 1897 the railroad between Vologda and Arkhangelsk was built, Plesetskaya railway station was located in Arkhangelsky Uyezd.

During the Russian Civil War in 1918, battles were fought between the Red Army and the British troops in Plesetsk and around.

On July 15, 1929, the uyezds were abolished, the governorates merged into Northern Krai, and Plesetsky District was established among others. It became a part of Arkhangelsk Okrug of Northern Krai.

In the following years, the first-level administrative division of Russia kept changing. In 1930, the okrug was abolished, and the district was subordinated to the central administration of Northern Krai. In 1936, the krai itself was transformed into Northern Oblast. In 1937, Northern Oblast was split into Arkhangelsk Oblast and Vologda Oblast. Plesetsky District remained in Arkhangelsk Oblast ever since.

Between July 15, 1929 and January 1, 1963, Priozyorny District with the administrative center in the selo of Konyovo existed and was a part of Northern Krai, Northern Oblast, and then Arkhangelsk Oblast. In 1963, it was merged with Plesetsky District. In 1966, Mirny, at the time a work settlement, was transferred from Plesetsky District to the oblast administration.

Between July 15, 1929 and July 31, 1931, Chekuyevsky District with the administrative center in the selo of Chekuyevo existed and was a part of Northern Krai. In 1931, the district was abolished, and its area divided between Plesetsky and Onezhsky Districts.

== Divisions ==
=== Administrative divisions ===
Within the framework of administrative divisions, the district is divided into eleven selsoviets and four urban-type settlements with jurisdictional territory (Obozersky, Plesetsk, Savinsky, and Severoonezhsk). The following selsoviets have been established (the administrative centers are given in parentheses):

- Fedovsky (Fedovo)
- Kenoretsky (Karyakino)
- Kenozersky (Vershinino)
- Kholmogorsky (Lomovoye)
- Konyovsky (Konyovo)
- Krasnovsky (Kokovka)
- Pochezersky (Nizhneye Ustye)
- Sosnovsky (Letneozersky)
- Tarasovsky (Podvolochye)
- Undozersky (Undozero)
- Yarnemsky (Ulitino)

=== Municipal divisions ===
As a municipal division, the district is divided into four urban settlements and thirteen rural settlements:

| Urban settlements | Administrative center |
|---|---|
| Obozerskoye Urban Settlement (Обозерское городское поселение) | work settlement of Obozersky |
| Plesetskoye Urban Settlement (Плесецкое городское поселение) | work settlement of Plesetsk |
| Savinskoye Urban Settlement (Савинское городское поселение) | work settlement of Savinsky |
| Severoonezhskoye Urban Settlement (Североонежское городское поселение) | work settlement of Severoonezhsk |
| Rural settlements | Administrative center |
| Fedovskoye Rural Settlement (Федовское сельское поселение) | selo of Fedovo |
| Kenoretskoye Rural Settlement (Кенорецкое сельское поселение) | village of Koryakino |
| Kenozerskoye Rural Settlement (Кенозерское сельское поселение) | village of Vershinino |
| Kholmogorskoye Rural Settlement (Холмогорское сельское поселение) | settlement of Lomovoye |
| Konyovskoye Rural Settlement (Конёвское сельское поселение) | selo of Konyovo |
| Oksovskoye Rural Settlement (Оксовское сельское поселение) | settlement of Oksovsky |
| Pochezerskoye Rural Settlement (Почезерское сельское поселение) | village of Nizhneye Ustye |
| Puksoozerskoye Rural Settlement (Пуксоозерское сельское поселение) | settlement of Puksoozero |
| Samodedskoye Rural Settlement (Самодедское сельское поселение) | settlement of Samoded |
| Tarasovskoye Rural Settlement (Тарасовское сельское поселение) | village of Podvolochye |
| Undozerskoye Rural Settlement (Ундозерское сельское поселение) | settlement of Undozero |
| Yarnemskoye Rural Settlement (Ярнемское сельское поселение) | settlement of Ulitino |
| Yemtsovskoye Rural Settlement (Емцовское сельское поселение) | settlement of Yemtsa |

== Economy ==
=== Industry ===
Bauxite extraction (close to Severoonezhsk) is a developed industry in the district. The bauxites were discovered in the area in 1949, and the extraction began in 1978. A big cement plant is located in Savinsky. Timber industry is also an important branch.

=== Transportation ===
Plesetsk is located on the road connecting Kargopol with one of the principal highways in Russia, M8 between Moscow and Arkhangelsk (the highways meet in the settlement of Brin-Navolok). This is the historic trading route which connected Kargopol with Arkhangelsk before the railroad was built, and long stretches of this road are still unpaved. The stretch between Kargopol and Plesetsk was paved in 2011.

Plesetsk (Plesetskaya station) is located on the railway line between Moscow and Arkhangelsk (built in the south-north direction). In Obozersky, the line to Onega and Belomorsk branches off to the west from the main railway. From Severoonezhsk, a railway line to the west, connecting to Undozero and Yangory (an extension of the line from Puksa to Navolok) is one of the biggest railways in Russia which does not belong to Russian Railways. The owner of the railway is the State Department of Corrections. Plans to extend this line to Medvezhyegorsk have not been realized.

The Onega is not navigable within the limits of the district because of the rapids.

== Culture and recreation ==
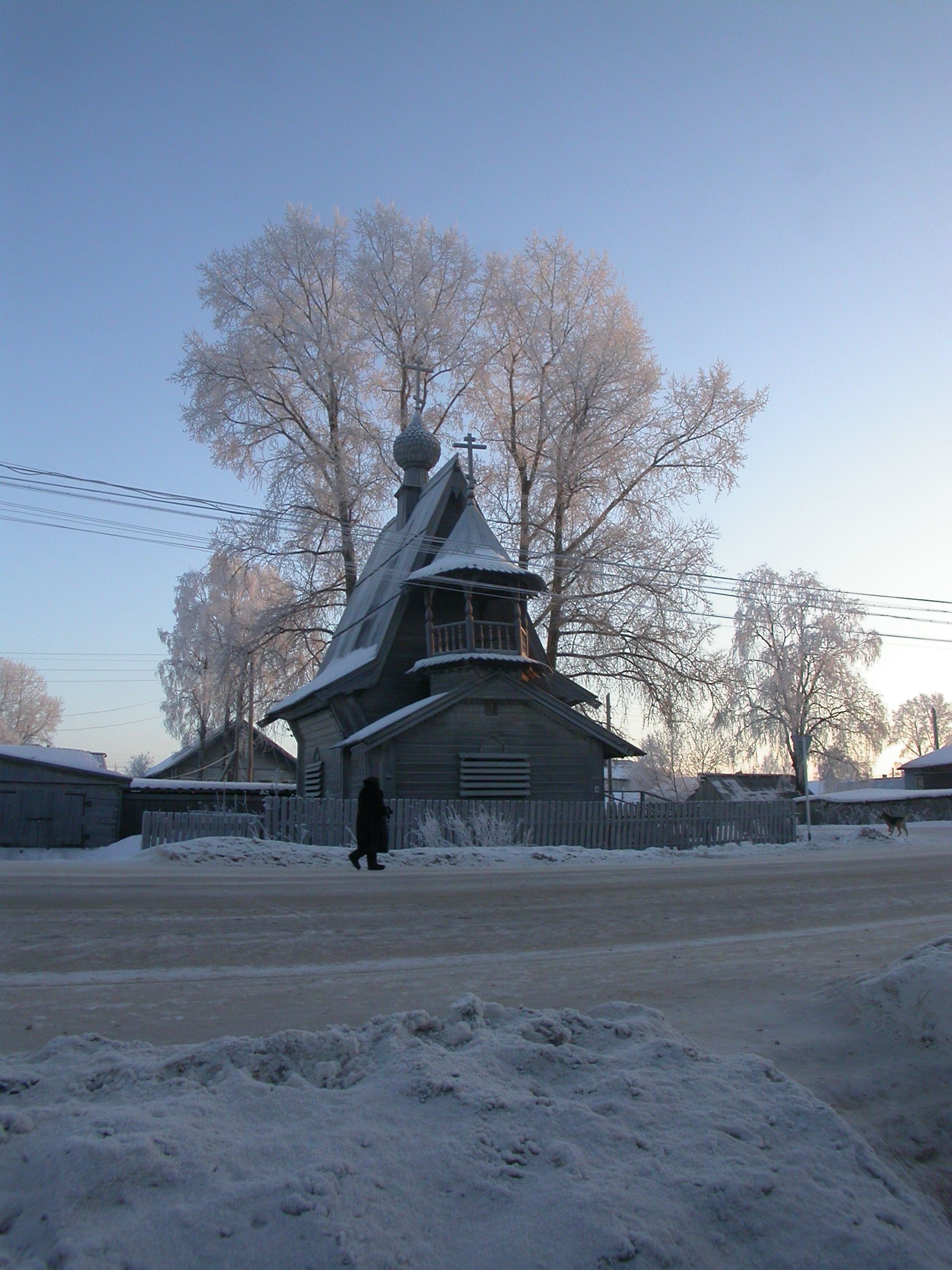
The Intercession Chapel (18th century) in the selo of Konyovo

Plesetsky District has a very high concentration of historical, archaeological, and architectural monuments. The district contains 14 objects classified as cultural and historical heritage by Russian Federal law, and additionally 110 objects classified as cultural and historical heritage of local importance. Most of these are wooden churches, chapels, farms, and also monuments to the Red Army soldiers who died in the Russian Civil War. Some of the protected wooden buildings are located in Kenozersky National Park.

The monuments classified as historical and architectural heritage are the following:

- The Porzhensky Pogost, which is the ensemble of St. George church with the bell-tower (both from 18th century) surrounded by the wooden wall with gates and towers (1789). The villages adjacent to Porzhensky Pogost have been deserted, and there is no road heading to it, so that the Pogost is only accessible via a pedestrian trail.
- The Pochozersky Pogost in the village of Filippovskaya, on Lake Pochozero. This is a triple church ensemble which consists of the big summer (cold) church of the Origin of the Wood of the Cross (1783), smaller winter (warm) church of the Translation of the Head of John the Baptist (end of 18th century), and the bell-tower; additionally there is the Chapel of Cyric and Ulita (beginning of 19th century) in the same village.
- The St. Ilia Church (1622) in Zadnyaya Dubrova
- The St. Nicholas Church in the village of Berezhnaya Dubrova
- The Intercession Chapel (18th century) in the selo of Konyovo
- The St. Iliya Church (1855) in the village of Malye Ozerki

Some of the monuments have been protected as part of the Kenozersky National Park.

The district weekly newspaper, Kuryer Prionezhya (Курьер Прионежья) has been published since 1999. The editorial office is in the settlement of Severoonezhsk.
