= Plesetsk =

Urban locality in Arkhangelsk Oblast, Russia

Plesetsk Плесецк
- Urban-type settlement
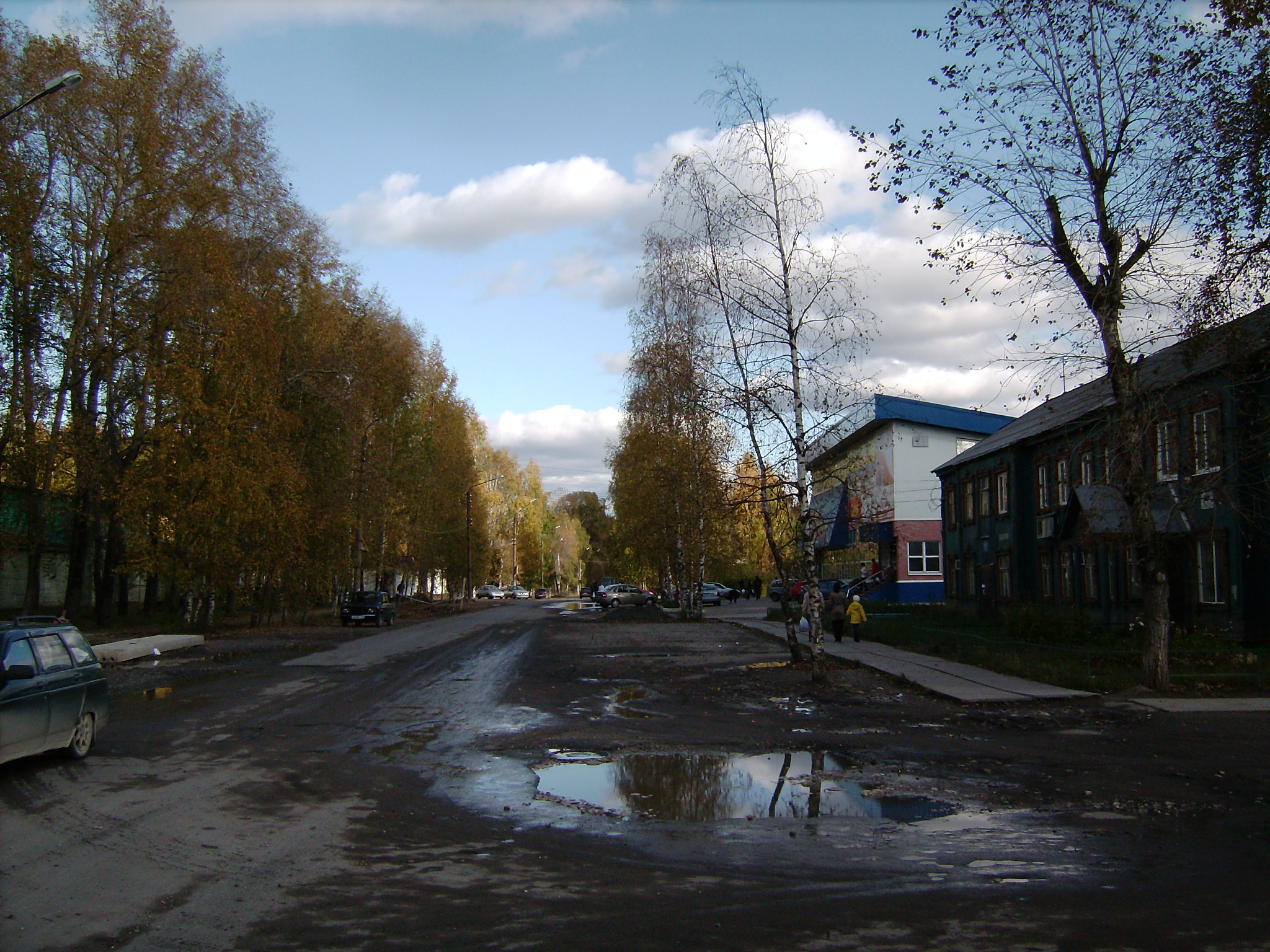
- The corner of Partizanskaya and Lenina Streets; to the right is the Administration building
- Interactive map of Plesetsk
- Location of Plesetsk Plesetsk (Arkhangelsk Oblast)
- Coordinates: 62°42′32″N 40°17′38″E
- Country: Russia
- Federal subject: Arkhangelsk Oblast
- Administrative district: Plesetsky District
- Founded: 1894

Population (2010 Census)
  - Total: 11,037
  - Estimate (2023): 8,804 (−20.2%)

Municipal status
  - Municipal district: Plesetsky Municipal District
  - Urban settlement: Plesetskoye Urban Settlement
  - Capital of: Plesetsky Municipal District, Plesetskoye Urban Settlement
- Time zone: UTC+3 (MSK)
- Postal code: 164260
- OKTMO ID: 11650151051

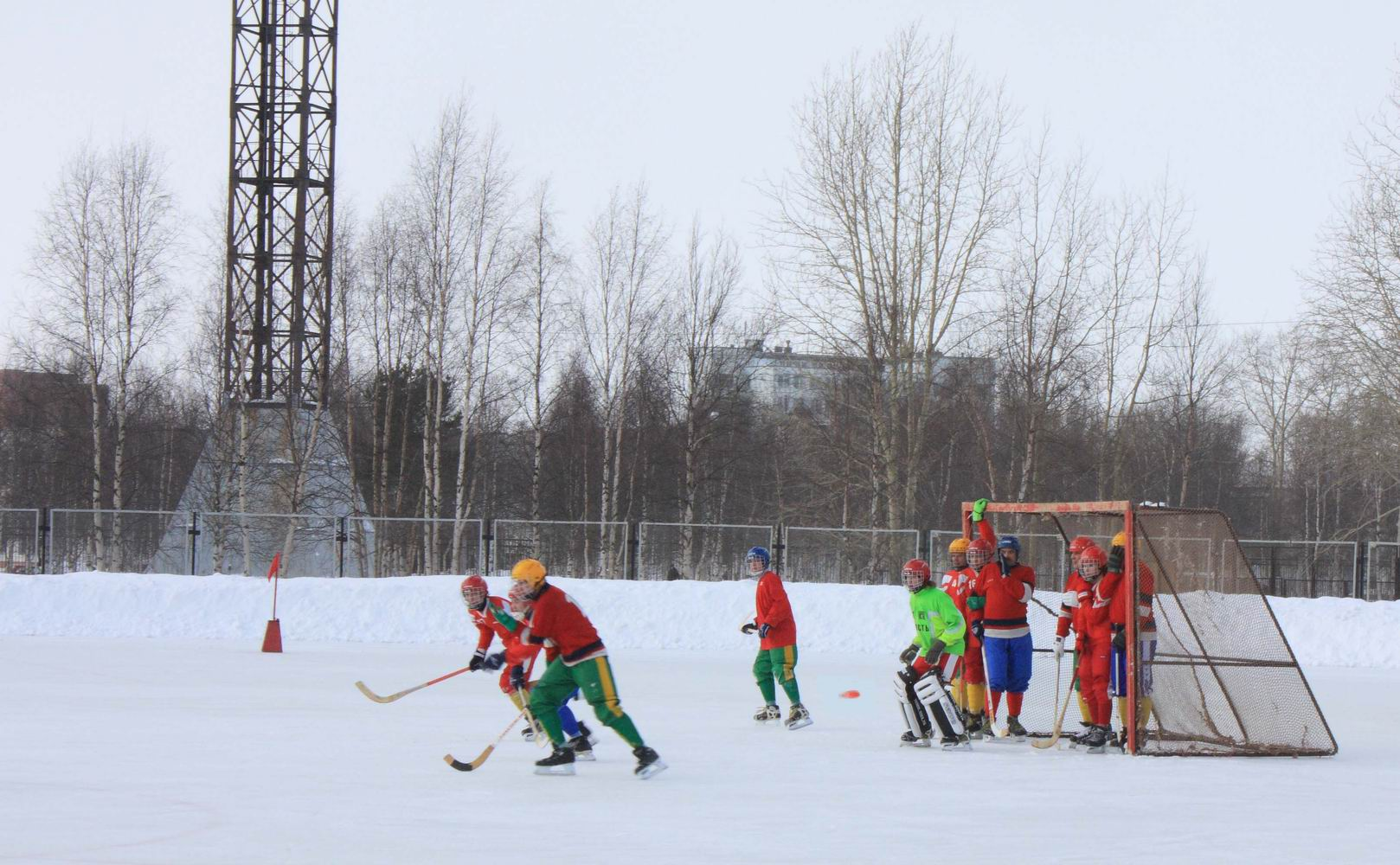
A youth team in the Bandy Championship of Arkhangelsk Oblast

Plesetsk (Russian: Плесе́цк) is an urban locality (a work settlement) and the administrative center of Plesetsky District, Arkhangelsk Oblast, Russia, situated about 800 kilometers (500 mi) northeast of Moscow and 180 kilometers (110 mi) south of Arkhangelsk. Municipally, it is the administrative center of Plesetskoye Urban Settlement, one of eight urban settlements in the district. Population: 11,037 (2010 census); 11,300 (2002 census); 14,027 (1989 Soviet census).

The vast Plesetsk Cosmodrome territory is located nearby and is administered from the town of Mirny which is 9 kilometers (5.6 mi) away from Plesetsk. The territory also includes the Plestsy Airport.

== Etymology ==
The name is derived from the word "плёс" (plyos) which means "river reach". Plestsy is the name for a small lake which Plesetsk adjoins.

== History ==
The area was populated by speakers of Uralic languages and then colonized by the Novgorod Republic. It belonged at the trading routes connecting central and northern Russia: first, from Moscow to the White Sea along the Onega River, and then, after 1765, along the newly built road between Saint-Petersburg and Arkhangelsk, which still exists and passes Kargopol and Plesetsk. However, the Plesetsk area until the 1890s was underpopulated since it was located at some distance from the main rivers of the region. From 1796, it belonged to Arkhangelsky Uyezd of Arkhangelsk Governorate. In 1894–1897, Plesetskaya railway station was built during the construction of the railroad between Vologda and Arkhangelsk. Eventually, the volost center was moved from the selo of Navolok to Plesetskaya.

During the Russian Civil War in 1918, battles were fought between the Red Army and the British troops in and around Plesetsk.

On July 15, 1929, the uyezds were abolished, the governorates merged into Northern Krai, and Plesetsky District was established among others. It became a part of Arkhangelsk Okrug of Northern Krai. In 1930, the okrug was abolished, and the district became subordinate to the central administration of Northern Krai. In 1936, the krai itself was transformed into Northern Oblast. In 1937, Northern Oblast was split into Arkhangelsk Oblast and Vologda Oblast, and Plesetsk remains the center of Plesetsky District of Arkhangelsk Oblast.

== Divisions ==
Plesetsk is divided into:

- Tsentralny
- Stary Plesetsk
- Yuzhny Mirny
- Severny Mirny
- Kosmodrom

== Sport ==
It has a youth bandy team called Yunost Pl.

== Economy ==
=== Transportation ===
Plesetsk is located on the road connecting Kargopol with one of the principal highways in Russia, M8 between Moscow and Arkhangelsk (the highways meet in the village of Brin-Navolok). This is the historic trading route which connected Kargopol with Arkhangelsk before the railroad was built, and long stretches of this road are still unpaved. The stretch between Kargopol and Plesetsk was paved in 2011.

Plesetsk (Plesetskaya railway station) is located on the Northern Railway connecting Moscow and Arkhangelsk (built in the south–north direction). From Plesetsk, a railway line to the west, connecting to Severoonezhsk, Undozero and Yangory is one of the biggest railways in Russia which does not belong to the Russian Railways. The owner of the railway is the State Department of Corrections. Plans to extend this line to Medvezhyegorsk have not been realized.

Plesetsk also serves as a transport hub to Plesetsk cosmodrome, located in the nearby town of Mirny. Plesetskaya railway station is a terminus to cosmodrome's railway system.

== Health and utilities ==
The district hospital is located in Plesetsk.
