= Dolmatovo =

Dolmatovo (Russian: Долматово) is the name of several rural localities in Russia:

- Dolmatovo, Arkhangelsk Oblast, a selo in Puysky Selsoviet of Velsky District of Arkhangelsk Oblast
- Dolmatovo, Bryansk Oblast, a village in Vysoksky Rural Administrative Okrug of Unechsky District of Bryansk Oblast; 52°44′N 32°56′E
- Dolmatovo, Ivanovo Oblast, a village in Zavolzhsky District of Ivanovo Oblast
- Dolmatovo, Kostroma Oblast, a village in Raslovskoye Settlement of Sudislavsky District of Kostroma Oblast
- Dolmatovo, Moscow Oblast, a selo under the administrative jurisdiction of Domodedovo Town Under Oblast Jurisdiction in Moscow Oblast
- Dolmatovo, Maryovsky District, Novgorod Oblast, a village in Moiseyevskoye Settlement of Maryovsky District of Novgorod Oblast
- Dolmatovo, Valdaysky District, Novgorod Oblast, a village in Lyubnitskoye Settlement of Valdaysky District of Novgorod Oblast
- Dolmatovo, Pskov Oblast, a village in Pushkinogorsky District of Pskov Oblast
- Dolmatovo, Smolensk Oblast, a village in Dolmatovskoye Rural Settlement of Tyomkinsky District of Smolensk Oblast
- Dolmatovo, Tula Oblast, a village in Dolmatovskaya Rural Administration of Chernsky District of Tula Oblast
- Dolmatovo, Kalininsky District, Tver Oblast, a village in Mikhaylovskoye Rural Settlement of Kalininsky District of Tver Oblast
- Dolmatovo, Kimrsky District, Tver Oblast, a village in Tsentralnoye Rural Settlement of Kimrsky District of Tver Oblast
- Dolmatovo, Tyumen Oblast, a village in Chelyuskinsky Rural Okrug of Kazansky District of Tyumen Oblast
- Dolmatovo, Vladimir Oblast, a village in Alexandrovsky District of Vladimir Oblast
- Dolmatovo, Kichmengsko-Gorodetsky District, Vologda Oblast, a village in Yemelyanovsky Selsoviet of Kichmengsko-Gorodetsky District of Vologda Oblast
- Dolmatovo, Vologodsky District, Vologda Oblast, a village in Vysokovsky Selsoviet of Vologodsky District of Vologda Oblast
- Dolmatovo, Yaroslavl Oblast, a village in Vasilyevsky Rural Okrug of Poshekhonsky District of Yaroslavl Oblast
