= Zaruchevsky =

Zaruchevsky (Russian: Заручевский; masculine), Zaruchevskaya (Заручевская; feminine), or Zaruchevskoye (Заручевское; neuter) is the name of several rural localities in Arkhangelsk Oblast, Russia:

- Zaruchevskaya, Konoshsky District, Arkhangelsk Oblast, a village in Tavrengsky Selsoviet of Konoshsky District
- Zaruchevskaya, Primorsky District, Arkhangelsk Oblast, a village in Koskogorsky Selsoviet of Primorsky District
- Zaruchevskaya, Ustyansky District, Arkhangelsk Oblast, a village in Rostovsky Selsoviet of Ustyansky District
- Zaruchevskaya, Velsky District, Arkhangelsk Oblast, a village in Ust-Velsky Selsoviet of Velsky District
