= Velsky =

Velsky (masculine), Velskaya (feminine), or Velskoye (neuter) may refer to:

== Places in Russia ==
- Velsky District, a district of Arkhangelsk Oblast
- Velsky Uyezd, an administrative division in the Russian Empire and the early Russian SFSR; most recently (1796–1929) a part of Vologda Governorate
- Velskoye Urban Settlement, a municipal formation which the town of Velsk and three rural localities in Velsky District of Arkhangelsk Oblast are incorporated as
- Velskaya (rural locality), a rural locality (a village) in Nyandomsky District of Arkhangelsk Oblast

== People ==
- Georgy Adelson-Velsky (b. 1922), Soviet mathematician and computer scientist
- Serafima Velskaya (1846–1933), Russian operetta artist who influenced Anastasia Vyaltseva, Russian operetta singer
