= Palkinsky (rural locality) =

Palkinsky (Russian: Палкинский; masculine), Palkinskaya (Палкинская; feminine), or Palkinskoye (Палкинское; neuter) is the name of several rural localities in Russia:

- Palkinskaya, Arkhangelsk Oblast, a village in Argunovsky Selsoviet of Velsky District of Arkhangelsk Oblast
- Palkinskaya, Kharovsky District, Vologda Oblast, a village in Razinsky Selsoviet of Kharovsky District of Vologda Oblast
- Palkinskaya, Tarnogsky District, Vologda Oblast, a village in Verkhovsky Selsoviet of Tarnogsky District of Vologda Oblast
