= Kokshenga =

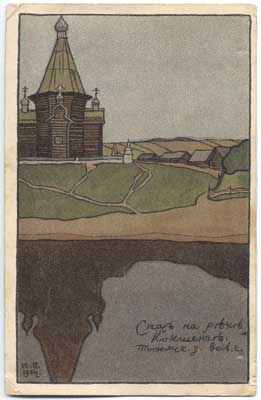
- Ivan Bilibin. Church of Christ the Saviour on Kokshenga
- Native name: Кокшеньга (Russian)

Location
- Country: Russia

Physical characteristics
- Mouth: Ustya
  - coordinates: 61°26′24″N 42°38′23″E
- Length: 251 km (156 mi)
- Basin size: 5,670 km^{2} (2,190 sq mi)
- Discharge
  - average: 35 cubic metres per second (1,200 cu ft/s)

Basin features
- Progression: Ustya→ Vaga→ Northern Dvina→ White Sea

The Kokshenga (Russian: Кокшеньга, Кокшенга) is a river in Tarnogsky District of Vologda Oblast and Ustyansky and Velsky Districts of Arkhangelsk Oblast in Russia. It is a left tributary of the Ustya and thus belongs to the Northern Dvina river basin. The length of the river is 251 kilometres (156 mi). The area of its basin 5,670 square kilometres (2,190 sq mi). Its main tributaries are the Pechenga (right) and Uftyuga (left).

The Northern Dvina River basin

The Kokshenga begins from the confluence of the Ileza (right) and the Kortyuga (left) close to the village of Ivanovskaya of Tarnogsky District. The river flows west, accepts a major tributary, the Pechenga River, from the north, and turns south-west. In the rural locality (selo) of Tarnogsky Gorodok, the district center of Tarnogsky District, it accepts the Tarnoga from the left, and sharply turns north-west. Several kilometers downstream of Tarnogsky Gorodok it accepts the Uftyuga River from the left. Downstream of Tarnogsky Gorodok, the valley of the Kokshenga is heavily populated. The river enters the Arkhangelsk Oblast, crosses the corner of the Ustyansky District, and enters the Velsky District. It then crosses the railway line connecting Konosha and Kotlas close to Kokshenga railway station. The last portion of the Kokshenga valley, downstream of the village of the village of Uzhmino, is not populated. The mouth of Kokshenga is 20 kilometres (12 mi) upstream from the mouth of the Ustya, close to the village of Mikhalyovskaya.
