= Kuloy (disambiguation) =

Kuloy may refer to several places in Russia:

- Kuloy, a town in Arkhangelsk Oblast
- Kuloy (Vaga), tributary of the Vaga in Vologda Oblast and Arkhangelsk Oblast
- Kuloy (White Sea), tributary of the White Sea in Arkhangelsk Oblast
