= Argunovsky =

Argunovsky Аргуновский
- Settlement
- Location within Arkhangelsk Oblast Location within Russia
- Coordinates: 61°04′N 42°10′E
- Country: Russia
- Region: Arkhangelsk Oblast
- District: Velsky District
- Time zone: UTC+3:00

Argunovsky (Russian: Аргуновский) is a rural locality (a settlement) and the administrative center of Argunovskoye Rural Settlement of Velsky District, Arkhangelsk Oblast, Russia. The population was 754 as of 2014. There are 16 streets.

== Geography ==
Argunovsky is located on the Vaga River, 8 km northeast of Velsk (the district's administrative centre) by road. Argunovskaya is the nearest rural locality.
