= Motylyovo =

Motylyovo Мотылёво
- Village
- Location within Arkhangelsk Oblast Location within Russia
- Coordinates: 60°48′N 40°36′E
- Country: Russia
- Region: Arkhangelsk Oblast
- District: Konoshsky District
- Time zone: UTC+3:00

Motylyovo (Russian: Мотылёво) is a rural locality (a village) in Konoshsky District, Arkhangelsk Oblast, Russia. The population was 6 as of 2010.

== Geography ==
Motylyovo is located on the Liponga River, 41 km southeast of Konosha (the district's administrative centre) by road. Kharlamovskaya is the nearest rural locality.
