= Plesovskaya =

Plesovskaya Плесовская
- Village
- Location within Arkhangelsk Oblast Location within Russia
- Coordinates: 61°03′N 42°07′E
- Country: Russia
- Region: Arkhangelsk Oblast
- District: Velsky District
- Time zone: UTC+3:00

Plesovskaya (Russian: Плесовская) is a rural locality (a village) in Velsk, Velsky District, Arkhangelsk Oblast, Russia. The population was 283 as of 2010. There is 1 street.

== Geography ==
Plesovskaya is located on the Vaga River, 2 km east of Velsk (the district's administrative centre) by road. Velsk is the nearest rural locality.
