= Melentyevsky =

Melentyevsky Мелентьевский
- Settlement
- Location within Arkhangelsk Oblast Location within Russia
- Coordinates: 61°05′N 40°16′E
- Country: Russia
- Region: Arkhangelsk Oblast
- District: Konoshsky District
- Time zone: UTC+3:00

Melentyevsky (Russian: Мелентьевский) is a rural locality (a settlement) in Konoshsky District, Arkhangelsk Oblast, Russia. The population was 418 as of 2010. There are 11 streets.

== Geography ==
Melentyevsky is located on the Konosha River, 35 km north of Konosha (the district's administrative centre) by road. Ovrazhnoye is the nearest rural locality.
