= Voskresenskoye, Arkhangelsk Oblast =

Voskresenskoye Воскресенское
- Selo
- Location within Arkhangelsk Oblast Location within Russia
- Coordinates: 61°27′N 42°30′E
- Country: Russia
- Region: Arkhangelsk Oblast
- District: Velsky District
- Time zone: UTC+3:00

Voskresenskoye (Russian: Воскресенское) is a rural locality (a selo) in Blagoveshchenskoye Rural Settlement, Velsky District, Arkhangelsk Oblast, Russia. The population was 302 as of 2014.

== Geography ==
Voskresenskoye is located 61 km north of Velsk (the district's administrative centre) by road. Zaruchevye is the nearest rural locality.
