= Begunovskaya =

Begunovskaya Бегуновская
- Village
- Location within Arkhangelsk Oblast Location within Russia
- Coordinates: 61°08′N 42°48′E
- Country: Russia
- Region: Arkhangelsk Oblast
- District: Velsky District
- Time zone: UTC+3:00

Begunovskaya (Russian: Бегуновская) is a rural locality (a village) in Rakulo-Kokshengskoye Rural Settlement of Velsky District, Arkhangelsk Oblast, Russia. The population was 8 as of 2014.

== Geography ==
Begunovskaya is located 54 km east of Velsk (the district's administrative centre) by road. Ulasovskaya is the nearest rural locality.
