= Ulasovskaya =

Ulasovskaya Уласовская
- Village
- Location within Arkhangelsk Oblast Location within Russia
- Coordinates: 61°08′N 42°48′E
- Country: Russia
- Region: Arkhangelsk Oblast
- District: Velsky District
- Time zone: UTC+3:00

Ulasovskaya (Russian: Уласовская) is a rural locality (a village) in Rakulo-Kokshengskoye Rural Settlement of Velsky District, Arkhangelsk Oblast, Russia. The population was 4 as of 2014.

== Geography ==
Ulasovskaya is located on the Kokshenga River, 55 km east of Velsk (the district's administrative centre) by road. Begunovskaya is the nearest rural locality.
