= Filyayevskaya =

Filyayevskaya Филяевская
- Village
- Location within Arkhangelsk Oblast Location within Russia
- Coordinates: 61°06′N 42°10′E
- Country: Russia
- Region: Arkhangelsk Oblast
- District: Velsky District
- Time zone: UTC+3:00

Filyayevskaya (Russian: Филяевская) is a rural locality (a village) in Muravyovskoye Rural Settlement of Velsky District, Arkhangelsk Oblast, Russia. The population was 145 as of 2014. There are 15 streets.

== Geography ==
Filyayevskaya is located 8 km northeast of Velsk (the district's administrative centre) by road. Petukhovskaya is the nearest rural locality.
