= Vel (Vaga) =

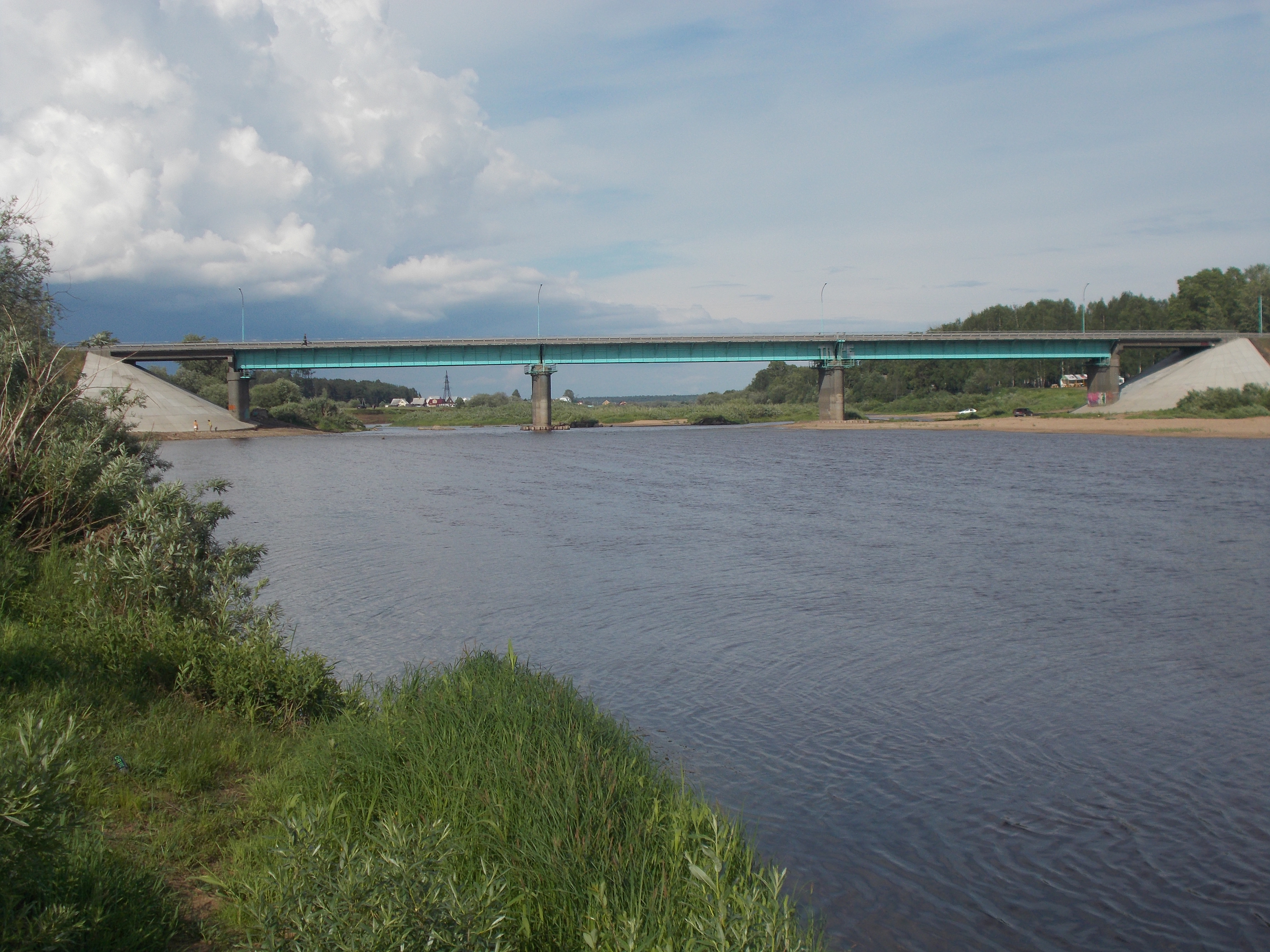
- View of the bridge across The Vel River in Velsk

Location
- Country: Arkhangelsk Oblast in Russia

Physical characteristics
- Mouth: Vaga
  - location: Velsk
  - coordinates: 61°05′11″N 42°08′41″E
- Length: 223 km (139 mi)
- Basin size: 5,390 km^{2} (2,080 sq mi)
- Discharge
  - average: 47.7 m^{3}/s (1,680 cu ft/s)

Basin features
- Progression: Vaga→ Northern Dvina→ White Sea

The Northern Dvina River basin

The Vel (Russian: Вель) is a river in Konoshsky and Velsky Districts of Arkhangelsk Oblast in Russia. It is a left tributary of the Vaga. It is 223 kilometres (139 mi) long, and the area of its basin 5,390 square kilometres (2,080 sq mi). Its average discharge (measured at the village of Balamutovskaya, about a dozen kilometers upstream from the mouth of the Vel) is 47.7 cubic metres per second (1,680 cu ft/s). Its main tributaries are the Podyuga and the Shonosha (both left).

The Vel has its sources in the bogs south of the urban-type settlement of Konosha. It flows north-east, then turns south-east, and around the village of Bolshaya Gora it accepts two right tributaries, the Votchitsa and the Tavrenga, and turns north-east. It enters Velsky District, and behind the settlement of Solginsky sharply turns north-west, until the confluence with the Podyuga. From this point, the Vel flows north, accepts the Shonosha in the selo of Ust-Shonosha, and turns east. In the selo of Shunems it turns south-east. The town of Velsk is situated at confluence of the Vel with the Vaga.

The Vel was used for timber rafting till the 1990s.
