= Pezhma (river) =

Pezhma Russian: Пежма
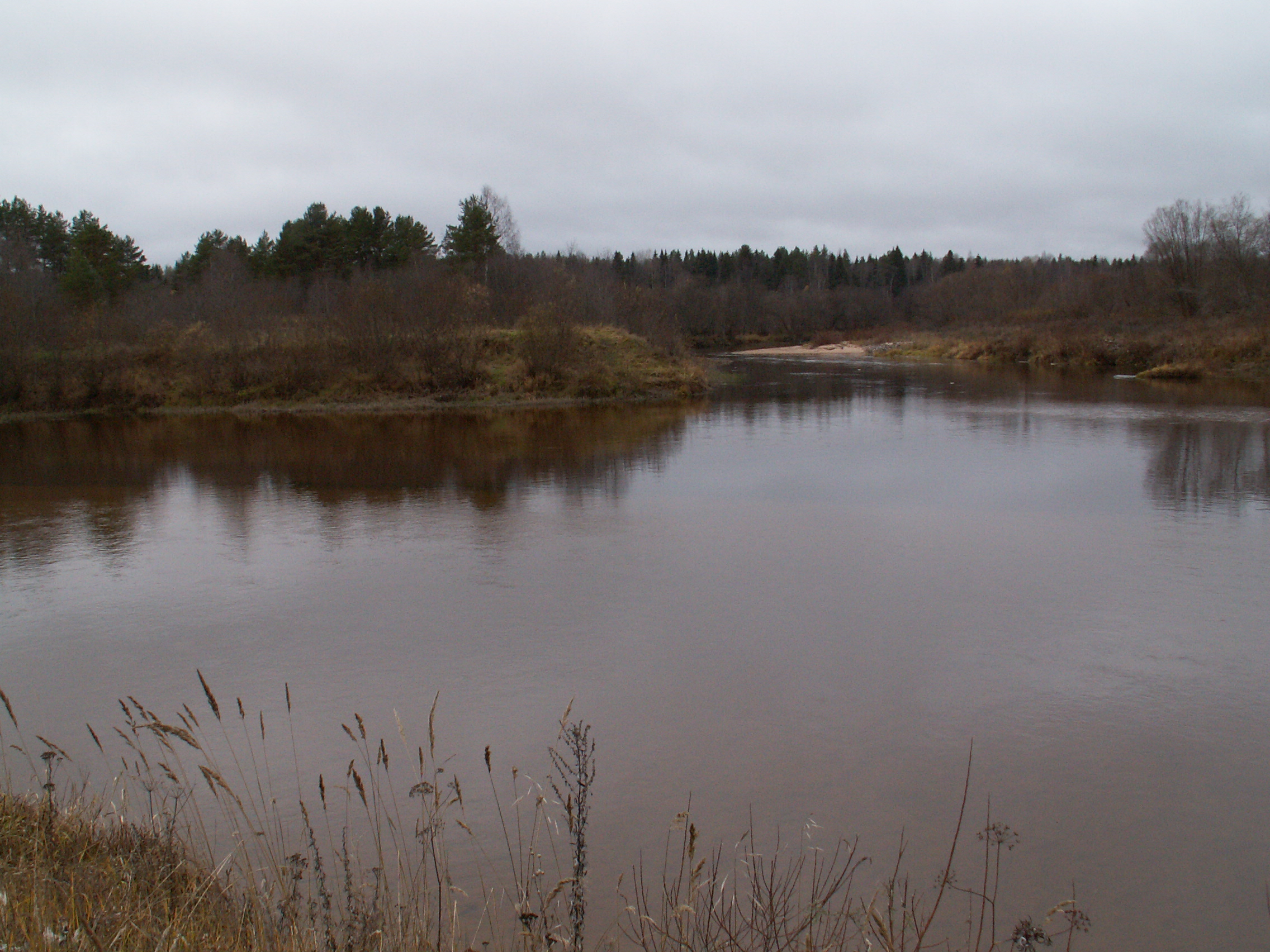

Location
- Country: Russia

Physical characteristics
- Mouth: Vaga
  - coordinates: 60°59′07″N 42°09′44″E
- Length: 137 km (85 mi)
- Basin size: 1,450 km^{2} (560 sq mi)

Basin features
- Progression: Vaga→ Northern Dvina→ White Sea

The Pezhma (Russian: Пежма) is a river in Vozhegodsky and Verkhovazhsky Districts of Vologda Oblast and in Konoshsky and Velsky Districts of Arkhangelsk Oblast in Russia. It is a left tributary of the Vaga. It is 137 kilometres (85 mi) long, and the area of its basin 1,450 square kilometres (560 sq mi). Its main tributary is the Semzhenga (left).

The source of the Pezhma is in the northern part of Vozhegodsky District. The Pezhma initially flows east, a stretch of its course forms the border between Vozhegodsky and Konoshsky districts. Eventually, it turns south-east, departures from the border, and enters Verkhovazhsky District. Downstream from the village of Nikolskaya, the valley of the Pezhma is populated. In Nikolskaya, the Peshma turns north-east. At the border between Vologda and Arkhangelsk Oblasts, the Pezhma accepts from the left its major tributary, the Semzhenga. In the village of Nikiforovo the river turns east and eventually south-east. The mouth of the Pezhma is located upstream from the town of Velsk and from the mouth of the Kuloy.

The Pezhma, as is characteristic of the rivers in the Russian North, flows in coniferous forests (taiga), and villages in the valley are grouped in the openings of the forest close to each other. These groups can be separated by relatively large stretches of the river course. Downstream from the village of Yelanskaya in Konoshsky District, the valley is open, and the river course is separated from the taiga by meadows and agricultural lands.
