= Ust-Shonosha =

Ust-Shonosha Усть-Шоноша
- Settlement
- Location within Arkhangelsk Oblast Location within Russia
- Coordinates: 61°09′N 41°19′E
- Country: Russia
- Region: Arkhangelsk Oblast
- District: Velsky District
- Time zone: UTC+3:00

Ust-Shonosha (Russian: Усть-Шоноша) is a rural locality (a settlement) and the administrative center of Ust-Shonoshskoye Rural Settlement of Velsky District, Arkhangelsk Oblast, Russia. The population was 1,125 as of 2014. There are 32 streets.

== Geography ==
Ust-Shonosha is located on the Vel River, 59 km northwest of Velsk (the district's administrative centre) by road. Ust-Shonosha is the nearest rural locality.
