= Dyukovskaya =

Dyukovskaya Дюковская
- Village
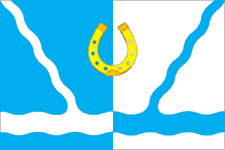
- Flag

- Location within Arkhangelsk Oblast Location within Russia
- Coordinates: 61°05′N 42°07′E
- Country: Russia
- Region: Arkhangelsk Oblast
- District: Velsky District
- Time zone: UTC+3:00

Dyukovskaya (Russian: Дюковская) is a rural locality (a village) in Velsk, Velsky District, Arkhangelsk Oblast, Russia. The population was 198 as of 2010. There are 2 streets.

== Geography ==
Dyukovskaya is located 2 km north of Velsk (the district's administrative centre) by road. Velsk is the nearest rural locality.
