= Shunema =

Shunema Шунема
- Settlement
- Location within Arkhangelsk Oblast Location within Russia
- Coordinates: 61°12′N 41°50′E
- Country: Russia
- Region: Arkhangelsk Oblast
- District: Velsky District
- Time zone: UTC+3:00

Shunema (Russian: Шунема) is a rural locality (a settlement) and the administrative center of Shadegnskoye Rural Settlement of Velsky District, Arkhangelsk Oblast, Russia. The population was 421 as of 2014. There are 11 streets.

== Geography ==
Shunema is located on the Vel River, 26 km northwest of Velsk (the district's administrative centre) by road. Titovskaya is the nearest rural locality.
