= Pritykinskaya =

Pritykinskaya Притыкинская
- Village
- Location within Arkhangelsk Oblast Location within Russia
- Coordinates: 60°56′N 41°46′E
- Country: Russia
- Region: Arkhangelsk Oblast
- District: Velsky District
- Time zone: UTC+3:00

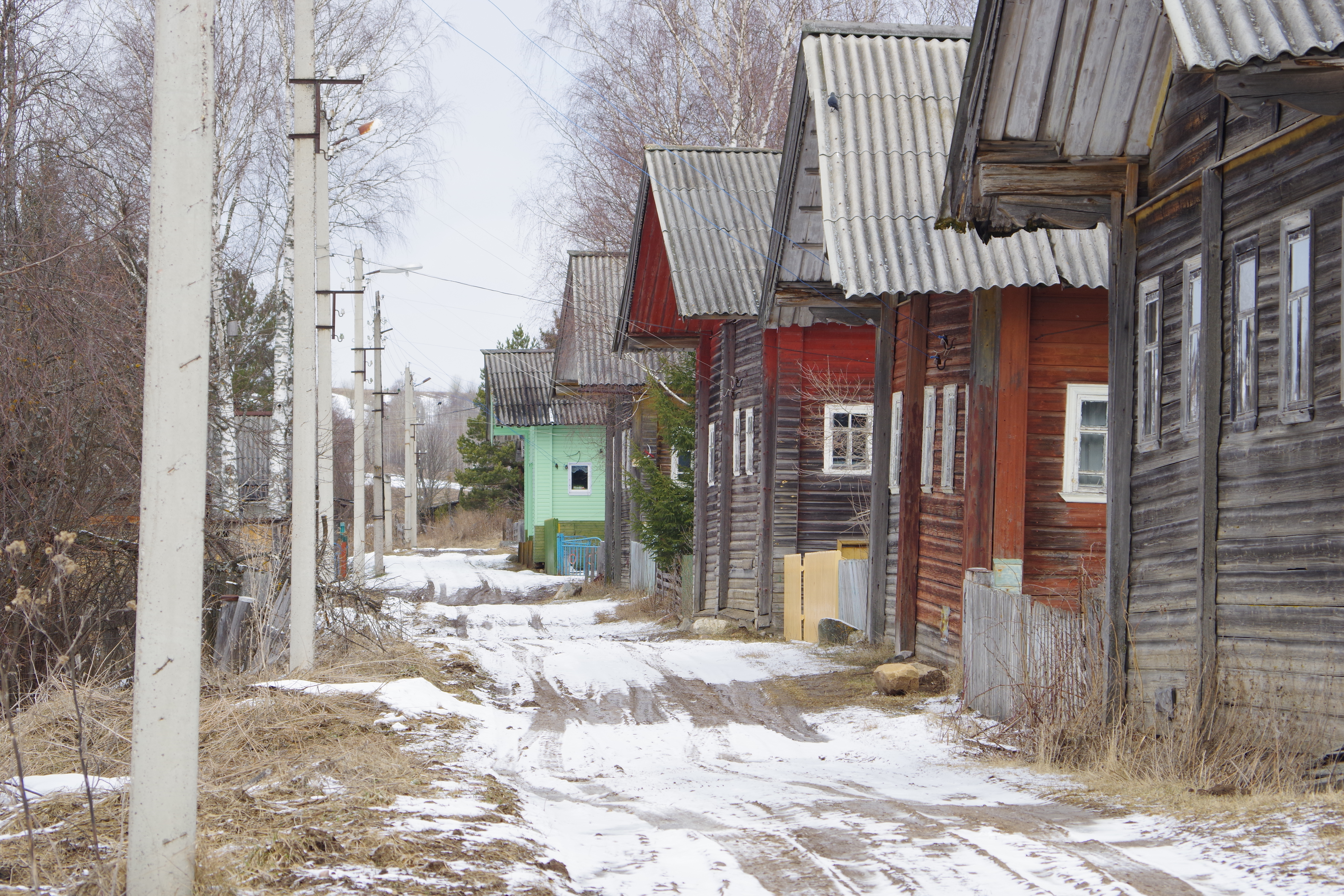
Street in Pritykinskaya (Velsky District, Arkhangelsk Oblast)

Pritykinskaya (Russian: Притыкинская) is a rural locality (a village) in Pezhemskoye Rural Settlement of Velsky District, Arkhangelsk Oblast, Russia. The population was 146 as of 2014. There are 4 streets.

== Geography ==
Pritykinskaya is located 27 km southwest of Velsk (the district's administrative centre) by road. Fedkovo is the nearest rural locality.
