= Stepankovskaya (village) =

Stepankovskaya Степанковская
- Village
- Location within Arkhangelsk Oblast Location within Russia
- Coordinates: 61°19′N 42°04′E
- Country: Russia
- Region: Arkhangelsk Oblast
- District: Velsky District
- Time zone: UTC+3:00

Stepankovskaya (Russian: Степанковская) is a rural locality (a village) in Pakshengskoye Rural Settlement of Velsky District, Arkhangelsk Oblast, Russia. The population was 81 as of 2014. There is 1 street.

== Geography ==
Stepankovskaya is located 37 km north of Velsk (the district's administrative centre) by road. Yefremkovskaya is the nearest rural locality.
