= Luchinskaya =

Luchinskaya Лучинская
- Village
- Location within Arkhangelsk Oblast Location within Russia
- Coordinates: 61°06′N 42°11′E
- Country: Russia
- Region: Arkhangelsk Oblast
- District: Velsky District
- Time zone: UTC+3:00

Luchinskaya (Russian: Лучинская) is a rural locality (a village) in Argunovskoye Rural Settlement of Velsky District, Arkhangelsk Oblast, Russia. The population was 11 as of 2014.

== Geography ==
Luchinskaya is located on the Vaga River, 10 km northeast of Velsk (the district's administrative centre) by road. Palkinskaya is the nearest rural locality.
