= Terebino =

Terebino Теребино
- Village
- Location within Arkhangelsk Oblast Location within Russia
- Coordinates: 60°51′N 42°06′E
- Country: Russia
- Region: Arkhangelsk Oblast
- District: Velsky District
- Time zone: UTC+3:00

Terebino (Russian: Теребино) is a rural locality (a village) and the administrative center of Nizovskoye Rural Settlement of Velsky District, Arkhangelsk Oblast, Russia. The population was 411 as of 2014. There are 13 streets.

== Geography ==
Terebino is located 27 km south of Velsk (the district's administrative centre) by road. Pershinskaya is the nearest rural locality.
