= Zalemenga =

Zalemenga Залеменьга
- Selo
- Location within Arkhangelsk Oblast Location within Russia
- Coordinates: 61°30′N 41°53′E
- Country: Russia
- Region: Arkhangelsk Oblast
- District: Velsky District
- Time zone: UTC+3:00

Zalemenga (Russian: Залеменьга) is a rural locality (a selo) in Lipovskoye Rural Settlement of Velsky District, Arkhangelsk Oblast, Russia. The population was 33 as of 2014. There are 3 streets.

== Geography ==
Zalemenga is located on the Puya River, 97 km north of Velsk (the district's administrative centre) by road. Malaya Lipovka is the nearest rural locality.
