= Fedkovo =

Fedkovo Федьково
- Village
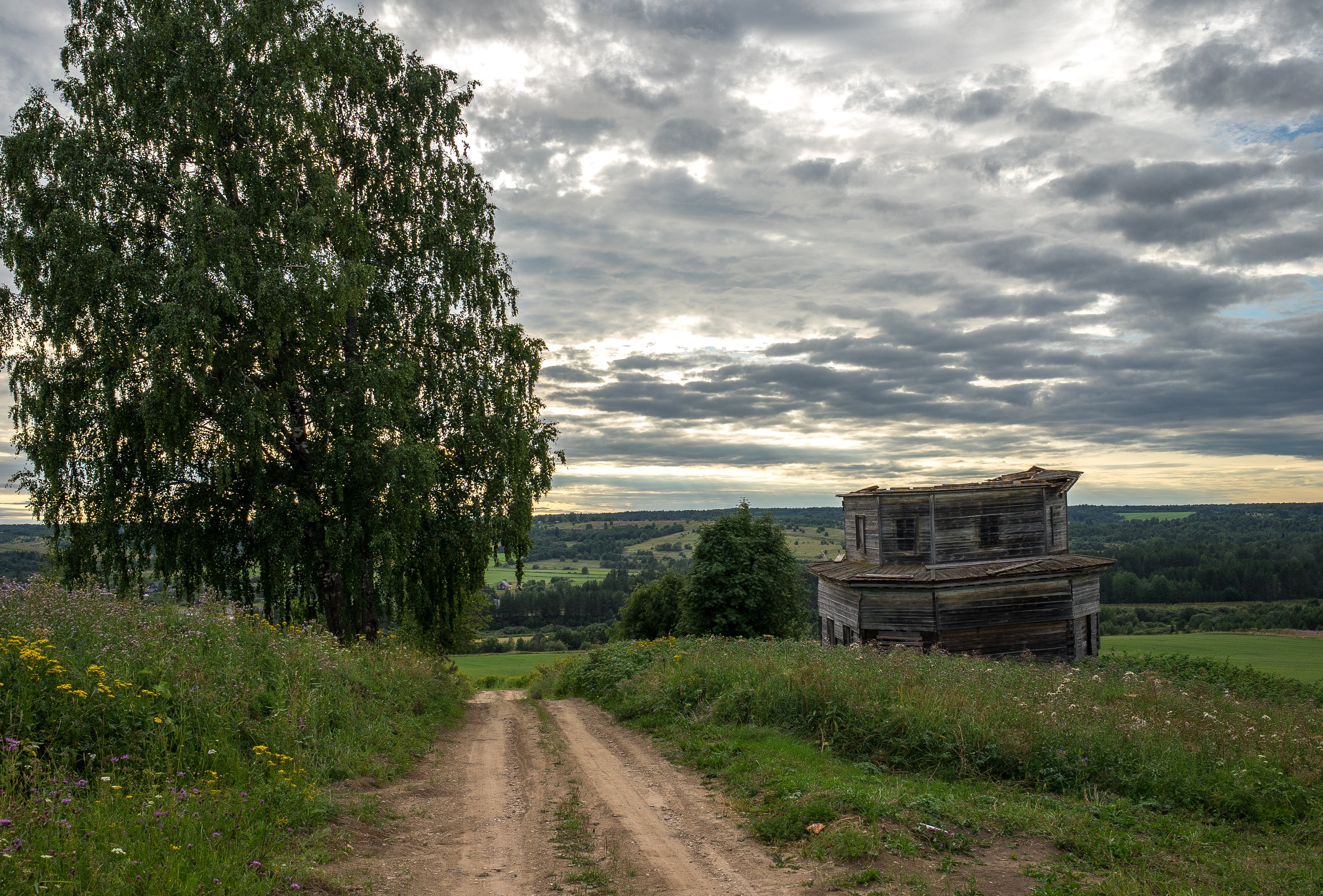

- Location within Arkhangelsk Oblast Location within Russia
- Coordinates: 60°56′N 41°48′E
- Country: Russia
- Region: Arkhangelsk Oblast
- District: Velsky District
- Time zone: UTC+3:00

Fedkovo (Russian: Федьково) is a rural locality (a village) in Pezhemskoye Rural Settlement of Velsky District, Arkhangelsk Oblast, Russia. The population was 7 as of 2014.

== Geography ==
Fedkovo is located 28 km southwest of Velsk (the district's administrative centre) by road. Pritykinskaya is the nearest rural locality.
