= Tyogro-Ozero =

Tyogro-Ozero Тёгро-Озеро
- Settlement
- Location within Arkhangelsk Oblast Location within Russia
- Coordinates: 61°39′N 41°31′E
- Country: Russia
- Region: Arkhangelsk Oblast
- District: Velsky District
- Time zone: UTC+3:00

Tyogro-Ozero (Russian: Тёгро-Озеро) is a rural locality (a settlement) in Velsky District, Arkhangelsk Oblast, Russia. The population was 1,526 as of 2010. There are 9 streets.

== Geography ==
Tyogro-Ozero is located 140 km northwest of Velsk (the district's administrative centre) by road. Verkhopuysky is the nearest rural locality.
