= Rystseva Gorka =

Rystseva Gorka Рысцева Горка
- Village
- Location within Arkhangelsk Oblast Location within Russia
- Coordinates: 61°11′N 42°46′E
- Country: Russia
- Region: Arkhangelsk Oblast
- District: Velsky District
- Time zone: UTC+3:00

Rystseva Gorka (Russian: Рысцева Горка) is a rural locality (a village) in Rakulo-Kokshengskoye Rural Settlement of Velsky District, Arkhangelsk Oblast, Russia. The population was 2 as of 2014.

== Geography ==
Rystseva Gorka is located on the Kokshenga River, 62 km northeast of Velsk (the district's administrative centre) by road. Pugachyovskaya is the nearest rural locality.
