= Lukinskaya =

Lukinskaya Лукинская
- Village
- Location within Arkhangelsk Oblast Location within Russia
- Coordinates: 61°05′N 42°05′E
- Country: Russia
- Region: Arkhangelsk Oblast
- District: Velsky District
- Time zone: UTC+3:00

Lukinskaya (Russian: Лукинская) is a rural locality (a village) in Muravyovskoye Rural Settlement of Velsky District, Arkhangelsk Oblast, Russia. The population was 1,062 as of 2014. There are 12 streets.

== Geography ==
Lukinskaya is located on the Vaga River, 3 km north of Velsk (the district's administrative centre) by road. Voronovskaya is the nearest rural locality.
