= Meledinskaya =

Meledinskaya Мелединская
- Village
- Location within Arkhangelsk Oblast Location within Russia
- Coordinates: 60°58′N 42°26′E
- Country: Russia
- Region: Arkhangelsk Oblast
- District: Velsky District
- Time zone: UTC+3:00

Meledinskaya (Russian: Мелединская) is a rural locality (a village) and the administrative center of Verkhneustkuloyskoye Rural Settlement, Velsky District, Arkhangelsk Oblast, Russia. The population was 296 as of 2010.

== Geography ==
Meledinskaya is located 27 km southeast of Velsk (the district's administrative centre) by road. Makoveyevo is the nearest rural locality.
