= Pugachyovsky =

Pugachyovsky/Pugachevsky (masculine), Pugachyovskaya/Pugachevskaya, or Pugachyovskoye/Pugachevskoye may refer to:

- Pugachyovsky District, a district of Saratov Oblast, Russia
- Pugachevsky (rural locality) (Pugachevskaya, Pugachevskoye), name of several rural localities in Russia
