= Ponomaryovskaya, Konoshsky District, Arkhangelsk Oblast =

Ponomaryovskaya Пономарёвская
- Village
- Location within Arkhangelsk Oblast Location within Russia
- Coordinates: 60°49′N 40°58′E
- Country: Russia
- Region: Arkhangelsk Oblast
- District: Konoshsky District
- Time zone: UTC+3:00

Ponomaryovskaya (Russian: Пономарёвская) is a rural locality (a village) in the administrative center of Tavrengskoye Rural Settlement, Konoshsky District, Arkhangelsk Oblast, Russia. As of 2010, the population in Ponomaryovskaya was 368. There are 9 streets in the locality of Ponomaryovskaya.

== Geography ==
Ponomaryovskaya is located 48 km southeast of Konosha (the district's administrative centre) by road. Pogarinskaya is the nearest rural locality.
