= Voloshka =

Voloshka Волошка
- Settlement
- Location within Arkhangelsk Oblast Location within Russia
- Coordinates: 61°19′N 40°05′E
- Country: Russia
- Region: Arkhangelsk Oblast
- District: Konoshsky District
- Time zone: UTC+3:00

Voloshka (Russian: Волошка) is a rural locality (a settlement) in Konoshsky District, Arkhangelsk Oblast, Russia. The population was 902 as of 2010. There are 29 streets.

== Geography ==
Voloshka is located on the Voloshka River, 67 km north of Konosha (the district's administrative centre) by road.
