= Palkinsky =

Palkinsky (masculine), Palkinskaya (feminine), or Palkinskoye (neuter) may refer to:

- Palkinsky District, a district of Leningrad Oblast
- Palkinsky (rural locality) (Palkinskaya, Palkinskoye), name of several rural localities in Russia
