= Pugachevskaya, Arkhangelsk Oblast =

Pugachevskaya Пугачёвская
- Village
- Location within Arkhangelsk Oblast Location within Russia
- Coordinates: 61°10′N 42°47′E
- Country: Russia
- Region: Arkhangelsk Oblast
- District: Velsky District
- Time zone: UTC+3:00

Pugachevskaya (Russian: Пугачёвская) is a rural locality (a village) in Rakulo-Kokshengskoye Rural Settlement of Velsky District, Arkhangelsk Oblast, Russia. The population was 7 as of 2014.

== Geography ==
Pugachevskaya is located 59 km northeast of Velsk (the district's administrative centre) by road. Rystseva Gorka is the nearest rural locality.
