= Yershovsky =

Yershovsky (masculine), Yershovskaya (feminine), or Yershovskoye (neuter) may refer to:

- Yershovsky District, a district of Saratov Oblast, Russia
- Yershovsky (inhabited locality) (Yershovskaya, Yershovskoye), several rural localities in Russia
