= Ponomaryovsky (rural locality) =

Ponomaryovsky (Russian: Пономарёвский; masculine), Ponomaryovskaya (Пономарёвская; feminine), or Ponomaryovskoye (Пономарёвское; neuter) is the name of several rural localities (villages) in Russia:

- Ponomaryovskoye, a village in Orekhovskoye Settlement of Galichsky District of Kostroma Oblast
- Ponomaryovskaya, Konoshsky District, Arkhangelsk Oblast, a village in Tavrengsky Selsoviet of Konoshsky District of Arkhangelsk Oblast
- Ponomaryovskaya, Krasnoborsky District, Arkhangelsk Oblast, a village in Cherevkovsky Selsoviet of Krasnoborsky District of Arkhangelsk Oblast
