= Kizema =

Kizema Кизема
- Settlement
- Location within Arkhangelsk Oblast Location within Russia
- Coordinates: 61°07′N 44°49′E
- Country: Russia
- Region: Arkhangelsk Oblast
- District: Ustyansky District
- Elevation: 122 m (400 ft)

Population (2012)
  - Total: 3,644
- Time zone: MSK(UTC+3)
- Postal code: 165262
- Area code: (+7)81855
- Vehicle registration: 29

Kizema (Russian: Кизема) is a rural locality (a settlement) in Ustyansky District, Arkhangelsk Oblast, Russia, about 700 km northeast of Moscow. The population was 2,968 as of 2010. There are 50 streets.

== Geography ==
Kizema is located on the Kizema River, about 440 km southwest of the oblast capital Arkhangelsk. The nearest cities are Kotlas, 100 km to the west; and Velsk, 100 km to the east. The land around it is very flat, and covered with forest. Being close to the Arctic, the climate here is boreal. The average temperature is -1 °C, with the warmest at 17 °C in July, and the coldest at -18 °C in January. Due to the cold climate, population density here is very small, at only about 2 people per square kilometer.

== History ==
Kizema was named after the nearby Kizema river, which is a tributary of Utsya. Kizema is from the Sami word for summer.

Kizema was established in 1942 as a railway station for Pechora railway, built by prisoners from the surrounding Gulag labor camps. Since 1947 there was a timber factory in the village. The Kizema settlement council was formed in 1951. In order to develop the forestry of the surrounding areas, the Kizema Narrow-gauge railway was built, which runs south from Kizema. In September of 1959, the village of Kizema was transferred to the Utsyansky district of the Cherevkovsky oblast. Until 2005, Kizema was an urban-type settlement.

== Demography ==
The following table shows the historical population of Kizema:

Year	Population
1959	11,264
1970	4,962
1979	4,921
1989	5,181
2002	3,788
2010	2,968

The municipality of Kizema include the towns of Vonzhuga and Sengoss, and has 3644 inhabitants as of 2012.

== Culture ==
For a short time, the Russian poet and actor Yuri Vizbor worked as a teacher here after graduation in the 1950s. Till these days Kizema has traditions dedicated to the memory of Yuri Vizbor.

== Industry ==
Kizame is a railway station on the Konosha-Kotlas line of the Pechora Railway. The most important economic sectors of Kizema are the lumber industry and railway transport. The town has a cultural center, two schools, a kindergarten, two libraries and a hospital.
