= Dolmatovo, Arkhangelsk Oblast =

Dolmatovo Долматово
- Selo
- Location within Arkhangelsk Oblast Location within Russia
- Coordinates: 61°32′N 42°20′E
- Country: Russia
- Region: Arkhangelsk Oblast
- District: Velsky District
- Time zone: UTC+3:00

Dolmatovo (Russian: Долматово) is a rural locality (a selo) in Velsky District, Arkhangelsk Oblast, Russia. The population was 832 as of 2010. There are 21 streets.

== Geography ==
Dolmatovo is located 70 km north of Velsk (the district's administrative centre) by road. Vaskovo is the nearest rural locality.
