= Ponomaryovsky =

Ponomaryovsky (masculine), Ponomaryovskaya (feminine), or Ponomaryovskoye (neuter) may refer to:

- Ponomaryovsky District, a district of Orenburg Oblast, Russia
- Ponomaryovsky (rural locality) (Ponomaryovskaya, Ponomaryovskoye), name of several rural localities in Russia
