= Ustyansky District =

Ustyansky District Устьянский район (Russian)
- District
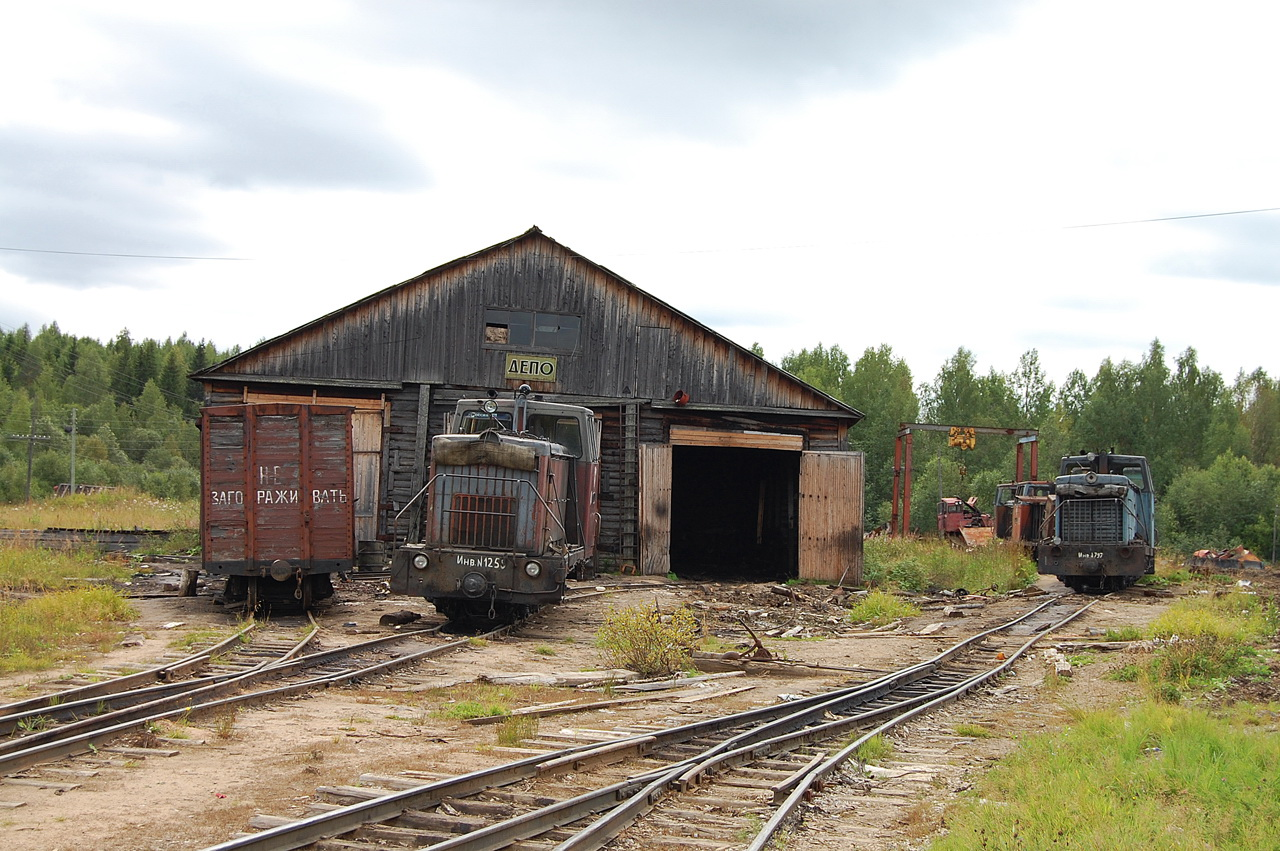
- Loyginskaya railway, Ustyansky District

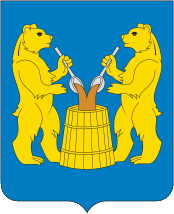
- Flag Coat of arms
- Location of Ustyansky District in Arkhangelsk Oblast
- Coordinates: 61°05′N 43°09′E
- Country: Russia
- Federal subject: Arkhangelsk Oblast
- Established: July 15, 1929
- Administrative center: Oktyabrsky

Area
  - Total: 10,700 km^{2} (4,100 sq mi)

Population (2010 Census)
  - Total: 30,581
  - Density: 2.86/km^{2} (7.40/sq mi)
  - Urban: 30.4%
  - Rural: 69.6%

Administrative structure
  - Administrative divisions: 1 Urban-type settlements with jurisdictional territory, 17 Selsoviets
  - Inhabited localities: 1 urban-type settlements, 232 rural localities

Municipal structure
  - Municipally incorporated as: Ustyansky Municipal District
  - Municipal divisions: 1 urban settlements, 15 rural settlements
- Time zone: UTC+3 (MSK)
- OKTMO ID: 11654000
- Website: http://www.ustyany.net/

Ustyansky District (Russian: Устья́нский райо́н) is an administrative district (raion), one of the twenty-one in Arkhangelsk Oblast, Russia. As a municipal division, it is incorporated as Ustyansky Municipal District. It is located in the south of the oblast and borders with Verkhnetoyemsky District in the northeast, Krasnoborsky and Kotlassky Districts in the east, Velikoustyugsky, Nyuksensky, Tarnogsky, and Verkhovazhsky Districts, all of Vologda Oblast, in the south, Velsky District in the west, and with Shenkursky District in the northwest. The area of the district is 10,700 square kilometers (4,100 sq mi). Its administrative center is the urban locality (an urban-type settlement) of Oktyabrsky. Population: 30,581 (2010 census); 37,131 (2002 census); 45,352 (1989 Soviet census). The population of Oktyabrsky accounts for 30.4% of the district's total population.

== Etymology ==
The name of the district originates from the Ustya River.

== Geography ==
The district is located on the left bank of the Northern Dvina River. Most of the district's territory belongs to the basin of the Ustya River and its tributaries. The main tributaries of the Ustya are the Kizema (left), the Obil (right), and the Kokshenga (left).

Minor parts of the district in the east and in the north belong to the basins of some of the tributaries of the Northern Dvina, such as the Yumizh and the Ludonga, and drain to the northeast.

Most of the district is covered by coniferous forests (taiga).

== History ==
The area was populated by speakers of Uralic languages and then colonized by the Novgorod Republic. After the fall of Novgorod, the area became a part of the Grand Duchy of Moscow. Historically, it was a part of Vazhsky Uyezd, a vast area including almost all of the basin of the Vaga River. In the course of the administrative reform carried out in 1708 by Peter the Great, the area was included into Archangelgorod Governorate. In 1780, the governorate was abolished and transformed into Vologda Viceroyalty. Vazhsky Uyezd was split, and the area of the current Ustyansky District became a part of the newly established Velsky Uyezd. In 1796, Velsky Uyezd was transferred to Vologda Governorate and remained there until 1929, when several governorates were merged into Northern Krai. On July 15, 1929, the uyezds were abolished, and Velsky Uyezd was split into Velsky, Verkhovazhsky, and Ustyansky Districts. The administrative center of Ustyansky district became the selo of Shangaly. Ustyansky District became a part of Nyandoma Okrug of Northern Krai.

In the following years, the first-level administrative division of Russia kept changing. In 1930, the okrug was abolished, and the district was subordinated to the central administration of Northern Krai. In 1936, the krai itself was transformed into Northern Oblast. In 1937, Northern Oblast was split into Arkhangelsk Oblast and Vologda Oblast. Ustyansky District remained in Arkhangelsk Oblast ever since.

On September 26, 1975, the administrative center of the district was transferred from Shangaly to Oktyabrsky, but it took some time before all of the district services were moved.

From 1924 to 1959, Cherevkovsky District existed, with the administrative center in the selo of Cherevkovo, initially in Northern Dvina Governorate. On September 11, 1959, the district was abolished and split between Krasnoborsky, Verkhnetoyemsky, and Ustyansky Districts; the administrative center Cherevkovo became a part of Krasnoborsky District.

== Divisions ==
=== Administrative divisions ===
As an administrative division, the district is divided into seventeen selsoviets and one urban-type settlement with jurisdictional territory (Oktyabrsky). Three localities which previously had urban-type settlement status were downgraded to rural status. These are Ileza (downgraded in 2004), Kizema (2005), and Loyga (2005). The following selsoviets have been established (the administrative centers are given in parentheses):

- Bereznitsky (Bereznik);
- Bestuzhevsky (Bestuzhevo);
- Chadromsky (Chadroma);
- Cherenovsky (Kadyyevskaya);
- Dmitriyevsky (Alfyorovskaya);
- Ilezsky (Ileza);
- Kizemsky (Kizema);
- Likhachyovsky (Mirny);
- Loyginsky (Loyga);
- Malodorsky (Malodory);
- Minsky (Filinskaya);
- Orlovsky (Dubrovskaya);
- Rostovsky (Ulyanovskaya);
- Plossky (Levoplosskaya);
- Shangalsky (Shangaly);
- Sinitsky (Sinniki);
- Stroyevskoy (Stroyevskoye).

=== Municipal divisions ===
As a municipal division, the district is divided into one urban settlement and fifteen rural settlements (the administrative centers are given in parentheses):

- Oktyabrskoye Urban Settlement (Oktyabrsky);
- Bereznitskoye Rural Settlement (Bereznik);
- Bestuzhevskoye Rural Settlement (Bestuzhevo);
- Cherenovskoye Rural Settlement (Kadyevskaya);
- Dmitriyevskoye Rural Settlement (Alfyorovskaya);
- Ilezskoye Rural Settlement (Ileza);
- Kizemskoye Rural Settlement (Kizema);
- Likhachyovskoye Rural Settlement (Mirny);
- Loyginskoye Rural Settlement (Loyga);
- Malodorskoye Rural Settlement (Malodory);
- Orlovskoye Rural Settlement (Dubrovskaya);
- Plosskoye Rural Settlement (Levoplosskaya);
- Rostovsko-Minskoye Rural Settlement (Ulyanovskaya);
- Shangalskoye Rural Settlement (Shangaly);
- Sinitskoye Rural Settlement (Kidyuga);
- Stroyevskoye Rural Settlement (Stroyevskoye).

== Economy ==
=== Industry ===
The basis of the economy of the district is timber industry. The Ustya River was used for timber rafting until the 1990s.

=== Agriculture ===
Ustyansky District is marketed as a regional center of beekeeping, and Oktyabrsky holds a yearly honey festival Medovy Spas.

=== Transportation ===
Paved roads connect Oktyabrsky with Velsk in the west and with Totma and Veliky Ustyug via Tarnogsky Gorodok in the south. There are also local roads in the district; one of which connects Oktyabrsky with the selo of Bestuzhevo in the north of the district.

A section of the railroad connecting Konosha and Kotlas, which eventually continues to Vorkuta, lies in the district. The principal station in the limits of the district is Kostylevo, several kilometers from Oktyabrsky.

== Culture and recreation ==
The district previously had one object classified as cultural and historical heritage by Russian Federal law. This is the wooden Church of the Nativity of the Theotokos (18th century) in the selo of Bestuzhevo, which was neglected and eventually burned down in 1994. Additionally, eleven architectural monuments and ten archaeological monuments have been designated as cultural heritage monuments of local importance.

The only museum in the district is the Ustyansky District Museum, which was opened in 1984 in Shangaly and moved to Oktyabrsky in 1987.

== Notable people ==
Notable people born in the district include the participants of World War II Roza Shanina and Aleksandr Yedemsky.
