= Sulanda =

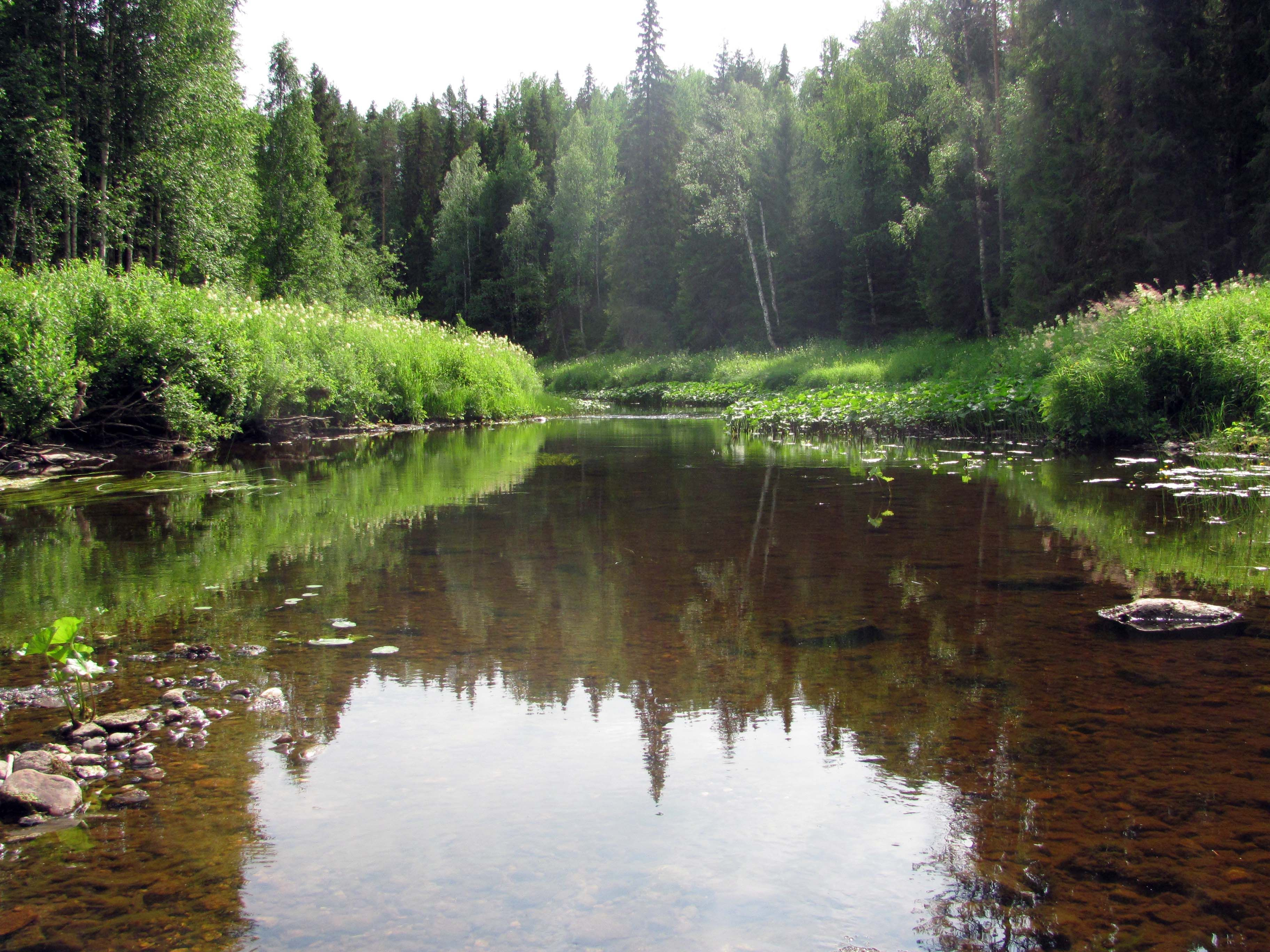

Location
- Country: Russia

Physical characteristics
- Mouth: Puya
  - coordinates: 61°41′43″N 42°28′58″E
- Length: 126 km (78 mi)
- Basin size: 1,160 km^{2} (450 sq mi)

Basin features
- Progression: Puya→ Vaga→ Northern Dvina→ White Sea

The Sulanda (Russian: Суланда is a river in Arkhangelsk Oblast, Russia, a left tributary of the Puya. Its length is 126-kilometer (78 mi), and its basin area is 1,160 square kilometers (450 sq mi).
