= Solginsky =

Solginsky Солгинский
- Settlement
- Location within Arkhangelsk Oblast Location within Russia
- Coordinates: 61°03′N 41°20′E
- Country: Russia
- Region: Arkhangelsk Oblast
- District: Velsky District
- Time zone: UTC+3:00

Solginsky (Russian: Солгинский) is a rural locality (a settlement) in Velsky District, Arkhangelsk Oblast, Russia. The population was 1,526 as of 2010. There are 28 streets.

== Geography ==
Solginsky is located 53 km west from Velsk (the district's administrative centre) by road, on the Vel River. Yakushevskaya is the nearest rural locality.
