= Pugachevsky (rural locality) =

Pugachevsky/Pugachyovsky (Russian: Пугачевский; masculine), Pugachevskaya/Pugachyovskaya (Пугачевская; feminine), or Pugachevskoye/Pugachyovskoye (Пугачевское; neuter) is the name of several rural localities in Russia:

- Pugachevsky, Chelyabinsk Oblast, a settlement in Sarafanovsky Selsoviet of Chebarkulsky District in Chelyabinsk Oblast
- Pugachevsky, Orenburg Oblast, a settlement in Pugachevsky Selsoviet of Orenburgsky District in Orenburg Oblast
- Pugachevsky, Saratov Oblast, a settlement in Pugachyovsky District of Saratov Oblast
- Pugachevskaya, Arkhangelsk Oblast, a village in Rakulo-Kokshengsky Selsoviet of Velsky District in Arkhangelsk Oblast
- Pugachevskaya, Volgograd Oblast, a stanitsa in Pugachevsky Selsoviet of Kotelnikovsky District in Volgograd Oblast

== See also ==
- Pugachyov, a town in Saratov Oblast, Russia
