= Shangaly =

Shangaly (Russian: Шангалы) is the name of several rural localities in Ustyansky District of Arkhangelsk Oblast, Russia:

- Shangaly, Ilezsky Selsoviet, Ustyansky District, Arkhangelsk Oblast, a station in Ilezsky Selsoviet
- Shangaly, Shangalsky Selsoviet, Ustyansky District, Arkhangelsk Oblast, a selo in Shangalsky Selsoviet
