= Yershovsky (inhabited locality) =

Yershovsky (Russian: Ершовский; masculine), Yershovskaya (Ершовская; feminine), or Yershovskoye (Ершовское; neuter) is the name of several rural localities in Russia.

== Modern localities ==
- Yershovsky (rural locality), Chelyabinsk Oblast, a settlement in Novoyershovsky Selsoviet of Kizilsky District in Chelyabinsk Oblast; 52°30′N 59°09′E
- Yershovskaya, Arkhangelsk Oblast, a village in Vadyinsky Selsoviet of Konoshsky District in Arkhangelsk Oblast; 61°05′N 39°48′E
- Yershovskaya, Moscow Oblast, a village in Dmitrovskoye Rural Settlement of Shatursky District in Moscow Oblast; 55°21′N 39°44′E

== Alternative names ==
- Yershovskaya, alternative name of Yershevskaya, a village in Telegovsky Selsoviet of Krasnoborsky District in Arkhangelsk Oblast; 61°32′N 46°01′E
- Yershovskaya, alternative name of Yershovka, a village in Lyavlensky Selsoviet of Primorsky District in Arkhangelsk Oblast; 64°23′N 41°01′E
- Yershovskaya, alternative name of Yershevskaya, a village in Rostovsky Selsoviet of Ustyansky District in Arkhangelsk Oblast; 60°55′N 43°10′E
