= Ileza =

Ileza Илеза
- Settlement
- Location within Arkhangelsk Oblast Location within Russia
- Coordinates: 61°03′N 43°54′E
- Country: Russia
- Region: Arkhangelsk Oblast
- District: Ustyansky District
- Time zone: UTC+3:00

Ileza (Russian: Илеза) is a rural locality (a settlement) in Ustyansky District, Arkhangelsk Oblast, Russia. The population was 1,098 as of 2010. There are 27 streets.

== Geography ==
It is located 54 km east from Oktyabrsky.
