= Ustya (river) =

Ustya Russian: Устья
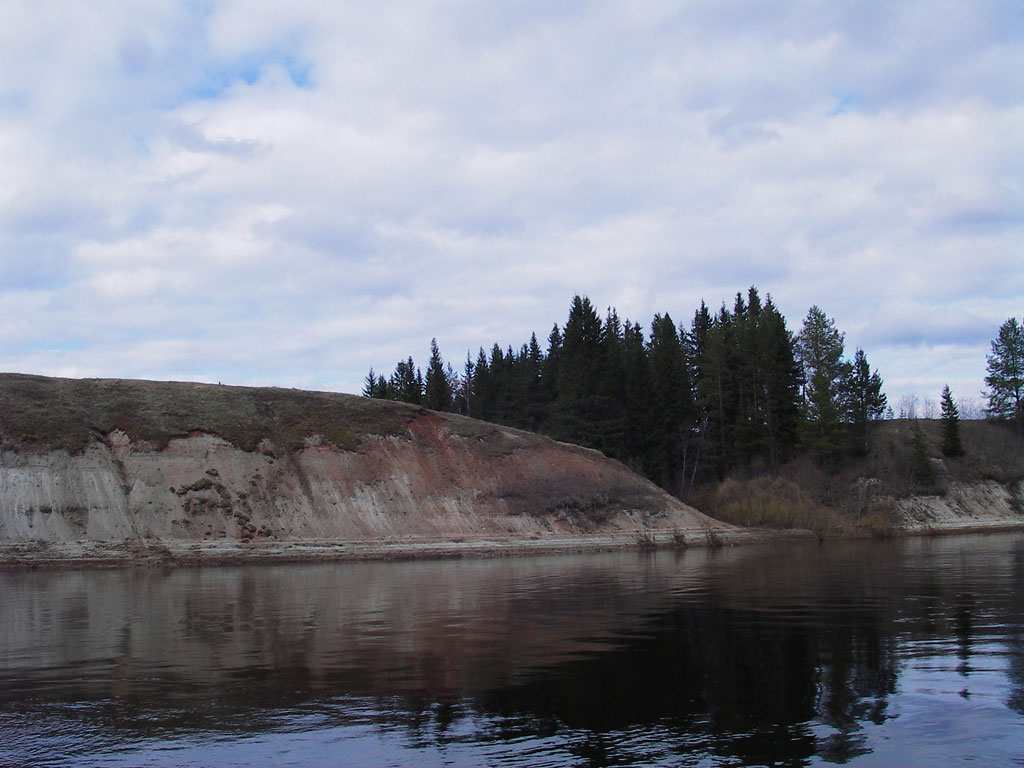
- The upper course of the Ustya River

Location
- Country: Russia

Physical characteristics
- Mouth: Vaga
  - coordinates: 61°31′30″N 42°36′10″E
- Length: 477 km (296 mi)
- Basin size: 17,500 km^{2} (6,800 sq mi)
- Discharge
  - average: 92.4 m^{3}/s (3,260 cu ft/s)

Basin features
- Progression: Vaga→ Northern Dvina→ White Sea

The Northern Dvina River basin

The Ustya (Russian: Устья) is a river in Kotlassky, Krasnoborsky, Ustyansky, and Velsky Districts of Arkhangelsk Oblast in Russia. A very short portion of the river also forms the boundary between Kotlassky District and Velikoustyuzhsky District of Vologda Oblast. The name of Ustyansky District originates from the river Ustya.

== Hydrology ==
It is a right tributary of the Vaga. The length of the river is 477 kilometres (296 mi). The area of its basin 17,500 square kilometres (6,800 sq mi). Its main tributaries are the Kizema and the Kokshenga (both left).

== Course ==
The Ustya starts at the border of Kotlassky District and Velikoustyugsky district, flows to the west, in part forming the boundary between the oblasts, then turns north-west and crosses into Krasnoborsky District. There it turns west and enters Ustyansky District, where the major part of its course is located. It first turns south and descends, turns west and accepts a major left tributary, the Kizema. Then it sharply turns north-west, and in the selo of Bestuzhevo, after the confluence with Veryuga (right) turns south again. Oktyabrsky, the district center of Ustyansky District, is located on the left bank of the Ustya. Downstream of Oktyabrsky, the Ustya turns north-west again and enters Velsky District. There it accepts a major tributary, the Kokshenga, from the left, 20 kilometres (12 mi) from its confluence with the Vaga. The mouth of the Ustya is in the village of Vlasovskaya.

== Navigation ==
The portion of the river which is 14 kilometres (9 mi) in its lower course from Blagoveshchenskoye downstream is listed in the State Water Register of Russia as navigable. Ustya River was used for timber rafting until the 1990s.
