= Oktyabrsky, Arkhangelsk Oblast =

Oktyabrsky Октябрьский
- Urban-type settlement
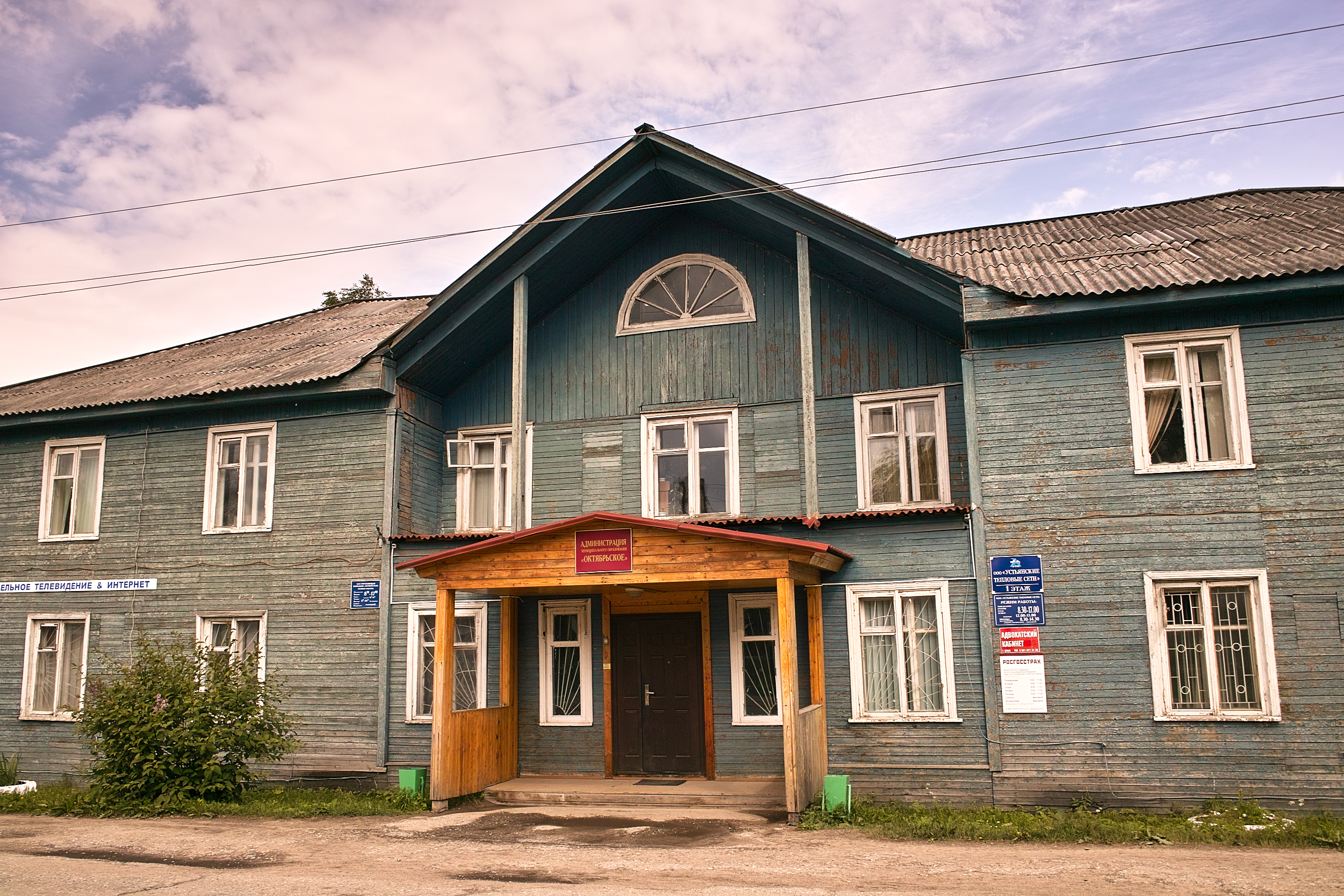
- Town hall of Oktyabrsky
- Interactive map of Oktyabrsky
- Location of Oktyabrsky Oktyabrsky (Arkhangelsk Oblast)
- Coordinates: 61°05′20″N 43°09′50″E
- Country: Russia
- Federal subject: Arkhangelsk Oblast
- Administrative district: Ustyansky District
- Founded: 1951

Population (2010 Census)
  - Total: 9,307
  - Estimate (2025): 9,431 (+1.3%)

Municipal status
  - Municipal district: Ustyansky Municipal District
  - Urban settlement: Oktyabrskoye Urban Settlement
  - Capital of: Ustyansky Municipal District, Oktyabrskoye Urban Settlement
- Time zone: UTC+3 (MSK)
- Postal code: 165210
- OKTMO ID: 11654151051

Oktyabrsky (Russian: Октя́брьский, known in 1951—1958 as Pervomaysky Первома́йский), is an urban locality (an urban-type settlement) and the administrative center of Ustyansky District of Arkhangelsk Oblast, Russia, located on the left bank of the Ustya River. Municipally, it is the administrative center of Oktyabrskoye Urban Settlement, the only urban settlement in the district. Population: 9,307 (2010 census); 10,081 (2002 census); 10,169 (1989 Soviet census).

== History ==
It was founded in 1951 due to the construction of Shangalskaya timber logging camp. Until 1958, it was known as Pervomaysky. Both names are derived from the Soviet holidays: Pervomaysky refers to the May Day, whereas Oktyabrsky refers to the October Revolution.

The population growth accelerated after a factory producing construction blocks was open in 1957.

Urban-type settlement status was granted to it in 1960, when former Pavlitsovsky Selsoviet was abolished, and its area was subordinated to the authority of Oktyabrsky.

On September 26, 1975, the administrative center of the district was transferred from the selo of Shangaly to Oktyabrsky, but it took some time before all the district services had moved.

== Economy ==
=== Industry ===
The industry of Oktyabrsky is mainly timber industry and production of concrete construction blocks. Timber used to be rafted down the Ustya River, but in the 1990s this practice was stopped.

=== Transportation ===
Paved roads connect Oktyabrsky with Velsk in the west and with Totma and Veliky Ustyug via Tarnogsky Gorodok in the south. There also are local roads in the district; one of which connects Oktyabrsky with the selo of Bestuzhevo in the north of the district.

Oktyabrsky is located several kilometers from the railway station of Kostylevo on the railroad connecting Konosha and Kotlas which eventually continues to Vorkuta.

== Culture and recreation ==
The only museum in the district is the Ustyansky District Museum, which opened in 1984 in Shangaly and moved to Oktyabrsky in 1987.

In the village of Pavlitsevo, close to Oktyabrsky, there is a newly built wooden church.

Ustyansky District is marketed as a regional center of beekeeping, and Oktyabrsky holds an annual honey festival Medovy Spas.
