= Led (river) =

Led Russian: Ледь
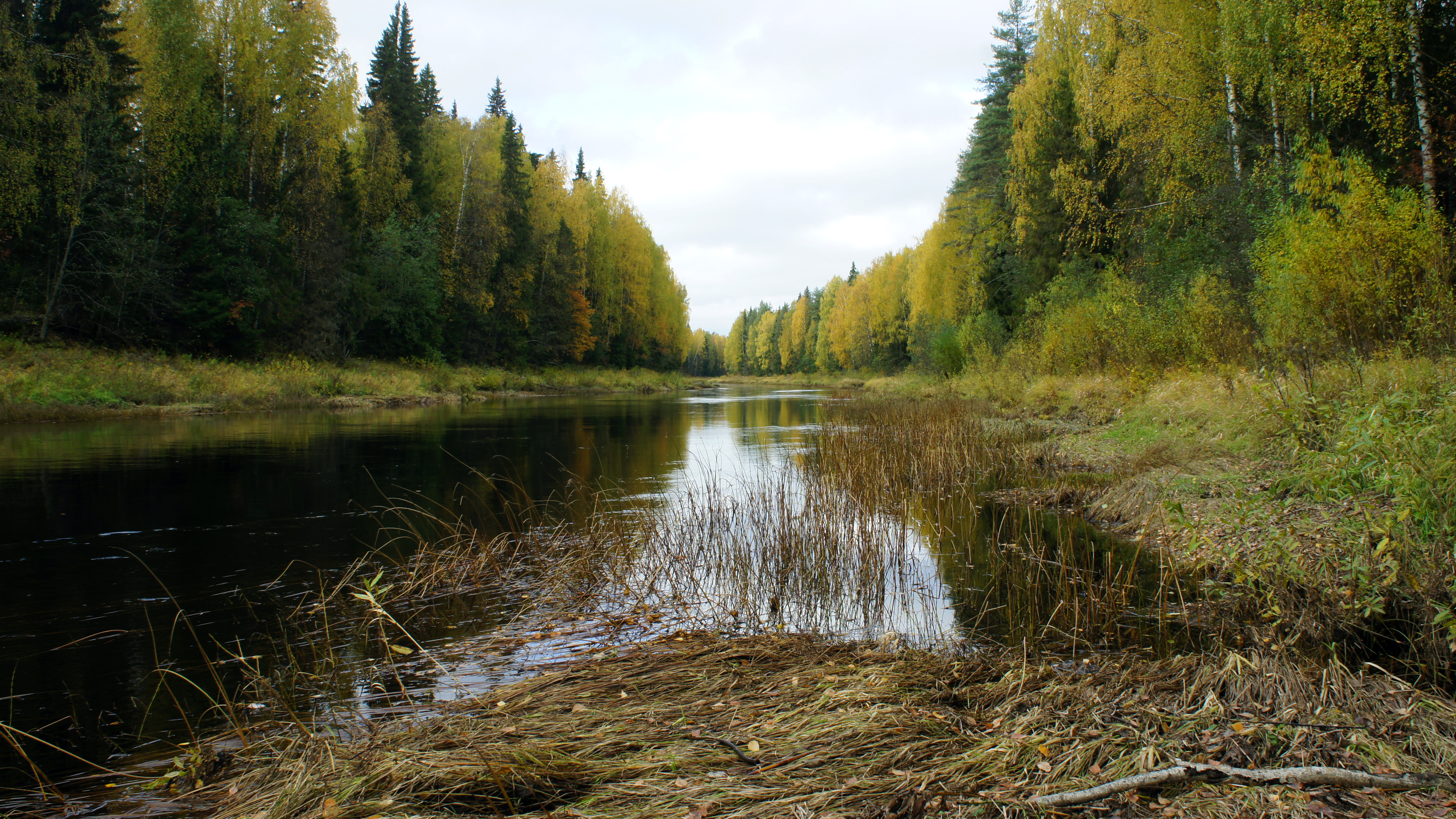

Location
- Country: Russia

Physical characteristics
- Mouth: Vaga
  - coordinates: 62°20′05″N 43°00′36″E
  - elevation: 24 m (79 ft)
- Length: 184 km (114 mi)
- Basin size: 2,690 km^{2} (1,040 sq mi)
- Discharge
  - average: 16.7 cubic metres per second (590 cu ft/s)

Basin features
- Progression: Vaga→ Northern Dvina→ White Sea

The Northern Dvina River basin

The Led (Russian: Ледь) is a river in Plesetsky and Shenkursky Districts of Arkhangelsk Oblast in Russia. It is a left tributary of the Vaga. It is 184 kilometres (114 mi) long, and the area of its basin is 2,690 square kilometres (1,040 sq mi). Its main tributary is the Tarnya (right).

The source of the Led is Lake Ledmozero, in the south of Plesetsky District. The river flows to the north-west through the swamps and enters Shenkursky District. The valley of the Led is populated downstream from the village of Paskandskaya, where it also turns south-east. Eventually, it turns north-west again and empties into the Vaga close to the village of Zhuravlyovskaya.

The Led, as is characteristic of the rivers in the Russian North, flows through coniferous forests (taiga), and villages in the valley are grouped in the openings of the forest close to each other. These groups can be separated by relatively large stretches of the river course. Downstream from the village of Zeleninskaya in Shenkursky District, where the Led enters the valley of the Vaga, the valley is open and almost continuously covered by villages.

The Led was used for timber rafting.
