= Puya (river) =

Puya Russian: Пуя
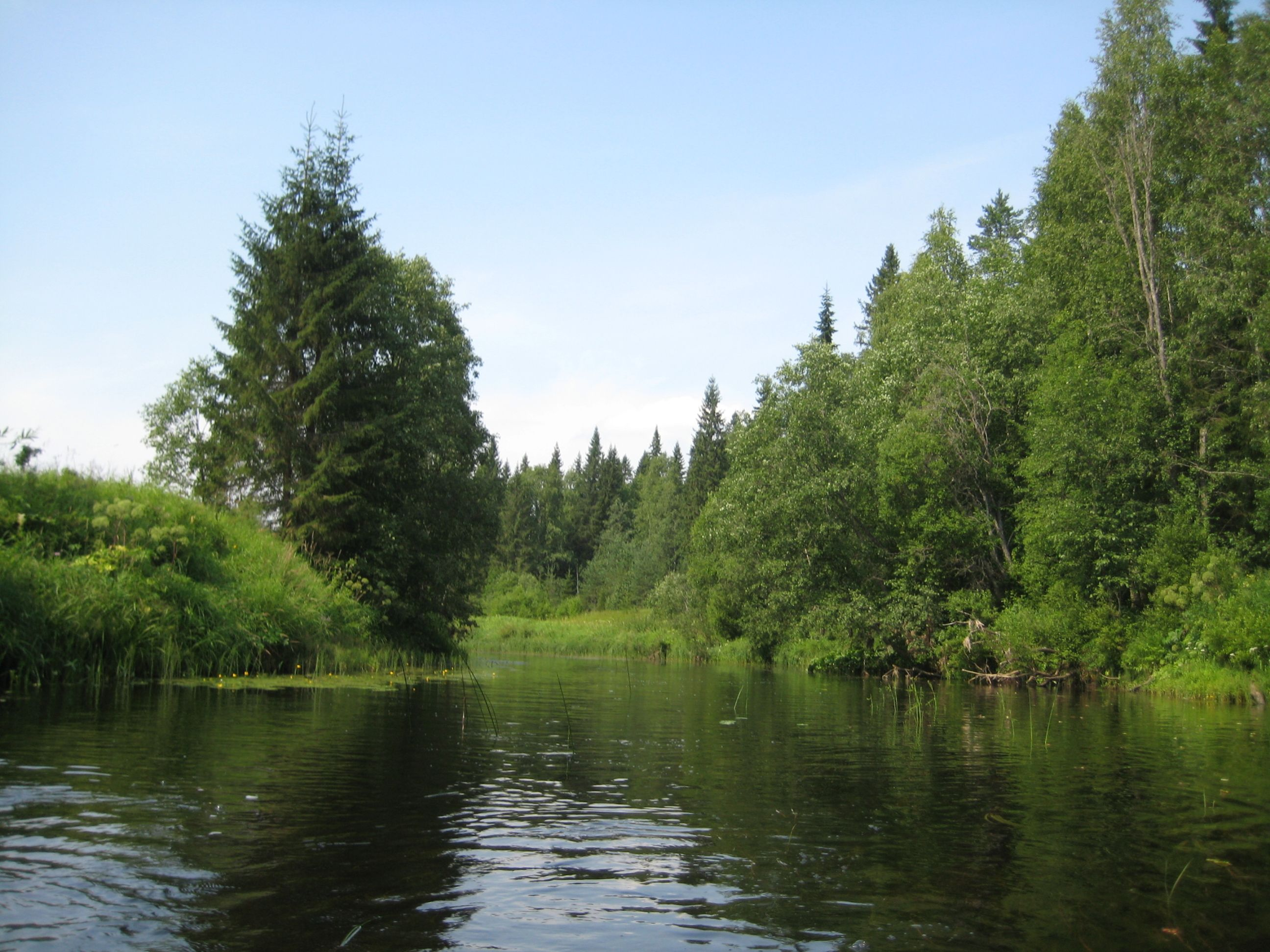

Location
- Country: Russia

Physical characteristics
- Mouth: Vaga
  - coordinates: 61°43′39″N 42°32′43″E
- Length: 172 km (107 mi)
- Basin size: 2,500 km^{2} (970 sq mi)
- Discharge
  - average: 25 cubic metres per second (880 cu ft/s)

Basin features
- Progression: Vaga→ Northern Dvina→ White Sea

The Puya (Russian: Пуя) is a river in Velsky and Shenkursky Districts of Arkhangelsk Oblast in Russia. It is a left tributary of the Vaga. The length of the river is 172 km (107 mi). The area of its basin 2,500 km^{2} (970 sq mi). The major tributary is the Sulanda (left).

The source of the Puya is located close to Yemenga, a village and a former station on the demolished railway line between Yura and Tyogrozero. It flows to the north-east, and in the selo of Georgievskoye turns south-east. Downstream from Georgievskoe, the valley of the Puya is populated, and on the left bank the road connecting Dolmatovo (on one of the principal highways in Russia, M8 connecting Moscow and Arkhangelsk) and Kargopol via Nyandoma has been built. In Dolmatovo, the Puya turns north, and M8 follows it on the right bank. About 9 km (5.6 mi) upstream from the confluence with the Vaga, the Puya accepts its major tributary, the Sulanda. Downstream from the mouth of the Sulanda, the Puya turns east. The mouth of the Puya is located in the village of Aksyonovskaya.
