= Norinskaya =

Norinskaya Норинская
- Village
- Location within Arkhangelsk Oblast Location within Russia
- Coordinates: 60°55′N 40°38′E
- Country: Russia
- Region: Arkhangelsk Oblast
- District: Konoshsky District
- Time zone: UTC+3:00

Norinskaya (Russian: Норинская) is a rural locality (a village) in Konoshsky District, Arkhangelsk Oblast, Russia. As of 2010, the population of the village was 7.

== Geography ==
Norinskaya is located 23 km east of Konosha (the district's administrative centre) by road. Lychnoye is the nearest rural locality.
