= Shangaly, Shangalsky Selsoviet, Ustyansky District, Arkhangelsk Oblast =

Shangaly Шангалы
- Selo
- Location within Arkhangelsk Oblast Location within Russia
- Coordinates: 61°07′N 43°20′E
- Country: Russia
- Region: Arkhangelsk Oblast
- District: Ustyansky District
- Time zone: UTC+3:00

Shangaly (Russian: Шангалы) is a rural locality (a selo) in Ustyansky District, Arkhangelsk Oblast, Russia. The population was 2,164 as of 2010. There are 35 streets.

== Geography ==
It is located on the Ustya River.
