= Dolmatovo, Kichmengsko-Gorodetsky District, Vologda Oblast =

Dolmatovo Долматово
- Village
- Location within Vologda Oblast Location within Russia
- Coordinates: 59°51′N 45°29′E
- Country: Russia
- Region: Vologda Oblast
- District: Kichmengsko-Gorodetsky District
- Time zone: UTC+3:00

Dolmatovo (Russian: Долматово) is a rural locality (a village) in Gorodetskoye Rural Settlement, Kichmengsko-Gorodetsky District, Vologda Oblast, Russia. The population was 20 as of 2002.

== Geography ==
Dolmatovo is located 37 km southwest of Kichmengsky Gorodok (the district's administrative centre) by road. Korkin Dor is the nearest rural locality.
