= Dolmatovo, Vladimir Oblast =

Dolmatovo Долматово
- Village
- Location within Vladimir Oblast Location within Russia
- Coordinates: 56°26′N 38°35′E
- Country: Russia
- Region: Vladimir Oblast
- District: Alexandrovsky District
- Time zone: UTC+3:00

Dolmatovo (Russian: Долматово) is a rural locality (a village) in Slednevskoye Rural Settlement, Alexandrovsky District, Vladimir Oblast, Russia. The population was 22 as of 2010. There are 3 streets.

== Geography ==
Dolmatovo is located 12 km northwest of Alexandrov (the district's administrative centre) by road. Kalinino is the nearest rural locality.
