= Kuloy (Vaga) =

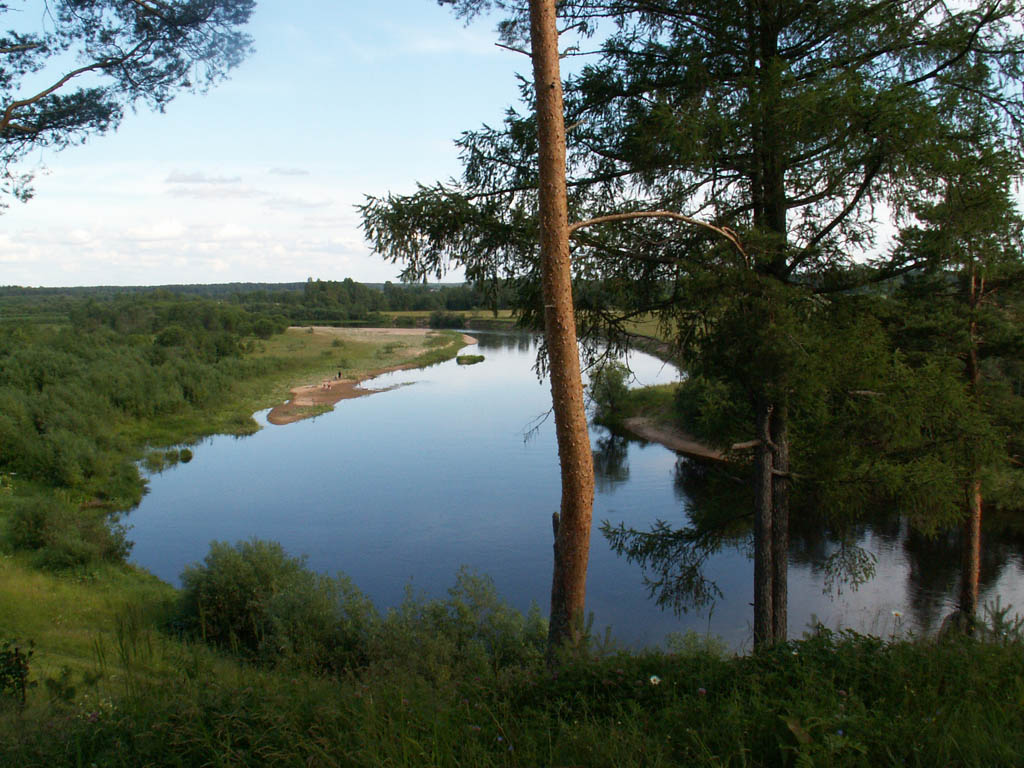
- Native name: Кулой (Russian)

Location
- Country: Russia

Physical characteristics
- Mouth: Vaga
  - coordinates: 61°00′00″N 42°11′47″E
- Length: 206 km (128 mi)
- Basin size: 3,300 km^{2} (1,300 sq mi)
- Discharge
  - average: 8.74 m^{3}/s (309 cu ft/s)

Basin features
- Progression: Vaga→ Northern Dvina→ White Sea

The Northern Dvina River basin

The Kuloy (Russian: Кулой) is a river in Totemsky and Verkhovazhsky Districts of Vologda Oblast and Velsky Districts of Arkhangelsk Oblast in Russia. It is a right tributary of the Vaga. The length of the river is 206 kilometres (128 mi). The area of its basin 3,300 square kilometres (1,300 sq mi). Its main tributaries are the Sivchuga (left) and the Kolenga (right).

The source of the Kuloy is in the Lake Sonduzhskoye north-west of the town of Totma. It flows north, then turns east, flows through Glubokoye Lake and then turns north again. This is a swampy area without any villages on the river banks. Approximately at the border with Tarnogsky District the Kuloy exits the swamps. The first village (on the left bank) is Rogna, which was the starting point for timber rafting. Downstream of Rogna, the river valley is populated. Downstream of the mouth of the Kundeba, the Kuloy turns north-west and eventually enters Arkhangelsk Oblast. There, Kuloy River accepts two of its biggest tributaries: the Sivchuga from the left and the Kolenga from the right. Downstream of the mouth of the Kolenga, the Kuloy sharply turns west. The mouth of the Kuloy is close to the village of Shulepovskaya.

The urban-type settlement of Kuloy is actually not located on the river Kuloy, but rather about 5 kilometres (3.1 mi) north of the river.

The Kuloy was used for timber rafting until the 1990s.
