= Konoshsky District =

Konoshsky District Коношский район (Russian)
- District
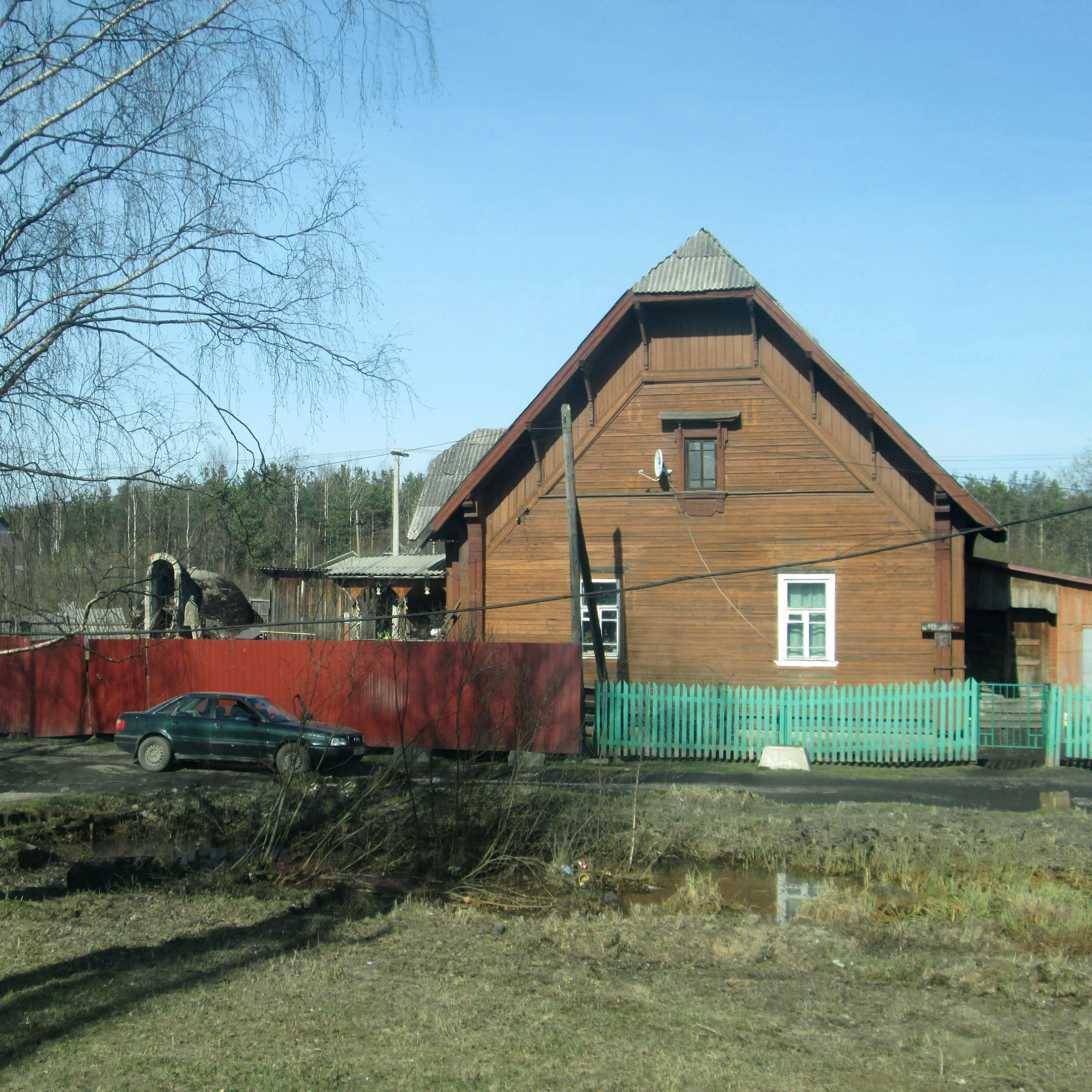
- House in Konosha

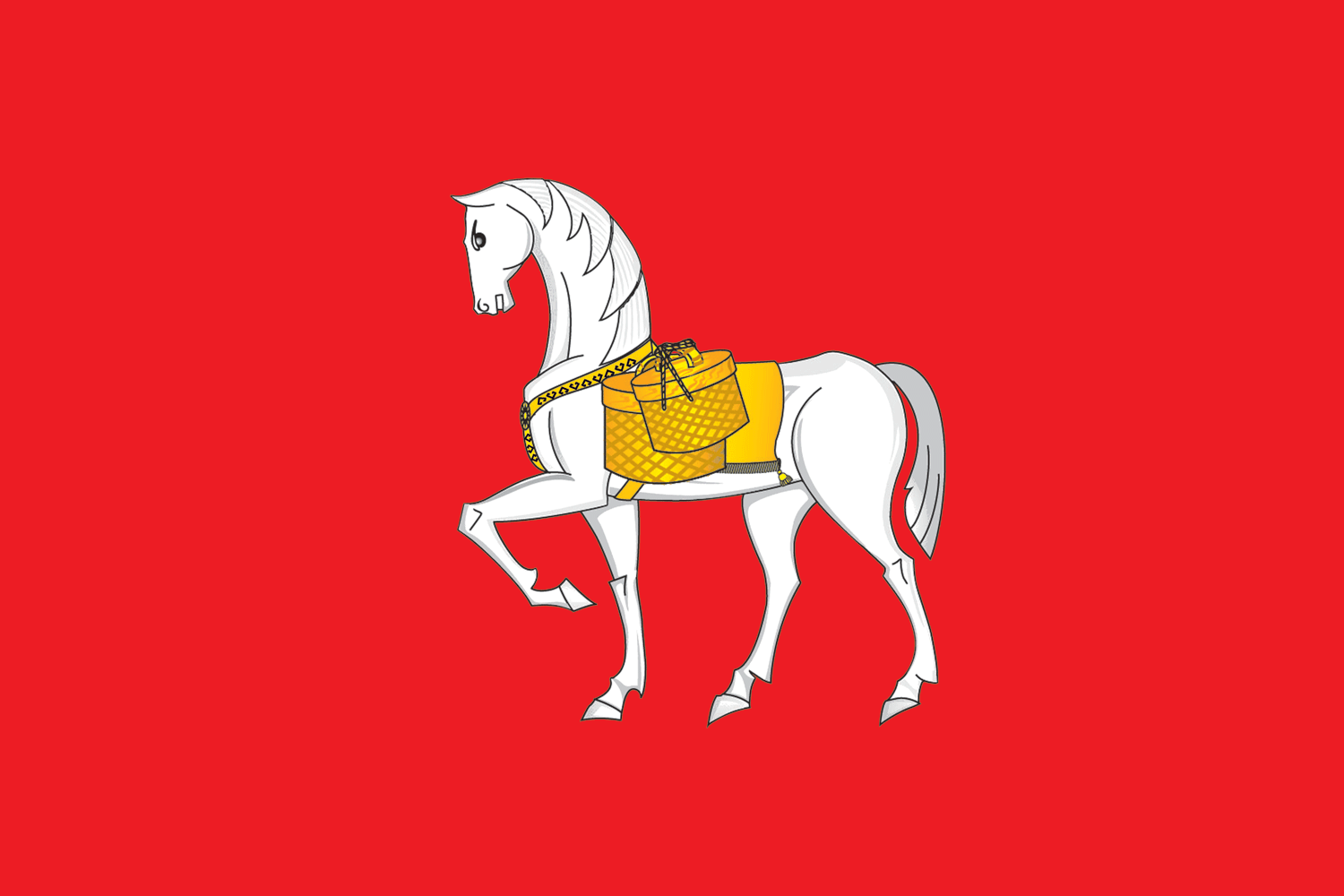
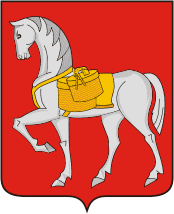
- Flag Coat of arms
- Location of Konoshsky District in Arkhangelsk Oblast
- Coordinates: 60°58′N 40°14′E
- Country: Russia
- Federal subject: Arkhangelsk Oblast
- Established: March 21–22, 1935
- Administrative center: Konosha

Area
  - Total: 8,500 km^{2} (3,300 sq mi)

Population (2010 Census)
  - Total: 26,106
  - Density: 3.1/km^{2} (8.0/sq mi)
  - Urban: 47.6%
  - Rural: 52.4%

Administrative structure
  - Administrative divisions: 1 Urban-type settlements with jurisdictional territory, 10 Selsoviets
  - Inhabited localities: 1 urban-type settlements, 164 rural localities

Municipal structure
  - Municipally incorporated as: Konoshsky Municipal District
  - Municipal divisions: 1 urban settlements, 7 rural settlements
- Time zone: UTC+3 (MSK)
- OKTMO ID: 11622000
- Website: http://www.konosha.ru/

Konoshsky District (Russian: Ко́ношский райо́н) is an administrative district (raion), one of the twenty-one in Arkhangelsk Oblast, Russia. As a municipal division, it is incorporated as Konoshsky Municipal District. It is located in the southwest of the oblast and borders with Nyandomsky District in the north, Velsky District in the east, Verkhovazhsky, Vozhegodsky, and Kirillovsky Districts of Vologda Oblast in the south, and with Kargopolsky District in the west. The area of the district is 8,500 square kilometers (3,300 sq mi). Its administrative center is the urban locality (an urban-type settlement) of Konosha. Population: 26,106 (2010 census); 31,067 (2002 census); 42,136 (1989 Soviet census). The population of Konosha accounts for 47.6% of the district's total population.

== History ==
The area was populated by speakers of Uralic languages and then colonized by the Novgorod Republic. After the fall of Novgorod, the area became a part of the Grand Duchy of Moscow. In the course of the administrative reform carried out in 1708 by Peter the Great, the area was split between Ingermanland Governorate (known from 1710 as Saint Petersburg Governorate), and from 1727, a separate Novgorod Governorate (west) and Archangelgorod Governorate (east). In 1780, Arkhangelogorod Governorate was abolished and transformed into Vologda Viceroyalty and in 1796 the latter was split into Arkhangelsk and Vologda Governorates. What is now Konoshsky District was then split between Kargopolsky Uyezd of Olonets Governorate, Kirillovsky Uyezd of Novgorod Governorate, and Velsky and Kadnikovsky Uyezds of Vologda Governorate. On July 15, 1929, the uyezds were abolished, the governorates merged into the Northern Krai, and Konoshsky District was established among others. It became a part of Nyandoma Okrug of Northern Krai.

In the following years, the first-level administrative division of Russia kept changing. In 1930, the okrug was abolished, and the district was subordinated to the central administration of Northern Krai. In 1931, Konoshsky District was abolished, but it was re-created on March 21–22, 1935. In 1936, the krai itself was transformed into Northern Oblast. In 1937, Northern Oblast was split into Arkhangelsk Oblast and Vologda Oblast. Konoshsky District remained in Arkhangelsk Oblast ever since.

== Location and geography ==
The district is divided between the basins of the Onega, Sukhona, and Vaga Rivers, although none of these rivers flows through the district. The rivers in the northwestern part of Konoshsky District drain into the Onega, with the major river being the Voloshka. The northwestern shore of Lake Vozhe, also in the basin of the Onega River, belongs to Konoshsky District, but the lake itself is in Vologda Oblast. The Kubena River, which drains into Lake Kubenskoye (from which the Sukhona flows) has its source in the district. The east of the district is in the basin of the Vel River and minor areas in the southwest belong to the basin of the Pezhma, another left tributary of the Vaga.

Much of the district is covered by coniferous forests (taiga).

== Administrative and municipal status ==
The borders of Konoshsky District for the most part conform to those of the municipal district, with the exception of the settlement of Sovza, which is administratively a part of Yertsevsky Selsoviet of Konoshsky District, but is municipally incorporated within Ukhotskoye Rural Settlement of Kargopolsky Municipal District.

=== Administrative divisions ===
As an administrative division, the district is divided into ten selsoviets and one urban-type settlement with jurisdictional territory (Konosha). Three inhabited localities which previously had urban-type settlement status were downgraded to rural status in 2006. These are Podyuga, Voloshka, and Yertsevo. The following selsoviets have been established (the administrative centers are given in parentheses):

- Danilovsky (Konosha);
- Glubokovsky (Sosnovka);
- Khmelnitsky (Papinskaya);
- Klimovsky (Klimovskaya);
- Podyuzhsky (Podyuga);
- Tavrengsky (Ponomaryovskaya);
- Vadyinsky (Toporovskaya);
- Vokhtomsky (Fominsky);
- Voloshsky (Voloshka);
- Yertsevsky (Yertsevo).

=== Municipal divisions ===
As a municipal division, the district is divided into one urban settlement and seven rural settlements (the administrative centers are given in parentheses):

- Konoshskoye Urban Settlement (Konosha);
- Klimovskoye Rural Settlement (Klimovskaya);
- Mirny Rural Settlement (Mirny railway station);
- Podyuzhskoye Rural Settlement (Podyuga);
- Tavrengskoye Rural Settlement (Ponomaryovskaya);
- Vokhtomskoye Rural Settlement (Fominsky);
- Voloshskoye Rural Settlement (Voloshka);
- Yertsevskoye Rural Settlement (Yertsevo).

== Economy ==
=== Industry ===
In 2009, the most important industry in the district was timber industry (52.7% of GDP), followed by the energy development (40.8%), and by the food industry (6.4%).

=== Agriculture ===
In 2008, thirty-five farms and two agricultural companies were registered in the district. They were growing crops, potatoes, and cereals, as well as produced milk.

=== Transportation ===
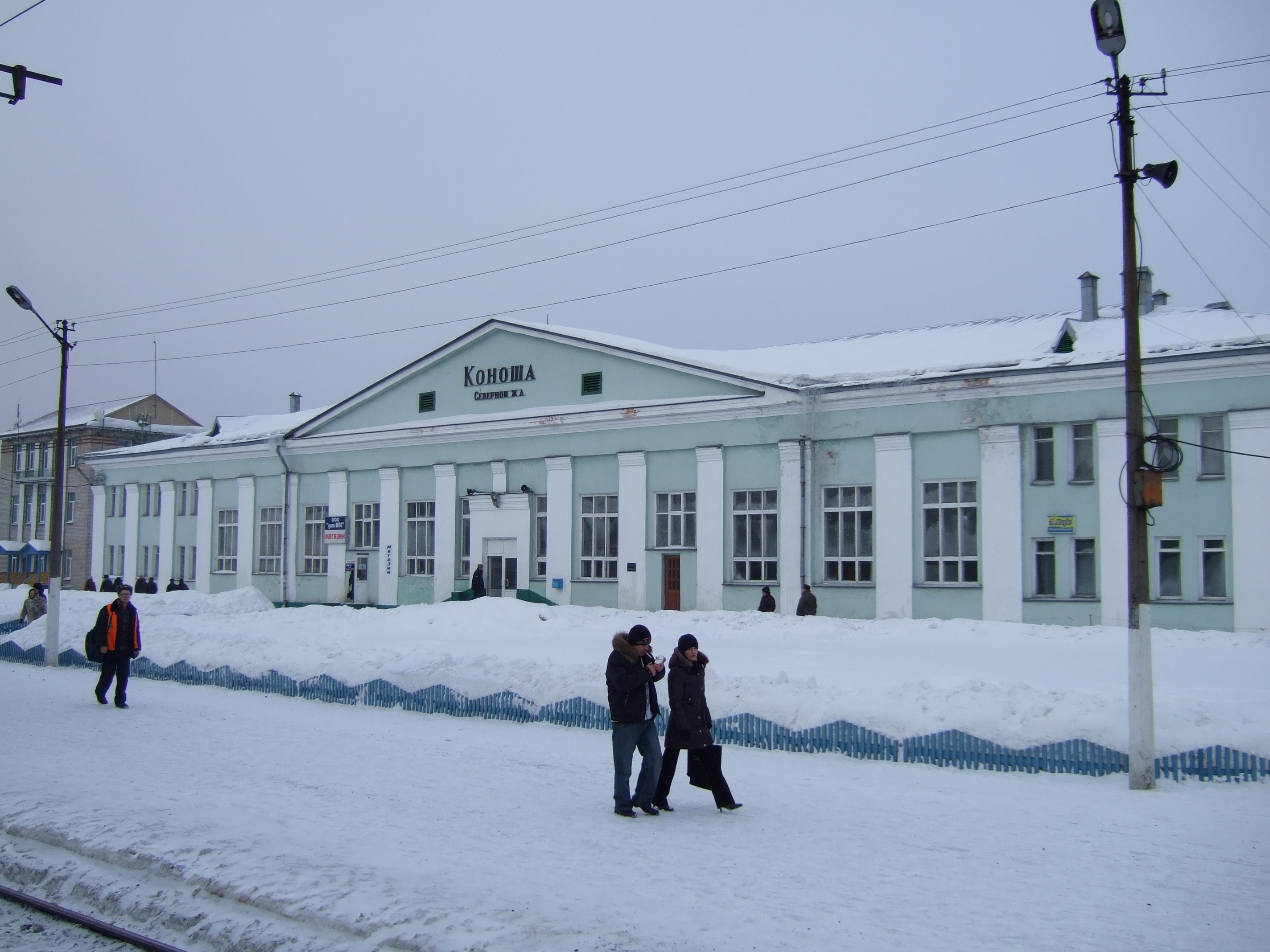
Konosha railway station

There are paved roads in the district, connecting Konosha with Velsk in the east and Nyandoma in the north. The road to Vozhega in the south has an unpaved stretch.

Konosha is a major railway hub. It is located on the railway line between Moscow and Arkhangelsk (built in the south-north direction), and in Konosha, the line to Kotlas which eventually continues to Vorkuta branches off to the east. The line from Moscow to Arkhangelsk uses the alternating current, whereas the stretch to Vorkuta does not have electrification; therefore, all trains from Moscow in the direction of Vorkuta have to change the locomotive and stop in Konosha for about twenty minutes.

== Culture and recreation ==
The district contains nine objects classified as cultural and historical heritage of local importance. Most of these are wooden rural houses built prior to 1917.

The only state museum in the district is Konoshsky District Museum, open in 2003.

In 1964–1965, future literature Nobel Prize winner Joseph Brodsky was exiled to the village of Norinskaya of Konoshsky District after being charged with social parasitism and convicted to eighteen months of hard labor. In 1965, the sentence was commuted. In the exile, Brodsky chopped wood and also studied Russian and American literature.
