= Vaga (river) =

Vaga Russian: Вага
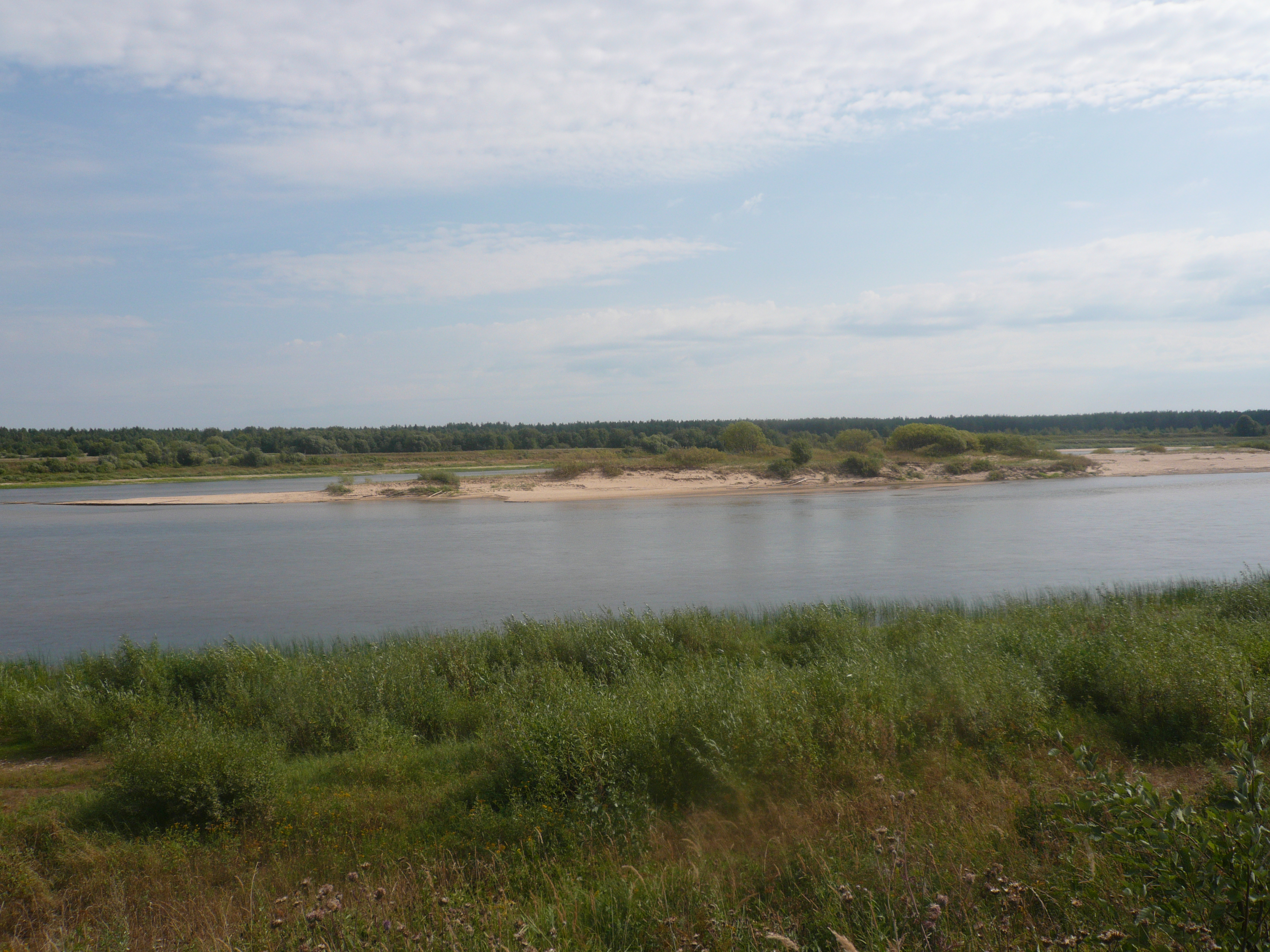
- The Vaga at Rovdino

Location
- Country: Russia

Physical characteristics
- Mouth: Northern Dvina
  - coordinates: 62°48′40″N 42°52′20″E
  - elevation: 13 m (43 ft)
- Length: 575 km (357 mi)
- Basin size: 44,800 km^{2} (17,300 sq mi)
- Discharge
  - average: 384 m^{3}/s (13,600 cu ft/s)

Basin features
- Progression: Northern Dvina→ White Sea

The Northern Dvina River basin (also shows the Vaga)

The Vaga (Russian: Вага) is a river in Totemsky, Syamzhensky, and Verkhovazhsky Districts of Vologda Oblast and in Velsky, Shenkursky, and Vinogradovsky Districts of Arkhangelsk Oblast in Russia. It is a left and the biggest tributary of the Northern Dvina. The length of the river is 575 kilometres (357 mi). The area of its basin 44,800 square kilometres (17,300 sq mi). The main tributaries of the Vaga are the Pezhma (left), the Kuloy (right), the Vel (left), the Ustya (right), the Puya (left), and the Led (left).

For Verkhovazhsky, Velsky, and Shenkursky Districts the Vaga is the main river, its valley being heavily populated, and the districts centers, the selo of Verkhovazhye (translated as on the Upper Vaga), and the towns of Velsk and Shenkursk, are located on the banks of the Vaga. In these districts, one of the principal highways in Russia, M8 connecting Moscow and Arkhangelsk, has been built on the left bank of the Vaga.

The source of the Vaga is located west of the village of Pakhtusovo, in the Totemsky District close to the border with the Syamzhensky District. The river flows north-west, enters Syamzhensky District, crosses it, enters Verkhovazhsky District, and turns north-east. Whereas the whole course of the river is in taiga, large areas in the valley of the Vaga are occupied by the meadows. The selo of Verkhovazhye is located on the left bank of the Vaga. The river than enters Arkhangelsk oblast, accepts the Pezhma from the left, the Kuloy from the right, and the Vel from the left in the town of Velsk. In Velsk, it also crosses the railway line connecting Konosha with Kotlas and eventually with Vorkuta. The biggest tributary of the Vaga is the Ustya, the mouth of the Ustya is in the village of Vlasovskaya. Downstream from the confluence with the Ustya, Vaga accepts the Puya from the left, and on the right bank there is the town of Shenkursk. There is no bridge in Shenkursk, and the town is connected with the highway only by the ferry crossing. Downstream from Shenkursk, the river accepts the Led from the left and enters Vinogradovsky District. The mouth of the Vaga is about 5 kilometres (3.1 mi) of the district center, the urban-type settlement of Bereznik.

The river freezes up in mid-November and stays under the ice until late April.

Most of the river is navigable during the high-water season, although there is no regular passenger navigation. The Vaga was used for timber rafting until the 1990s.
