= Velsky Uyezd =

Velsky Uyezd (Russian: Вельский уезд) was one of the subdivisions of the Vologda Governorate of the Russian Empire. It was situated in the western part of the governorate. Its administrative centre was Velsk, which now a city in the Arkhangelsk Oblast.

== Demographics ==
At the time of the Russian Empire Census of 1897, Velsky Uyezd had a population of 102,484. Of these, 99.9% spoke Russian as their native language. There was a minimal population of 31 Polish speakers.
