= Konosha =

Konosha Коноша
- Urban-type settlement
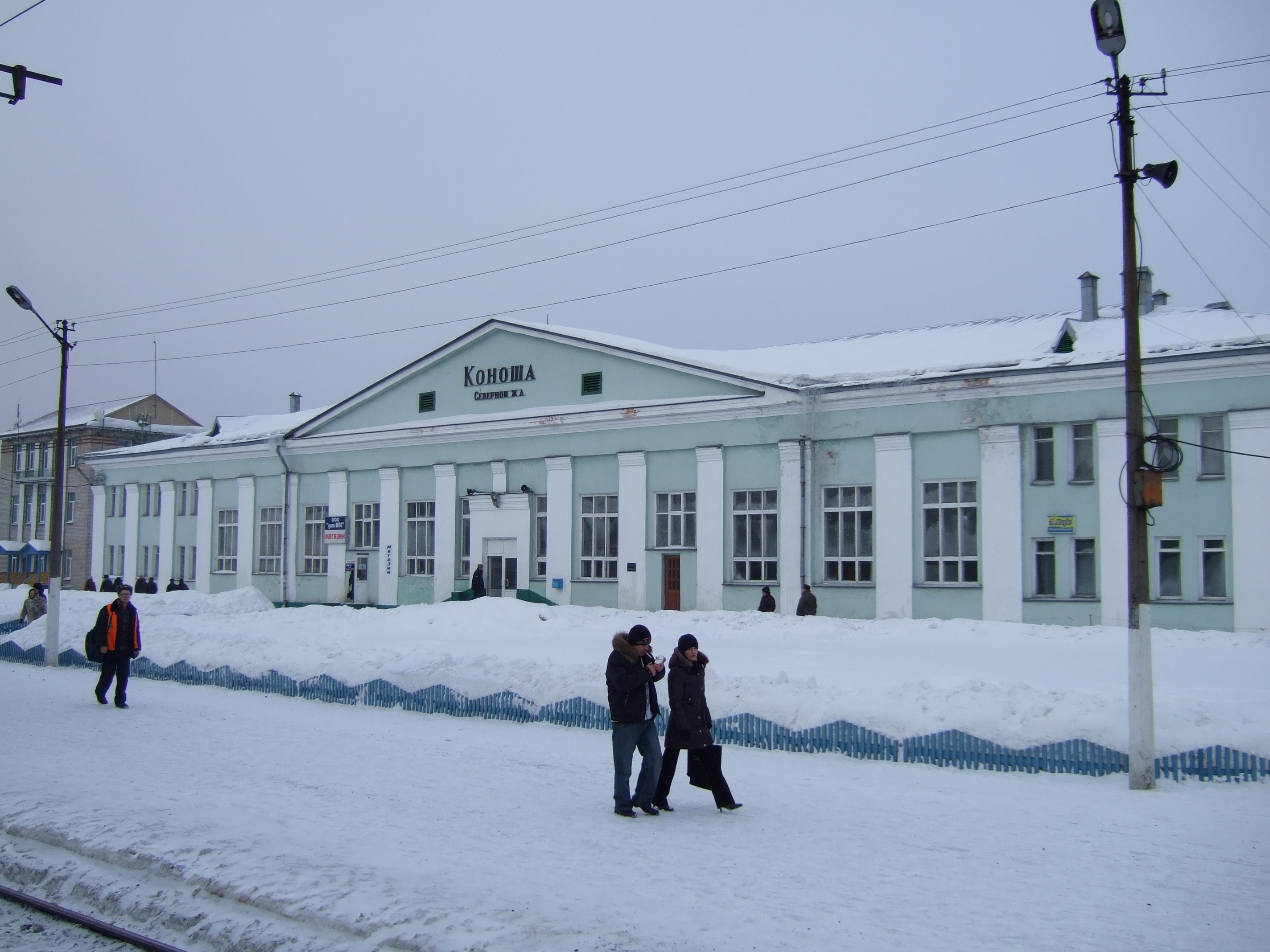
- Konosha railway station
- Interactive map of Konosha
- Location of Konosha Konosha (Arkhangelsk Oblast)
- Coordinates: 60°58′N 40°14′E
- Country: Russia
- Federal subject: Arkhangelsk Oblast
- Administrative district: Konoshsky District
- Founded: 1898

Population (2010 Census)
  - Total: 12,432
  - Estimate (2025): 10,080 (−18.9%)

Municipal status
  - Municipal district: Konoshsky Municipal District
  - Urban settlement: Konoshskoye Urban Settlement
  - Capital of: Konoshsky Municipal District, Konoshskoye Urban Settlement
- Time zone: UTC+3 (MSK)
- Postal codes: 164011, 164010
- OKTMO ID: 11622151051

Konosha (Russian: Ко́ноша) is an urban locality (an urban-type settlement) and the administrative center of Konoshsky District, Arkhangelsk Oblast, Russia, located on the Konosha River, 400 kilometers (250 mi) south of Arkhangelsk. It also serves as the administrative center of Danilovsky Selsoviet, one of the ten selsoviets into which the district is administratively divided. Municipally, it is incorporated as Konoshskoye Urban Settlement. Population: 12,432 (2010 census); 12,873 (2002 census); 17,143 (1989 Soviet census).

== Name ==
The name of the settlement is derived from the name of the Konosha River. The name of the river contains two element: -sha, which means "water" in the relevant Finnic languages, and -kon, which unclear etymology. If it is considered to be a Slavic word, it may mean either "beginning" or "border".

== History ==
The settlement was founded in 1896 in connection with the construction of the Yaroslavl–Vologda–Arkhangelsk railway line. It was granted urban-type settlement status in 1931. Konosha became the district center on July 15, 1929, when Konoshsky District was established as part of Nyandoma Okrug of Northern Krai In 1931, Konoshsky District was abolished, but on March 21-22, 1935, it was restored. Since 1937, Konosha has been part of Arkhangelsk Oblast.

== Economy ==
=== Industry ===
In 2009, the most important industry in Konoshsky District was timber industry (52.7% of GDP), followed by the energy development (40.8%) and by the food industry (6.4%).

=== Transportation ===
There are paved roads in the district, connecting Konosha with Velsk in the east and Nyandoma in the north. The road to Vozhega in the south has an unpaved stretch.

Konosha is a major railway hub. It is located on the railway line between Moscow and Arkhangelsk (built in the south-north direction), and in Konosha, the line to Kotlas which eventually continues to Vorkuta branches off to the east. The line from Moscow to Arkhangelsk uses the alternating current, whereas the stretch to Vorkuta does not have electrification, therefore all trains from Moscow in the direction of Vorkuta have to change locomotives and stop in Konosha for about twenty minutes.

== Culture and recreation ==
Konosha hosts the Konoshsky District Museum, which opened in 2003.

In 1964-1965, the future literature Nobel Prize winner Joseph Brodsky was exiled to the village of Norinskaya (which is now a part of Konoshskoye Urban Settlement) after being charged with social parasitism and convicted to eighteen months of hard labor. In 1965, the sentence was commuted. In the exile, Brodsky chopped wood and studied Russian and American literature.
