= Velsky District =

Velsky District Вельский район (Russian)
- District
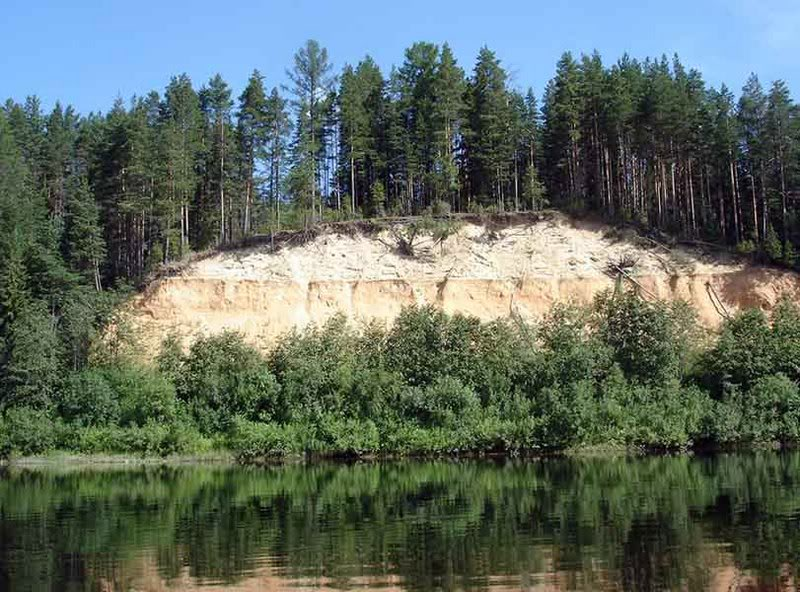
- The Ustya River near the confluence with the Kokshenga River in Velsky District

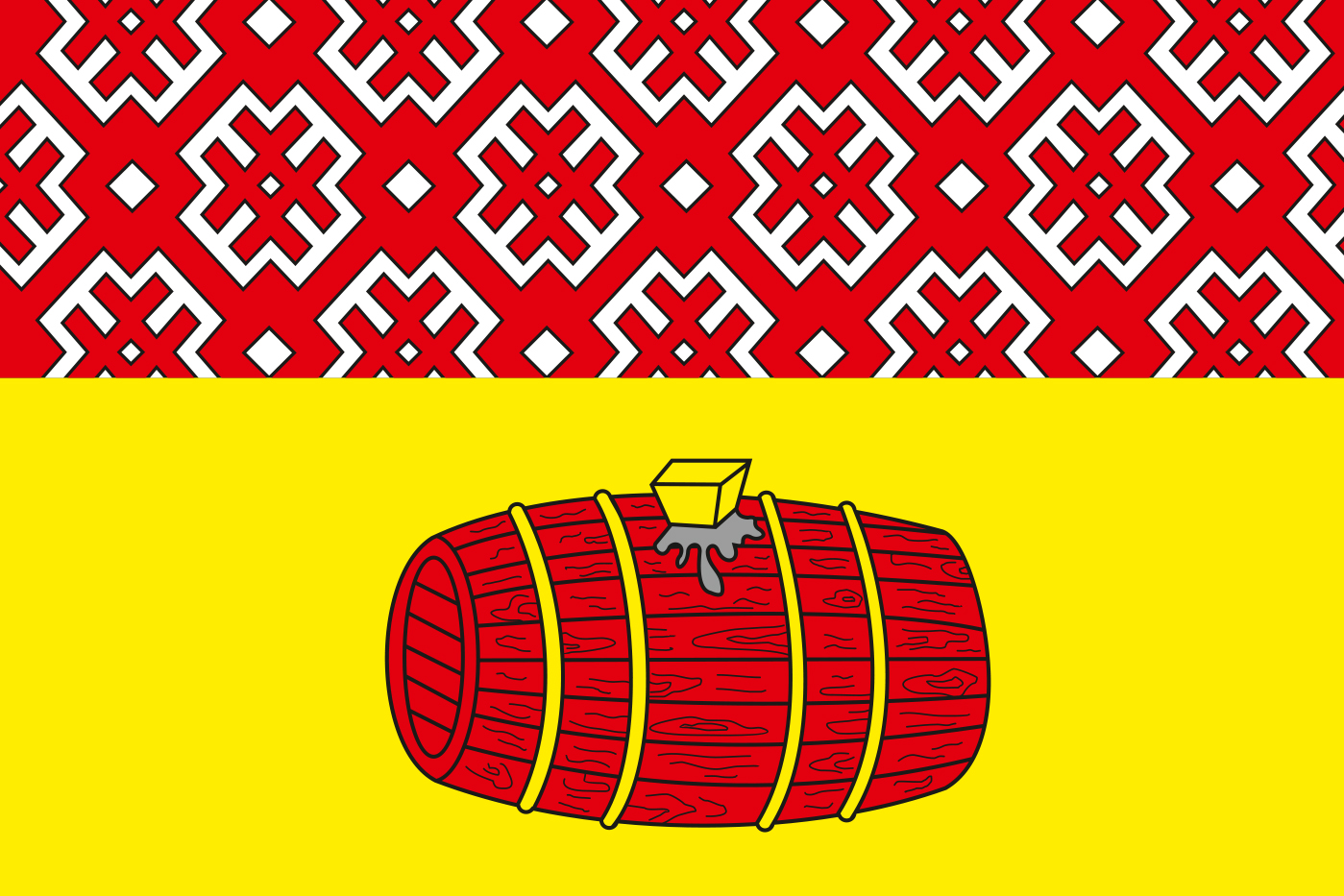
- Flag Coat of arms
- Location of Velsky District in Arkhangelsk Oblast
- Coordinates: 61°04′N 42°06′E
- Country: Russia
- Federal subject: Arkhangelsk Oblast
- Established: July 15, 1929
- Administrative center: Velsk

Area
  - Total: 10,060 km^{2} (3,880 sq mi)

Population (2010 Census)
  - Total: 54,792
  - Density: 5.447/km^{2} (14.11/sq mi)
  - Urban: 54.4%
  - Rural: 43.6%

Administrative structure
  - Administrative divisions: 1 Towns of district significance, 1 Urban-type settlements with jurisdictional territory, 20 Selsoviets
  - Inhabited localities: 1 cities/towns, 1 urban-type settlements, 320 rural localities

Municipal structure
  - Municipally incorporated as: Velsky Municipal District
  - Municipal divisions: 2 urban settlements, 20 rural settlements
- Time zone: UTC+3 (MSK)
- OKTMO ID: 11605000
- Website: http://www.velskmo.ru/

Velsky District (Russian: Ве́льский райо́н) is an administrative district (raion), one of the twenty-one in Arkhangelsk Oblast, Russia. As a municipal division, it is incorporated as Velsky Municipal District. It is located in the south of the oblast and borders with Shenkursky District in the north, Ustyansky District in the east, Verkhovazhsky District of Vologda Oblast in the south, Konoshsky District in the west, and with Nyandomsky District in the northwest. The area of the district is 10,060 square kilometers (3,880 sq mi). Its administrative center is the town of Velsk. Population: 54,792 (2010 census); 61,819 (2002 census); 71,474 (1989 Soviet census). The population of Velsk accounts for 43.6% of the district's total population.

== History ==
The area was populated by speakers of Uralic languages and then colonized by the Novgorod Republic. After the fall of Novgorod, the area became a part of the Grand Duchy of Moscow. Historically, it was a part of Vazhsky Uyezd, a vast area including almost all of the basin of the Vaga River. Velsk was first mentioned in the chronicles in 1137, and was granted the status of a posad in 1550. In the course of the administrative reform carried out in 1708 by Peter the Great, the area was included into Archangelgorod Governorate. In 1780, the governorate was abolished and transformed into Vologda Viceroyalty. Vazhsky Uyezd was split, and the area of the current Velsky District became a part of the newly established Velsky Uyezd. In 1796, Velsky Uyezd was transferred to Vologda Governorate and remained there until 1929, when several governorates were merged into Northern Krai. On July 15, 1929, the uyezds were abolished, and Velsky Uyezd was split into Velsky, Verkhovazhsky, and Ustyansky Districts. Velsky District became a part of Nyandoma Okrug of Northern Krai.

In the following years, the first-level administrative division of Russia kept changing. In 1930, the okrug was abolished, and the district was subordinated to the central administration of Northern Krai. In 1931, Verkhovazhsky District was merged into Velsky District, and in 1935, it was reestablished. In 1936, the krai was transformed into Northern Oblast. In 1937, Northern Oblast was split into Arkhangelsk Oblast and Vologda Oblast. Velsky District remained in Arkhangelsk Oblast ever since.

From 1929 to 1959 (with a brief break between 1931 and 1935), Rovdinsky District existed, with its administrative center located in Rovdino. It was initially formed as a part of Nyandoma Okrug on July 15, 1929, when Shenkursky Uyezd was split into Shenkursky and Rovdinsky Districts. On September 11, 1959, the district was abolished and split between Shenkursky and Velsky Districts; the district's administrative center Rovdino became a part of Shenkursky District.

== Geography ==
The district is located in the valley of the Vaga River, a major left tributary of the Northern Dvina. It is split by the Vaga and its major tributaries, the Ustya (right, with the left tributary, the Kokshenga River), the Kuloy (right), the Puya (left), the Vel (left), and the Pezhma (left). Minor parts of the district in the northwest belong to the basin of the Mosha River, a right tributary of the Onega (not in the basin of the Northern Dvina).

Most of the district is covered by coniferous forests (taiga).

== Divisions ==
=== Administrative divisions ===
As an administrative division, the district is divided into one town of district significance (Velsk), one urban-type settlement with jurisdictional territory (Kuloy), and twenty selsoviets. The selsoviets include (the administrative centers are given in parentheses):

- Argunovsky (Argunovsky);
- Blagoveshchensky (Blagoveshchenskoye);
- Khozminsky (Ispolinovka);
- Lipovsky (Malaya Lipovka);
- Muravyovsky (Voronovskaya);
- Nizovsky (Terebino);
- Pakshengsky (Yefremkovskaya);
- Pezhemsky (Pezhma);
- Poponavolotsky (Pasva);
- Puysky (Dolmatovo);
- Rakulo-Kokshengsky (Kozlovskaya);
- Shadrengsky (Shunema);
- Shonoshsky (Ust-Shonosha);
- Solginsky (Solginsky);
- Sudromsky (Pogost);
- Tyogrinsky (Tyogrozero);
- Ust-Shonoshsky (Ust-Shonosha);
- Ust-Velsky (Dyukovskaya);
- Verkhneshonoshsky (Komsomolsky);
- Verkhneustkuloysky (Meledinskaya).

=== Municipal divisions ===
As a municipal division, the district is divided into two urban settlement and twenty rural settlements (the administrative centers are given in parentheses):

- Velskoye Urban Settlement (Velsk);
- Kuloyskoye Urban Settlement (Kuloy);
- Argunovskoye Rural Settlement (Argunovsky);
- Blagoveshchenskoye Rural Settlement (Blagoveshchenskoye);
- Khozminskoye Rural Settlement (Khozmino);
- Lipovskoye Rural Settlement (Malaya Lipovka);
- Muravyovskoye Rural Settlement (Voronovskaya);
- Nizovskoye Rural Settlement (Terebino);
- Pakshengskoye Rural Settlement (Yefremkovskaya);
- Pezhemskoye Rural Settlement (Pezhma);
- Poponavolotskoye Rural Settlement (Pasva);
- Puyskoye Rural Settlement (Dovlatovo);
- Rakulo-Kokshengskoye Rural Settlement (Kozlovskaya);
- Shadrengskoye Rural Settlement (Shunema);
- Shonoshskoye Rural Settlement (Ust-Shonosha);
- Solginskoye Rural Settlement (Solginsky);
- Sudromskoye Rural Settlement (Pogost);
- Tyogrinskoye Rural Settlement (Tyogrozero);
- Ust-Shonoshskoye Rural Settlement (Ust-Shonosha);
- Ust-Velskoye Rural Settlement (Dyukovskaya);
- Verkhneshonoshskoye Rural Settlement (Komsomolsky);
- Verkhneustkuloyskoye Rural Settlement (Meledinskaya).

== Economy ==
=== Industry ===
Timber industry is the core industry of the district. The Vaga and the Ustya Rivers were used for timber rafting until the 1990s. Food production is also present.

=== Transportation ===
Velsk is located on one of the principal highways in Russia, M8 connecting Moscow and Arkhangelsk. A number of secondary roads branch off within the district limits, including the road from Velsk east to Oktyabrsky, from Velsk west to Konosha, and from Dolmatovo west to Nyandoma and Kargopol.

A section of the railroad connecting Konosha and Kotlas, which eventually continues to Vorkuta, lies in the district. The principal stations in the district are Velsk and Kuloy.

The railroad line from Yura to Tyogrozero, entirely within the district, was demolished in 2010.

Velsk Airport was active for passenger service until the 1990s, and not used for twenty years after that. In 2011, after a long break, a helicopter was tanked in Velsk. There are plans to use it for forest patrol aviation.

== Culture and recreation ==
The district contains 5 objects classified as cultural and historical heritage by Russian Federal law, and additionally 216 objects classified as cultural and historical heritage of local importance. Most of these are wooden rural houses built before 1917.

The five objects protected at the federal level are:

- Rostovsky Pogost, which is the ensemble consisting of the Ascension Church (1805) and the wooden St. Iliya Church (1756), in the village of Vozgretsovskaya
- Resurrection Church in the village of Zaruchevskaya;
- House of Alyoshkin in the village of Churkovskaya

The only museum in the district is Velsky District Museum.
