= Velsk =

Town in Arkhangelsk Oblast, Russia

Velsk Вельск
- Town
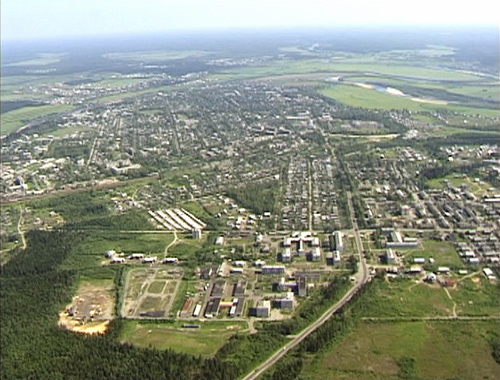
- Aerial view of Velsk

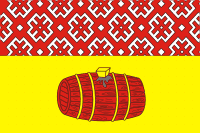
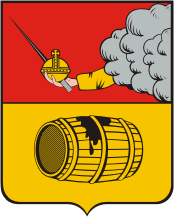
- Flag Coat of arms
- Interactive map of Velsk
- Location of Velsk Velsk (Arkhangelsk Oblast)
- Coordinates: 61°04′N 42°07′E
- Country: Russia
- Federal subject: Arkhangelsk Oblast
- Administrative district: Velsky District
- Town of district significanceSelsoviet: Velsk
- First mentioned: 1137
- Elevation: 90 m (300 ft)

Population (2010 Census)
  - Total: 23,885
  - Estimate (2023): 21,406 (−10.4%)

Administrative status
  - Capital of: Velsky District, town of district significance of Velsk

Municipal status
  - Municipal district: Velsky Municipal District
  - Urban settlement: Velskoye Urban Settlement
  - Capital of: Velsky Municipal District, Velskoye Urban Settlement
- Time zone: UTC+3 (MSK)
- Postal code: 165150
- OKTMO ID: 11605101001
- Website: www.movelsk.ru

Velsk (Russian: Вельск) is a town and the administrative center of Velsky District in Arkhangelsk Oblast, Russia, located on the left bank of the Vel River at its confluence with the Vaga River, 545 kilometers (339 mi) south of Arkhangelsk, the administrative center of the oblast. Population: 23,885 (2010 census); 26,241 (2002 census); 25,967 (1989 Soviet census).

== History ==
First attested in 1137, Velsk regularly suffered from inundations before it was moved to a higher spot in the 16th century. It was known as a pogost before 1555, as a posad between 1555 and 1780, whereupon it was incorporated as a town of Vologda Viceroyalty. Velsk developed as a merchant town, having profited from its location on the Vaga and late on the road connecting Moscow and Arkhangelsk (which in the 17th century was the only major trade harbor in European Russia). Trade fairs were held in Velsk; the most important one was the St. Athanasius Trade Fair.

In 1796, Velsky Uyezd was transferred to Vologda Governorate and remained there until 1929, when several governorates were merged into Northern Krai. On July 15, 1929, the uyezds were abolished and Velsk became the administrative center of Velsky District, a part of Nyandoma Okrug of Northern Krai. In 1936, the krai was transformed into Northern Oblast and in 1937, Northern Oblast was split into Arkhangelsk Oblast and Vologda Oblast.

== Administrative and municipal status ==
Within the framework of administrative divisions, Velsk serves as the administrative center of Velsky District. As an administrative division, it is, together with the railway station of Vaga, incorporated within Velsky District as the town of district significance of Velsk. As a municipal division, the town of district significance of Velsk, together with two rural localities in Ust-Velsky Selsoviet of Velsky District, are incorporated within Velsky Municipal District as Velskoye Urban Settlement.

== Economy ==
=== Industry ===
Town's economy is dominated by timber industry. Vaga was used for timber rafting until the 1990s. Food production is also present.

=== Transportation ===
Velsk is located on the M8 Highway—one of the principal highways in Russia connecting Moscow and Arkhangelsk. The secondary roads lead east to Oktyabrsky and west to Konosha, branching off in Velsk.

Velsk has a railway station (since 1942) on the railroad connecting Konosha and Kotlas, which eventually continues to Vorkuta.

The Velsk Airport provided passenger service until the 1990s, but has not been used since. In 2011, after a long break, a helicopter was tanked in Velsk. There are plans to use it as a base for the forest patrol aviation.

== Culture and recreation ==
The historical center of Velsk, though having lost many of its historical buildings, conforms to the 1780 town plan and is regarded as a historically preserved area. In all, Velsk contains nineteen objects classified as cultural and historical heritage of local importance, most of them being former merchant houses. The following objects are on the list:

- the whole architectural ensemble of Velsk
- Salnikov House (end of the 19th-beginning of the 20th century)
- Istomakhin House (1888)
- Shelovanova House (end of the 19th-beginning of the 20th century)
- Gorbunova House (1880)
- Orlov House (1885)
- Kotutin House (1902)
- Living House (end of the 19th-beginning of the 20th century)
- Trading House (end of the 19th-beginning of the 20th century)
- Transfiguration Cathedral (1898–1913)
- a house at 46 Dzerzhinsky Street
- a house at 49 Dzerzhinsky Street
- Assumption Church (wooden, 1795–1796)
- a house at 4 Komsomolskaya Street
- the ensemble of the Lenin Square, including the Popov house and a trading house
- prison church
- monument to the victims of the Civil War

Velsk hosts the Velsky District Museum.

== Education ==
In Velsk, there are five high schools, three high professional schools, two colleges (Velsk Agriculture College and Velsk College of Economics), and four regional branches of universities located elsewhere.

== Climate ==
Climate data for Velsk
Month	Jan	Feb	Mar	Apr	May	Jun	Jul	Aug	Sep	Oct	Nov	Dec	Year
Mean daily maximum °C (°F)	−11 (12)	−8 (18)	0 (32)	6 (43)	13 (55)	18 (64)	20 (68)	17 (63)	11 (52)	3 (37)	−2 (28)	−7 (19)	5 (41)
Daily mean °C (°F)	−12 (10)	−10 (14)	−3 (27)	2 (36)	9 (48)	14 (57)	16 (61)	13 (55)	8 (46)	2 (36)	−4 (25)	−9 (16)	2 (36)
Mean daily minimum °C (°F)	−15 (5)	−12 (10)	−6 (21)	−2 (28)	5 (41)	10 (50)	13 (55)	10 (50)	6 (43)	1 (34)	−6 (21)	−11 (12)	−1 (31)
Average precipitation days	21	19	17	15	13	13	12	14	15	20	22	24	205
Source: Weatherbase

== Notable people ==
- Georgii Karpechenko (1899–1941), Russian and Soviet biologist.
- Arseny Roginsky (1946–2017), Russian historian and human rights activist.
