= Niz =

Niz (Russian: Низ) is the name of several rural localities in Russia:

- Niz, Oshevensky Selsoviet, Kargopolsky District, Arkhangelsk Oblast, a village in Oshevensky Selsoviet of Kargopolsky District of Arkhangelsk Oblast
- Niz, Ukhotsky Selsoviet, Kargopolsky District, Arkhangelsk Oblast, a village in Ukhotsky Selsoviet of Kargopolsky District of Arkhangelsk Oblast
- Niz, Khavrogorsky Selsoviet, Kholmogorsky District, Arkhangelsk Oblast, a village in Khavrogorsky Selsoviet of Kholmogorsky District of Arkhangelsk Oblast
- Niz, Zachachyevsky Selsoviet, Kholmogorsky District, Arkhangelsk Oblast, a village in Zachachyevsky Selsoviet of Kholmogorsky District of Arkhangelsk Oblast
- Niz, Nyandomsky District, Arkhangelsk Oblast, a village in Limsky Selsoviet of Nyandomsky District of Arkhangelsk Oblast
- Niz, Plesetsky District, Arkhangelsk Oblast, a village in Tarasovsky Selsoviet of Plesetsky District of Arkhangelsk Oblast
- Niz, Bryansk Oblast, a settlement in Ovchinsky Selsoviet of Surazhsky District of Bryansk Oblast
- Niz, Kursk Oblast, a village in Starosavinsky Selsoviet of Cheremisinovsky District of Kursk Oblast
- Niz, Sverdlovsk Oblast, a village in Shalinsky District of Sverdlovsk Oblast
- Niz, Chagodoshchensky District, Vologda Oblast, a village in Megrinsky Selsoviet of Chagodoshchensky District of Vologda Oblast
- Niz, Kaduysky District, Vologda Oblast, a village in Chuprinsky Selsoviet of Kaduysky District of Vologda Oblast
