= Kargopolsky =

Kargopolsky (masculine), Kargopolskaya (feminine), or Kargopolskoye (neuter) may refer to:

- Kargopolsky District, a district of Arkhangelsk Oblast, Russia
- Kargopolsky Uyezd, an administrative division in the Russian Empire and the early Russian SFSR; most recently (1919–1929) a part of Vologda Governorate
- Kargopolskoye Urban Settlement, a municipal formation which the town of Kargopol and the village of Zazhigino in Kargopolsky District of Arkhangelsk Oblast, Russia are incorporated as
- Kargopolsky ITL, a Soviet gulag camp
