= Mosha (river) =

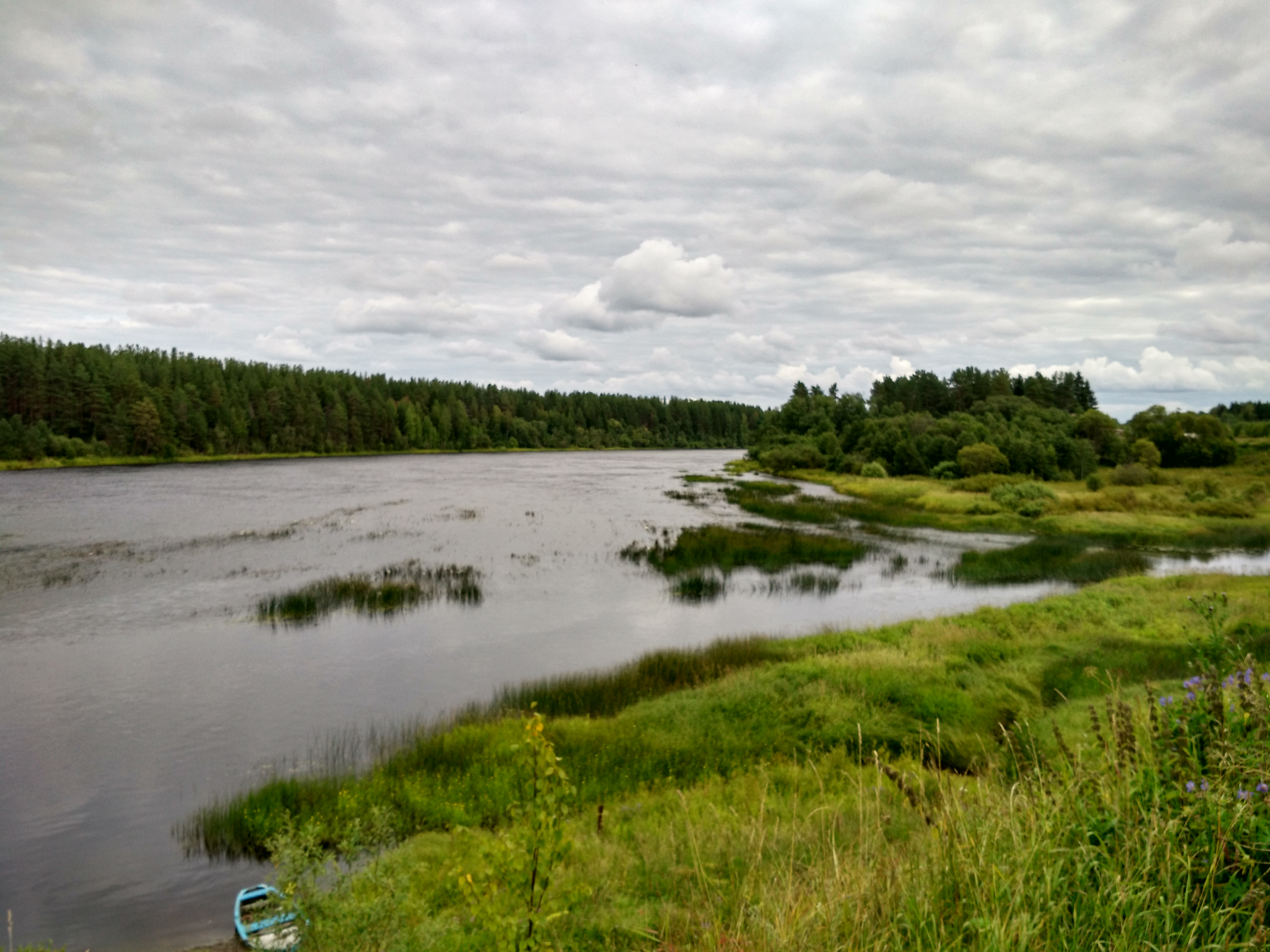
- Native name: Моша (Russian)

Location
- Country: Russia

Physical characteristics
- Source
  - location: Lake Bolshoye Moshenskoye
- Mouth: Onega
  - coordinates: 62°25′12″N 39°47′40″E
- Length: 131 km (81 mi)
- Basin size: 8,450 km^{2} (3,260 sq mi)

Basin features
- Progression: Onega→ White Sea

The Onega River basin

The Mosha (Russian: Моша) is a river in Plesetsky and Nyandomsky Districts of Arkhangelsk Oblast in Russia. It is a right tributary of the Onega. It is 131 kilometres (81 mi) long, and the area of its basin 8,450 square kilometres (3,260 sq mi). The main tributaries of the Mosha are Iksa (left), Lim (right), Lepsha (right), and Lelma (left). As a matter of fact, the longest tributary of the Mosha, the Lepsha, is longer than the Mosha itself.

The river basin of the Mosha includes almost all of Nyandomsky District and some areas in Plesetsky, Velsky, Konoshsky, and Shenkursky Districts. For a river of this length, the watershed area is rather big.

The source of the Mosha is Lake Bolshoye Moshenskoye in Nyandomsky District. The Mosha is however only the final part of a longer waterway: the Voyezerka which empties into Lake Bolshoye Moshenskoye has its source in Lake Spasskoye, another major lake in the area, and the right tributary of the Voyezerka, the Kanaksha, has a length of 98 kilometres (61 mi).

Starting from Lake Bolshoye Moshenskoye, the Mosha flows north-west and very soon accepts the Iksa from the left and the Lim from the right. Downstream, it also accepts the Shozhma from the left and the Nimenga from the right. The Mosha crosses the railway line between Konosha and Arkhangelsk at the station of Shalakusha and behind the station accepts the Lepsha from the right. Then it crosses into Plesetsky District and accepts the Lelma from the left. Close to the mouth, on the right bank of the Mosha there is a big selo of Fedovo. The mouth of the mosha is across the village of Boyarskaya.

The upper stretch of the river, close to the Lake Bolshoye Moshenskoye, is populated. The lowest village at this stretch is Malaya Orma. There are no villages between Malaya Orma and Shalakusha, and equally no villages between Shalakusha and Prokhnovo, upstream from Fedovo. There are villages located at some of the tributaries of the Mosha though.
