= Belaya, Arkhangelsk Oblast =

Belaya Белая
- Village
- Location within Arkhangelsk Oblast Location within Russia
- Coordinates: 61°12′N 38°52′E
- Country: Russia
- Region: Arkhangelsk Oblast
- District: Kargopolsky District
- Time zone: UTC+3:00

Belaya (Russian: Белая) is a rural locality (a village) in Kargopolsky District, Arkhangelsk Oblast, Russia. The population was 23 as of 2012. There are 2 streets.

== Geography ==
Belaya is located 40 km south of Kargopol (the district's administrative centre) by road. Timoshinskaya is the nearest rural locality.
