= Shelokhovskaya =

Shelokhovskaya Шелоховская
- Village
- Location within Arkhangelsk Oblast Location within Russia
- Coordinates: 61°54′N 39°06′E
- Country: Russia
- Region: Arkhangelsk Oblast
- District: Kargopolsky District
- Time zone: UTC+3:00

Shelokhovskaya (Russian: Шелоховская) is a rural locality (a village) and the administrative center of Priozernoye Rural Settlement of Kargopolsky District, Arkhangelsk Oblast, Russia. The population was 521 as of 2010. There are 20 streets.

== Geography ==
Shelokhovskaya is located 54 km north of Kargopol (the district's administrative centre) by road. Nikulinskaya is the nearest rural locality.
