= Vozhega (river) =

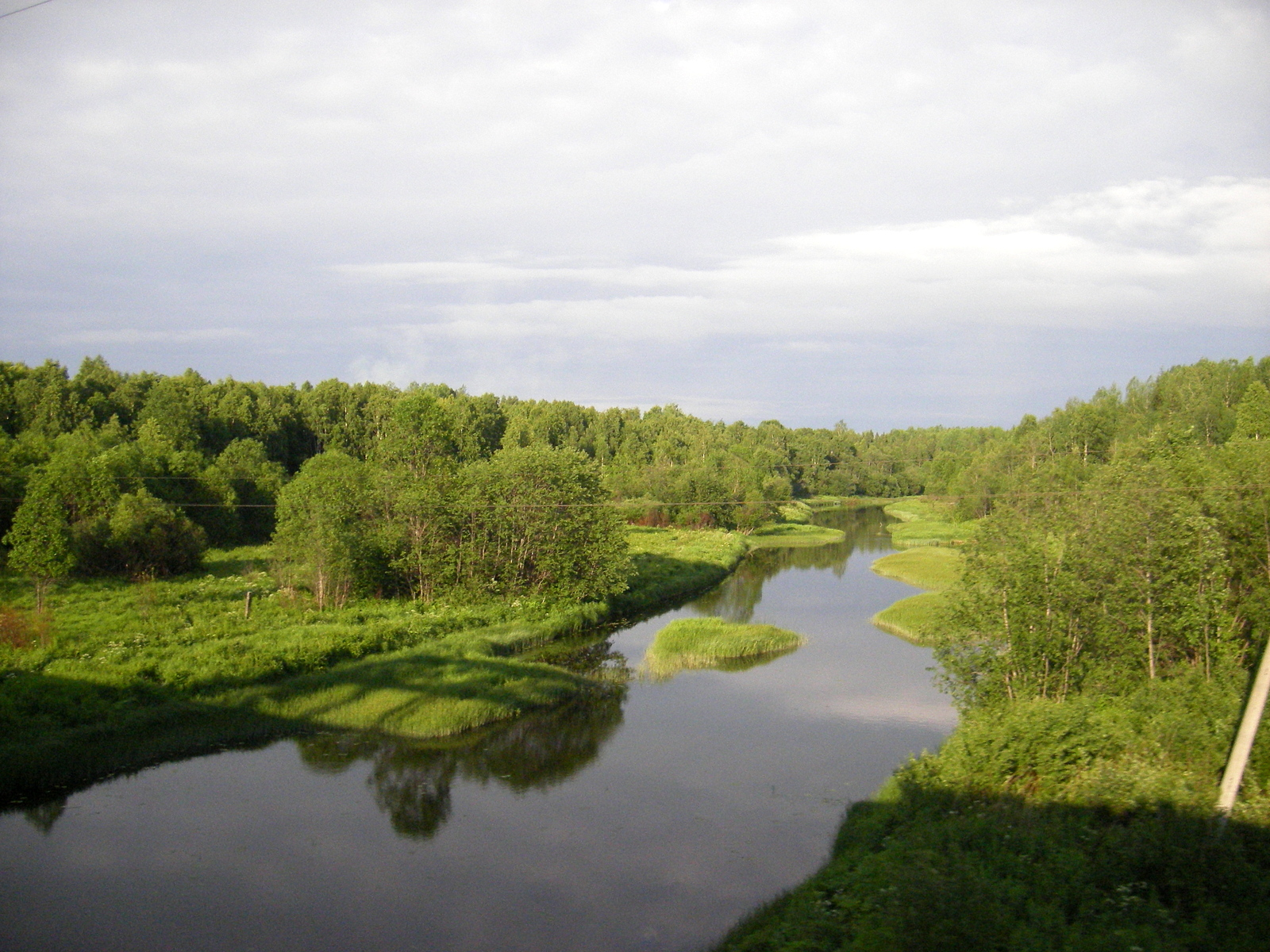
- Native name: Вожега (Russian)

Location
- Country: Russia

Physical characteristics
- Mouth: Lake Vozhe
  - coordinates: 60°32′49″N 39°10′20″E
  - elevation: 120 m (390 ft)
- Length: 140 km (87 mi)
- Basin size: 1,980 km^{2} (760 sq mi)

Basin features
- Progression: Lake Vozhe→ Svid→ Lake Lacha→ Onega→ White Sea

The Onega basin. The Vozhega is shown on the map.

The Vozhega (Russian: Вожега) is a river in Vozhegodsky District in the north of Vologda Oblast in Russia, a tributary of Lake Vozhe. The Vozhega belongs to the river basin of the Onega. It is 140 kilometres (87 mi) long, and the area of its basin 1,980 square kilometres (760 sq mi). The urban-type settlement of Vozhega, the administrative center of Vozhegodsky District, is located close to the river in its middle course on the right bank. Both the settlement and the district have their names originating from the name of the river. The main tributary of the Vozhega is the Chuzhga (right).

The river basin of the Vozhega occupies the western part of Vozhegodsky District and minor areas in the north of Kharovsky District of Vologda Oblast. It is surrounded from three sides (north, east, south) by the river basin of the Kubena, which drains into the Northern Dvina and does not belong to the basin of the Onega.

The source of the Vozhega is located in the south of Vozhegodsky District close to the border with Kharovsky District, approximately halfway between Kadnikovsky railway station and the village of Vysokaya. The Vozhega flows north, in the upper course in the woods, below the village of Rubtsovo open areas occur. Downstream of Rubtsovo the river course turns west and crosses the railway line connecting Vologda and Arkhangelsk. The urban-type settlement of Vozhega was founded as the railway station on the line, and, although its name is derived from the name of the river, the station is located at a distance of several kilometers from the river course. Downstream of the railway the valley of the Vozhega is almost continuously populated. The last village on the river banks is Nizhnyaya, several kilometers upstream from Lake Vozhe.

The mouth of the Vozhega lies in the swampy unpopulated area. The river is split there into three courses, the Ukma (south), the Vozhega proper (middle), and the Iksoma (north).
