= Podzyshevskaya =

Podzyshevskaya Поздышевская
- Village
- Location within Arkhangelsk Oblast Location within Russia
- Coordinates: 61°41′N 38°45′E
- Country: Russia
- Region: Arkhangelsk Oblast
- District: Kargopolsky District
- Time zone: UTC+3:00

Podzyshevskaya (Russian: Поздышевская) is a rural locality (a village) in Oshevenskoye Rural Settlement of Kargopolsky District, Arkhangelsk Oblast, Russia. The population was 4 as of 2010.

== Geography ==
Podzyshevskaya is located 25 km north of Kargopol (the district's administrative centre) by road. Agafonovskaya is the nearest rural locality.
