= Kiprovo =

Rural localities in Russia

Kiprovo (Russian: Кипрово) is the name of several rural localities in Russia:

- Kiprovo, Arkhangelsk Oblast, a village in Pavlovsky Selsoviet of Kargopolsky District of Arkhangelsk Oblast
- Kiprovo, Novgorod Oblast, a village in Tregubovskoye Settlement of Chudovsky District of Novgorod Oblast
- Kiprovo, Pskov Oblast, a village in Dnovsky District of Pskov Oblast
