= Zazhigino =

Zazhigino (Russian: Зажигино) is the name of several rural localities in Russia:

- Zazhigino, Arkhangelsk Oblast, a village in Pavlovsky Selsoviet of Kargopolsky District of Arkhangelsk Oblast
- Zazhigino, Pskov Oblast, a village in Bezhanitsky District of Pskov Oblast
