= Martakovo =

Martakovo Мартаково
- Village
- Location within Arkhangelsk Oblast Location within Russia
- Coordinates: 61°29′N 38°50′E
- Country: Russia
- Region: Arkhangelsk Oblast
- District: Kargopolsky District
- Time zone: UTC+3:00

Martakovo (Russian: Мартаково) is a rural locality (a village) in Kargopolsky District, Arkhangelsk Oblast, Russia. The population was 2 as of 2012.

== Geography ==
Martakovo is located 8 km southwest of Kargopol (the district's administrative centre) by road. Lukino is the nearest rural locality.
