= Prigorodny, Arkhangelsk Oblast =

Prigorodny Пригородный
- Settlement
- Location within Arkhangelsk Oblast Location within Russia
- Coordinates: 61°30′N 38°54′E
- Country: Russia
- Region: Arkhangelsk Oblast
- District: Kargopolsky District
- Time zone: UTC+3:00

Prigorodny (Russian: Пригородный) is a rural locality (a settlement) in Kargopolsky District, Arkhangelsk Oblast, Russia. The population was 565 as of 2010. There are 10 streets.

== Geography ==
Prigorodny is located 3 km west of Kargopol (the district's administrative centre) by road. Kargopol is the nearest rural locality.
