= Kalitinka =

Kalitinka Калитинка
- Village
- Location within Arkhangelsk Oblast Location within Russia
- Coordinates: 61°23′N 38°57′E
- Country: Russia
- Region: Arkhangelsk Oblast
- District: Kargopolsky District
- Time zone: UTC+3:00

Kalitinka (Russian: Калитинка) is a rural locality (a village) in Kargopolsky District, Arkhangelsk Oblast, Russia. The population was 81 as of 2012.

== Geography ==
Kalitinka is located 17 km south of Kargopol (the district's administrative centre) by road. Polupopovka is the nearest rural locality.
