= Vorobyovskaya =

Vorobyovskaya Воробьёвская
- Village
- Location within Arkhangelsk Oblast Location within Russia
- Coordinates: 61°42′N 38°44′E
- Country: Russia
- Region: Arkhangelsk Oblast
- District: Kargopolsky District
- Time zone: UTC+3:00

Vorobyovskaya (Russian: Воробьёвская) is a rural locality (a village) in Oshevenskoye Rural Settlement of Kargopolsky District, Arkhangelsk Oblast, Russia. The population was 49 as of 2010.

== Geography ==
Vorobyovskaya is located 27 km north of Kargopol (the district's administrative centre) by road. Agafonovskaya is the nearest rural locality.
