= Kazakovo =

Kazakovo Казаково
- Village
- Location within Arkhangelsk Oblast Location within Russia
- Coordinates: 61°31′N 39°08′E
- Country: Russia
- Region: Arkhangelsk Oblast
- District: Kargopolsky District
- Time zone: UTC+3:00

Kazakovo (Russian: Казаково) is a rural locality (a village) in Kargopolsky District, Arkhangelsk Oblast, Russia. The population was 391 as of 2010. There are 10 streets.

== Geography ==
Kazakovo is located 11 km east of Kargopol (the district's administrative centre) by road. Kuzino is the nearest rural locality.
