= Malaya Kondratovskaya =

Malaya Kondratovskaya Малая Кондратовская
- Village
- Location within Arkhangelsk Oblast Location within Russia
- Coordinates: 61°24′N 38°57′E
- Country: Russia
- Region: Arkhangelsk Oblast
- District: Kargopolsky District
- Time zone: UTC+3:00

Malaya Kondratovskaya (Russian: Малая Кондратовская) is a rural locality (a village) in Kargopolsky District, Arkhangelsk Oblast, Russia. The population was 4 as of 2012.

== Geography ==
Malaya Kondratovskaya is located 14 km south of Kargopol (the district's administrative centre) by road. Yeremeyevskaya is the nearest rural locality.
