= Agafonovskaya =

Agafonovskaya Агафоновская
- Village
- Location within Arkhangelsk Oblast Location within Russia
- Coordinates: 61°42′N 38°44′E
- Country: Russia
- Region: Arkhangelsk Oblast
- District: Kargopolsky District
- Time zone: UTC+3:00

Agafonovskaya (Russian: Агафоновская) is a rural locality (a village) in Oshevenskoye Rural Settlement of Kargopolsky District, Arkhangelsk Oblast, Russia. The population was 7 as of 2010.

== Geography ==
Agafonovskaya is located 26 km northwest of Kargopol (the district's administrative centre) by road. Vorobyovskaya is the nearest rural locality.
