= Zalyazhye =

Zalyazhye Заляжье
- Village
- Location within Arkhangelsk Oblast Location within Russia
- Coordinates: 61°33′N 38°55′E
- Country: Russia
- Region: Arkhangelsk Oblast
- District: Kargopolsky District
- Time zone: UTC+3:00

Zalyazhye (Russian: Заляжье) is a rural locality (a village) in Kargopolsky District, Arkhangelsk Oblast, Russia. The population was 3 as of 2012.

== Geography ==
Zalyazhye is located 7 km north of Kargopol (the district's administrative centre) by road. Kiprovo is the nearest rural locality.
