= Shiryaikha =

Shiryaikha Ширяиха
- Village
- Location within Arkhangelsk Oblast Location within Russia
- Coordinates: 61°52′N 38°45′E
- Country: Russia
- Region: Arkhangelsk Oblast
- District: Kargopolsky District
- Time zone: UTC+3:00

Shiryaikha (Russian: Ширяиха) is a rural locality (a village) and the administrative center of Oshevenskoye Rural Settlement of Kargopolsky District, Arkhangelsk Oblast, Russia. The population was 262 as of 2010. There are 5 streets.

== Geography ==
Shiryaikha is located 48 km north of Kargopol (the district's administrative centre) by road. Bolshoy Khaluy is the nearest rural locality.
