= Nyandomsky =

Nyandomsky (masculine), Nyandomskaya (feminine), or Nyandomskoye (neuter) may refer to:

- Nyandomsky District, a district of Arkhangelsk Oblast, Russia
- Nyandomskoye Urban Settlement, a municipal formation which the town of Nyandoma and eighteen rural localities in Nyandomsky District of Arkhangelsk Oblast, Russia are incorporated as
- Nyandoma Okrug (Nyandomsky okrug, 1929–1930), an administrative division of Northern Krai of the Russian SFSR in the Soviet Union
