= Volosovsky =

Volosovsky (masculine), Volosovskaya (feminine), or Volosovskoye (neuter) may refer to:

- Volosovsky District, a district of Leningrad Oblast, Russia
- Volosovskoye Urban Settlement, a municipal formation corresponding to Volosovskoye Settlement Municipal Formation, an administrative division of Volosovsky District of Leningrad Oblast, Russia
- Volosovskaya, a rural locality (a village) in Kargopolsky District of Arkhangelsk Oblast, Russia
