= Pogost Navolochny =

Pogost Navolochny Погост Наволочный
- Village
- Location within Arkhangelsk Oblast Location within Russia
- Coordinates: 61°45′N 38°43′E
- Country: Russia
- Region: Arkhangelsk Oblast
- District: Kargopolsky District
- Time zone: UTC+3:00

Pogost Navolochny (Russian: Погост Наволочный) is a rural locality (a village) in Kargopolsky District, Arkhangelsk Oblast, Russia. The population was 41 as of 2012.

== Geography ==
Pogost Navolochny is located 34 km north of Kargopol (the district's administrative centre) by road. Nifantovskaya is the nearest rural locality.
