= Loginovskaya =

Loginovskaya Логиновская
- Village
- Location within Arkhangelsk Oblast Location within Russia
- Coordinates: 61°47′N 40°51′E
- Country: Russia
- Region: Arkhangelsk Oblast
- District: Nyandomsky District
- Time zone: UTC+3:00

Loginovskaya (Russian: Логиновская) is a rural locality (a village) in Moshinskoye Rural Settlement of Nyandomsky District, Arkhangelsk Oblast, Russia. The population was 183 as of 2010.

== Geography ==
Loginovskaya is located on the Moshinskoye Lake, 44 km northeast of Nyandoma (the district's administrative centre) by road. Korekhino is the nearest rural locality.
