= Volosovskaya =

Volosovskaya Волосовская
- Village
- Location within Arkhangelsk Oblast Location within Russia
- Coordinates: 61°25′N 38°29′E
- Country: Russia
- Region: Arkhangelsk Oblast
- District: Kargopolsky District
- Time zone: UTC+3:00

Volosovskaya (Russian: Волосовская) is a rural locality (a village) in Kargopolsky District, Arkhangelsk Oblast, Russia. The population was 1 as of 2012.

== Geography ==
Volosovskaya is located 27 km southwest of Kargopol (the district's administrative centre) by road. Makarovskaya is the nearest rural locality.
