= Shozhma =

Rural locality in Russia

Coordinates: 61°56′N 40°16′E

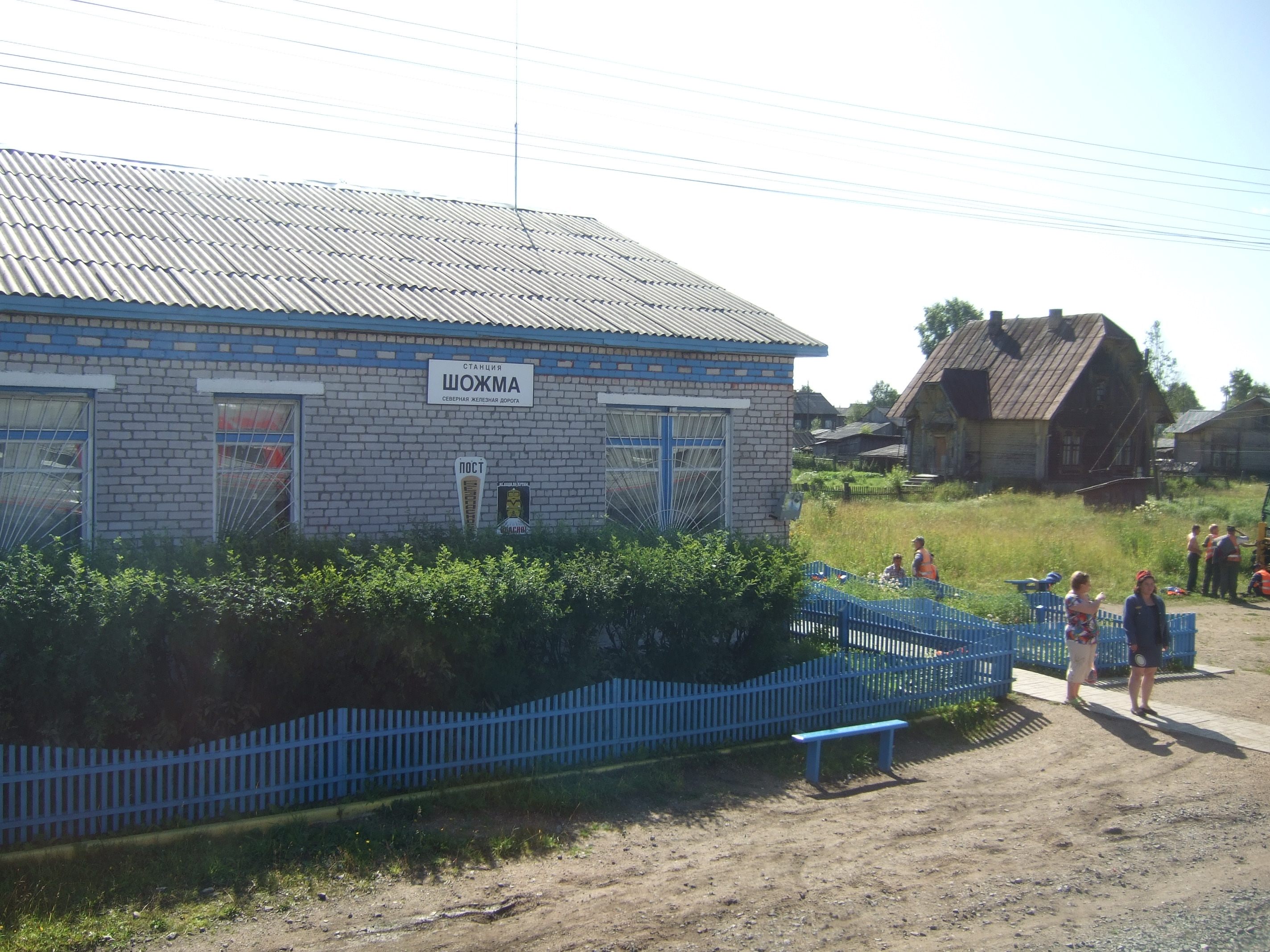
Shozhma railway station, 2009

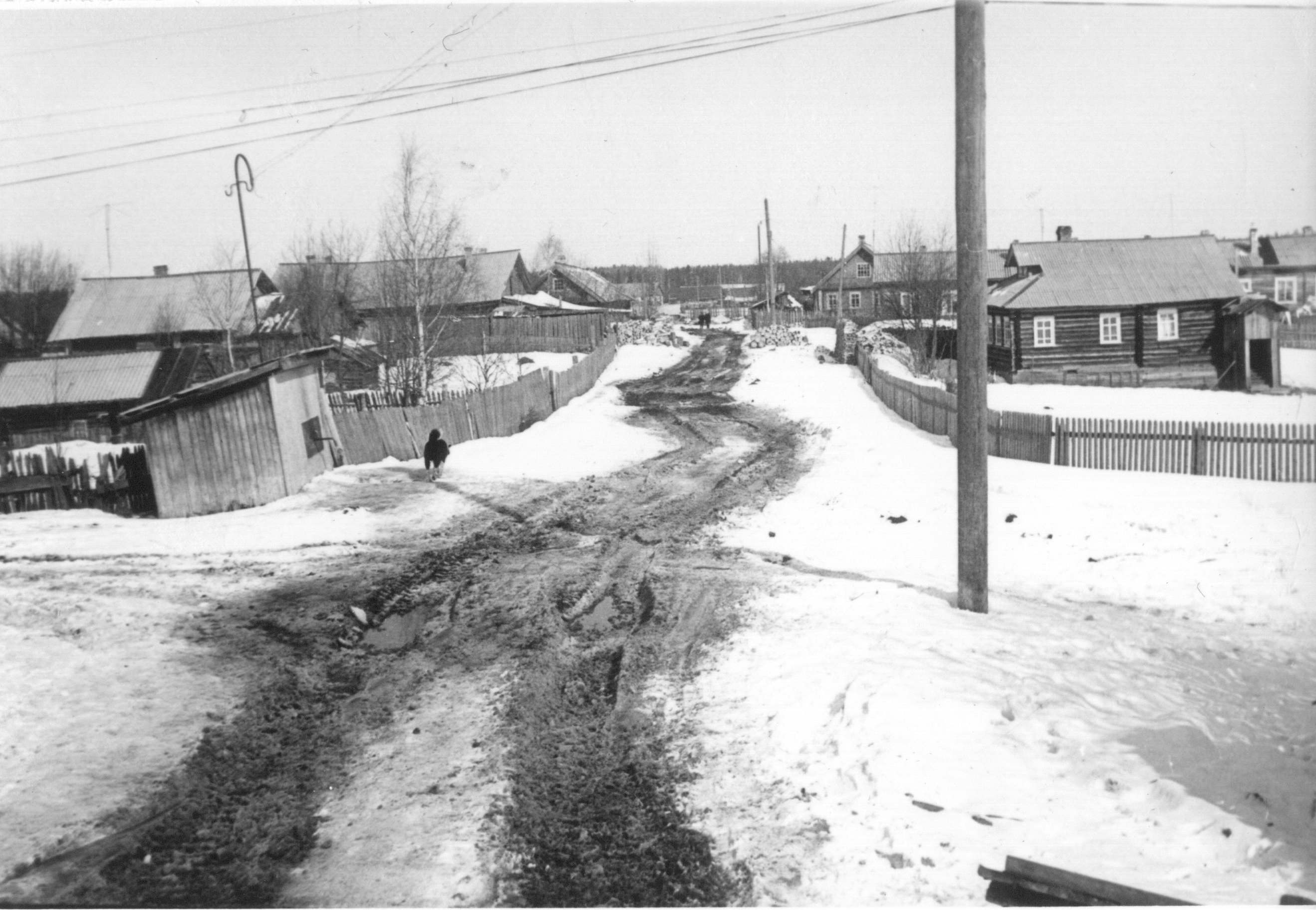
Shozhma in 1985

Shozhma (Russian: Шожма) is a rural locality (a railway station) in Nyandomsky District of Arkhangelsk Oblast, Russia.

== History ==
It was founded as a railway station, located 823 kilometers (511 mi) from Moscow, during the building of the Vologda–Arkhangelsk railway at the end of the 19th century, and was named after the village of Shozhma (alternatively knows as Kondratovskaya), located approximately 14 kilometers (8.7 mi) to the east, on the shore of the Shozhma River.

A prison was established in Shozhma prior to World War II, which existed until 1985. Prisoners were involved in wood production. In 1940–1941, deported people were moved to Shozhma, in particular from the Ukrainian and Estonian SSRs.

Forestry and wood production were dominant in Shozhma during Soviet times. After the dissolution of the Soviet Union, wood production volumes went down considerably and the production nearly stopped at the end of the 20th century, leading to the decline of the local 750 mm (2 ft 5 1/2 in) narrow-gauge railway, which is the only connection with outside world.
