= Aleksey Chapygin =

Russian novelist (1870–1937)

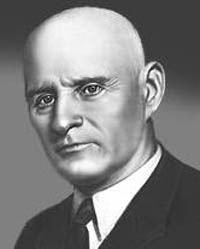
- Born: October 17, 1870; Kargopolsky Uyezd, Olonets Governorate, Russian Empire
- Died: October 21, 1937 (aged 67); Leningrad, USSR

Aleksey Pavlovich Chapygin (Russian: Алексе́й Па́влович Чапы́гин; 17 October [O.S. 5 October] 1870 – 21 October 1937) was a Russian writer, and one of the founders of the Soviet historical novel.

== Biography ==
Chapygin was born in Kargopolsky Uyezd, Olonets Governorate. His northern peasant origins are reflected in his works. His first book of stories, Those Who Keep Aloof, and his novel The White Hermitage, describing northern life, were published before the Russian Revolution of 1917. He is best known for his two novels about peasant uprisings in the 17th century, Itinerant Folk (1934–37) and Stepan Razin (1926–27). Stepan Razin is considered a classic of Soviet literature.

Chapygin drew upon Russian folklore for both the style of Stepan Razin and the positive and romanticized portrait of Razin himself. The Soviets excused this modernization of history as a justifiable polemic against the negative portrayal of Razin in 19th-century Russian literature. Stepan Razin was published in the magazine Red Virgin Soil.

== English translations ==
- Stepan Razin, Hutchinson International Authors, Ltd., London, 1946.
