= Gavrilovskaya, Kargopolsky District, Arkhangelsk Oblast =

Gavrilovskaya Гавриловская
- Selo
- Location within Arkhangelsk Oblast Location within Russia
- Coordinates: 61°33′N 38°20′E
- Country: Russia
- Region: Arkhangelsk Oblast
- District: Kargopolsky District
- Time zone: UTC+3:00

Gavrilovskaya (Russian: Гавриловская) is a rural locality (a selo) in Pechnikovskoye Rural Settlement of Kargopolsky District, Arkhangelsk Oblast, Russia. The population was 71 as of 2010.

== Geography ==
Gavrilovskaya is located 36 km west of Kargopol (the district's administrative centre) by road. Dudkinskaya is the nearest rural locality.
