= Shozhma (river) =

- Native name: Russian: Шожма, also Шежма or Шошма

Location
- Country: Russia

Physical characteristics
- Source
  - location: Lake Shozhma
- Mouth: Mosha
  - coordinates: 61.9641°N 40.6226°E
  - elevation: 73 m (240 ft)
- Length: 54 km (34 mi)
- Basin size: 140 km^{2} (54 sq mi)

Basin features
- Progression: Mosha→ Onega→ White Sea

The Shozma (Russian: Шожма) is a river in Nyandomsky District of Arkhangelsk Oblast in Russia. It is a left tributary of the Mosha. It is 54 kilometres (34 mi) long.

The river flows out of Lake Big Shozhma (Russian: Bolshoye Shozmozero), crosses the Arkhangelsk-Moscow railway near the village of Shipakhovsky and crosses the village, then flows to the north up to village of Shozhma, which is on the left bank, there it turns to the east. The Shozhma flows in the general direction of the north-east. Another settlement on the river banks was the village of Kondratovskaya (with historical name the "Village of Shozhma" (Russian: derevnya Shozhma) in the middle course of the river. Kondratovskaya is now deserted.
