= Svid =

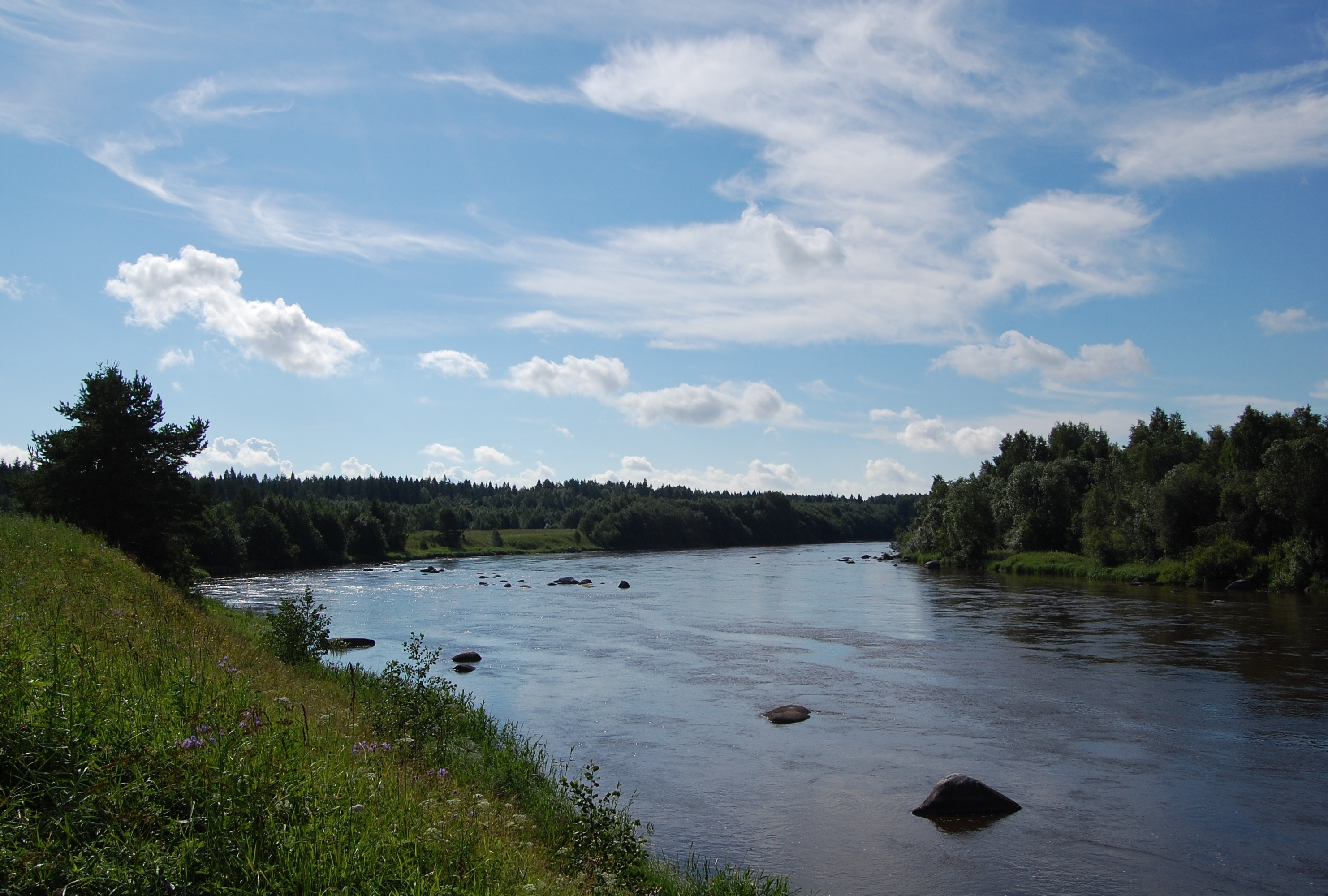
- Native name: Свидь (Russian)

Location
- Country: Russia

Physical characteristics
- Source
  - location: Lake Vozhe
  - elevation: 120 m (390 ft)
- Mouth: Lake Lacha
  - coordinates: 61°11′25″N 38°44′33″E
  - elevation: 117 m (384 ft)
- Length: 64 km (40 mi)
- Basin size: 6,850 km^{2} (2,640 sq mi)

Basin features
- Progression: Lake Lacha→ Onega→ White Sea

The Onega basin. The Svid is shown on the map.

The Svid (Russian: Свидь) is a river in Kargopolsky District in the south-west of Arkhangelsk Oblast in Russia. It connects Lake Vozhe and Lake Lacha and belongs to the river basin of the Onega. It is 64 kilometres (40 mi) long, and the area of its basin 6,850 square kilometres (2,640 sq mi).

The Svid is part of a major waterway from the Vozhega via Lakes Vozhe and Lacha to the Onega River, one of the biggest river basins of the White Sea.

Its source is the Lake Vozhe at the border of Vologda Oblast. The Svid flows from Lake Vozhe to the north, through a very sparsely populated landscape. In its upper course the river is between 40 metres (130 ft) and 120 metres (390 ft) wide, and flows between boggy and wooded banks. In the middle part of the river the banks becomes more rocky, and the river forms many small rapids. Here the river narrows to 10 to 15 metres (33 to 49 ft) and flows faster, and the banks are higher and steeper. In its lower reaches the river slows again, and the bank becomes low and marshy. The Svid empties into the southern end of Lake Lacha, which drains through the Onega towards the White Sea.

The Svid below the rapids (downstream from the village of Gorka) is navigable, though there is no regular passenger navigation.
