= Shalakusha =

Shalakusha Шалакуша
- Settlement
- Location within Arkhangelsk Oblast Location within Russia
- Coordinates: 62°13′N 40°15′E
- Country: Russia
- Region: Arkhangelsk Oblast
- District: Nyandomsky District
- Time zone: UTC+3:00

Shalakusha (Russian: Шалакуша) is a rural locality (a settlement) in Nyandomsky District, Arkhangelsk Oblast, Russia. The population was 2,236 as of 2010. There are 42 streets.

== Geography ==
Shalakusha is located on the Moshe River, 136 km north of Nyandoma (the district's administrative centre) by road.
