= Lake Vozhe =

Lake in Vologda, Russia

Lake Vozhe Воже
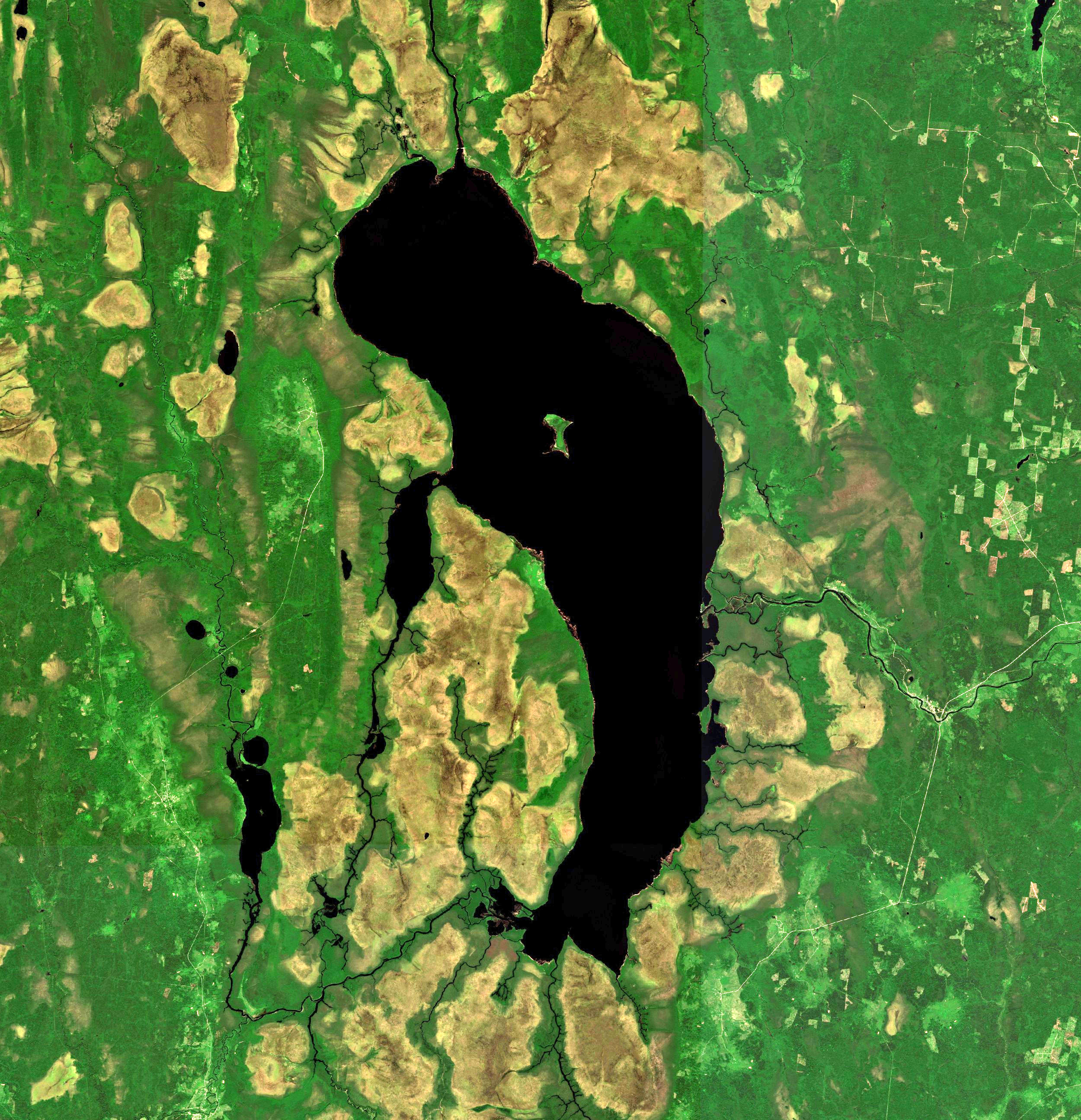
- Sentinel-2 image (2022)

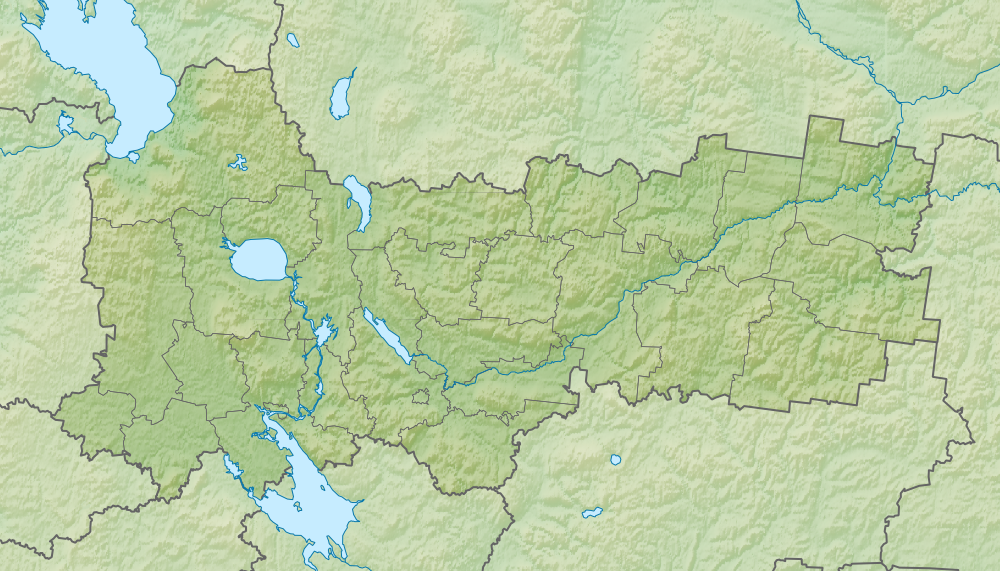
- Location within Russia Location within Vologda Oblast
- Location: Vologda Oblast
- Coordinates: 60°37′03″N 39°05′55″E
- Primary inflows: Vozhega, Modlona, Sovza
- Primary outflows: Svid
- Catchment area: 6,260 square kilometres (2,420 mi^{2})
- Basin countries: Russia
- Surface area: 416 square kilometres (161 mi^{2})
- Average depth: 2 metres (6.6 ft)
- Max. depth: 4.5 metres (15 ft)
- Surface elevation: 120 m (394 ft)
- Frozen: October/November - May

The Onega River basin. Lake Vozhe is shown.

Lake Vozhe, also known as Lake Charondskoye (Russian: Воже, Чарондское), is a lake in the northern part of Vologda Oblast in Russia. The area of the lake is 416 square kilometres (161 mi^{2}), and the area of its basin is 6,260 square kilometres (2,420 mi^{2}). The average depth is around 2 metres (6.6 ft) (maximum depth is 4.5 metres (15 ft)). Lake Vozhe drains through the Svid into Lake Lacha, from which the Onega flows out. The lake is located on a flatland and its shores are low-lying, waterlogged, and peaty. The biggest bog of the area, the Charonda Bog, is located to the southeast of the lake. Around twenty rivers flow into Lake Vozhe, including the Vozhega and the Modlona. The lake freezes up in October - November (some parts freeze to the very bottom) and stays icebound until May.

Administratively, the lake is divided between Kirillovsky District (west) and Vozhegodsky District (east) of Vologda Oblast. The northern shore belongs to Kargopolsky and Konoshsky District of Arkhangelsk Oblast, but the boundary between the oblasts is drawn such that the whole area of the lake is in Vologda Oblast. In terms of the area, Lake Vozhe is the third natural lake of Vologda Oblast (behind Lake Onega and Lake Beloye and just ahead of Lake Kubenskoye) and the fourth lake (also behind the Rybinsk Reservoir).

Historically, Lake Vozhe was on the trading route connecting the basings of the Volga and the Onega via the Sheksna.

There is one big island on the lake, Spassky Island. On the island, ruins of the former monastery are located.

The only inhabited locality on the lakeshore is the village of Charonda which is a former trading settlement founded in the 13th century, currently blocked off by a huge bog, having the population under 10 people, and almost deserted. Charonda does not have all-seasonal land connections. Formerly, the village of Vasilyevskaya was located on the northern lakeshore. It had a railway station, Svid station, on the railway connecting the settlement of Yertsevo and the village of Sovza, located west of the lake. In Sovza, a number of prison camps were operating, and the railroad was used to transport timber. In 2006, the prison camps were closed, Sovza was abolished, and the railway was demolished. The village of Vasilyevskaya currently has no permanent population.
