= Kiprovo, Arkhangelsk Oblast =

Kiprovo Кипрово
- Village
- Location within Arkhangelsk Oblast Location within Russia
- Coordinates: 61°33′N 38°55′E
- Country: Russia
- Region: Arkhangelsk Oblast
- District: Kargopolsky District
- Time zone: UTC+3:00

Kiprovo (Russian: Кипрово) is a rural locality (a village) in Kargopolsky District, Arkhangelsk Oblast, Russia. The population was 206 as of 2010. There are 7 streets.

== Geography ==
Kiprovo is located 6 km north of Kargopol (the district's administrative centre) by road. Zalyazhye is the nearest rural locality.
