= Kadnikovsky =

Kadnikovsky Кадниковский
- Village
- Location within Vologda Oblast Location within Russia
- Coordinates: 60°19′N 40°15′E
- Country: Russia
- Region: Vologda Oblast
- District: Vozhegodsky District
- Time zone: UTC+3:00

Kadnikovsky (Russian: Кадниковский) is a rural locality (a village) and the administrative center of Kadnikovskoye Rural Settlement, Vozhegodsky District, Vologda Oblast, Russia. The population was 2,250 as of 2002. There are 24 streets.

== Geography ==
Kadnikovsky is located 20 km south of Vozhega (the district's administrative centre) by road. Kholuy is the nearest rural locality.
