= Kargopol toys =

Russian clay figurines

Kargopol toys (Russian: Каргопольская игрушка) are moulded painted clay figures of people and animals. It is one of the old Russian folk art handicrafts, which is produced in and around the town of Kargopol, Arkhangelsk Oblast, in the north of Russia. It started in the 19th century in the areas west of Kargopol. The potters were not professionals, but just peasants who made toys in their spare time. A notable toy-maker in the beginning of the 20th century was Ivan Druzhinin (1887-1949). The handicraft almost became extinct in the 1930s. In the 1950s, only one artist, Ulyana Babkina (1889-1977), was making the toys. Eventually, Babkina's toys received all-Russian recognition, were noticed by the Russian Artist Union, and the handicraft was revived.

Bright colors (white, red, yellow, black) are typically used, in contrast to the old masters, who used the colored clay and produced toys in rather reserved colors.

Kargopol toys are typically single characters, and very rarely represent a group of two or three characters. The front of a toy gets more decoration, and the toys are thus oriented to the front view.

A singular character of Kagopol toys is a Polkan which is a combination of a human and a horse.
