= Niz, Kaduysky District, Vologda Oblast =

Niz Низ
- Village
- Location within Vologda Oblast Location within Russia
- Coordinates: 59°05′N 37°07′E
- Country: Russia
- Region: Vologda Oblast
- District: Kaduysky District
- Time zone: UTC+3:00

Niz (Russian: Низ) is a rural locality (a village) in Semizerye Rural Settlement, Kaduysky District, Vologda Oblast, Russia. The population was 6 as of 2002.

== Geography ==
Niz is located 14 km southwest of Kaduy (the district's administrative centre) by road. Korninskaya is the nearest rural locality.
