= Lake Lacha =

Lake in Arkhangelsk Oblast, Russia

Lake Lacha Лача
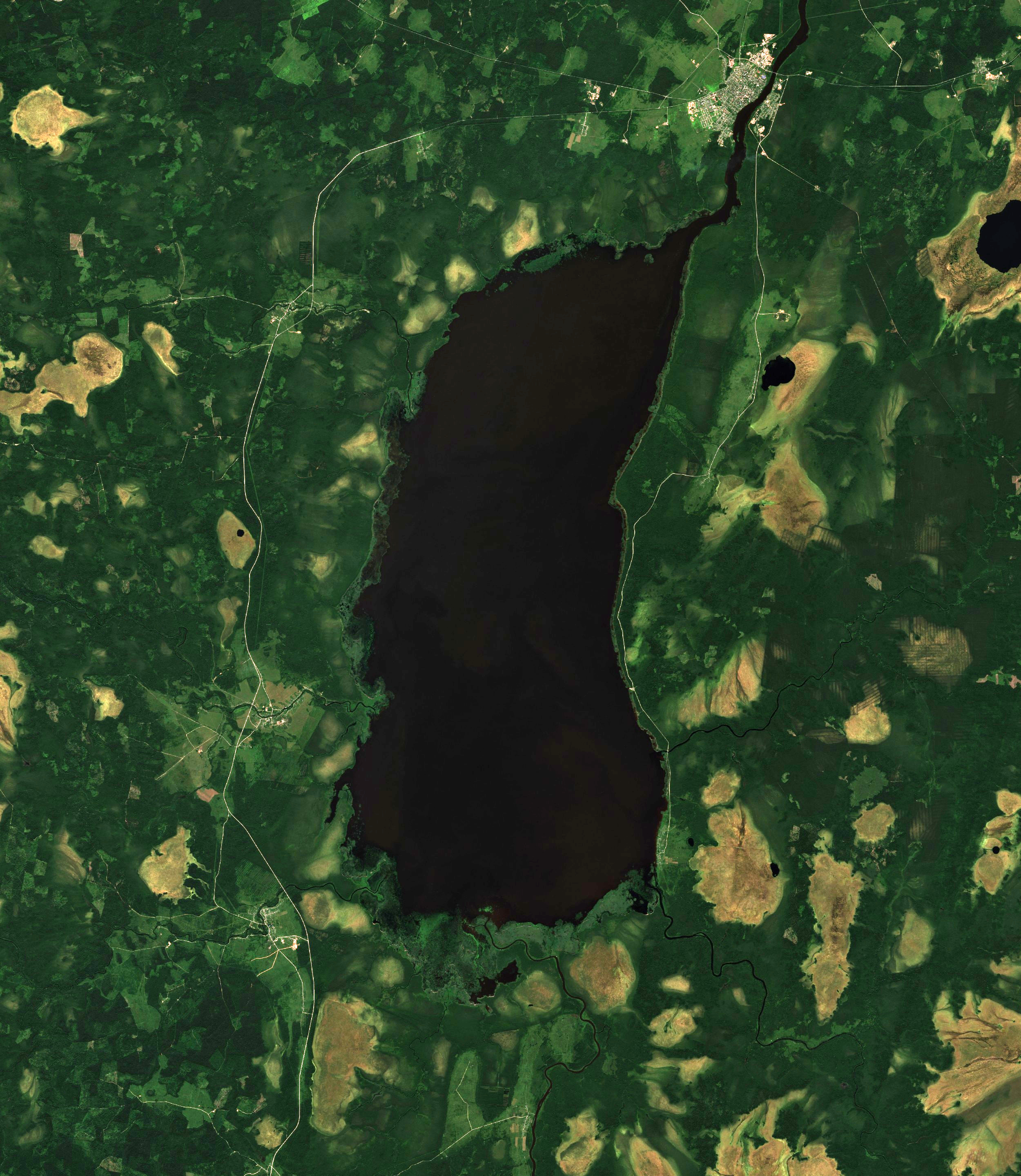
- Sentinel-2 image (2018)

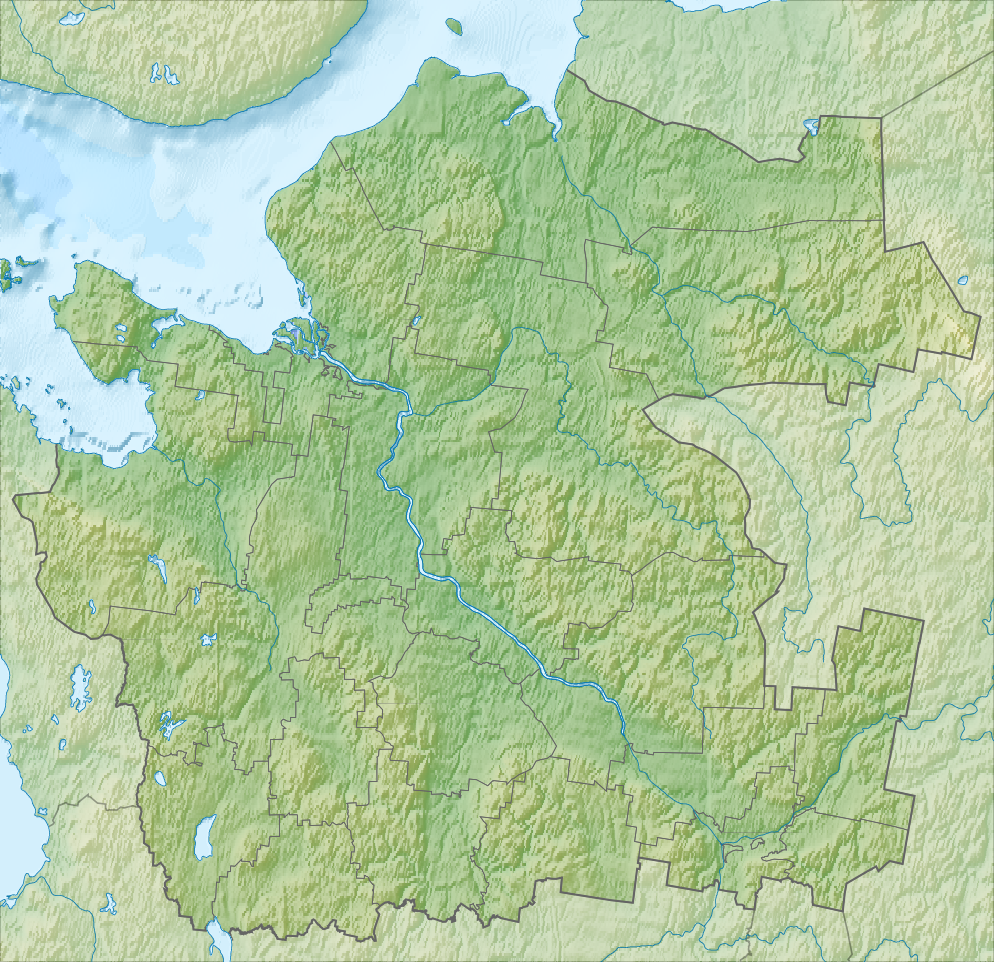
- Location within Arkhangelsk Oblast
- Location: Arkhangelsk Oblast
- Coordinates: 61°19′40″N 38°45′53″E
- Type: Natural freshwater lake
- Primary inflows: Svid, Lyokshma
- Primary outflows: Onega
- Catchment area: 12,600 square kilometres (4,900 mi^{2})
- Basin countries: Russia
- Max. length: 36 km (22 mi)
- Max. width: 14.22 km (8.84 mi)
- Surface area: 334 square kilometres (129 mi^{2})
- Surface elevation: 117 m (384 ft)
- Islands: A number of islands and islets

The Onega River basin. Lake Lacha is shown.

Lake Lacha (Russian: Ла́ча, Ла́че) is a freshwater lake, located in the south of Kargopolsky District of Arkhangelsk Oblast in Russia, 7 kilometres (4.3 mi) south of the town of Kargopol. It is the largest lake in Arkhangelsk Oblast, with a surface area of 334 square kilometres (129 mi^{2}) and a basin area of 12,600 square kilometres (4,900 mi^{2}). Lake Lacha is the source of the Onega, one of the major waterways of the White Sea basin.

The etymological origin of the name is unclear.

The river basin of Lake Lacha includes the southern and western parts of Kargopolsky District of Arkhangelsk Oblast, as well as north-west of Vologda Oblast. In particular, it includes two of the biggest lakes of Arkhangelsk and Vologda Oblasts, Lake Vozhe and Lake Lyokshmozero. The southern part of the Kenozersky National Park also drains into Lake Lacha.

The stretch between Kargopol and the lake is navigable, however, neither the Svid upstream from the lake nor the Onega downstream are navigable because of the rapids. There are occasional recreational boat trips from Kargopol to the lake but no passenger or cargo navigation.

Several villages are located on or close to the banks, including Morshchikhinskaya, Tobolkino, and Filosofskaya. The latter pair are located on the road connecting Kargopol with Lipin Bor via Sovza. Another unpaved road runs from Kargopol along the right bank of the Onega to the lake and then to the village of Bolshaya Kondratovskaya, several kilometers from the lakeshore.
