= Zazhigino, Arkhangelsk Oblast =

Zazhigino Зажигино
- Village
- Location within Arkhangelsk Oblast Location within Russia
- Coordinates: 61°31′N 38°55′E
- Country: Russia
- Region: Arkhangelsk Oblast
- District: Kargopolsky District
- Time zone: UTC+3:00

Zazhigino (Russian: Зажигино) is a rural locality (a village) in Kargopolskoye Rural Settlement of Kargopolsky District, Arkhangelsk Oblast, Russia. The population was 7 as of 2010. There is 1 street.

== Geography ==
Zazhigino is located 2 km north of Kargopol (the district's administrative centre) by road . Kargopol is the nearest rural locality.
