= Niz, Oshevensky Selsoviet, Kargopolsky District, Arkhangelsk Oblast =

Niz Низ
- Village
- Location within Arkhangelsk Oblast Location within Russia
- Coordinates: 61°53′N 38°45′E
- Country: Russia
- Region: Arkhangelsk Oblast
- District: Kargopolsky District
- Time zone: UTC+3:00

Niz (Russian: Низ) is a rural locality (a village) in Kargopolsky District, Arkhangelsk Oblast, Russia. The population was 122 as of 2010.
