= Fedovo =

Fedovo (Russian: Федово) is the name of several rural localities in Russia:

- Fedovo, Arkhangelsk Oblast, a selo in Fedovsky Selsoviet of Plesetsky District of Arkhangelsk Oblast
- Fedovo, Borovichsky District, Novgorod Oblast, a village in Konchansko-Suvorovskoye Settlement of Borovichsky District of Novgorod Oblast
- Fedovo, Okhonskoye Settlement, Pestovsky District, Novgorod Oblast, a village in Okhonskoye Settlement of Pestovsky District of Novgorod Oblast
- Fedovo, Vyatskoye Settlement, Pestovsky District, Novgorod Oblast, a village in Vyatskoye Settlement of Pestovsky District of Novgorod Oblast
- Fedovo, Bezhanitsky District, Pskov Oblast, a village in Bezhanitsky District, Pskov Oblast
- Fedovo, Gdovsky District, Pskov Oblast, a village in Gdovsky District, Pskov Oblast
- Fedovo (Slavkovskaya Rural Settlement), Porkhovsky District, Pskov Oblast, a village in Porkhovsky District, Pskov Oblast; municipally, a part of Slavkovskaya Rural Settlement of that district
- Fedovo (Dubrovenskaya Rural Settlement), Porkhovsky District, Pskov Oblast, a village in Porkhovsky District, Pskov Oblast; municipally, a part of Dubrovenskaya Rural Settlement of that district
- Fedovo, Kesovogorsky District, Tver Oblast, a village in Kesovogorsky District, Tver Oblast
- Fedovo, Likhoslavlsky District, Tver Oblast, a village in Likhoslavlsky District, Tver Oblast
- Fedovo, Vesyegonsky District, Tver Oblast, a village in Vesyegonsky District, Tver Oblast
- Fedovo (Zelenogorskoye Rural Settlement), Vyshnevolotsky District, Tver Oblast, a village in Vyshnevolotsky District, Tver Oblast; municipally, a part of Zelenogorskoye Rural Settlement of that district
- Fedovo (Kolomenskoye Rural Settlement), Vyshnevolotsky District, Tver Oblast, a village in Vyshnevolotsky District, Tver Oblast; municipally, a part of Kolomenskoye Rural Settlement of that district
