= Kargopolsky Uyezd =

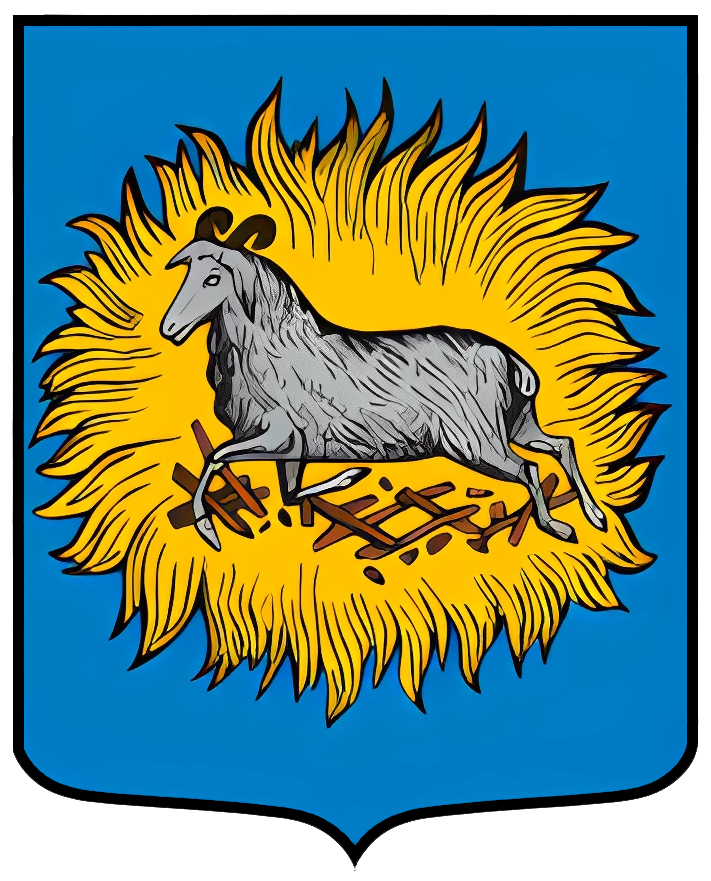
Kargopol (Arkhangelsk oblast), Coat of Arms

Kargopolsky Uyezd (Каргопольский уезд) was one of the subdivisions of the Olonets Governorate of the Russian Empire. It was situated in the eastern part of the governorate. Its administrative centre was Kargopol. The territory of the uyezd is now part of the Kargopolsky, Nyandomsky and Plesetsky districts of Arkhangelsk Oblast.

== Demographics ==
At the time of the Russian Empire Census of 1897, Kargopolsky Uyezd had a population of 82,347. Of these, 99.8% spoke Russian and 0.1% Polish as their native language.
