= Nyandoma =

Town in Arkhangelsk Oblast, Russia

Nyandoma Няндома
- Town
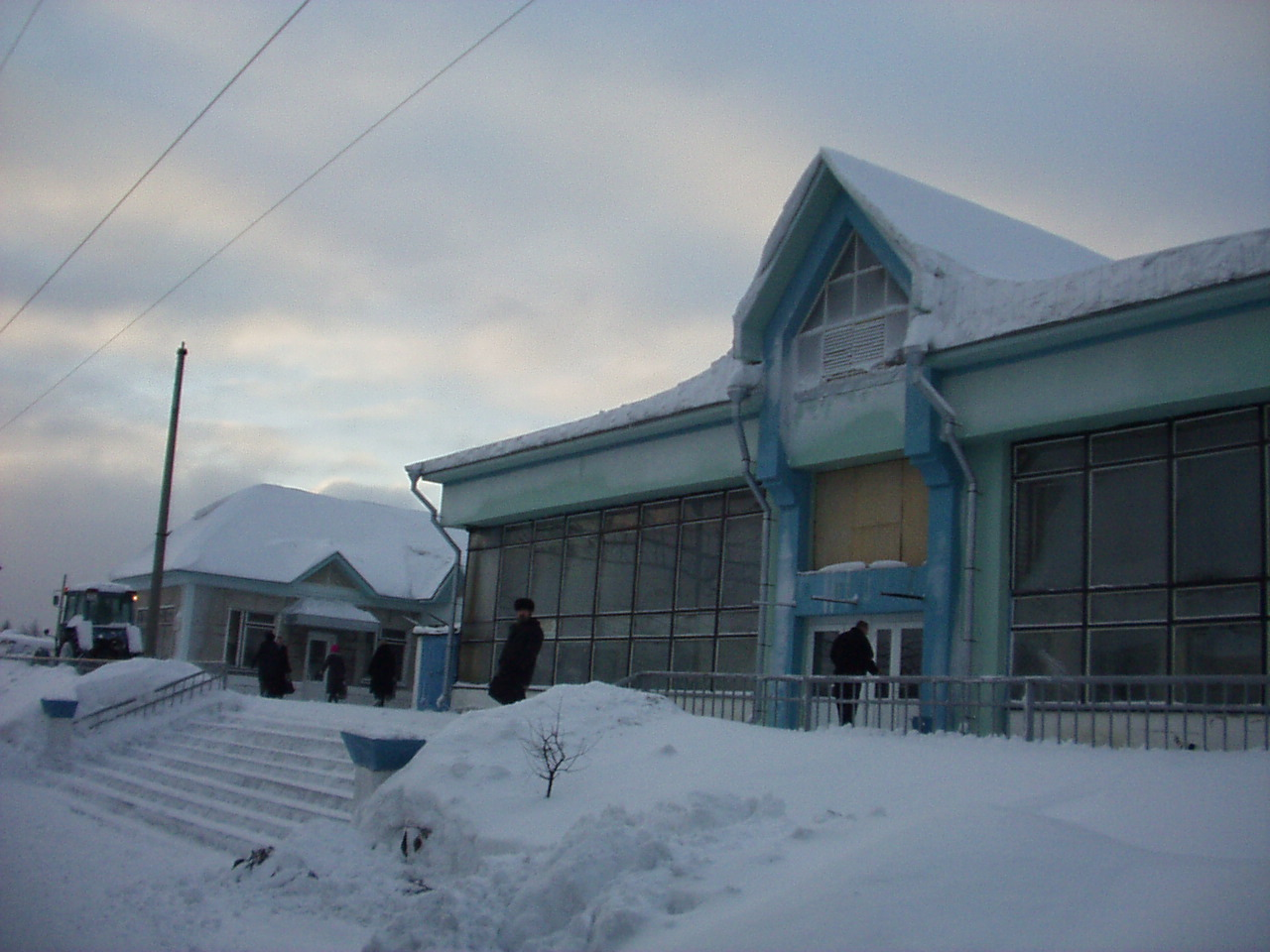
- Nyandoma railway station

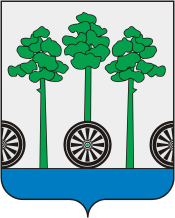
- Coat of arms
- Interactive map of Nyandoma
- Location of Nyandoma Nyandoma (Arkhangelsk Oblast)
- Coordinates: 61°40′N 40°13′E
- Country: Russia
- Federal subject: Arkhangelsk Oblast
- Administrative district: Nyandomsky District
- Town of district significanceSelsoviet: Nyandoma
- Founded: 1896
- Town status since: 1939
- Elevation: 220 m (720 ft)

Population (2010 Census)
  - Total: 22,356
  - Estimate (2023): 18,146 (−18.8%)

Administrative status
  - Capital of: Nyandomsky District, town of district significance of Nyandoma

Municipal status
  - Municipal district: Nyandomsky Municipal District
  - Urban settlement: Nyandomskoye Urban Settlement
  - Capital of: Nyandomsky Municipal District, Nyandomskoye Urban Settlement
- Time zone: UTC+3 (MSK)
- Postal code: 164200
- OKTMO ID: 11644101001
- Website: nyandomamo.ru

Nyandoma (Russian: Ня́ндома Russian: [ˈnʲanˌdoːmə]) is a town and the administrative center of Nyandomsky District in Arkhangelsk Oblast, Russia, located 347 kilometers (216 mi) south of Arkhangelsk, the administrative center of the oblast. Population: 22,356 (2010 census); 22,619 (2002 census); 24,826 (1989 Soviet census).

== History ==
Nyandoma was founded in 1896 as a settlement around the railway station Nyandoma on the newly constructed railway between Vologda and Arkhangelsk. The railway traffic was open in 1898. At the time, Nyandoma was a part of Kargopolsky Uyezd of Olonets Governorate. On July 15, 1929, the uyezds were abolished, the governorates merged into Northern Krai, and Nyandomsky District was established among others. It became a part of Nyandoma Okrug, one of the five in Northern Krai. Nyandoma served as the administrative center of Nyandoma Okrug. In 1930, the okrug was abolished, and the district was subordinated to the central administration of Northern Krai. In 1936, the krai itself was transformed into Northern Oblast. In 1937, Northern Oblast was split into Arkhangelsk Oblast and Vologda Oblast, with Nyandoma being transferred to Arkhangelsk Oblast. The settlement was granted town status in 1939.

== Administrative and municipal status ==
Within the framework of administrative divisions, Nyandoma serves as the administrative center of Nyandomsky District. As an administrative division, it is, together with three rural localities, incorporated within Nyandomsky District as the town of district significance of Nyandoma. As a municipal division, the town of district significance of Nyandoma, together with the territories of Andreyevsky, Burachikhinsky, and Shozhemsky Selsoviets (which comprise, correspondingly, nine, five, and one rural localities, for the total of fifteen rural localities) in Nyandomsky District, are incorporated within Nyandomsky Municipal District as Nyandomskoye Urban Settlement.

== Population ==
As of 1 January 2021, the city was ranked 684th out of 1116 cities in the Russian Federation in terms of population.

Since 1999, Nyandoma's population has been decreasing. Mainly due to migration to the nearest large cities (Arkhangelsk, St. Petersburg, Vologda, Yaroslavl, etc.) and a low standard of living. The absolute majority of the population are Russians (northern Russians), or rather representatives or descendants of representatives of local groups of northerners that exist on the territory of Nyandoma district (Nyamenzhans (Nimenskaya/Andreevskaya volost/selsoviet), Moshaks (Mosha village), Kanakshans (Kanaksha village), Antashints (Antashikha village), Vozerets (Vozero village) and others) who moved to or were born in Nyandoma.

== The Nyandoma dialect ==
The indigenous population of the town are native speakers of the Northern Russian dialect. The Nyandoma dialect belongs to the Vologda group of accents.

The following features of the accent: okan'e, frequent use of the particle "dak" (don't, dak), the particle "that" (where to run?, what to do?), repetition of the particle "yes" (sit yes, lie yes), etc.

== The Nyandoma coat of arms ==
The Coat of Arms of Nyandomskoye Municipality was approved by Decision of the Municipal Council of Nyandomskoye Municipality No. 34 of April 27, 2006, and was registered in the State Heraldic Register under No. 2310.

"In a silver field on an azure (blue, blue) narrow tip (foot) are three green pines, of which the middle one is higher and on top of it at the bottom is a black, decorated with silver, wheel; accompanied on the sides by two similar wheels, half emerging from the edges and standing on the tip".

== Telecommunications and media ==
The Avangard newspaper (until 1965 the Lesnoy Rabochiy), published since December 15, 1929, is the main newspaper of the town and the district. It comes out once a week (Thursday). The town also publishes an ad newspaper, The Merchant. The advertising agency Rakurs (Racurs 29) also publishes a new information and advertising newspaper.

Newspapers are published by Nyandomskiy Railway College ("Youth Forum"), School No. 2 ("CoolSchool"), School No. 6 ("Rovesnik"), School No. 7 ("Tochka nad i").

Wired internet is available in most of the town; the providers are Rostelecom and the local Nyandoma Broadcasting Company Ltd., which also provides cable TV and city local network services.

Satellite Internet is also available in a large part of the town, as well as satellite TV (Tricolor, NTV-Plus, MTS TV, Telekarta).

The following TV channels are available within the city: First Channel, Russia 1 / GTRK Pomorye, NTV, Fifth Channel, Russia K. Radio stations: "Radio of Russia" / "Radio Pomorye" (101.5 FM), "Dorozhnoe Radio" (102.7 FM), "Europe Plus" (103.9 FM).

On January 1, 2019, Nyandoma and the Nyandoma district switched from analogue to digital television.

Cellular operators: Beeline, MegaFon, MTS, Tele2, Yota, Satellite Communications, Trunking.

== Economy ==
There are railway transport companies and a large number of timber industry companies operating in the town.

The Nyandoma locomotive depot is a large and important enterprise for the district, the region and the country. And it might even bear the status of a city-forming enterprise. In 2016, Nyandoma celebrated its 100th anniversary. Locomotives and electric locomotives from the entire Northern Railway undergo maintenance and repair at the enterprise; the depot is the largest employer in the town and the district, as well as the largest taxpayer to the district budget. In 2009, due to the reorganisation of the locomotive facilities of Russian Railways, the locomotive depot was split into the operational locomotive depot TChE-13 Nyandoma and the locomotive repair depot TChR-35 Nyandoma-Severnaya.

Nyandoma is located on an asphalt road connecting Dolmatovo to Kargopol. This road also provides access to one of the main highways in Russia, the M8, which connects Moscow and Arkhangelsk. Another paved road, to the south, connects Nyandoma with Konosha.

Nyandoma-Broiler poultry farm's products had markets throughout the Arkhangelsk region and beyond some of its borders. Before bankruptcy, a large part of the town's population worked for the enterprise.

The town has a military commissariat for the Nyandoma, Kargopolsky and Konoshsky districts of the Arkhangelsk region.

The following banks are located in Nyandoma: "Moscow Credit Bank", "Home Credit and Finance Bank", "Severgazbank", "Sberbank Rossii", "Post Bank", "Rosselkhozbank", "OTP Bank".

Hotels: "Gostiny Dom", "Hotel on Pervomayskaya", "Sputnik Hotel", "Rostov Hotel", "Hotel on Sovetskaya", "Meat Factory Hotel", "Long stay rooms (LTC) at Nyandoma station".

Microfinance organizations: "Association of credit consumer cooperatives Nyandoma-credit", "Centrofinance", "Cashbox of mutual aid", "Cash assistance centre", "CarMoney service point", "Rostfinance", "Financial oasis", "Association of credit consumer cooperatives <Ilma>".

Taxi services: Yandex.Taxi, City Taxi Service, Taxi USSR, Taxi Gepard, Taxi Sprint, Taxi for You, Taxi Maxi-round, Taxi Express-Lux.

== Culture and recreation ==
There are several cultural institutions in Nyandoma, e.g.:

- Nyandoma District Library (open since 1935)
- Nyandoma House Museum
- Regional Centre for Supplementary Education (before January 1, 2012, it was called Children's and Youth Centre)
- Nyandomskiy Rayon Center of Culture and Sports (has been operating since 1986)
- DK "Zarya" (construction department of MBUK "NRCS")

A paper collection of poems and songs has been published, which includes an anthem for the town of Nyandoma. The author of the poems is Natalia Isaeva, a member of the International Union of Writers "Novy Sovremennik", a native and resident of Moscow. This city is associated with the poet's childhood memories, whose childhood was spent in Nyandoma. The title of the work is "Hymn to the town of my childhood - Nyandoma". In her explanations, the author talks about the amazing nature of the region and real life stories.

From time to time, local pop artists come to the town with concerts. Also, from time to time, a circus and a mobile zoo come to the town.

A documentary from the series "Letters from the province" (Culture TV channel) and a documentary from the series "Yekhal Greka..." have been filmed about the town (Culture TV channel). Canadian television made a film about the situation of coronavirus infection COVID-19 in Nyandoma.

== Science and education ==
Kindergartens

- Kindergarten No. 1 "Vasiljok"
- Kindergarten No. 2 "The Fairy Tale
- Kindergarten No. 2 "Skazka"
- Kindergarten No. 3 "Teremok"
- Kindergarten No. 4 "Ogonyok"
- Kindergarten No. 5 "Svetlyachok"
- Kindergarten No. 6 "Semitsvetik" («the former military camp» Kargopol-2 microdistrict)
- Kindergarten No. 7 "Solnyshko"
- Kindergarten No. 8 "Zvezdochka"
- Kindergarten No. 9 "Rodnichok"
- Kindergarten No. 10 "Ulybka"
- Kindergarten No. 11 "Golden Key"

Schools

- School No. 1 named after A.S. Pushkin (closed)
- Secondary General School No. 2
- Secondary General School No. 3 (opened in 1986)
- Secondary General School No. 4 («the former military camp» Kargopol-2 microdistrict)
- Comprehensive evening (shift) school Nr. 5 (opened in 1944)
- Secondary general school No. 6 (formerly No. 16, 31, FZS, Nyandoma Unified Labor School, two-class railway school, since 2018 a structural subdivision of SSH No. 3)
- Comprehensive secondary school No. 7 (formerly No. 31)
- Nyandomskaya Specialised Secondary School
- Nyandoma Special Education Institution («the former military camp» Kargopol-2 microdistrict)
- Children's Art School (opened on 30 August 2015)

Colleges and technical colleges

- Nyandoma railway college
- Nyandomskoe medical college (as part of the NZhK)
- Branch of the Modern Humanitarian Academy

Orphanages

- Nyandoma orphanage

== Health Care ==
- Nyandomskaya Central District Hospital. In 2009, Nyandomskaya Central District Hospital celebrated its 100th anniversary.
- Health centre of the Nyandomsk Central District Hospital.
- Children's polyclinic.
- RZD-Medicine state healthcare institution in Nyandoma
- The medical centre "Tonus Plus".

== Sports ==
In Nyandoma there are many sports sections: judo, hand-to-hand combat, football, boxing, SAMBO. Football tournaments are held between neighbourhood teams.

In summer a photo race is held in the town. In May the May Relay race is held.

Every year (since 2012) on 15 May, the city holds a citywide charging event.

== Landmarks ==
- Monument - steam locomotive Em-723-37.
- Church of Zosima and Savvaty of Solovetskiy.
- Monument - an obelisk to the soldiers who died during the Great Patriotic War.

== Climate ==
Climate data for Nyandoma
Month	Jan	Feb	Mar	Apr	May	Jun	Jul	Aug	Sep	Oct	Nov	Dec	Year
Daily mean °C (°F)	−13 (9)	−12 (10)	−6 (21)	1 (34)	8 (46)	14 (57)	16 (61)	14 (57)	8 (46)	1 (34)	−5 (23)	−10 (14)	1 (34)
Source: Weatherbase
