= Nyandomsky District =

Nyandomsky District Няндомский район (Russian)
- District
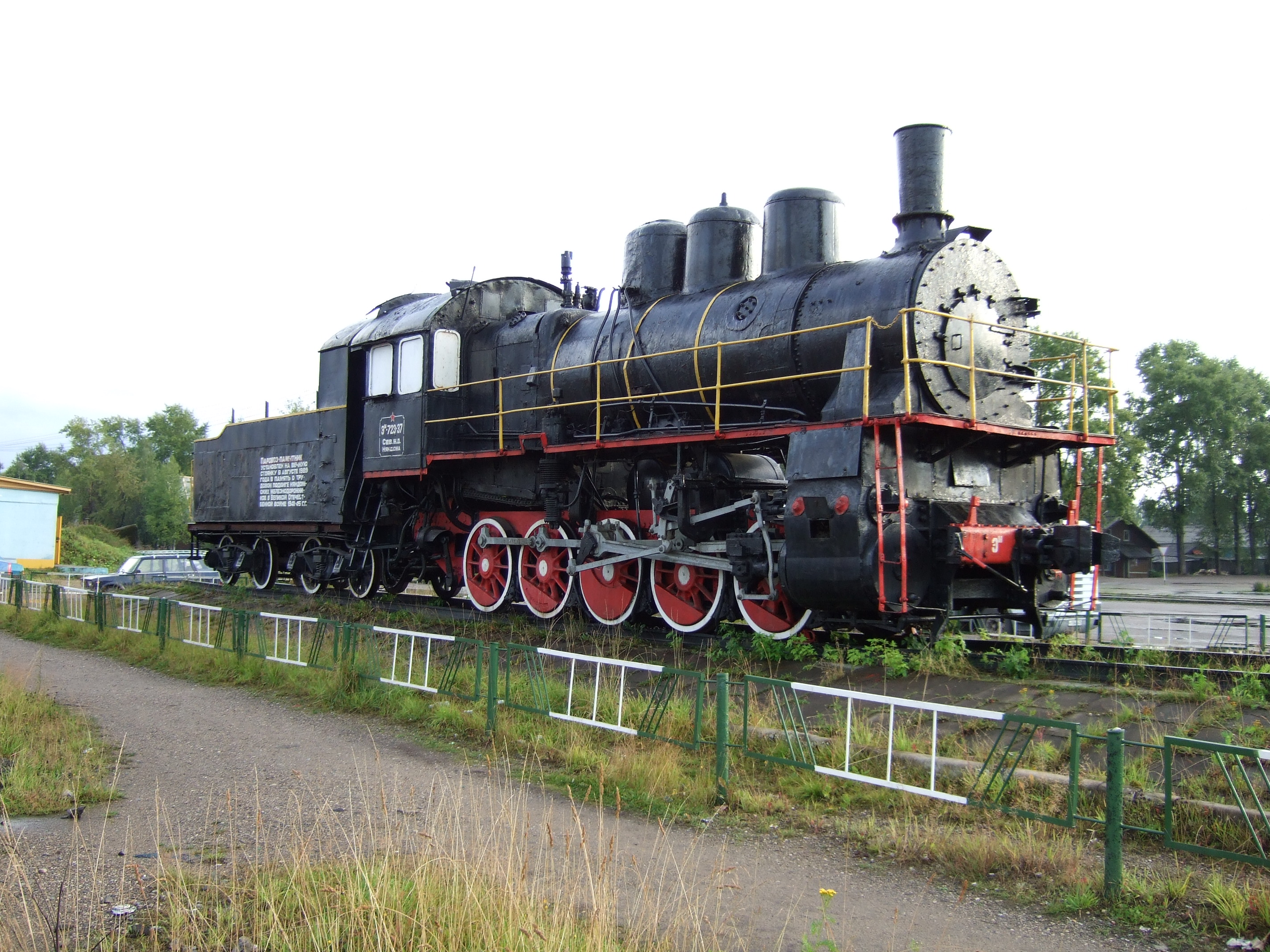
- Steam locomotive in Nyandoma, Nyandomsky District

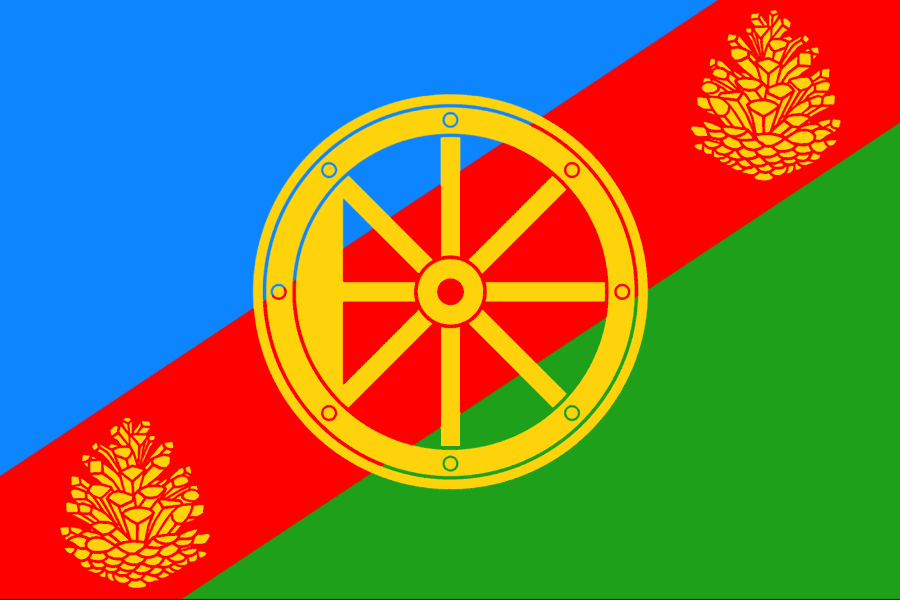
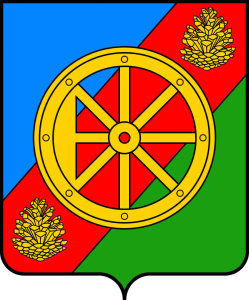
- Flag Coat of arms
- Location of Nyandomsky District in the Arkhangelsk Oblast
- Coordinates: 61°40′N 40°12′E
- Country: Russia
- Federal subject: Arkhangelsk Oblast
- Established: July 15, 1929
- Administrative center: Nyandoma

Area
  - Total: 8,100 km^{2} (3,100 sq mi)

Population (2010 Census)
  - Total: 30,244
  - Density: 3.7/km^{2} (9.7/sq mi)
  - Urban: 73.9%
  - Rural: 26.1%

Administrative structure
  - Administrative divisions: 1 Towns of district significance, 8 Selsoviets
  - Inhabited localities: 1 cities/towns, 156 rural localities

Municipal structure
  - Municipally incorporated as: Nyandomsky Municipal District
  - Municipal divisions: 1 urban settlements, 2 rural settlements
- Time zone: UTC+3 (MSK)
- OKTMO ID: 11544000
- Website: http://www.nyan-doma.ru/

Nyandomsky District (Russian: Ня́ндомский райо́н) is an administrative district (raion), one of the twenty-one in Arkhangelsk Oblast, Russia. As a municipal division, it is incorporated as Nyandomsky Municipal District. It is located in the southwest of the oblast and borders with Plesetsky District in the north and west, Shenkursky District in the east, Velsky District in the southeast, Konoshsky District in the south, and with Kargopolsky District in the southwest. The area of the district is 8,100 square kilometers (3,100 sq mi). Its administrative center is the town of Nyandoma. Population: 30,244 (2010 census); 33,465 (2002 census); 40,601 (1989 Soviet census). The population of Nyandoma accounts for 73.9% of the district's total population.

== History ==
The area was populated by speakers of Uralic languages and then colonized by the Novgorod Republic. It was always a remote part of Kargopol lands characterized by a sparse population. In the course of the administrative reform carried out in 1708 by Peter the Great, the area was included into Ingermanland Governorate (known from 1710 as Saint Petersburg Governorate). In 1727, it was transferred to the newly established Novgorod Governorate. After a number of administrative reforms, Kargopolsky Uyezd became one of the four uyezds of the newly established Olonets Governorate. In 1894, the decision was taken on the railroad construction from Vologda to Arkhangelsk. It was decided that the railroad must take the shortest route, which means it should bypass Kargopol and traverse the current territory of Nyandomsky District. In 1896, Nyandoma was founded as a railway station.

On July 15, 1929, the uyezds were abolished, the governorates merged into Northern Krai, and the Nyandomsky District was established. It became a part of Nyandoma Okrug, one of the five in Northern Krai. In 1930, the okrug was abolished, and the district was subordinated to the central administration of Northern Krai. A short time in the 1930s, the district absorbed some areas of the abolished Konoshsky District, but in 1935 Konoshsky District was reestablished, and the areas were transferred to it. In 1936, the krai itself was transformed into Northern Oblast. In 1937, Northern Oblast was split into Arkhangelsk Oblast and Vologda Oblast. Nyandomsky District remained in Arkhangelsk Oblast ever since.

== Geography ==
A major part of the district belongs to the basin of the Onega River. The Mosha River, a right tributary of the Onega, has the Lake Bolshoye Moshenskoye as its source. This lake is in the southeast of the district and flows northwest, dividing the district into two roughly equal parts. The areas in the west of the district are in the basin of the Voloshka River, also a right tributary of the Onega. Minor areas in the east of the district belong to the basins of the left tributaries of the Vaga River—the Vel, the Padenga, and the Led. An area in the north of the district belongs to the basin of the Mekhrenga River, a right tributary of the Yemtsa. There are many lakes in the district, the biggest one being Lake Nimengskoye, which belongs to the basin of the Voloshka River.

A major part of the district is covered by coniferous forests (taiga). There are many swamps in the area.

== Divisions ==
=== Administrative divisions ===
As an administrative division, the district is divided into eight selsoviets and one town of district significance (Nyandoma). One locality which previously had urban-type settlement status (Shalakusha), was downgraded to a rural locality in 2005. The following selsoviets have been established (the administrative centers are given in parentheses):

- Andreyevsky (Andreyevskaya);
- Burachikhinsky (Burachikhinskaya);
- Lepshinsky (Stupinskaya);
- Limsky (Navolok);
- Moshinsky (Makarovskaya);
- Shalakushsky (Shalakusha);
- Shozhemsky (Shestiozersky);
- Voyezersky (Gridino).

=== Municipal divisions ===
As a municipal division, the district is divided into one urban settlement and two rural settlements (the administrative centers are given in parentheses):

- Nyandomskoye Urban Settlement (Nyandoma);
- Moshinskoye Rural Settlement (Makarovskaya);
- Shalakushskoye Rural Settlement (Shalakusha).

== Economy ==
=== Industry ===
The most important industry in the district is timber industry. Food industry is also present

=== Agriculture ===
Agriculture in the region is limited mostly to milk and meat production.

=== Transportation ===
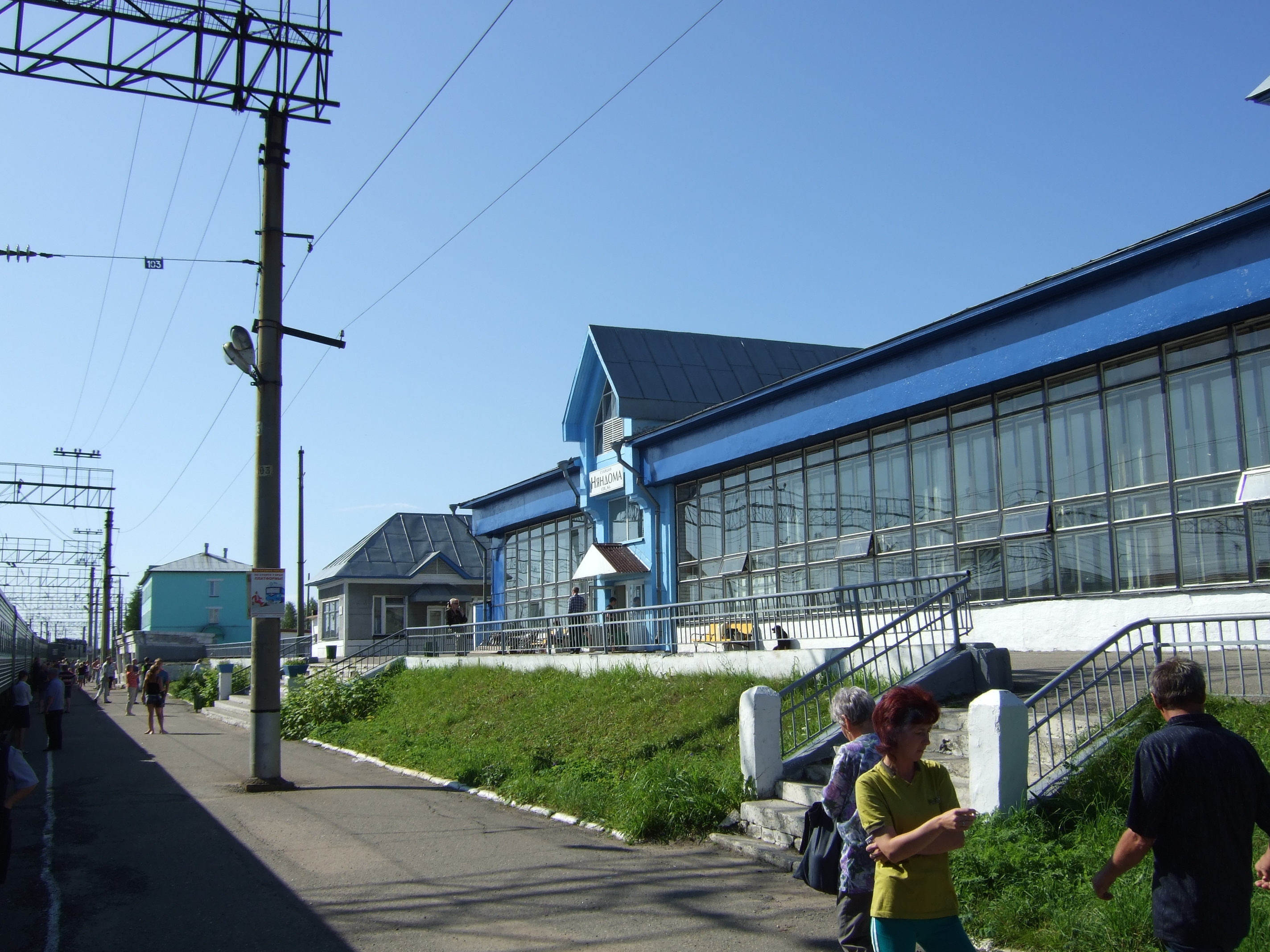
Nyandoma railway station

Nyandoma is on the paved road connecting Dolmatovo, which is on one of the principal highways in Russia, M8 connecting Moscow and Arkhangelsk, with Kargopol. Another paved road, in the southern direction, connects Nyandoma with Konosha.

Nyandoma is located on the railway line between Moscow and Arkhangelsk (built in the south-north direction), and as a matter of fact was founded in 1896 as a railway station and was only granted town status in 1939.

== Culture and recreation ==
The district contains thirty-one objects classified as cultural and historical heritage of local importance. Most of these are chapels and wooden rural houses built prior to 1917.

The only state museum in the district is the House of Nyan, in Nyandoma.
