= Kargopol =

Town in Arkhangelsk Oblast, Russia

Kargopol Каргополь
- Town
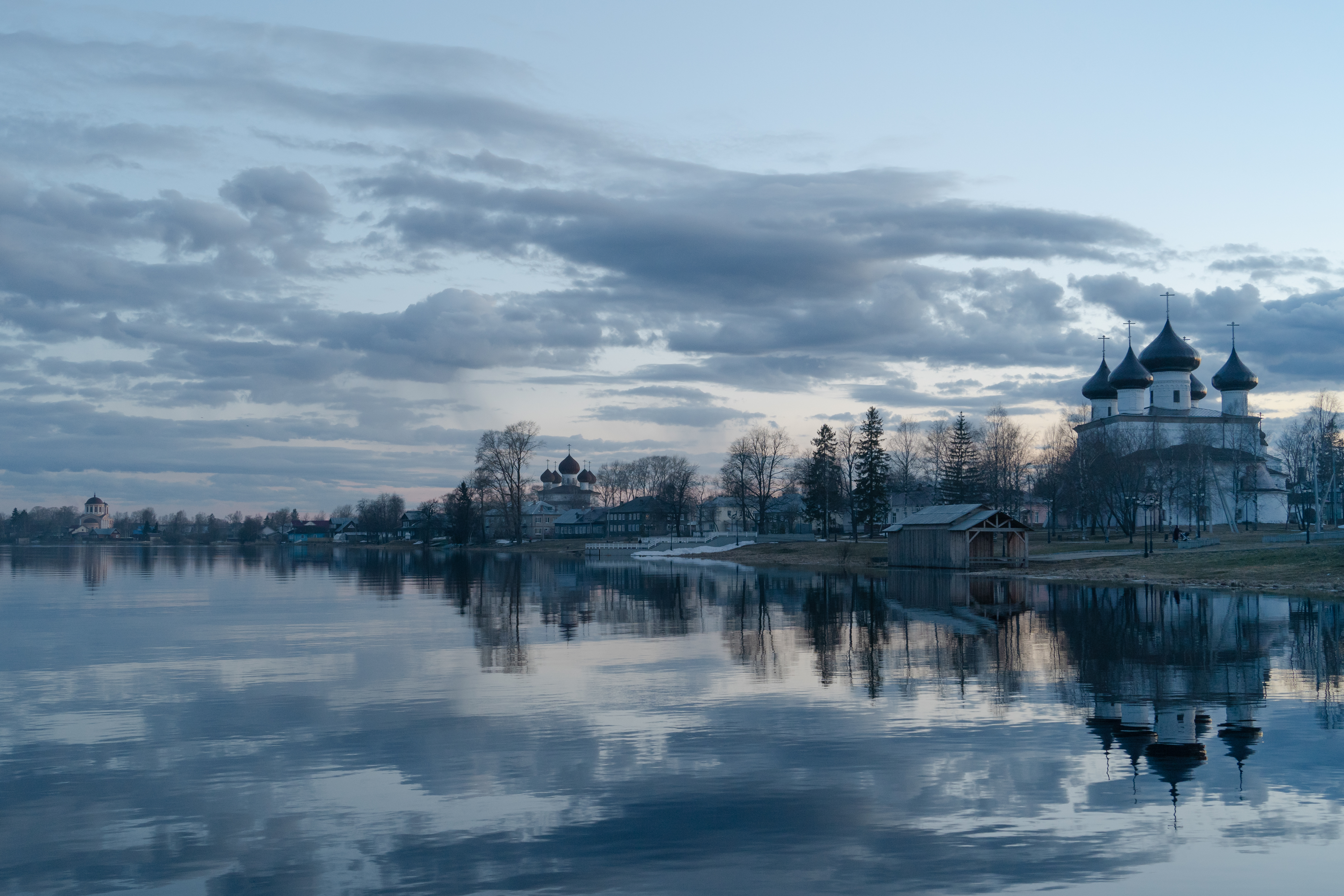

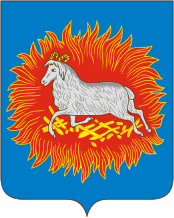
- Coat of arms
- Interactive map of Kargopol
- Location of Kargopol Kargopol (Arkhangelsk Oblast)
- Coordinates: 61°30′N 38°56′E
- Country: Russia
- Federal subject: Arkhangelsk Oblast
- Administrative district: Kargopolsky District
- Town of district significanceSelsoviet: Kargopol
- First mentioned: 1146
- Elevation: 120 m (390 ft)

Population (2010 Census)
  - Total: 10,214
  - Estimate (2023): 8,737 (−14.5%)

Administrative status
  - Capital of: Kargopolsky District, town of district significance of Kargopol

Municipal status
  - Municipal district: Kargopolsky Municipal District
  - Urban settlement: Kargopolskoye Urban Settlement
  - Capital of: Kargopolsky Municipal District, Kargopolskoye Urban Settlement
- Time zone: UTC+3 (MSK)
- Postal code: 164110
- OKTMO ID: 11618101001

Kargopol (Russian: Ка́ргополь) is a town and the administrative center of Kargopolsky District in Arkhangelsk Oblast, Russia, located on both sides of the Onega River, several miles north of Lake Lacha, in the southwestern corner of the oblast. Population: 10,025 (2021 census); 10,214 (2010 census); 11,192 (2002 census); 12,495 (1989 Soviet census).

== History ==
It is not clear when Kargopol was founded, but, when first chronicled in 1146, it was a trade station of the Novgorod Republic and one of the most northerly permanent Russian settlements. Although documentation for its early history is scarce, it is believed that Kargopol was the most significant trade center of Bjarmaland throughout the 13th and 14th centuries. In 1447, it was the place where Dmitry Shemyaka found refuge from Vasily II's ire.

Situated on the ancient route between Moscow and Arkhangelsk (then the only Russian seaport), Kargopol became one of the most prosperous cities of Russia, especially after the Muscovy Company started to operate in the mid-16th century. During the Time of Troubles it withstood a siege by Polish and Lithuanian brigands. The peasant rebel Ivan Bolotnikov was executed in Kargopol in 1608.

After Russia regained access to the Baltic Sea and St. Petersburg was founded, Kargopol gradually faded to obscurity. However, the people of Kargopol were still active in the exploration of Asian Russia. Alexander Baranov, the first governor of Russian America (Alaska), was born in this town.

== Administrative and municipal status ==
Within the framework of administrative divisions, Kargopol serves as the administrative center of Kargopolsky District. As an administrative division, it is incorporated within Kargopolsky District as the town of district significance of Kargopol. As a municipal division, the town of district significance of Kargopol, together with the village of Zazhigino in Pavlovsky Selsoviet of Kargopolsky District, are incorporated within Kargopolsky Municipal District as Kargopolskoye Urban Settlement.

== Economy ==
=== Industry ===
Timber industry serves as the basis of the industry of Kargopolsky District. The linum production factory, which used to exist in Kargopol until the 1970s, is defunct.

=== Transportation ===
Kargopol is connected by a paved road with Nyandoma and further east the principal highway in the region, M8 connecting Moscow and Arkhangelsk. There is a road to the north, which connects to M8 via Plesetsk and Brin-Navolok. This is the historic trading route which connected Kargopol with Arkhangelsk before the railroad was built and long stretches of this road are still unpaved. The stretch between Kargopol and Plesetsk was paved in 2011. Another unpaved road in the western direction crosses the border with the Republic of Karelia and heads to Pudozh.

There is no railroad in Kargopol, even though at the time of construction of the railway between Vologda and Arkhangelsk—a decision taken by Tsar Alexander III in June 1894—it was the biggest town in the region, and the railway was constructed through unpopulated areas. There is an urban legend stating that Kargopol merchants were unhappy with the prospective of the railway construction in Kargopol, thinking it would deteriorate the trade, and therefore requested the railway to be built in detour. As a matter of fact, the local governance body, the Kargopol Duma, in September 1894 twice discussed the issue, came to the conclusion that the railroad construction indeed would deteriorate the trade, but that if it does not pass Kargopol, the damage would be much stronger. Therefore, on both occasions, the Duma sent a petition requesting that the railway would be rerouted via Kargopol. This did not occur since the construction had already started in August 1894, and since the detour would have been too big, as Kargopol is not on a straight line connecting Vologda with Arkhangelsk.

The Onega is only navigable between Kargopol and Lake Lacha, since there are rapids downstream of Kargopol.

There is an airport in Kargopol, but since at least the early 1990s it has only been used for transporting cargo.

== Geography ==
The town is located on both sides of the Onega River, several miles north of Lake Lacha, in the southwestern corner of the oblast.

=== Climate ===
Climate data for Kargopol
Month	Jan	Feb	Mar	Apr	May	Jun	Jul	Aug	Sep	Oct	Nov	Dec	Year
Mean daily maximum °C (°F)	−9 (16)	−7 (19)	−1 (30)	5 (41)	13 (55)	18 (64)	20 (68)	17 (63)	11 (52)	3 (37)	−2 (28)	−6 (21)	5 (41)
Daily mean °C (°F)	−12 (10)	−10 (14)	−4 (25)	1 (34)	8 (46)	13 (55)	16 (61)	13 (55)	8 (46)	1 (34)	−4 (25)	−9 (16)	2 (36)
Mean daily minimum °C (°F)	−16 (3)	−13 (9)	−8 (18)	2 (36)	4 (39)	9 (48)	12 (54)	9 (48)	5 (41)	−1 (30)	−6 (21)	−12 (10)	−1 (30)
Average precipitation days	28	23	22	18	17	17	16	18	18	23	27	29	256
Source: Weatherbase

== Culture and recreation ==
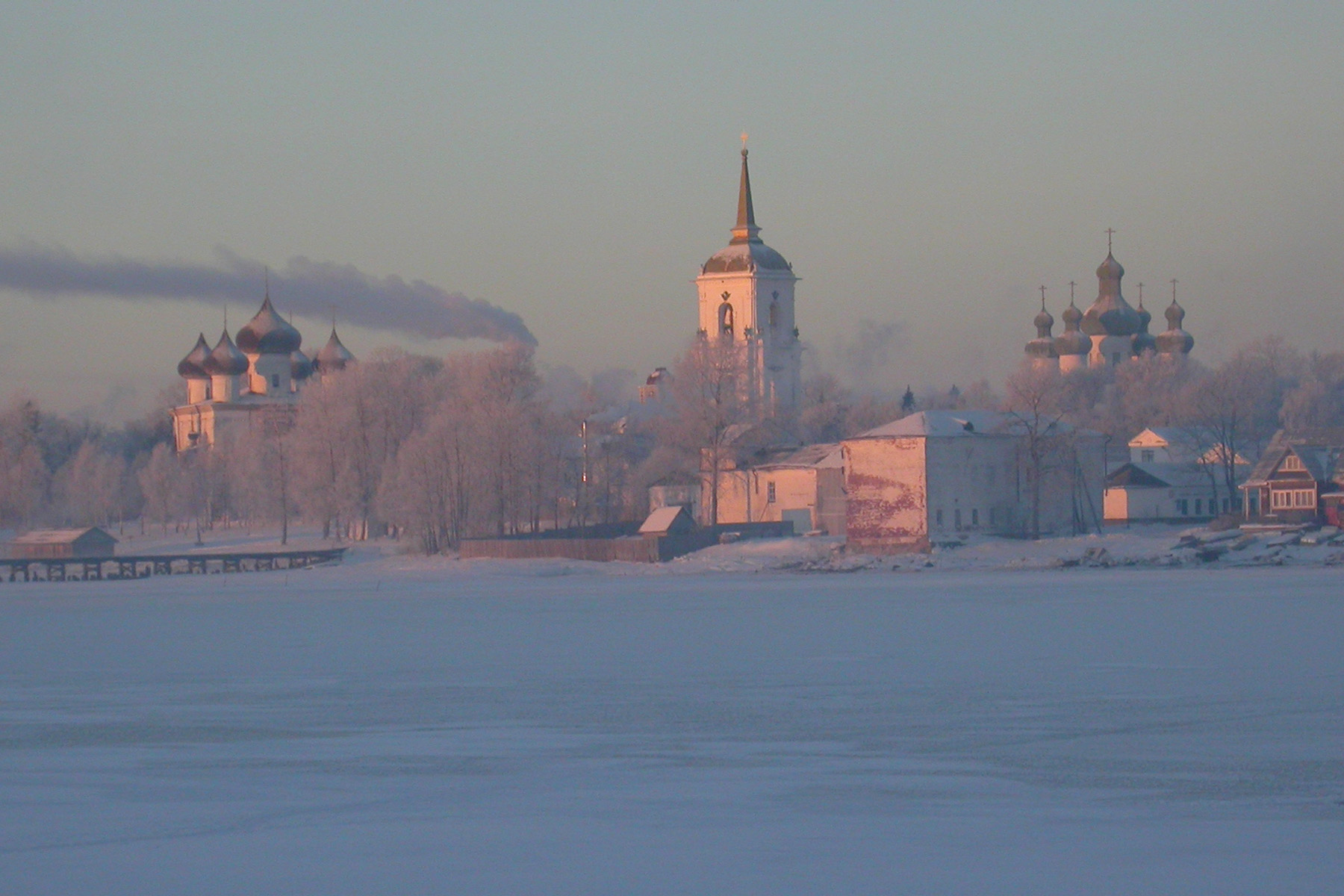
The 17th-century churches of Kargopol are decorated with unique stone carving

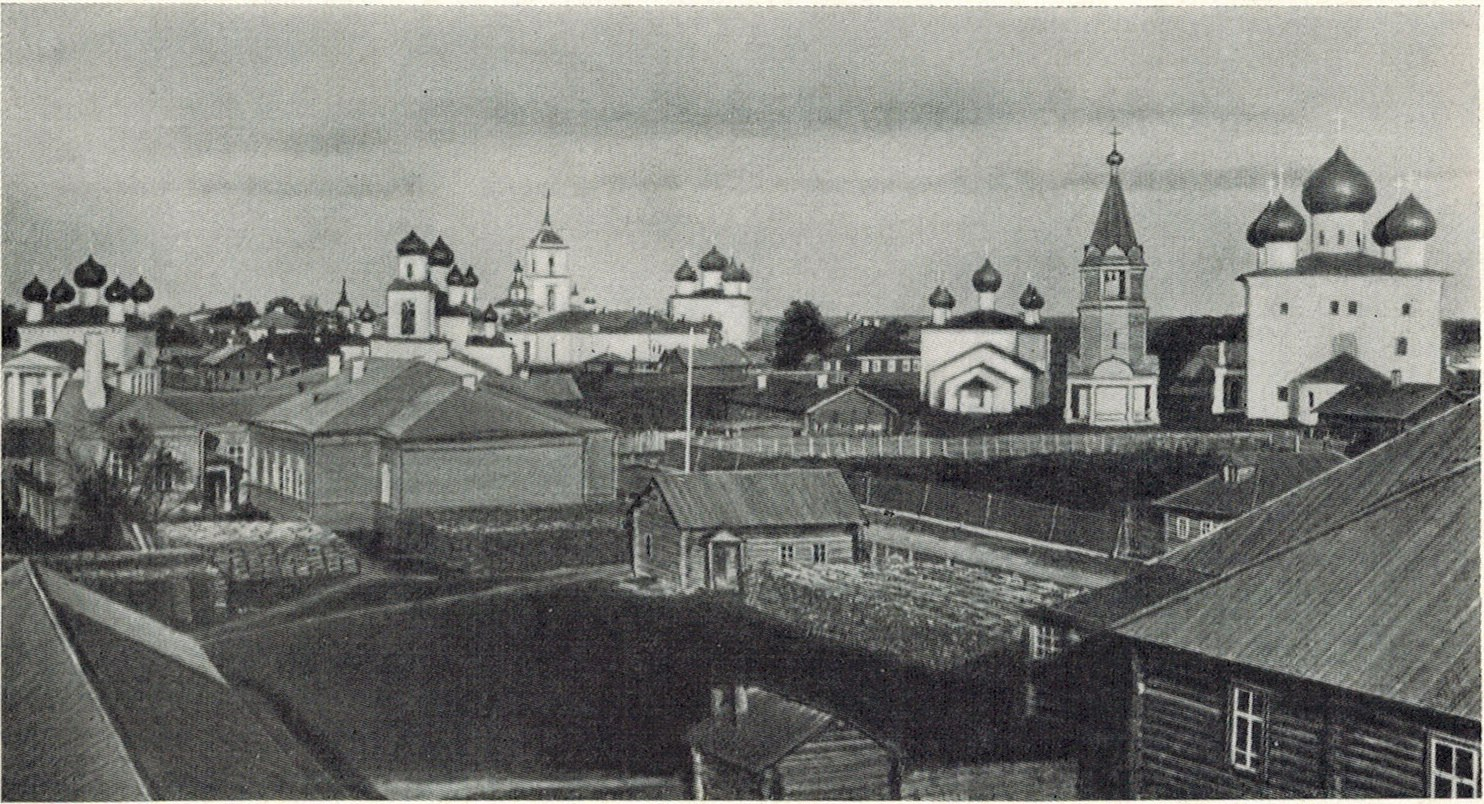
Kargopol in the early 20th century

Today, Kargopol is a sleepy historical town adjoining the Kenozersky National Park. It is best known in Russia for Kargopol toys (Kargopolskiye igrushki), which are small, simple clay figures painted in traditional style.

During its golden age in the 17th century, Kargopol became home to a highly localized brand of medieval Russian architecture. Quite a few wooden and white stone churches survive in the town and its vicinity. The earliest of these buildings is the black-domed Cathedral of the Nativity of Christ, built of dolomite by Novgorodians and consecrated in 1562. The interior features a curious iron hand sticking from the drum. A hallmark of Kargopol churches is delicate stone carving.

The Kargopol stone churches are classified as historical and architectural heritage and include:

- Cathedral of the Nativity of Christ (1552–1562) with the bell-tower (1766–1767)
- Resurrection Church (end of the 17th century)
- Church of the Nativity of Saint John the Baptist (1740–1751)
- Holy Trinity Church (1790–1802)
- Presentation Church (1803)
- an ensemble of three churches: the Annunciation Church (1692), the Saint Nicholas Church (1741), and the Church of the Nativity of the Theotokos (1678–1680)

Kargopol is classified as a historical town by the Ministry of Culture of Russian Federation, which implies certain restrictions on construction in the historical center.

The only state museum in the town is the Kargopol State Museum of History, Art, and Architecture, founded in 1919. This is a cloak organization, which not only holds ethnographic, art, and historic exhibits, but also protects some of the architectural monuments in Kargopol and surroundings. Fifteen buildings, including a number of churches, are museum property. There are also two private museums in Kargopol.
