= Kargopolsky District =

Kargopolsky District Каргопольский район (Russian)
- District
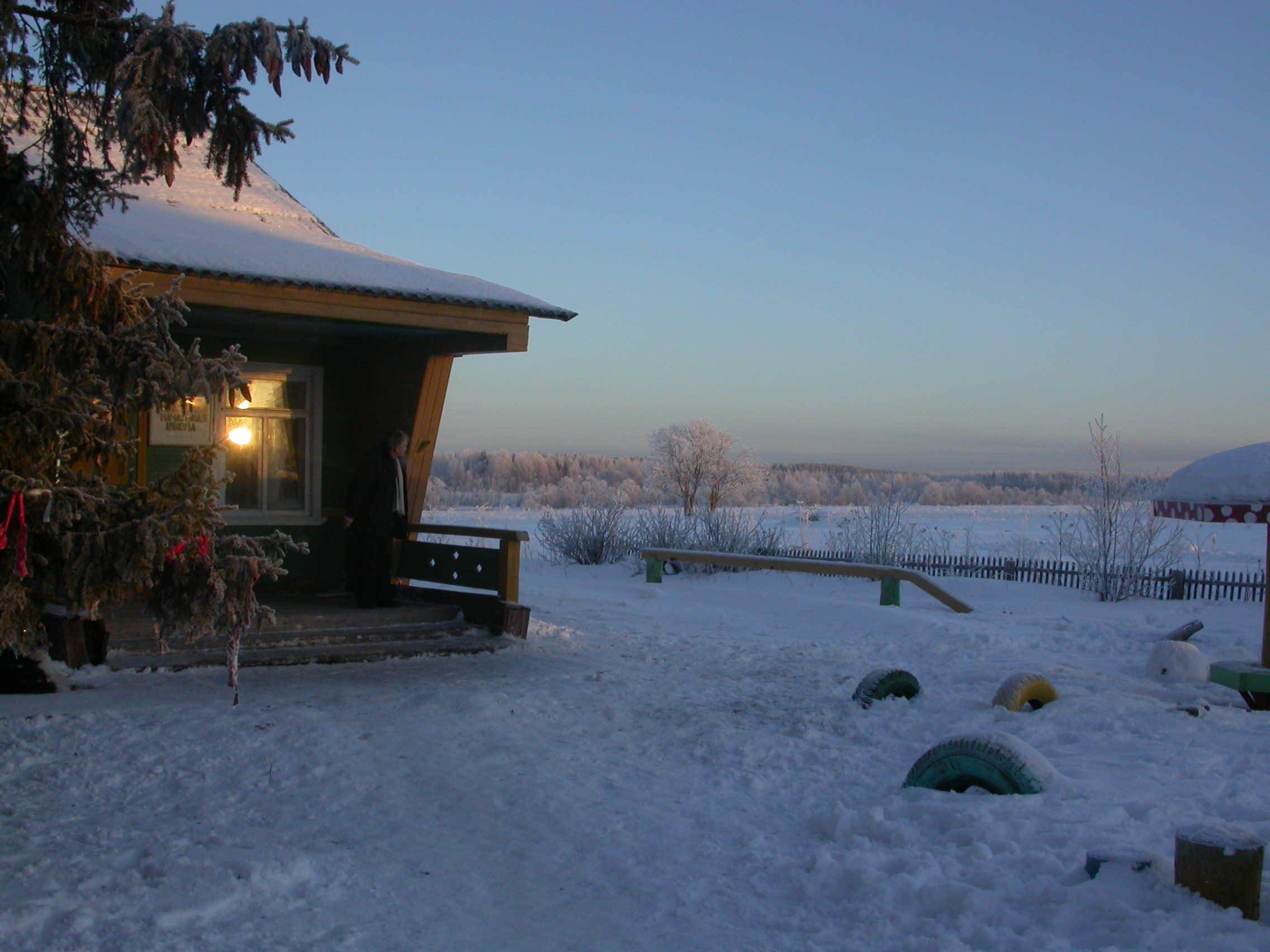
- Primary school in the village of Gavrilovskaya in Kargopolsky District

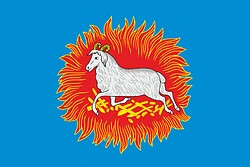
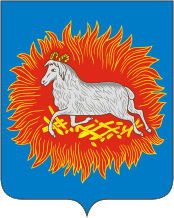
- Flag Coat of arms
- Location of Kargopolsky District in Arkhangelsk Oblast
- Coordinates: 61°30′N 38°56′E
- Country: Russia
- Federal subject: Arkhangelsk Oblast
- Established: July 15, 1929
- Administrative center: Kargopol

Area
  - Total: 10,127 km^{2} (3,910 sq mi)

Population (2010 Census)
  - Total: 18,466
  - Density: 1.8234/km^{2} (4.7227/sq mi)
  - Urban: 55.3%
  - Rural: 44.7%

Administrative structure
  - Administrative divisions: 1 Towns of district significance, 12 Selsoviets
  - Inhabited localities: 1 cities/towns, 242 rural localities

Municipal structure
  - Municipally incorporated as: Kargopolsky Municipal District
  - Municipal divisions: 1 urban settlements, 5 rural settlements
- Time zone: UTC+3 (MSK)
- OKTMO ID: 11618000
- Website: http://www.kargopolland.ru/

Kargopolsky District (Russian: Каргопо́льский райо́н) is an administrative district (raion), one of the twenty-one in Arkhangelsk Oblast, Russia. As a municipal division, it is incorporated as Kargopolsky Municipal District. It is located in the southwest of the oblast and borders with Plesetsky District in the north, Nyandomsky District in the northeast, Konoshsky District in the east, Kirillovsky District of Vologda Oblast in the south, Vytegorsky District, also of Vologda Oblast, in the southwest, and with Pudozhsky District of the Republic of Karelia in the northwest. The area of the district is 10,127 square kilometers (3,910 sq mi). Its administrative center is the town of Kargopol. Population: 18,466 (2010 census); 21,514 (2002 census); 24,589 (1989 Soviet census). The population of Kargopol accounts for 55.3% of the district's total population.

== History ==
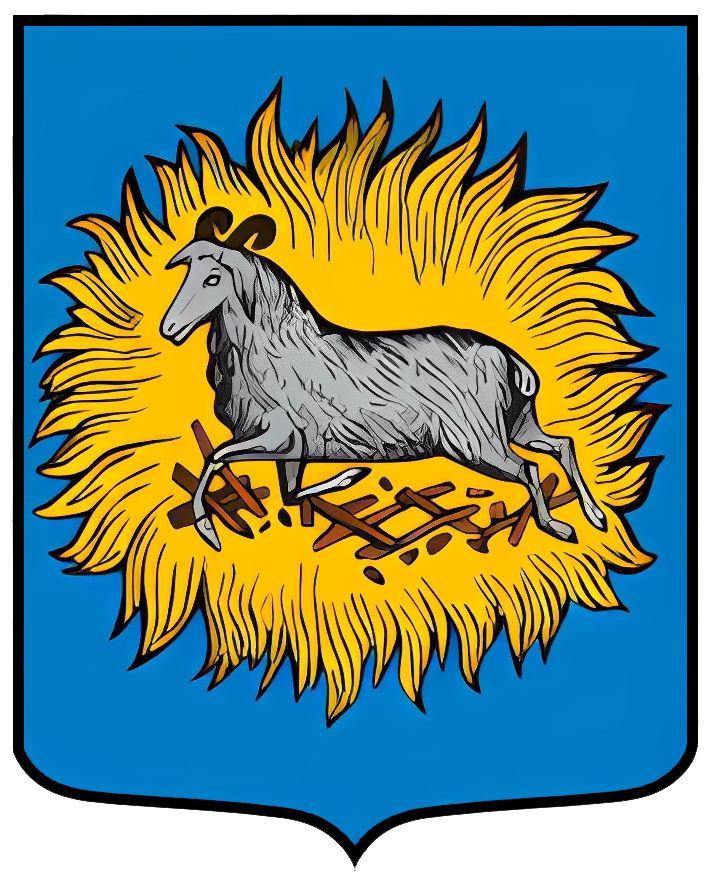
The coat of arms of Kargopol from 1781

The area was populated by speakers of Uralic languages and then colonized by the Novgorod Republic. Traditionally, the foundation of Kargopol is thought to be in 1146, although it was not first mentioned in the chronicles until the 14th century. In the 15th century, it was already a fortress, playing an important role in the struggle between Novgorod and the emerging power of Moscow. In particular, in 1447 the outlaw prince Dmitry Shemyaka, after being chased from Moscow by Vasily II, fled to Kargopol and stayed there for over a year. After the fall of Novgorod, the area became a part of the Grand Duchy of Moscow. In the 16th century, Kargopol was one of the biggest towns of Russia, and was mainly a merchant town due to its location on the road from Moscow to Arkhangelsk (at the time, the main Russian harbor for European trade). Kargopol was also used for political exile. For instance, Ivan Bolotnikov, the leader of the peasant insurgence, was sent to Kargopol in 1607, where he was blinded and then drowned. After St. Petersburg was built in 1703, the trade was rerouted to the Baltic Sea and the importance of Kargopol diminished.

In the course of the administrative reform carried out in 1708 by Peter the Great, the area was included into Ingermanland Governorate (known from 1710 as Saint Petersburg Governorate). In 1727, it was transferred to the newly established Novgorod Governorate. After a number of administrative reforms, in 1801 Kargopol ended up as the seat of Kargopolsky Uyezd, one of the four uyezds of the newly established Olonets Governorate. On April 30, 1919, Kargopolsky Uyezd was transferred to Vologda Governorate, and in 1922, when Olonets Governorate was abolished, some areas from Vytegorsky Uyezd were transferred to Kargopolsky Uyezd. On July 15, 1929, the uyezds were abolished, the governorates merged into Northern Krai, and Kargopolsky District was established among others. It became a part of Nyandoma Okrug of Northern Krai.

The areas south of Lake Lacha belonged to Kirillovsky Uyezd of Novgorod Governorate. In 1918, five uyezds of Novgorod Governorate, including Kirillovsky Uyezd, were split off to form Cherepovets Governorate. In 1919, these areas were transferred to Kargopolsky Uyezd.

In the following years, the first-level administrative division of Russia kept changing. In 1930, the okrug was abolished, and the district was subordinated to the central administration of Northern Krai. In 1936, the krai was transformed into Northern Oblast. In 1937, Northern Oblast itself was split into Arkhangelsk Oblast and Vologda Oblast. Kargopolsky District remained in Arkhangelsk Oblast ever since.

== Geography ==
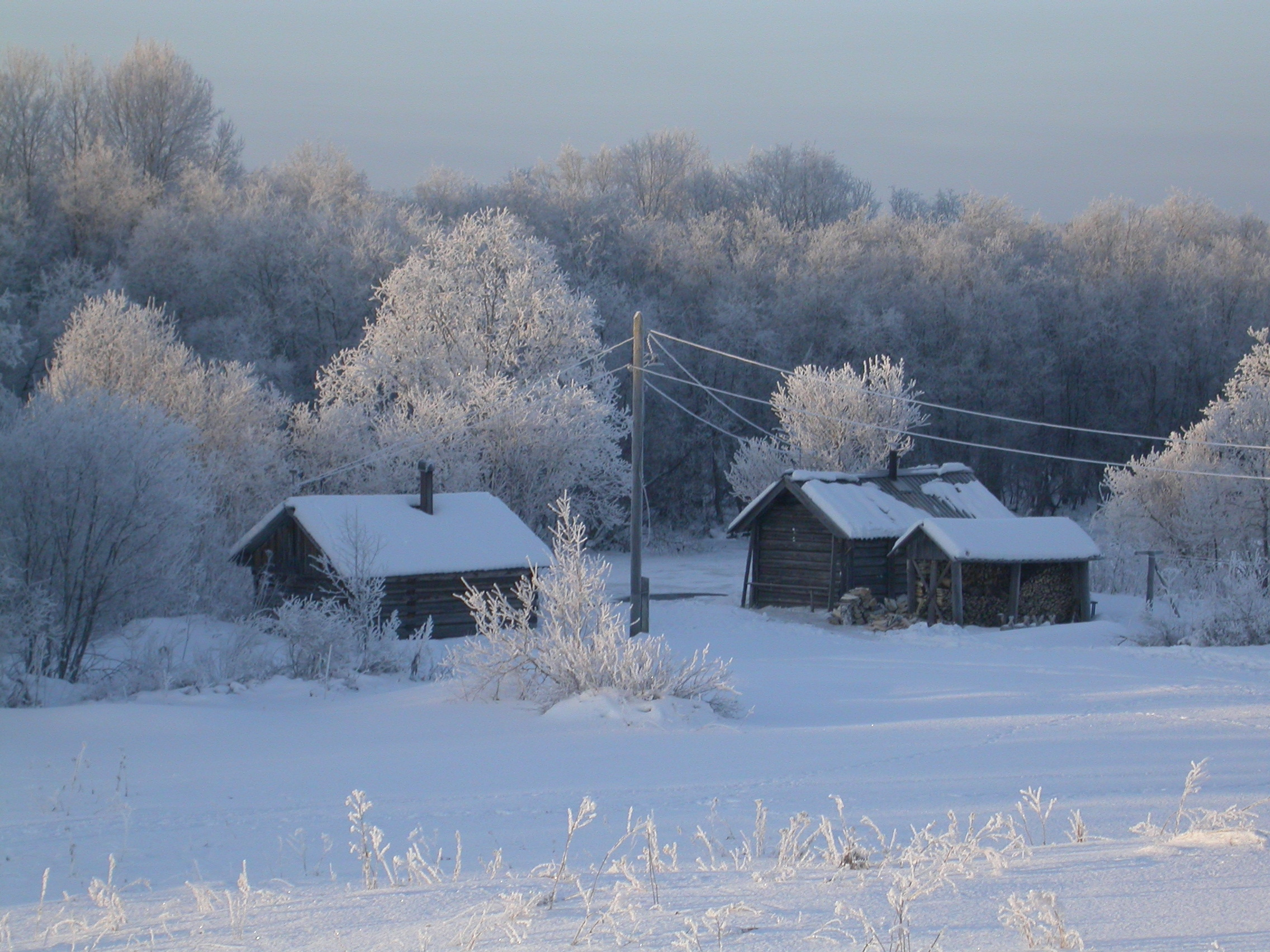
The village of Niz in winter

The district is almost exclusively located in the basin of the Onega River, which is the biggest river in the district, and belongs to the basin of the White Sea. The source of the Onega is Lake Lacha, which is the biggest lake in the district. The northeastern shore of Lake Vozhe, also in the basin of the Onega, belongs to Kargopolsky District, but the lake itself is in Vologda Oblast. The two lakes are connected by the Svid River. The major tributary of the Onega is the Voloshka River (left). Some minor areas in the northwest of the district belong to the basin of the Vodla River and eventually of the Baltic Sea, and very minor areas in the southwest belong to the basin of the Kema River and eventually to the Caspian Sea.

There are many lakes in the district, especially in the northwest. The biggest lake after Lake Lacha is Lake Lyokshmozero, which is connected to the Onega by the Lyokshma River.

The major part of the district is covered by coniferous forests (taiga).

The northern part of the district, including Lake Lyokshmozero, is included into Kenozersky National Park (which is split between Kargopolsky and Plesetsky Districts).

== Administrative and municipal status ==
The borders of Kargopolsky District for the most part conform to those of the municipal district, with the exception of the settlement of Sovza, which is administratively a part of Yertsevsky Selsoviet of Konoshsky District, but is municipally incorporated within Ukhotskoye Rural Settlement of Kargopolsky Municipal District.

=== Administrative divisions ===
As an administrative division, the district is divided into twelve selsoviets and one town of district significance (Kargopol). The following selsoviets have been established (the administrative centers are given in parentheses):

- Kalitinsky (Kalitinka)
- Khotenovsky (Kononovo)
- Krechetovsky (Krechetovo)
- Lyokshmozersky (Morshchikhinskaya)
- Lodyginsky (Kazakovo)
- Oshevensky (Shiryaikha)
- Pavlovsky (Prigorodny)
- Pechnikovsky (Vatamanovskaya)
- Priozyorny (Shelokhovskaya)
- Tikhmangsky (Patrovskaya)
- Usachevsky (Usachevskaya)
- Ukhotsky (Pesok)

=== Municipal divisions ===
As a municipal division, the district is divided into one urban settlement and five rural settlements (the administrative centers are given in parentheses):

- Kargopolskoye Urban Settlement (Kargopol)
- Oshevenskoye Rural Settlement (Shiryaikha)
- Pavlovskoye Rural Settlement (Prigorodny)
- Pechnikovskoye Rural Settlement (Vatamanovskaya)
- Priozyornoye Rural Settlement (Shelokhovskaya)
- Ukhotskoye Rural Settlement (Pesok)

== Economy ==
=== Industry ===
Timber industry is the basic industry of the district. The linum production factory, which used to exist in Kargopol until the 1970s, is defunct.

=== Agriculture ===
Traditionally, the lands northwest of Kargopol were used to grow crops, and until the 1970s linum was also cultivated. However, these activities became unprofitable due to depopulation (in a hundred years, the number of villages was reduced by a factor of five), and in the 1970s the district's production shifted to beef and milk. This has been further reduced in the 1990s due to the economic crisis in Russia. There is also fishery, mainly on the lakes including Lake Lacha.

=== Transportation ===
Kargopol is connected by a paved road with Nyandoma and further east the principal highway in the region, M8 connecting Moscow and Arkhangelsk. There is a road to the north, which connects to M8 via Plesetsk and Brin-Navolok. This is the historic trading route which connected Kargopol with Arkhangelsk before the railroad was built, and long stretches of this road are still unpaved. The stretch between Kargopol and Plesetsk was paved in 2011. Another unpaved road in the western direction crosses the border with the Republic of Karelia and heads to Pudozh.

There is no railroad in Kargopol, even though at the time of construction of the railway between Vologda and Arkhangelsk (the decision on the route was taken by Tsar Alexander III in June 1894) it was the biggest town in the region, and the railway was constructed through unpopulated areas. There is an urban legend stating that Kargopol merchants were unhappy with the prospective of the railway construction in Kargopol thinking it would deteriorate the trade, and therefore requested the railway to be built in detour. As a matter of fact, the local governance body, the Kargopol Duma, in September 1894 twice discussed the issue, came to the conclusion that the railroad construction indeed would deteriorate the trade, but that if it does not pass Kargopol, the damage would be much stronger. Therefore, on both occasions, the Duma sent a petition requesting that the railway would be rerouted via Kargopol. This did not occur, since the construction has already started in August 1894, and since the detour would be too big, as Kargopol is not on a straight line connecting Vologda with Arkhangelsk.

== Culture and recreation ==
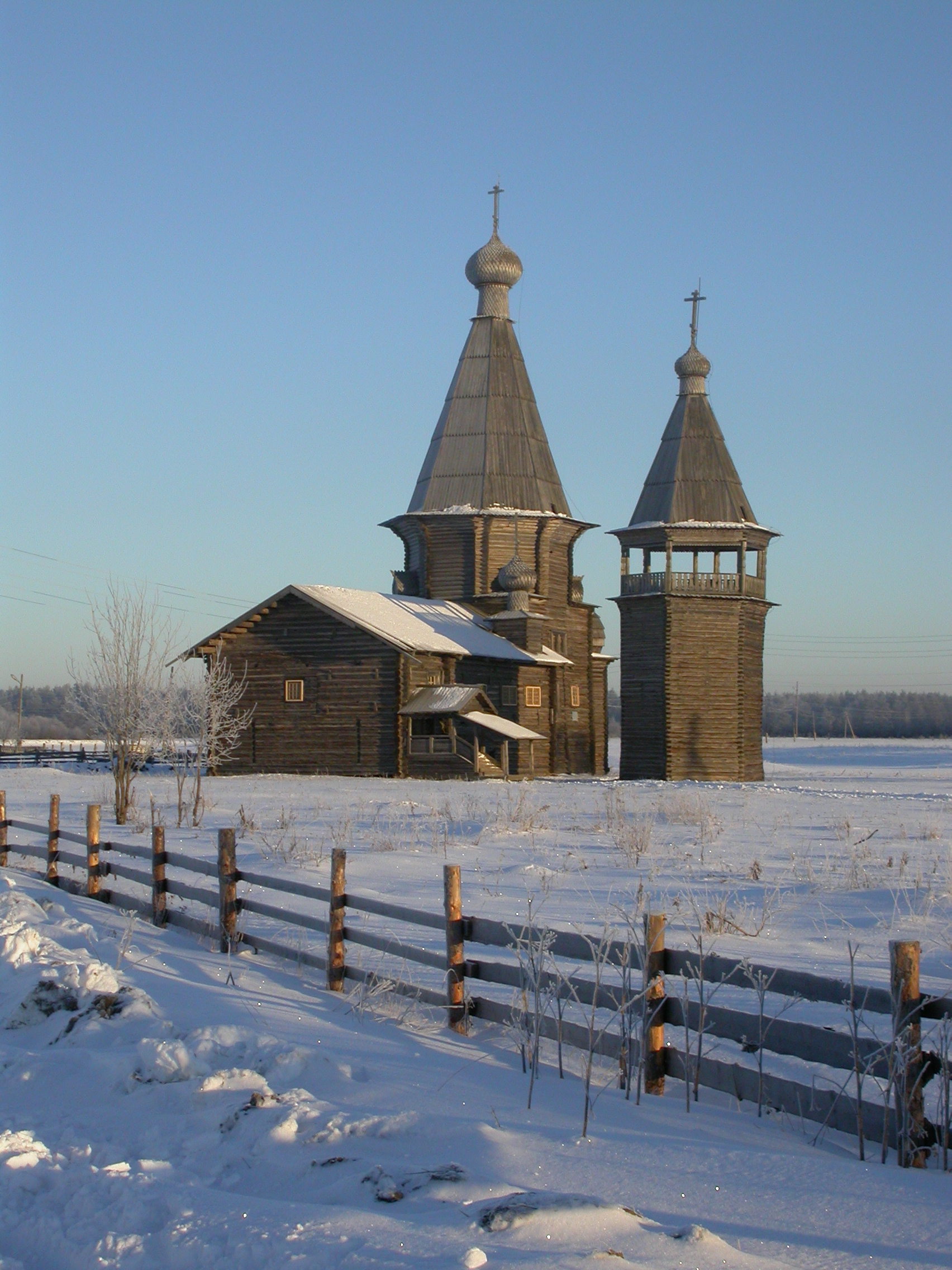
The Saunino Pogost: the wooden church of St. John Chrysostom (1665) with bell tower

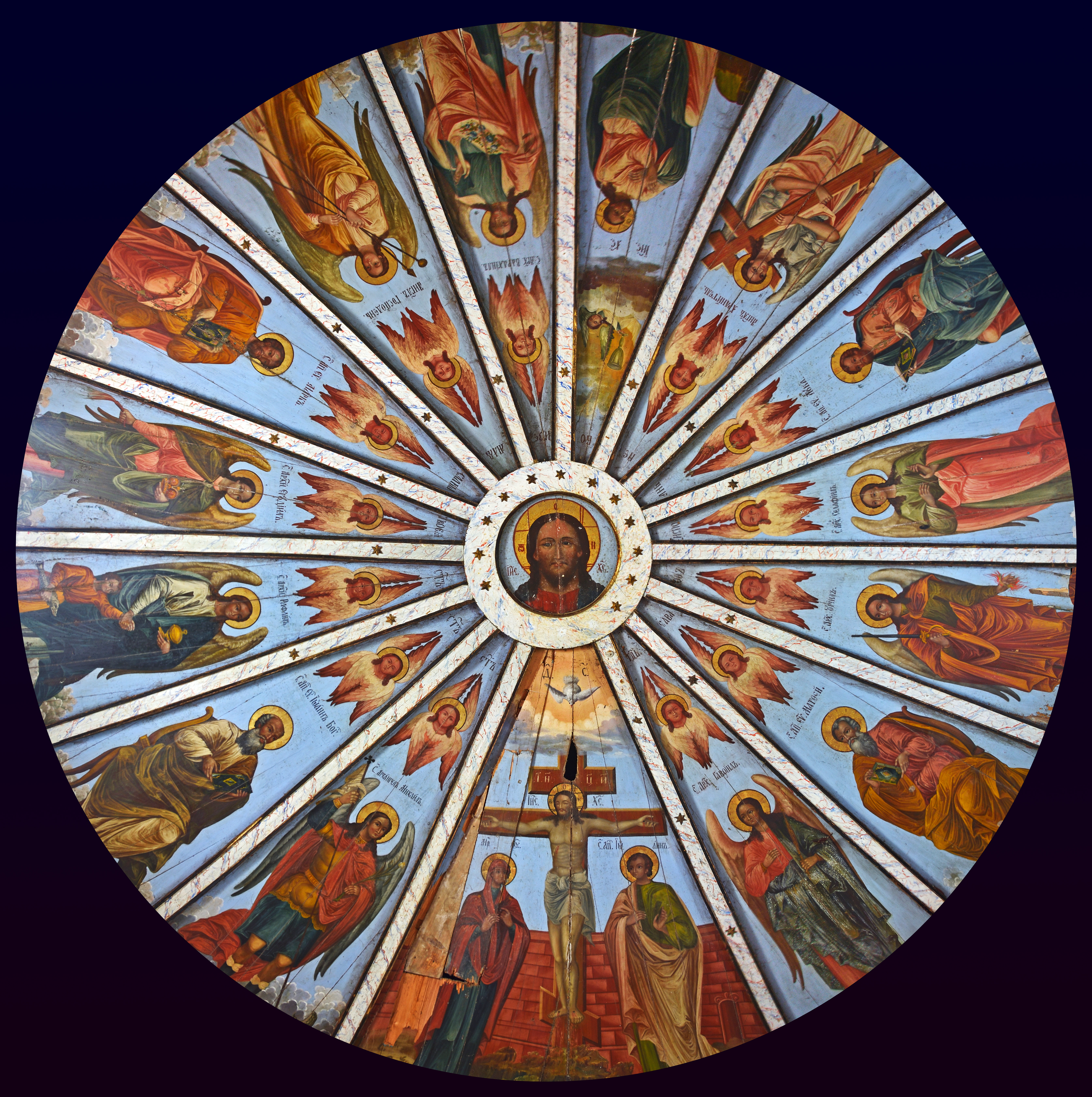
The painted ceiling of the St. Michael church in Arkhangelo

Kargopolsky District has a very high concentration of historical, archaeological, and architectural monuments. The district contains 40 objects (thirteen of them in Kargopol) classified as cultural and historical heritage by Russian Federal law, and additionally 182 objects classified as cultural and historical heritage of local importance. Most of these are the white-stone churches of the town of Kargopol and wooden churches and chapels located in the area. The town of Kargopol contains a number of white-stone churches, the earliest of which, the Cathedral of the Nativity of Christ, dates back to 1552. This is the oldest building of mainland Arkhangelsk Oblast (some buildings of the Solovetsky Monastery also stem from the 16th century).

The monuments classified as historical and architectural heritage include:

- The Cathedral of the Nativity of Christ (1552–1562) with the bell-tower (1766–1767) in Kargopol
- The Resurrection Church (end of 17th century) in Kargopol
- The Church of the Nativity of Saint John the Baptist (1740–1751) in Kargopol
- The Holy Trinity Church (1790–1802) in Kargopol
- The Presentation Church (1803) in Kargopol
- The ensemble of three churches: the Annunciation Church (1692), the Saint Nicholas Church (1741), and the Church of the Nativity of the Theotokos (1678–1680) in Kargopol
- The ensemble of Aleksandro-Oshevensky Monastery (from 1707) in Oshevensk
- The ensemble of Pogost Bolshaya Shalga consisting of the Nativity Church (1745) and the Intercession Church (1857) in Bolshaya Shalga
- The Saint Nicholas Church (1659) in Pavlovsky Pogost; no longer exists
- The Saint Nicholas Church (1666) in Volosovo
- The Church of the Presentation of Jesus in the Temple in Krasnaya Lyaga, a former village west of Kargopol;
- The triple ensemble in Lyadiny (Gavrilovskaya) the Church of the Protection of the Theotokos (1693), the Intercession Church (1761), and the bell-tower (1820). The Intercession Church and the bell-tower burned down on May 6, 2013 and do not any longer exist.
- The Saint Nicholas Chapel (1834) in the village of Pogost
- The ensemble of the Saunino Pogost consisting of the Church of Saint John Chrysostom (1665) and the bell-tower (18th century) in Kiprovo

The only state museum in the district is Kargopol State Museum of History, Art, and Architecture, founded in 1919. This is cloak organization, which not only holds ethnographic, art and historic exhibits, but also protects some of the architectural monuments in Kargopol and surroundings. Fifteen buildings, including a number of churches, belong to the museum. Another museum was open in 1994 in the school of the selo of Lyadiny. There are also two private museums in Kargopol.

There is a traditional handicraft in Kargopol and the area which is production of painted clay toys.
