= Udimskaya narrow-gauge railway =

Railway in Arkhangelsk Oblast, Russia

Coordinates: 61.143084°N 45.9205748°E

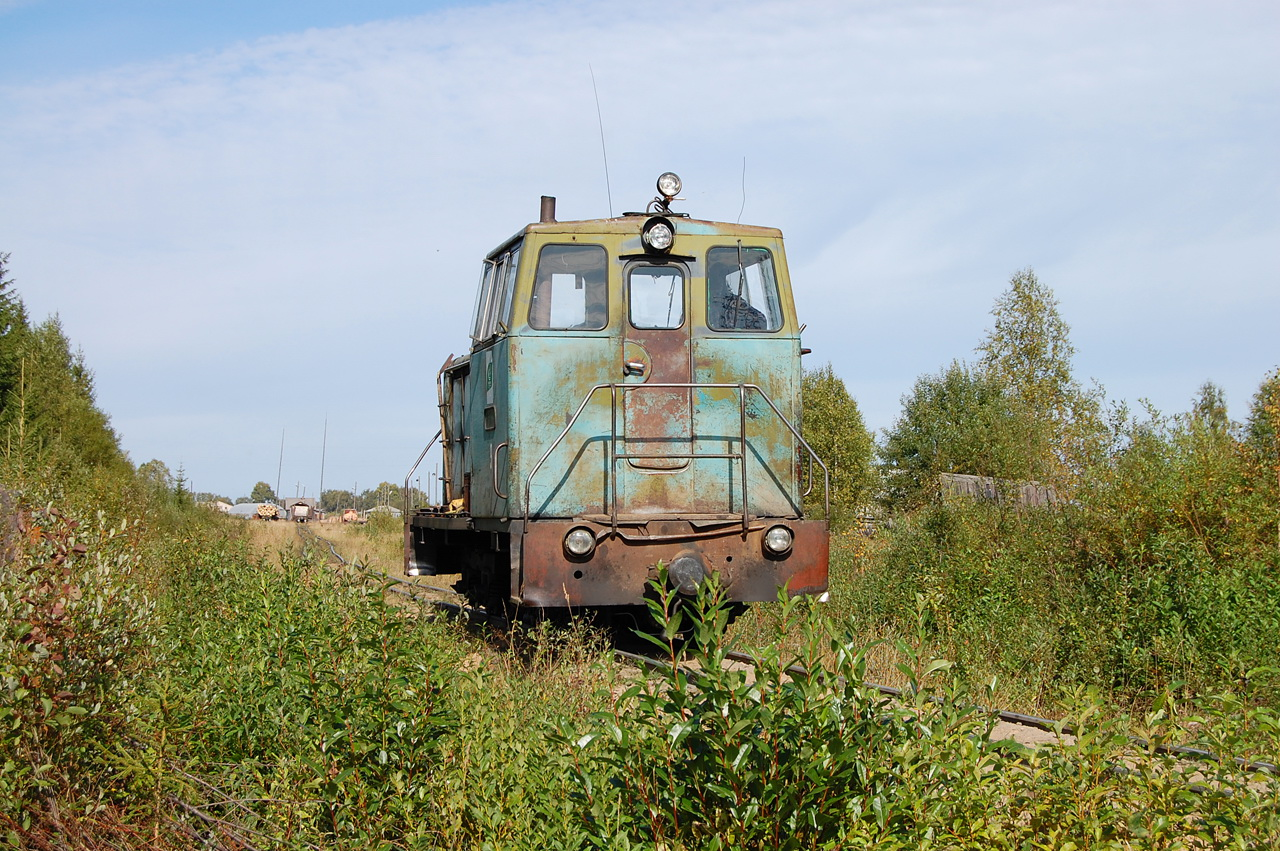

Overview
- Locale: Arkhangelsk Oblast, Russia
- Termini: Udimsky
- Website: www.ilimgroup.com

Service
- Type: Narrow-gauge railway
- Operator: OJSC «Ilim Group»

History
- Opened: 1938

Technical
- Line length: 61 kilometres (38 mi)
- Track gauge: 750 mm (2 ft 5 1/2 in)
Route map

The Udimskaya narrow-gauge railway is located in Arkhangelsk Oblast, Russia. The forest railway was opened in 1938 and currently operates year-round. The track gauge is 750 mm (2 ft 5 1/2 in) and the railway has a total length of 61 kilometres (38 mi).

== Current status ==
The Udimskaya forestry railway first line narrow-gauge railway emerged in the 1938, in the area of Kotlassky District, Arkhangelsk Oblast from the village Udimsky. The total length of the Udimskaya railway at the peak of its development exceeded 81 kilometres (50 mi), of which 61 kilometres (38 mi) is currently operational. The railway operates scheduled freight services from Udimsky, used for forestry tasks for transportation of felled logs and forestry workers. In 2009, completed construction of a new locomotive depot.

== Rolling stock ==
=== Locomotives ===
- TU6D – No. 0336
- TU6A – No. 2313, 3076, 3078, 3146, 3271, 3438, 3487, 3841
- TU8 – No. 0323
- TD-5U "Pioneer"

=== Railroad car ===
- Boxcar
- Tank car
- Snowplow
- Dining car
- Passenger car
- Railway log-car and flatcar
- Hopper car to transport track ballast

== Gallery ==
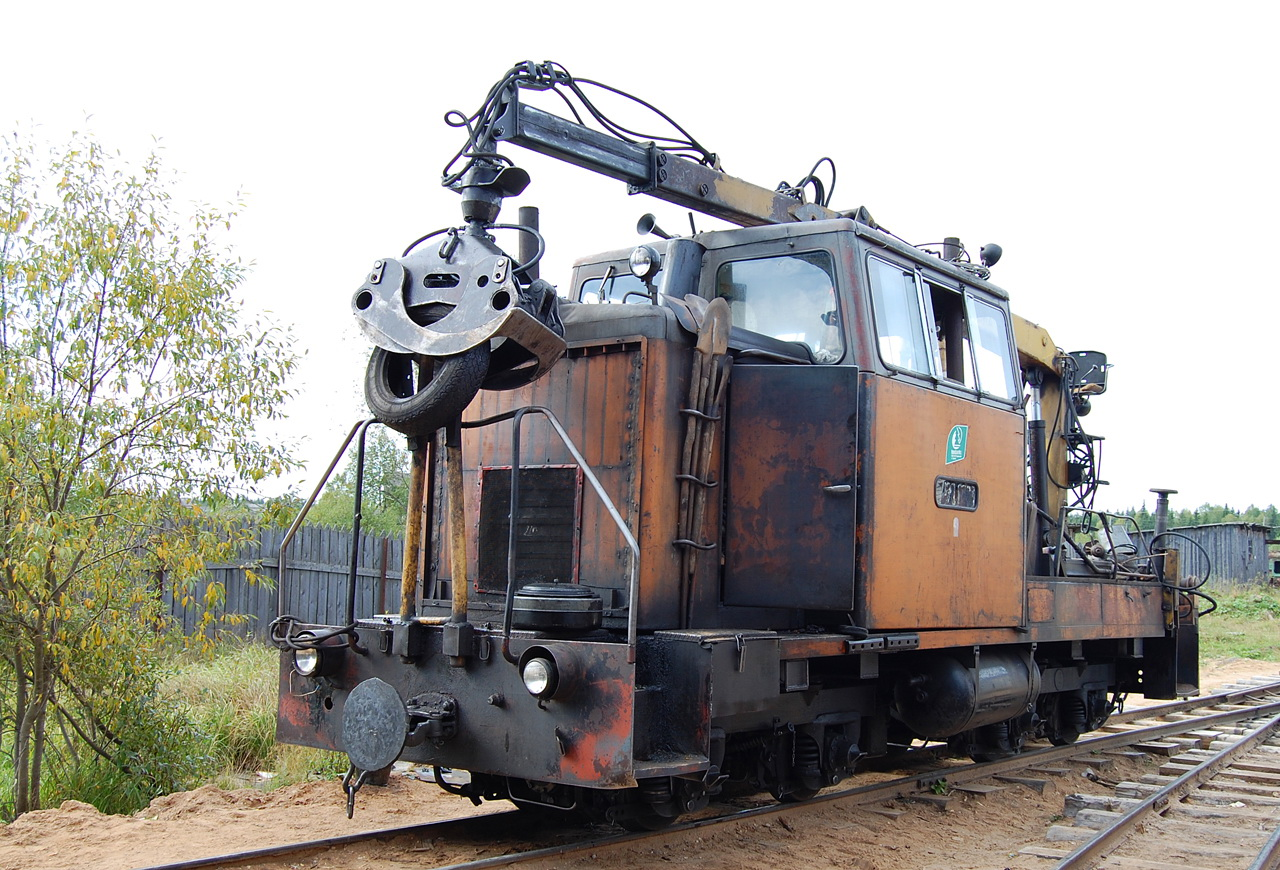
Locomotive TU6D – No. 0336

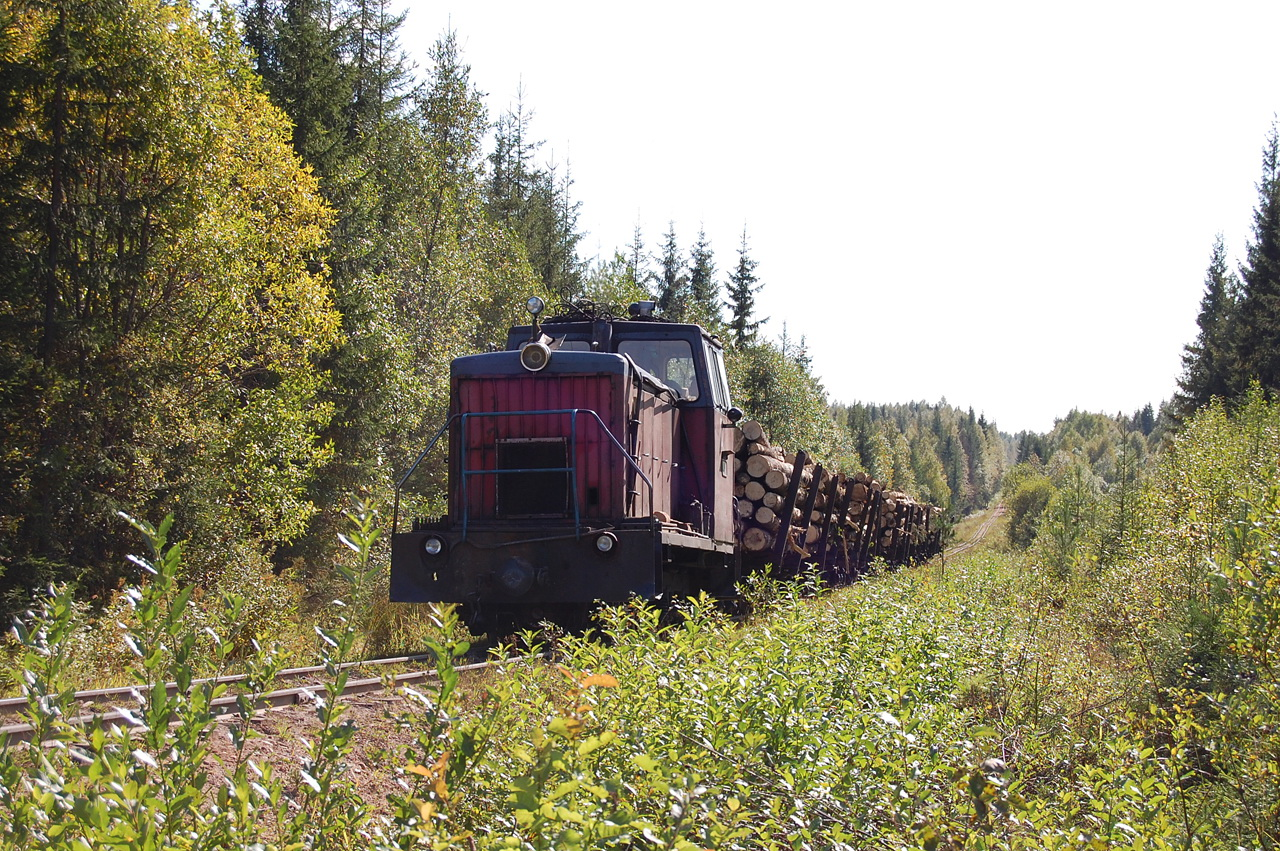
Log Train

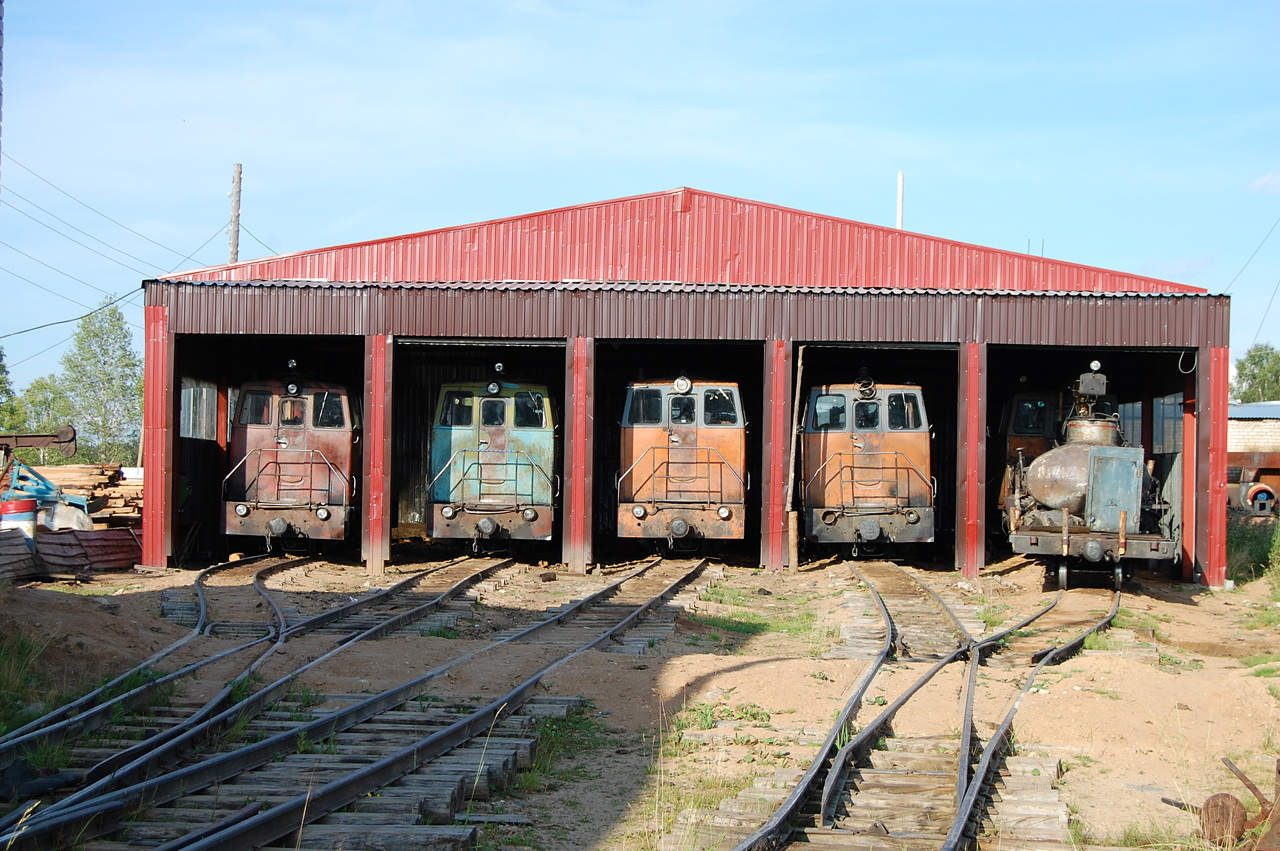
New locomotive depot

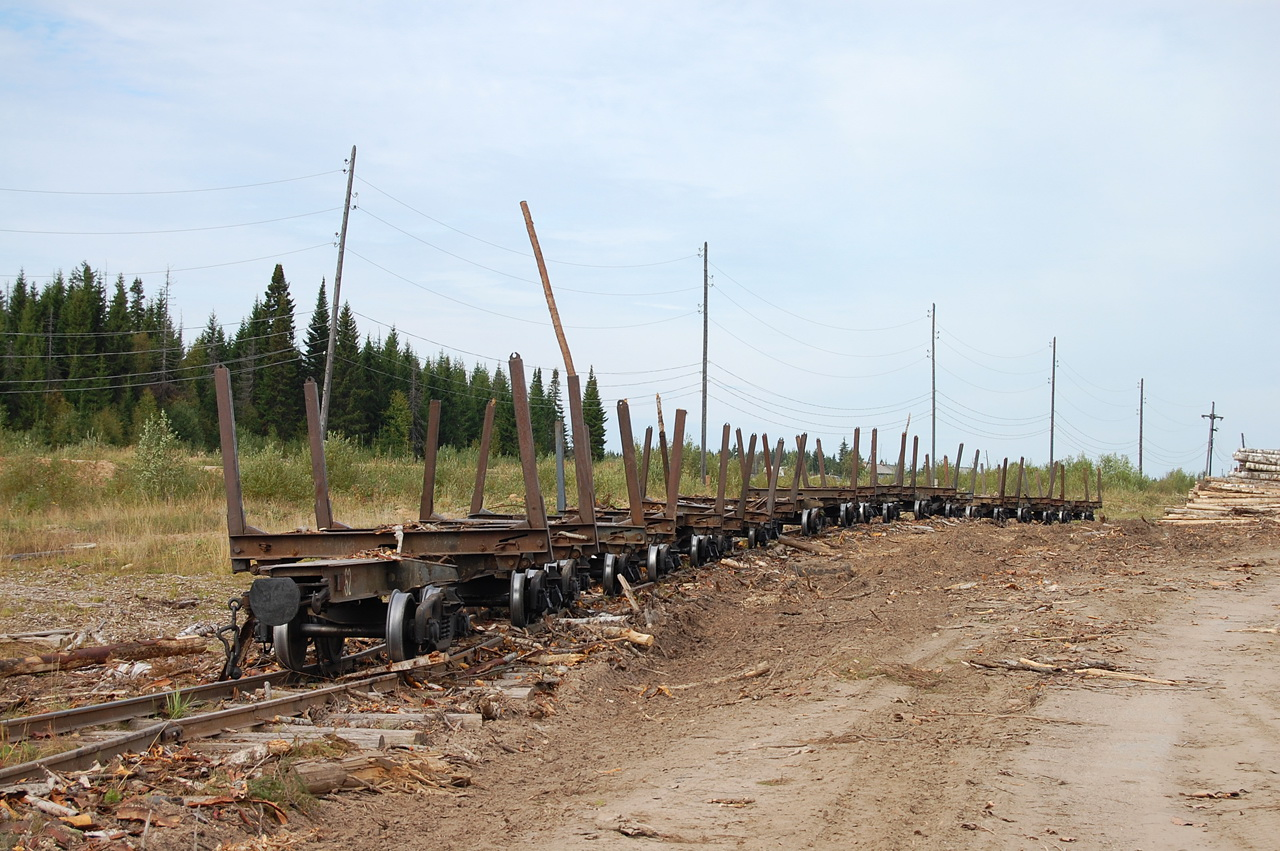
Railway log-cars

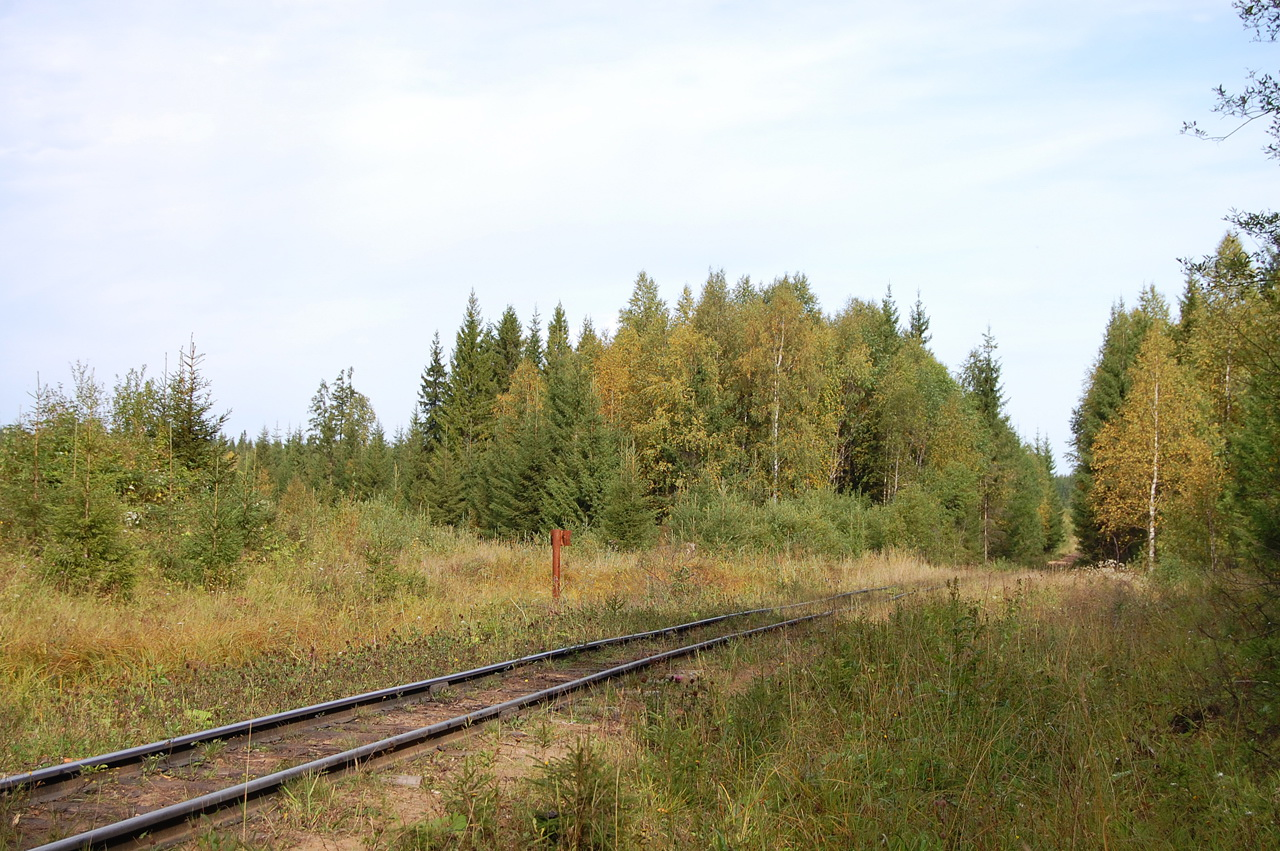
Udimskaya railway

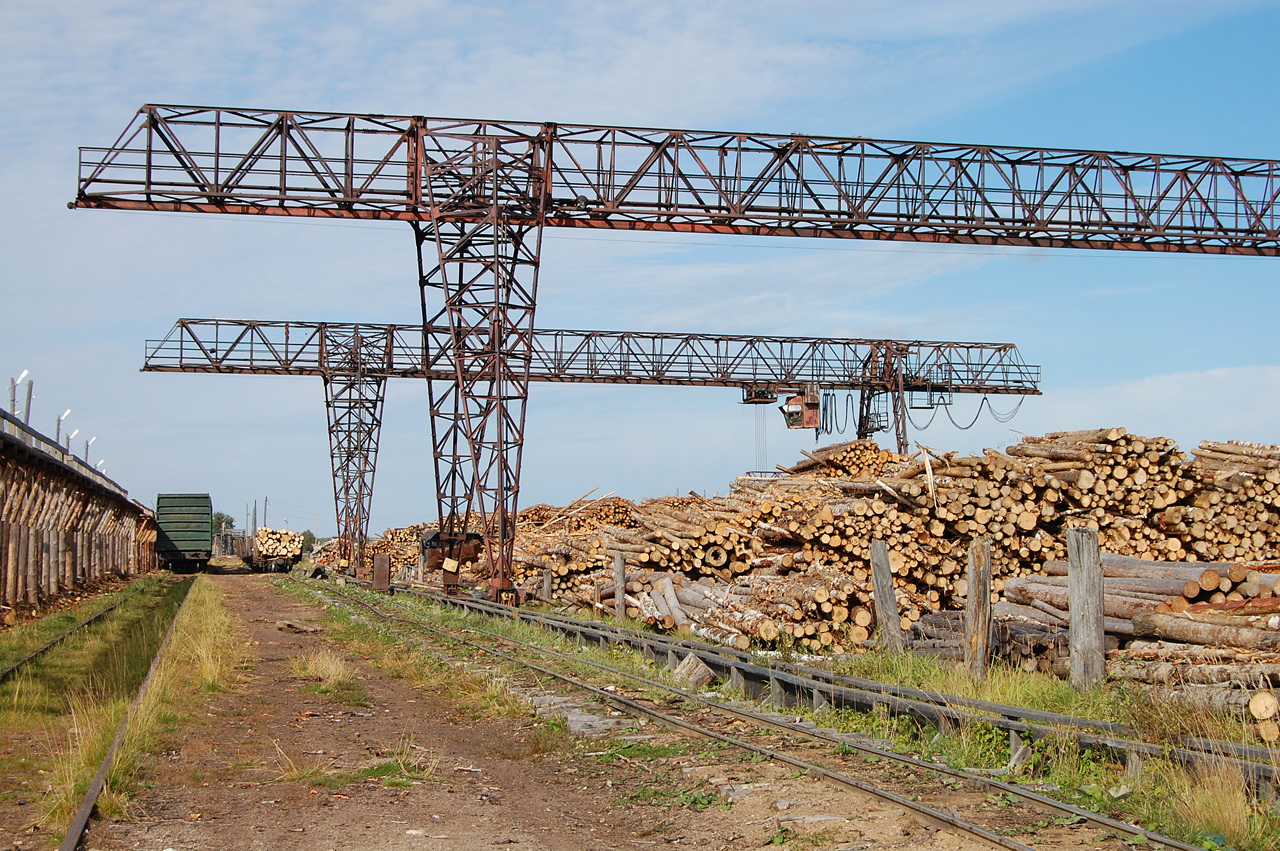
Freight station

== See also ==
- Narrow-gauge railways in Russia
