= Privodino =

Privodino Приводино
- Work settlement
- Interactive map of Privodino
- Location of Privodino Privodino (Arkhangelsk Oblast)
- Coordinates: 61°04′25″N 46°29′12″E
- Country: Russia
- Federal subject: Arkhangelsk Oblast
- Administrative district: Kotlassky District
- Work settlementSelsoviet: Privodino Work Settlement
- First mentioned: 1726
- Urban-type settlement status since: April 26, 1941
- Elevation: 55 m (180 ft)

Population (2010 Census)
  - Total: 3,161
  - Estimate (2025): 3,067 (−3%)

Municipal status
  - Municipal district: Kotlassky Municipal District
  - Urban settlement: Privodinskoye Urban Settlement
  - Capital of: Privodinskoye Urban Settlement
- Time zone: UTC+3 (MSK)
- Postal code: 165391
- OKTMO ID: 11627157051
- Website: moprivodinskoe.ru

Privodino (Russian: Приводино) is an urban locality (a work settlement) in Kotlassky District of Arkhangelsk Oblast, Russia, located on the left bank of the Northern Dvina River 23 kilometers (14 mi) from Kotlas. Municipally, it is the administrative center of Privodinskoye Urban Settlement, one of the three urban settlements in the municipal district. Population: 3,161 (2010 census); 3,264 (2002 census); 3,154 (1989 Soviet census).

== History ==
Privodino was first mentioned as a selo in 1726. In the 19th century, it was the seat of Privodinskaya Volost, a part of Velikoustyugsky Uyezd of Vologda Governorate. In 1918, the area was transferred to the newly formed Northern Dvina Governorate, and in 1924 the uyezds were abolished in favor of the new divisions, the districts (raions). Privodino was included into Kotlassky District which was formed on June 25, 1924. In 1929, Northern Dvina Governorate was merged into Northern Krai, which in 1936 was transformed into Northern Oblast. In 1937, Northern Oblast was split into Arkhangelsk Oblast and Vologda Oblast.

On April 26, 1941, Privodino was granted work settlement status. In 2004, it was municipally incorporated as Privodinskoye Urban Settlement.

In 2002 children from a local school created a memorial to deported Poles who, following dekulakised peasants, formed the population of the nearby Monastyrok special settlement.

== Economy ==
=== Transportation ===
While the Northern Dvina is navigable, there is no regular passenger traffic.

Privodino is located on the highway connecting Kotlas with Veliky Ustyug (and eventually Vologda and Kostroma). There is regular passenger bus traffic.

Close to the settlement, there is a railway line connecting Yadrikha and Veliky Ustyug, with the Razyezd 15 km passing loop where the only train using the line used to stop before the passenger traffic was shut down in 2005.

Privodino has an oil-pumping station in the Baltic Pipeline System.

== See also ==
- Administrative divisions of Arkhangelsk Oblast
