= Penkino =

Penkino Пенкино
- Village
- Location within Arkhangelsk Oblast Location within Russia
- Coordinates: 61°15′N 47°41′E
- Country: Russia
- Region: Arkhangelsk Oblast
- District: Vilegodsky District
- Time zone: UTC+3:00

Penkino (Russian: Пенкино) is a rural locality (a village) in Vilegodsky District, Arkhangelsk Oblast, Russia. The population was 3 as of 2010.

== Geography ==
Penkino is located 29 km northwest of Ilyinsko-Podomskoye (the district's administrative centre) by road. Kochnegovskaya is the nearest rural locality.
