= Novinki =

Novinki Новинки
- Village
- Location within Arkhangelsk Oblast Location within Russia
- Coordinates: 61°08′N 46°34′E
- Country: Russia
- Region: Arkhangelsk Oblast
- District: Kotlassky District
- Time zone: UTC+3:00

Novinki (Russian: Новинки) is a rural locality (a village) in Privodinskoye Urban Settlement of Kotlassky District, Arkhangelsk Oblast, Russia. The population was 3 as of 2010.

== Geography ==
Novinki is located on the Severnaya Dvina River, 23 km south of Kotlas (the district's administrative centre) by road. Prislon Bolshoy is the nearest rural locality.
