= Viled (river) =

Viled Russian: Виледь
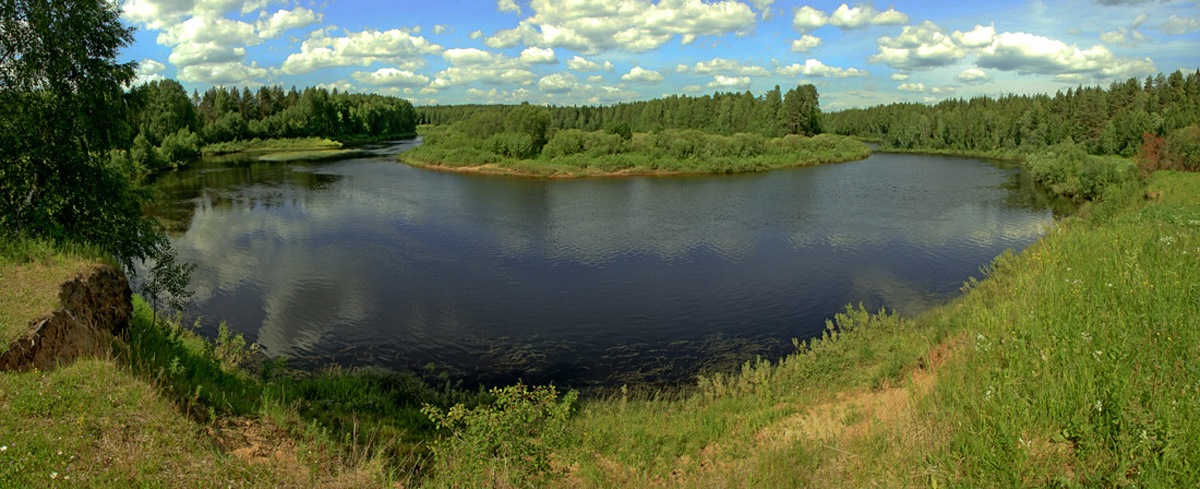
- The upper course of the Viled

Location
- Country: Russia

Physical characteristics
- Mouth: Vychegda
  - coordinates: 61°20′24″N 47°21′21″E
- Length: 321 km (199 mi)
- Basin size: 5,610 km^{2} (2,170 sq mi)
- Discharge
  - average: 42.7 m^{3}/s (1,510 cu ft/s)

Basin features
- Progression: Vychegda→ Northern Dvina→ White Sea

The Northern Dvina River basin

The Viled (Russian: Виледь) is a river in Lensky, Vilegodsky, and Kotlassky Districts of Arkhangelsk Oblast in Russia. It is a left tributary of the Vychegda. It is 321 kilometres (199 mi) long, and the area of its basin 5,610 square kilometres (2,170 sq mi). Its main tributary is the Velikaya Okhta (left).

The river basin of the Viled is spread over the Komi Republic, Arkhangelsk and Kirov Oblasts of Russia. The Viled is the principal river of Vilegodsky District, with the majority of villages, including the district's administrative center Ilyinsko-Podomskoye, located in the river valley.

The source of the Viled is in the eastern part of Vilegodsky District. The Viled initially flows east, towards the Komi Republic. Before reaching the border, it turns north and enters Lensky District. Downstream from the confluence with the Luch it turns west, and eventually south-west and re-enters Vilegodsky District. Below the confluence of the Velikaya Okhta the river valley is heavily populated, with three main areas located around the villages of Fominsky, Vilegodsk, and Ilyinsko-Podomskoye. Between Vilegodsk and Ilyinsko-Podomskoye, the Viled accepts two left tributaries, the Pyela and the Nylozhka, and turns in the north-western direction. The mouth of the Viled is located east of the town of Koryazhma.
