= Kochnegovskaya =

Kochnegovskaya Кочнеговская
- Village
- Location within Arkhangelsk Oblast Location within Russia
- Coordinates: 61°15′N 47°41′E
- Country: Russia
- Region: Arkhangelsk Oblast
- District: Vilegodsky District
- Time zone: UTC+3:00

Kochnegovskaya (Russian: Кочнеговская) is a rural locality (a village) in Nikolskoye Rural Settlement of Vilegodsky District, Arkhangelsk Oblast, Russia. The population was 11 as of 2010.

== Geography ==
Kochnegovskaya is located 27 km northwest of Ilyinsko-Podomskoye (the district's administrative centre) by road. Koltas is the nearest rural locality.
