= Solvychegodsk =

Town in Arkhangelsk Oblast, Russia

Solvychegodsk Сольвычегодск
- Town
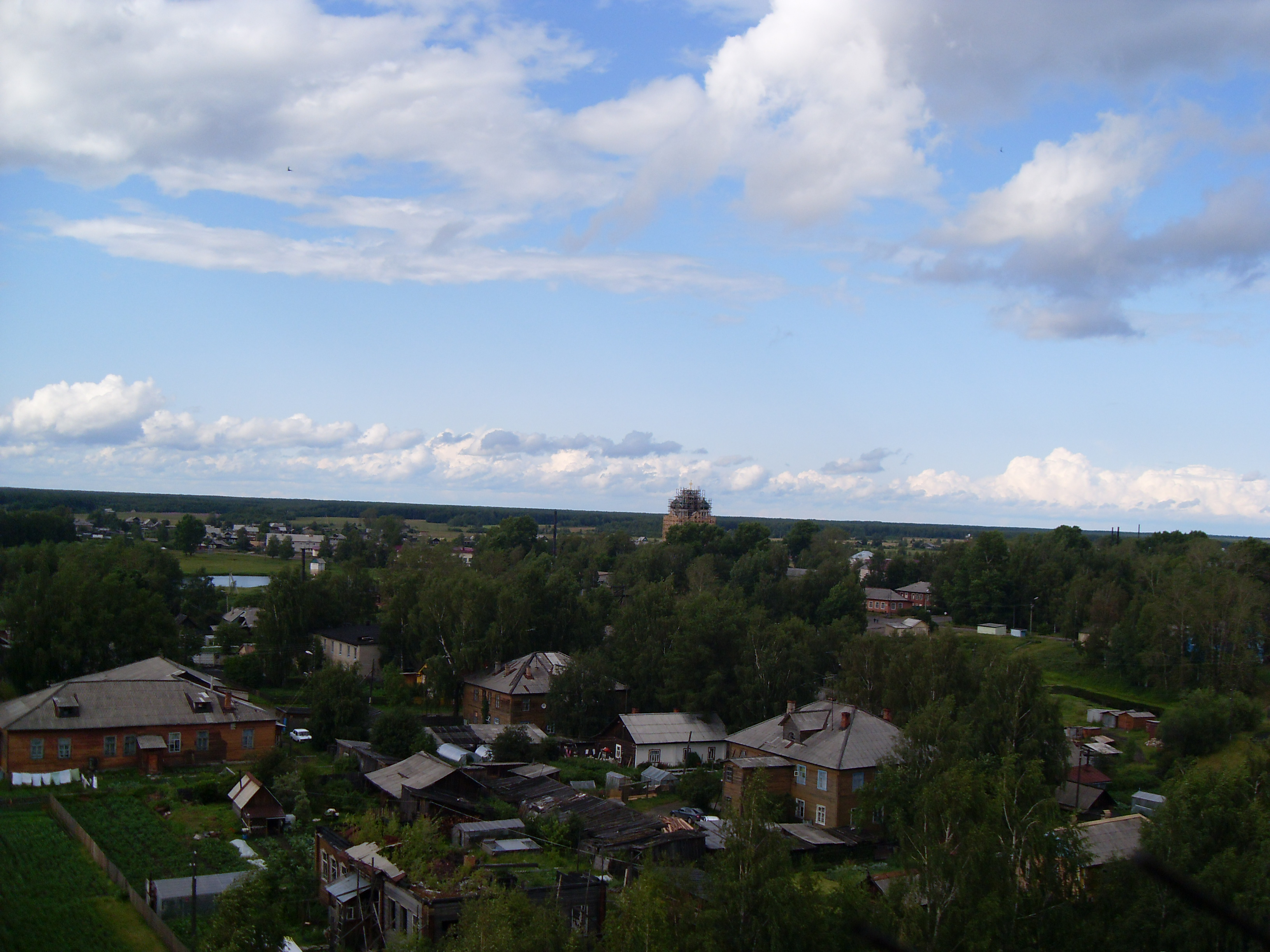
- Northeastern view of Solvychegodsk

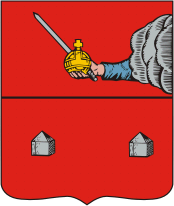
- Coat of arms
- Interactive map of Solvychegodsk
- Location of Solvychegodsk Solvychegodsk (Arkhangelsk Oblast)
- Coordinates: 61°20′N 46°55′E
- Country: Russia
- Federal subject: Arkhangelsk Oblast
- Administrative district: Kotlassky District
- Town of district significanceSelsoviet: Solvychegodsk
- Founded: 14th century
- Elevation: 70 m (230 ft)

Population (2010 Census)
  - Total: 2,460
  - Estimate (2025): 1,768 (−28.1%)

Administrative status
  - Capital of: town of district significance of Solvychegodsk

Municipal status
  - Municipal district: Kotlassky Municipal District
  - Urban settlement: Solvychegodskoye Urban Settlement
  - Capital of: Solvychegodskoye Urban Settlement
- Time zone: UTC+3 (MSK)
- Postal code: 165330
- Dialing code: +7 81837
- OKTMO ID: 11627104001

Solvychegodsk (Russian: Сольвычего́дск, lit. 'salt on the Vychegda') is a town in Kotlassky District of Arkhangelsk Oblast, Russia, located on the right-hand bank of the Vychegda River, about 25 kilometers (16 mi) northeast of Kotlas, the administrative center of the district. Population: 2,460 (2010 census); 2,843 (2002 census); 4,004 (1989 Soviet census).

== History ==
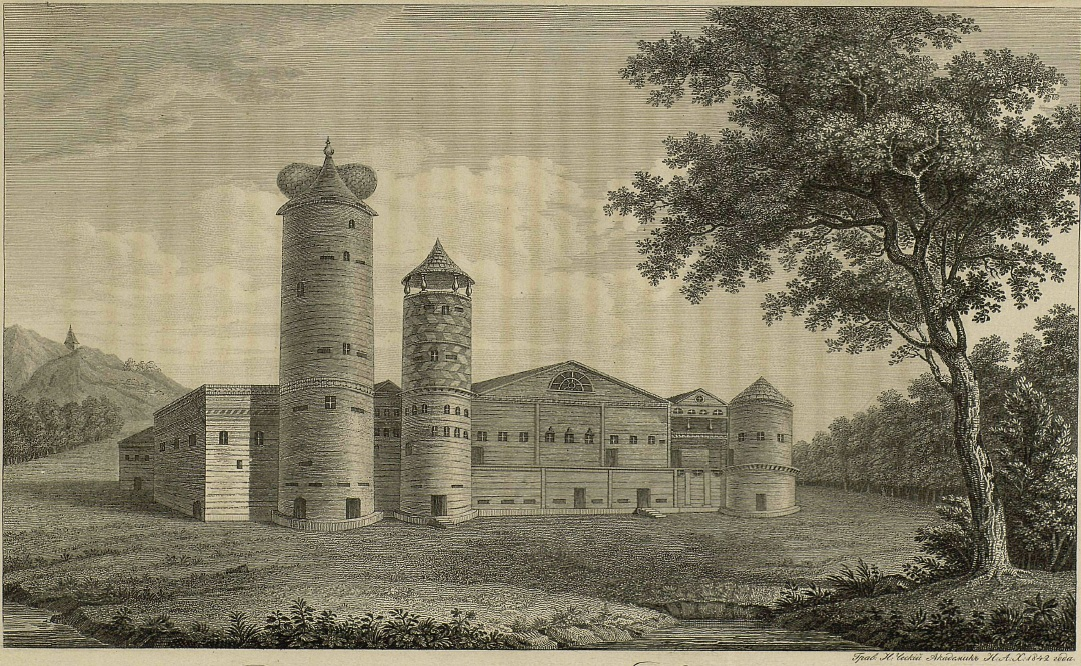
17th century Stroganov country house in Solvychegodsk

Solvychegodsk was founded in the 14th century on the shores of Lake Solyonoye. The locality was known as Usolye posad or Usolsk in the 15th century. Anikey Stroganov (1488–1570) began salt production in 1515, which later became a huge industry, and started the Stroganov family fortune. In the 16th–17th centuries, Solvychegodsk was a big commercial, handicraft, and cultural hub of Northern Russia. It was especially famous for its enamel industry. Solvychegodsk was captured and looted by Polish-Lithuanian vagabonds, the Lisowczycy, on January 22, 1613. In 1796, the town became a part of Vologda Governorate. It was also known as a place of political exile. Joseph Stalin was exiled here for seven months after being arrested by the Okhrana in March 1908 and for another seventeen months in 1911.

In 1937, Solvychegodsk was transferred to the jurisdiction of the Arkhangelsk Oblast.

In 1992 the bodies of peasants who died in 1930 in transit from Kotlas into exile were reburied in a common grave in the town cemetery. A memorial was added two years later.

== Administrative and municipal status ==
Within the framework of administrative divisions, it is incorporated within Kotlassky District as the town of district significance of Solvychegodsk. As a municipal division, the town of district significance of Solvychegodsk, together with the territories of Pacheozersky, Peschansky, Solvychegodsky, and Kharitonovsky Selsoviets (which comprise, correspondingly, twenty-five, twelve, forty, and sixteen rural localities, for the total of ninety-three rural localities) in Kotlassky District, is incorporated within Kotlassky Municipal District as Solvychegodskoye Urban Settlement.

== Economy ==
The Vychegda in Solvychegodsk is navigable, and in summer there is regular passenger navigation connecting Kotlas and Soyga (located approximately halfway between Solvychegodsk and Yarensk).

There is no railway in Solvychegodsk. The Solvychegodsk railway station is actually located in the urban-type settlement of Vychegodsky, on the line connecting Kotlas and Vorkuta at the other side of the Vychegda.

There is a car and passenger ferry to the right bank of the Vychegda River. The ferry is connected by an unpaved road with the paved road between Kotlas and Koryazhma. There is also an unpaved road upstream along the Vychegda, heading to Yarensk.

== Culture and recreation ==
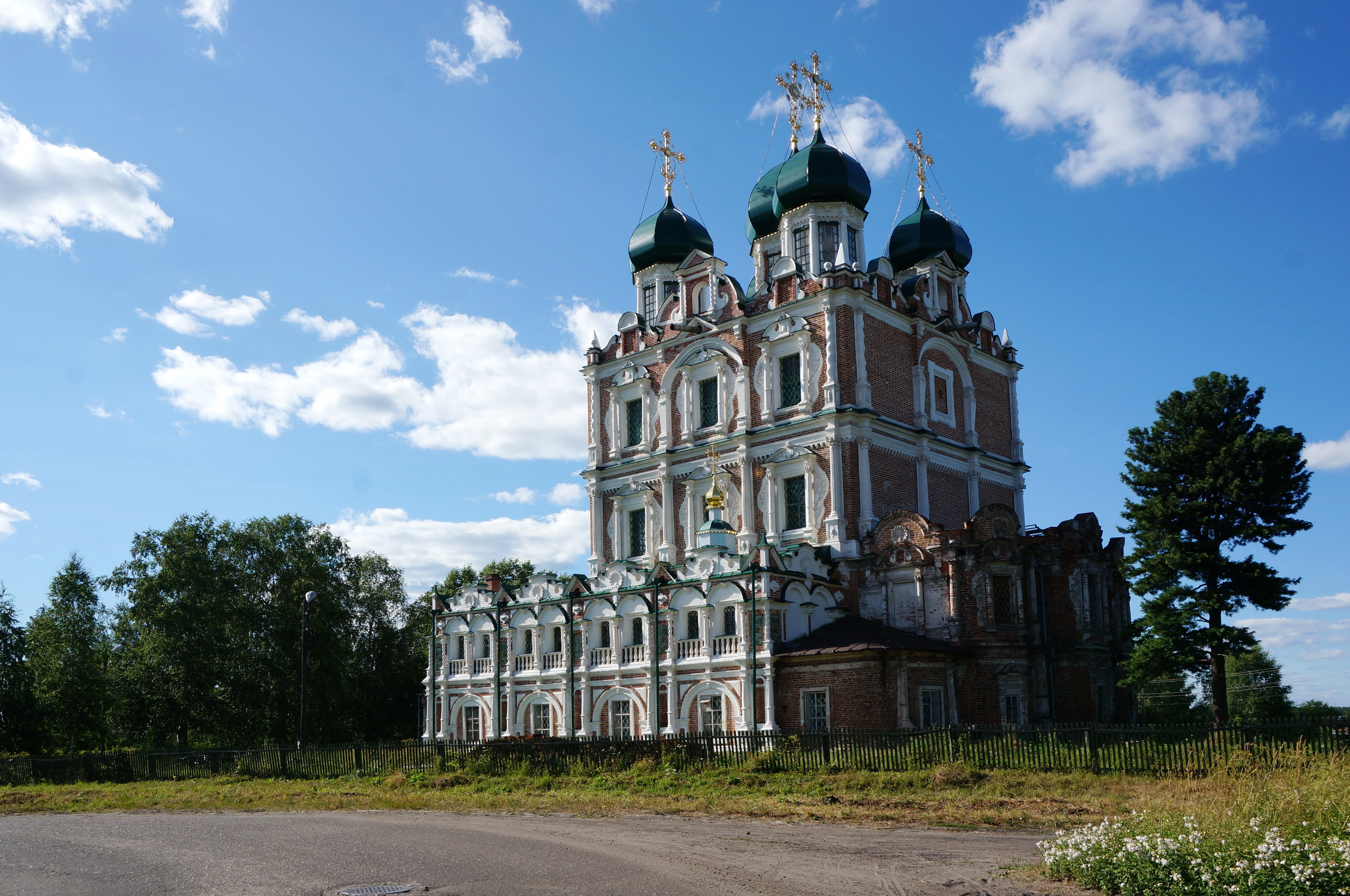
The Presentation Cathedral in Solvychegodsk

Nine objects of cultural heritage protected at the federal level and additionally thirty-three monuments of history and architecture of local importance are located in the town. The federal list of cultural heritage includes the following ensembles:

- former Presentation Monastery, including the Presentation Cathedral (1688–1712), one of the five surviving Stroganov baroque churches
- former Annunciation Cathedral (1560–1584) with the adjacent bell-tower
- Church of the Holy Mandylion (Spaso-Obydenskaya Church, 1691–1697)
- Pyankov House (19th century)

The town of Solvychegodsk is classified as a historical town by the Ministry of Culture of the Russian Federation, which implies certain restrictions on construction in the historical center.

The only state museum in the town, the Solvychegodsk Museum of Art and History, is housed in the former Annunciation Cathedral. There is also a small private museum devoted to the fictional author, Kozma Prutkov, who, according to his official biography, was born in Solvychegodsk.

The town is home to a number of balneological resorts, where mineral springs and silt mud from the Lake Solyanoye are used.
