= Vychegodsky =

Vychegodsky Вычегодский
- Work settlement
- Interactive map of Vychegodsky
- Location of Vychegodsky Vychegodsky (Arkhangelsk Oblast)
- Coordinates: 61°14′44″N 46°52′27″E
- Country: Russia
- Federal subject: Arkhangelsk Oblast
- Founded: 1942

Population (2010 Census)
  - Total: 12,861
  - Estimate (2025): 10,673 (−17%)

Administrative status
  - Subordinated to: town of oblast significance of Kotlas

Municipal status
  - Urban okrug: Kotlas Urban Okrug
- Time zone: UTC+3 (MSK)
- Postal code: 165340
- OKTMO ID: 11710000056

Vychegodsky (Russian: Вычегодский) is an urban locality (a work settlement) under the administrative jurisdiction of the town of oblast significance of Kotlas in Arkhangelsk Oblast, Russia. It is located in the southeast of the oblast on the left bank of the Vychegda River, 15 kilometers (9.3 mi) east of Kotlas. Population: 12,861 (2010 census); 13,435 (2002 census); 14,491 (1989 Soviet census).

== History ==
Vychegodsky was founded in 1942 in connection with the construction of the North-Pechora trunk-railway. There are three secondary schools and one vocational technical school there.

== Economy ==
=== Transportation ===
There is a railway station in Vychegodsky, called Solvychegodsk, on the railroad connecting Kotlas and Vorkuta. Vychegodsky is located on the road connecting Kotlas and Syktyvkar via Koryazhma and Ilyinsko-Podomskoye.

== See also ==
- Administrative divisions of Arkhangelsk Oblast
