= Nikolsk, Arkhangelsk Oblast =

Nikolsk Никольск
- Selo
- Location within Arkhangelsk Oblast Location within Russia
- Coordinates: 61°15′N 47°43′E
- Country: Russia
- Region: Arkhangelsk Oblast
- District: Vilegodsky District
- Time zone: UTC+3:00

Nikolsk (Russian: Никольск) is a rural locality (a selo) in Vilegodsky District, Arkhangelsk Oblast, Russia. The population was 613 as of 2010. There are 16 streets.

== Geography ==
Nikolsk is located 26 km northwest of Ilyinsko-Podomskoye (the district's administrative centre) by road. Kochnegovskaya is the nearest rural locality.
