= Yadrikha =

Yadrikha Ядриха
- Village
- Location within Arkhangelsk Oblast Location within Russia
- Coordinates: 61°11′N 46°30′E
- Country: Russia
- Region: Arkhangelsk Oblast
- District: Kotlassky District
- Time zone: UTC+3:00

Yadrikha (Russian: Ядриха) is a rural locality (a village) in Privodinskoye Urban Settlement of Kotlassky District, Arkhangelsk Oblast, Russia. The population was 175 as of 2010. There are 9 streets.

== Geography ==
Yadrikha is located 15 km southwest of Kotlas (the district's administrative centre) by road. Studenikha is the nearest rural locality.
