= Cheryomushsky =

Cheryomushsky Черёмушский
- Settlement
- Location within Arkhangelsk Oblast Location within Russia
- Coordinates: 61°16′N 47°15′E
- Country: Russia
- Region: Arkhangelsk Oblast
- District: Kotlassky District
- Time zone: UTC+3:00

Cheryomushsky (Russian: Черёмушский) is a rural locality (a settlement) in Cheryomushskoye Rural Settlement of Kotlassky District, Arkhangelsk Oblast, Russia. The population was 1,053 as of 2010. There are 30 streets.

== Geography ==
Cheryomushsky is located 44 km east of Kotlas (the district's administrative centre) by road. Cheremukha is the nearest rural locality.
