= Shiroky Priluk =

Shiroky Priluk Широкий Прилук
- Settlement
- Location within Arkhangelsk Oblast Location within Russia
- Coordinates: 61°07′N 48°50′E
- Country: Russia
- Region: Arkhangelsk Oblast
- District: Vilegodsky District
- Time zone: UTC+3:00

Shiroky Priluk (Russian: Широкий Прилук) is a rural locality (a settlement) in Vilegodsky District, Arkhangelsk Oblast, Russia. The population was 468 as of 2010. There are 11 streets.

== Geography ==
Shiroky Priluk is located 60 km east of Ilyinsko-Podomskoye (the district's administrative centre) by road.
