= Shipitsyno =

Shipitsyno Шипицыно
- Urban-type settlement
- Interactive map of Shipitsyno
- Location of Shipitsyno Shipitsyno (Arkhangelsk Oblast)
- Coordinates: 61°16′57″N 46°30′51″E
- Country: Russia
- Federal subject: Arkhangelsk Oblast
- Administrative district: Kotlassky District
- Elevation: 65 m (213 ft)

Population (2010 Census)
  - Total: 3,452
  - Estimate (2025): 3,684 (+6.7%)

Municipal status
  - Municipal district: Kotlassky Municipal District
  - Urban settlement: Shipitsynskoye Urban Settlement
  - Capital of: Shipitsynskoye Urban Settlement
- Time zone: UTC+3 (MSK)
- Postal code: 165320
- OKTMO ID: 11627180051

Shipitsyno (Russian: Шипи́цыно) is an urban locality (an urban-type settlement) in Kotlassky District of Arkhangelsk Oblast, Russia, located on the left bank of the Northern Dvina River 7 kilometers (4.3 mi) from Kotlas. Municipally, it is the administrative center of Shipitsynskoye Urban Settlement, one of the three urban settlements in the district. Population: 3,452 (2010 census); 3,930 (2002 census); 4,795 (1989 Soviet census)..

== History ==
Shipitsyno was granted urban-type settlement status in 1950.

== Economy ==
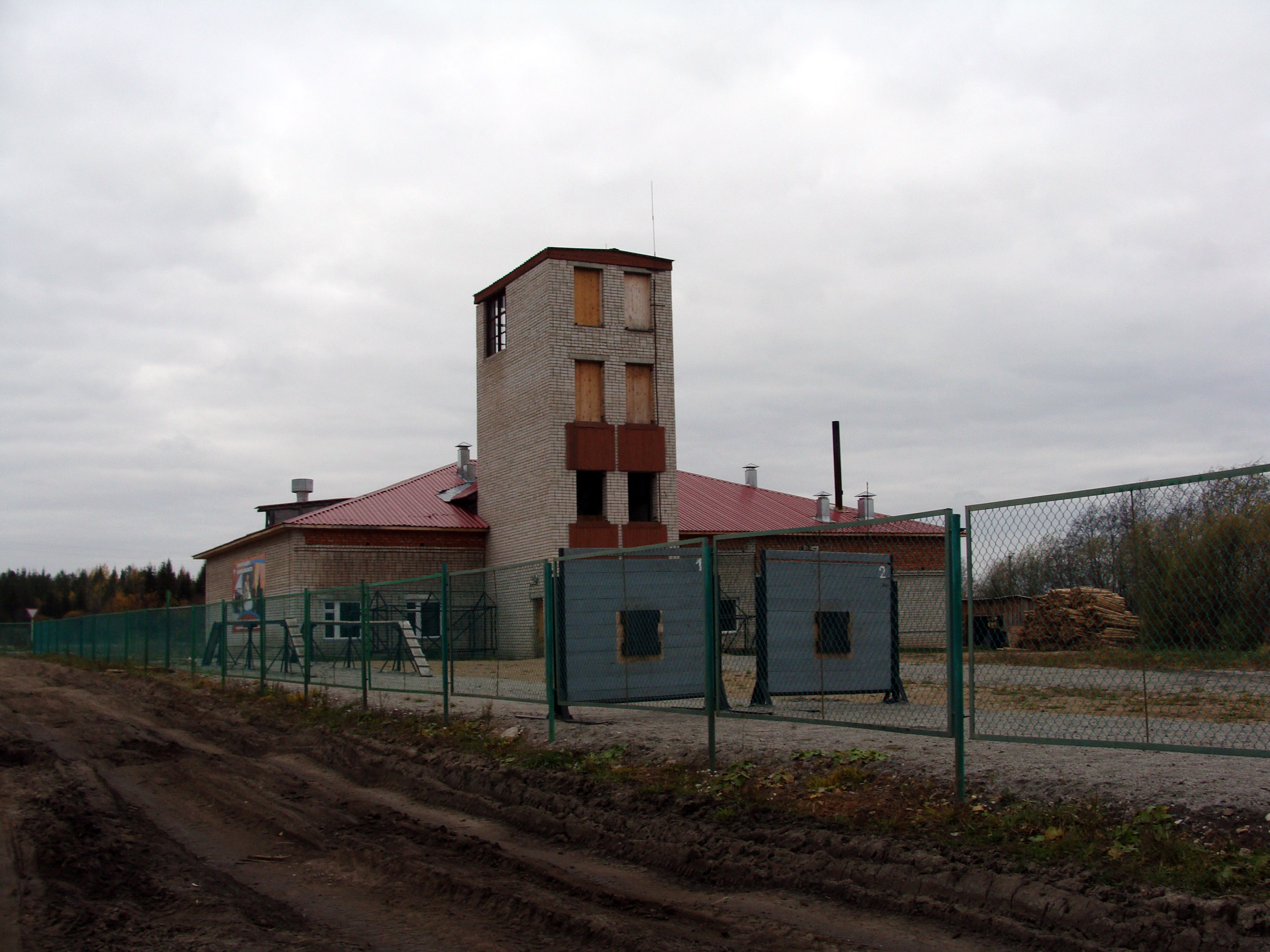
The fire department

=== Industry ===
There is a number of industrial enterprises in Shipitsyno, including the timber industry, concrete production, and mechanical works.

=== Transportation ===
There is a river harbor in Shipitsyno, and the Northern Dvina is navigable, but there is no passenger navigation.

Shipitsyno is located on the road connecting Kotlas and Bereznik via Krasnoborsk. There is a regular bus service on the road; additionally, there is passenger bus traffic from Kotlas which ends in Shipitsyno.
