= Udimsky =

Udimsky Удимский
- Settlement
- Location within Arkhangelsk Oblast Location within Russia
- Coordinates: 61°08′N 45°54′E
- Country: Russia
- Region: Arkhangelsk Oblast
- District: Kotlassky District
- Time zone: UTC+3:00

Udimsky (Russian: Удимский) is a rural locality (a settlement) in Privodinskoye Urban Settlement of Kotlassky District, Arkhangelsk Oblast, Russia. The population was 2,081 as of 2010. There are 37 streets.

== Geography ==
Udimsky is located 55 km southwest of Kotlas (the district's administrative centre) by road. Udima is the nearest rural locality.
