= Koryazhma =

Town in Arkhangelsk Oblast, Russia

Koryazhma Коряжма
- Town
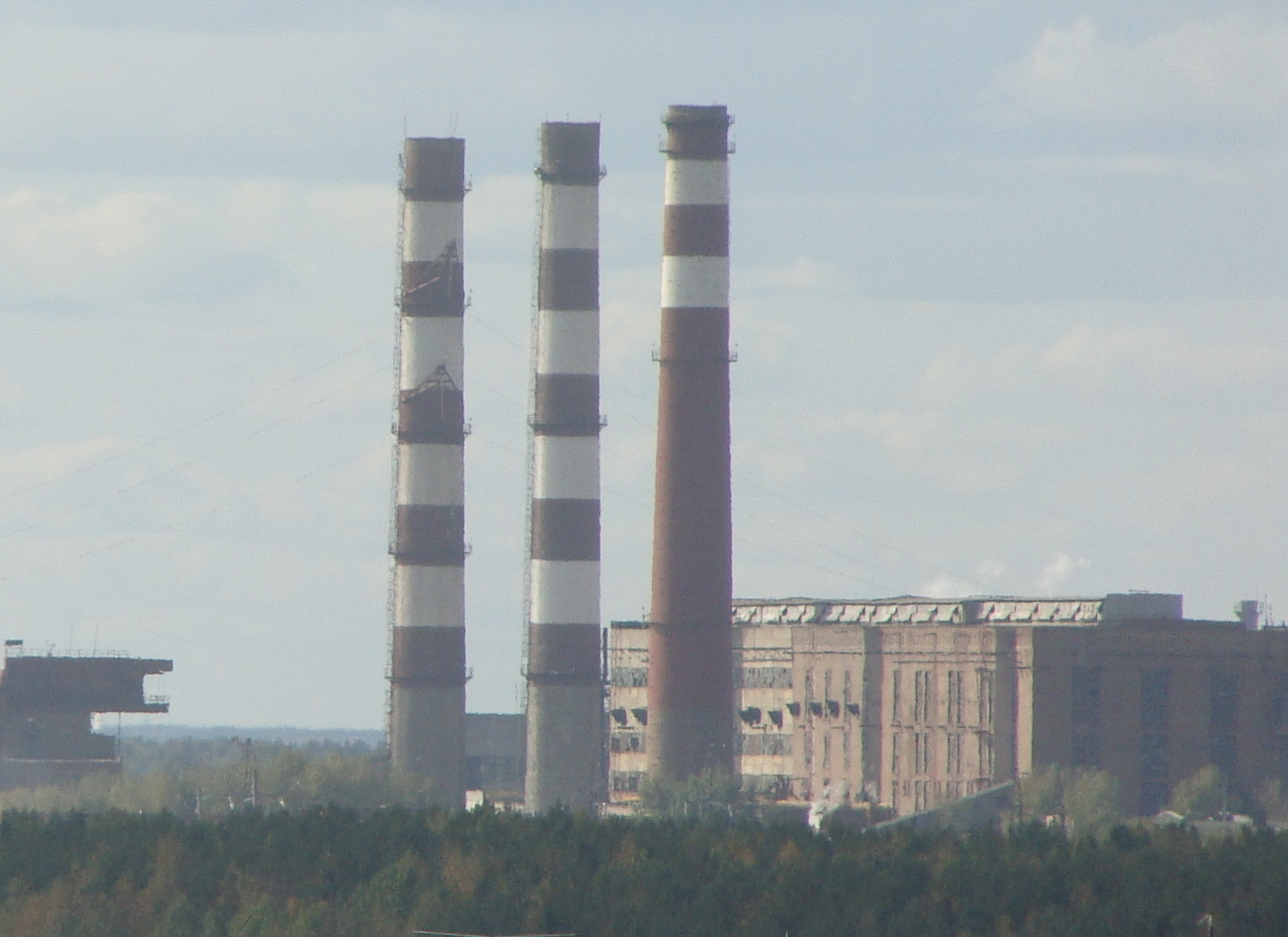

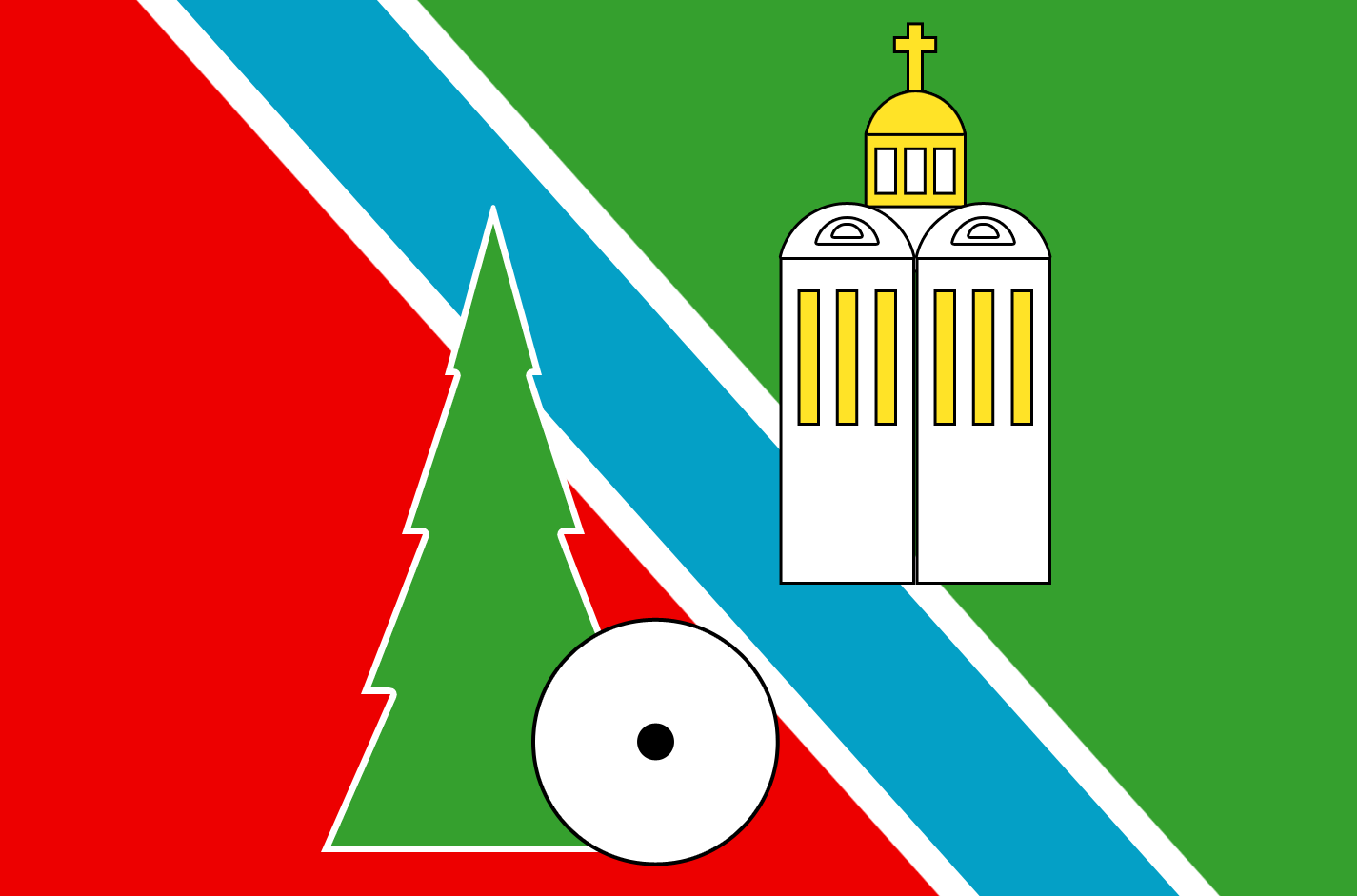
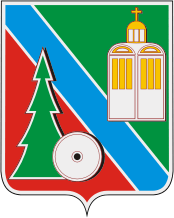
- Flag Coat of arms
- Interactive map of Koryazhma
- Location of Koryazhma Koryazhma (Arkhangelsk Oblast)
- Coordinates: 61°19′N 47°08′E
- Country: Russia
- Federal subject: Arkhangelsk Oblast
- Founded: 1535 (Julian)
- Elevation: 90 m (300 ft)

Population (2010 Census)
  - Total: 39,641
  - Estimate (2023): 34,002 (−14.2%)

Administrative status
  - Subordinated to: town of oblast significance of Koryazhma
  - Capital of: town of oblast significance of Koryazhma, Koryazhemsky Selsoviet

Municipal status
  - Urban okrug: Koryazhma Urban Okrug
  - Capital of: Koryazhma Urban Okrug
- Time zone: UTC+3 (MSK)
- Postal codes: 165650, 165651
- OKTMO ID: 11708000001
- Website: www.koradm.ru

Koryazhma (Russian: Коря́жма) is a town in the southeast of Arkhangelsk Oblast, Russia, located on the left bank of the Vychegda River 30 kilometers (19 mi) east of Kotlas, at the confluence of the Bolshaya Koryazhemka River. Population: 39,641 (2010 census); 42,811 (2002 census); 41,795 (1989 Soviet census).

== History ==
In 1535, the Koryazhemsky Nikolaevsky Monastery was founded in the mouth of the Bolshaya Koryazhemka (hence the name). After the 1917 October Revolution the monastery was abolished, and the territories which previously belonged to the monastery were used for agriculture. In 1953, the construction of a big paper mill started, and in 1954 first brickstone houses were built. In 1957, the settlement around the paper mill was officially designated as the urban-type settlement of Koryazhma. The paper mill started operation in 1961. In 1975, the population of Koryazhma was 42 thousand. August 15, 1985, Koryazhma obtained the town rights and became the town of oblast significance.

== Administrative and municipal status ==
Within the framework of administrative divisions, it is incorporated as the town of oblast significance of Koryazhma—an administrative unit with the status equal to that of the districts. As a municipal division, the town of oblast significance of Koryazhma is incorporated as Koryazhma Urban Okrug.

Even though Koryazhma is not a part of Kotlassky District (by which it is geographically surrounded), it serves as the administrative center of Koryazhemsky Selsoviet, one of the twelve selsoviets into which that district is divided.

== Economy ==
=== Industry ===
Koryazhma is home of the Koryazhma Branch of the Ilim Group company, the largest chemical pulp and paper mills in Europe (previously Kotlas Pulp and Paper Mill).

=== Transportation ===
The Vychegda in Koryazhma is navigable, and in summer there is regular passenger navigation connecting Kotlas and Soyga (located approximately halfway between Koryazhma and Yarensk).

There is a railway station (Nizovka) on the line connecting Kotlas and Vorkuta.

Koryazhma is located on the road connecting Kotlas and Syktyvkar (via Shiroky Priluk). This portion of the road is paved. There is regular passenger bus traffic from Koryazhma to Kotlas, Veliky Ustyug, and Syktyvkar.

== Culture and recreation ==
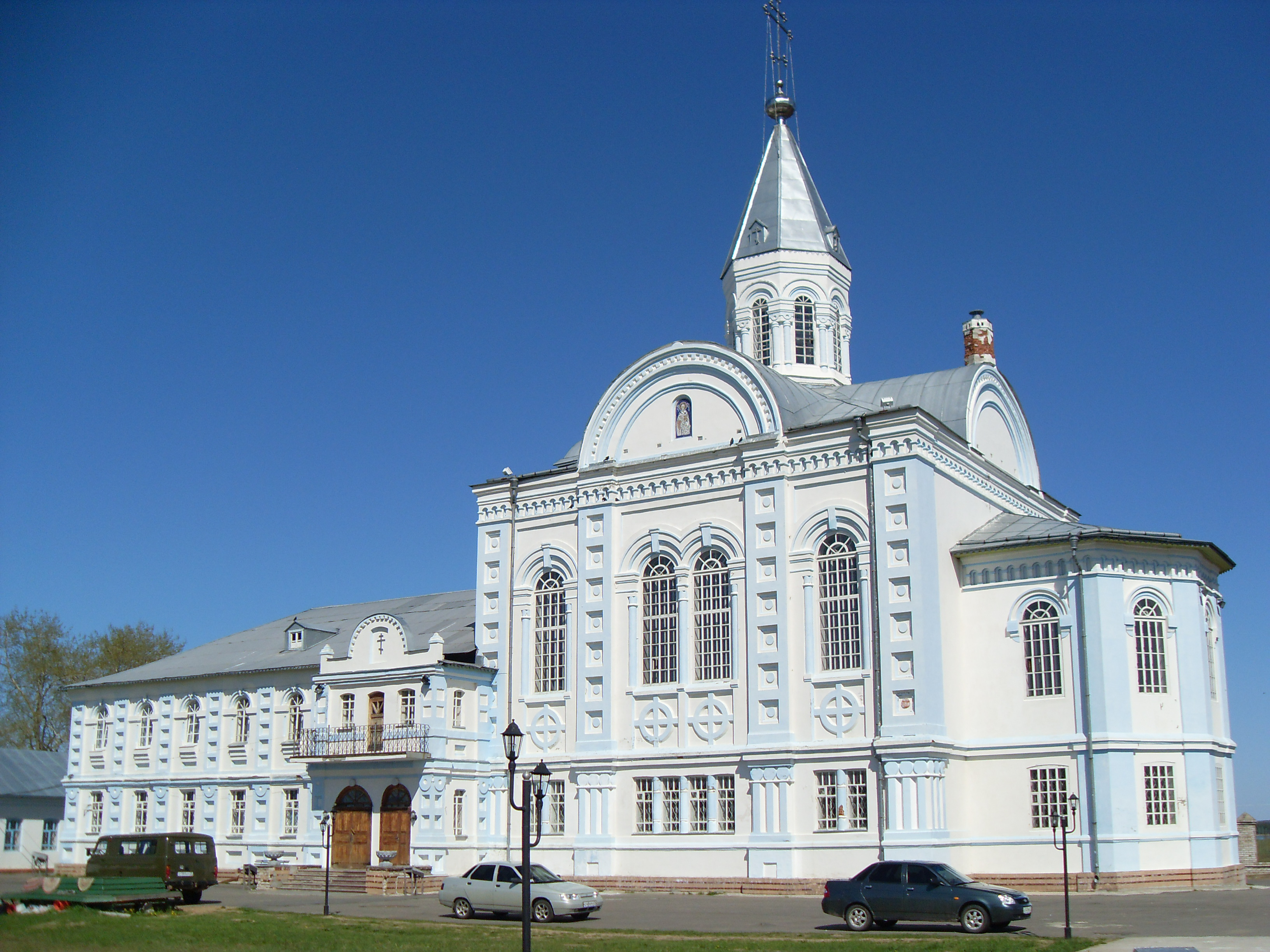
Church of Saint Longin

The only collection of historical buildings in Koryazhma is in the Koryazhemsky Nikolaevsky Monastery. The Church of the Holy Mandylion originates from 1746 and is one of the oldest stone churches in Arkhangelsk Oblast, and the Church of Saint Longin of Koryazhma, consecrated to the founder of the monastery, was built between 1907 and 1912. There is also the House of the Hegumen which forms a single ensemble with the Church of Saint Longin of Koryazhma. All these buildings are protected as cultural heritage of local importance. The Annunciation Cathedral, the oldest stone building of the monastery (1665), and the bell-tower, were demolished in 1933.

=== Sports ===
The local association football team is FC Khimik Koryazhma.

There is also a bandy team, Vychegda.
