= Soyga =

Soyga (Russian: Сойга) is the name of several rural localities in Arkhangelsk Oblast, Russia:

- Soyga, Lensky District, Arkhangelsk Oblast, a settlement in Soyginsky Selsoviet of Lensky District
- Soyga, Verkhnetoyemsky District, Arkhangelsk Oblast, a settlement in Soyginsky Selsoviet of Verkhnetoyemsky District
