= Annunciation Cathedral, Solvychegodsk =

Coordinates: 61.3273°N 46.9233°E

Annunciation Cathedral
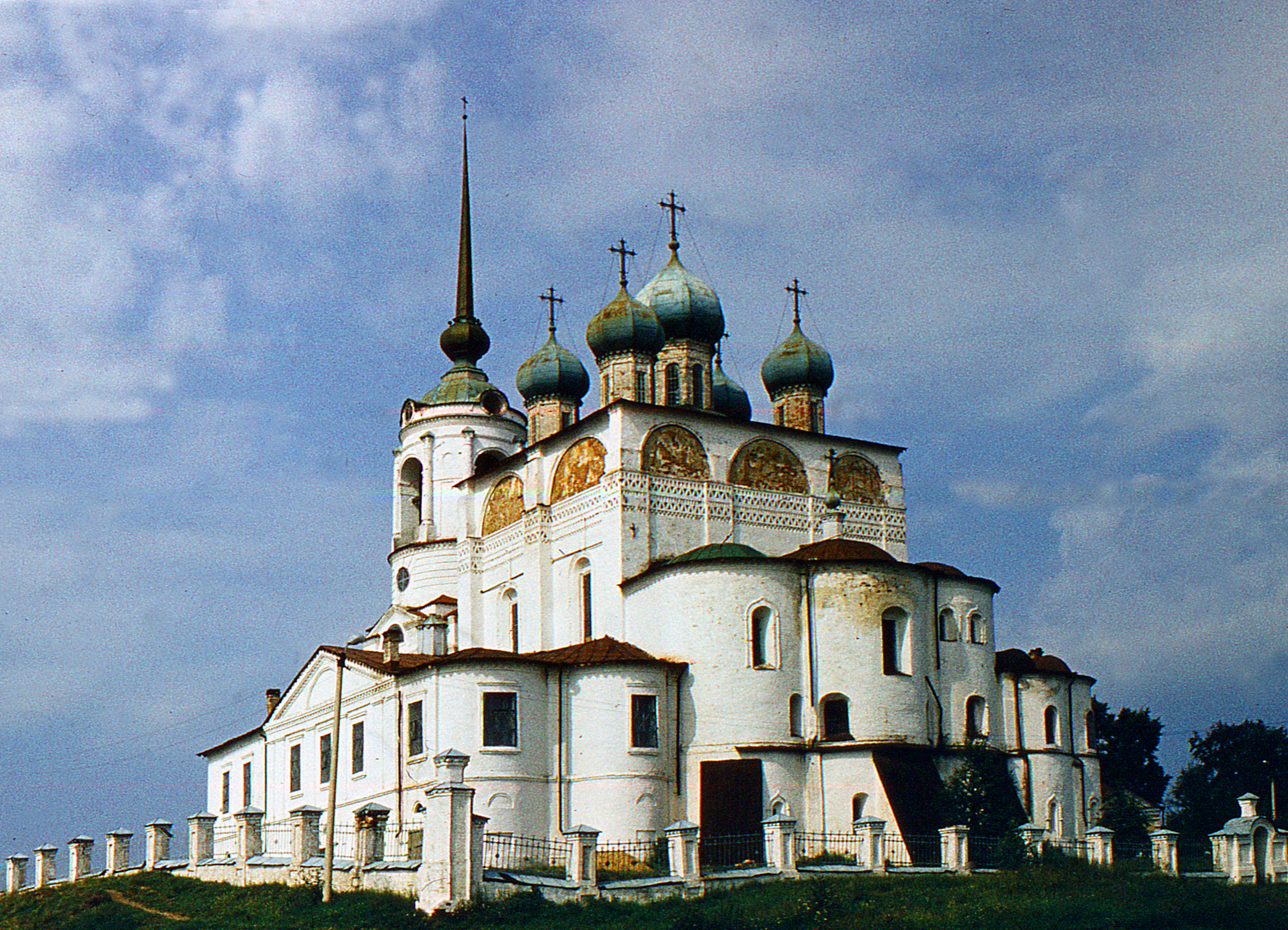
- The Annunciation Cathedral in Solvychegodsk

Religion
- Affiliation: Russian Orthodox
- Ecclesiastical or organizational status: Museum
- Year consecrated: 1584

Location
- Location: Solvychegodsk, Arkhangelsk Oblast, Russia
- Country: Russia
- Interactive map of Annunciation Cathedral

Architecture
- Type: Cathedral
- Funded by: Anikey Stroganov
- Groundbreaking: 1560
- Completed: 1570s
- Materials: Brick

The Annunciation Cathedral (Russian: Благовещенский собор) in Solvychegodsk (Arkhangelsk Oblast of Russia) is a major masonry church built in the Russian North during the reign of Ivan the Terrible. Commissioned by Anikey Stroganov, it was the first large brick structure in the city, standing in stark contrast to the surrounding log buildings. Construction began in 1560 and finished in the early 1570s, with formal consecration taking place in 1584. Although traditionally referred to as a "cathedral", just like the Solvychegodsk's other major religious building, the Presentation Cathedral, it never functioned as an actual seat of a bishop. The structure was originally built as a private church for the Stroganovs, later operated as a parish church, and has served as a museum since 1919.

The building reflects a Russian Baroque variation frequently called the Stroganov style that was widespread in an area stretching from Solvychegodsk to Nizhnii Novgorod to Perm where the Stroganovs has commercial presence.

The grounds to the northwest of the cathedral served as the Stroganovs' burial place. There are a total of 28 gravestones dating from the 16th to the 17th century, and a small mausoleum built in the 1820s.

== Architecture ==
The cathedral's architecture uses two interior piers (Russian: "двустолпный") instead of the typical four, which gives the exterior a truncated appearance. Тhe five cupolas were standard on major sixteenth-century churches. The unknown Stroganov master builders, who may have come from Rostov, placed the main dome directly over the two massive piers, while the four flanking domes are supported by vaulted arches. A large apsidal structure for the altar serves as a buttress for the east wall, where the load stress is most significant.

In later centuries, the curved spaces between the cathedral's semicircular gables were bricked in to support a simpler sloped roof, a common modification that made maintenance easier but detracted from the building's original picturesque form. The thick lower parts of the brick walls housed secure storage space for valuable goods such as fur pelts and precious church objects.

== Bell tower ==
Originally, a magnificent bell tower containing its own altar stood at the northwest corner of the cathedral's exterior gallery. It housed twelve bells, the largest of which weighed over three tons. The original tower eventually fell into disrepair and was replaced between 1819 and 1826 with a neoclassical bell tower that overshadowed the medieval church's form. Only a few of the original Stroganov bells have survived.

== Interior and art ==
The interior of the cathedral was decorated with frescoes in the summer of 1600. However, these were overpainted during the 18th and 19th centuries, especially following an 1819 fire. While restoration efforts beginning in the 1970s revealed some original frescoes on the west wall, the majority of the original paintings are irretrievably lost.

The centerpiece of the interior is an elaborate, five-tiered iconostasis. The original was installed by the late 1570s and featured over 70 icons, though few survive today. The iconostasis was rebuilt several times in the 17th century; its current form dates to the 1690s, while the Royal Gates were a Stroganov donation from the early 17th century.

The cathedral housed highly valuable objects crafted by Stroganov workshops, whose masters were renowned throughout Russia. These items included embroidered fabrics, chalices, jewel-encrusted Bible covers, enameled items.

== History ==
During the Time of Troubles, the cathedral suffered damage. In January 1613, a force of approximately 3,000 Poles and renegade Cossacks surprised Solvychegodsk. While the Stroganovs had successfully defended their walled compound, the attackers stormed and sacked the trading district and the Annunciation Cathedral itself.

== Sources ==
- Brumfield, William Craft (February–March 1999). "The City that Salt Built". Russian Life. 42: 36–43.
- Brumfield, William C. (n.d.). "Solvychegodsk: The Capital of the Stroganovs". cultinfo.ru.
