= Ilyinsko-Podomskoye =

Ilyinsko-Podomskoye Ильинско-Подомское
- Selo
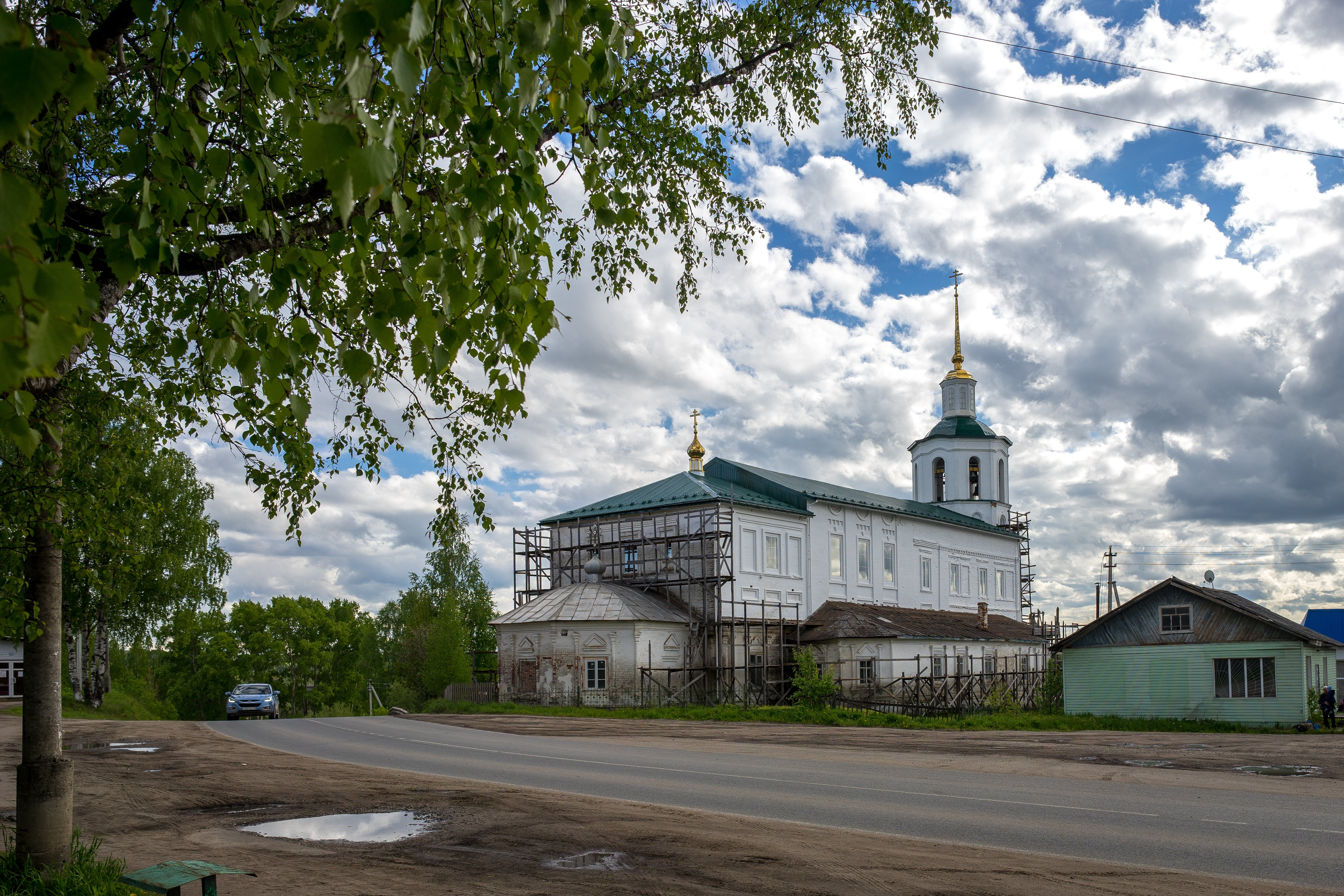
- Church of Elijah the Prophet
- Interactive map of Ilyinsko-Podomskoye
- Location of Ilyinsko-Podomskoye Ilyinsko-Podomskoye (Arkhangelsk Oblast)
- Coordinates: 61°07′00″N 47°58′32″E
- Country: Russia
- Federal subject: Arkhangelsk Oblast
- Administrative district: Vilegodsky District
- Selsoviet: Ilyinsky Selsoviet

Population (2010 Census)
  - Total: 3,682
  - Estimate (2021): 2,961 (−19.6%)

Administrative status
  - Capital of: Vilegodsky District, Ilyinsky Selsoviet

Municipal status
  - Municipal district: Vilegodsky Municipal District
  - Rural settlement: Ilyinskoye Rural Settlement
  - Capital of: Vilegodsky Municipal District, Ilyinskoye Rural Settlement
- Time zone: UTC+3 (MSK)
- Postal code: 165680
- OKTMO ID: 11611412101

Ilyinsko-Podomskoye (Russian: Ильи́нско-Подо́мское) is a rural locality (a selo) and the administrative center of Vilegodsky District of Arkhangelsk Oblast, Russia, located on the right bank of the Viled River. It also serves as the administrative center of Ilyinsky Selsoviet, one of the ten selsoviets into which the district is administratively divided. Municipally, it is the administrative center of Ilyinskoye Rural Settlement. Population: 3,682 (2010 census); 2,973 (2002 census); 3,365 (1989 Soviet census).

== History ==
The area was populated by speakers of Uralic languages and then colonized by the Novgorod Republic. Eventually, the area became a part of the Grand Duchy of Moscow. Ilyinsk (Ilyinsky Pogost, currently a part of Ilyinsko-Podomskoye) was founded in 1379. The foundation of the pogost is often credited to the activities of Stephen of Perm, who is credited by the conversion of Komi peoples to Christianity. In the end of 14th century, the lands along Viled River (including Ilyinsky Pogost) were given to Stephen, at the time the hegumen in the Ust-Vym Monastery, by Dmitry Donskoy, the Prince of Moscow.

The Stroganov family, which was based in Solvychegodsk and made their fortune by the salt production, had a number of estates on the Viled, which were user to grow horses for the salt production. The biggest Stroganov estate on the Viled was in Ilyinsk.

In the 16th and 17th centuries, Ilyinsk became a fortress due to its location on the main road from Moscow to Siberia, which went from Moscow to Veliky Ustyug and then to Cherdyn. The records show that in the 17th century Ilyinsk had two wooden churches. One of the first public schools in the North of Russia was opened here in 1848.

Ilyinsko-Podomskoye was created by merging Ilyinsk with the adjacent village of Podoma. Ilyinsko-Podomskaya Volost already existed in the 18th century.

Prior to 1918, the area of the present-day Vilegodsky District was a part of Solvychegodsky Uyezd. In 1918, the area moved to the newly established Northern Dvina Governorate, and in 1924 the uyezds were abolished in favor of the new divisions, the districts (raions). Vilegodsky District was established on April 10, 1924, with the district center located in Ilyinsko-Podomskoye.

== Economy ==
=== Industry ===
Traditionally, the valley of the Viled River was producing linum, and in 1930 the first linum factory in present-day Arkhangelsk Oblast opened in Ilyinsko-Podomskoye.

=== Transportation ===
Ilyinsko-Podomskoye is located on the road connecting Kotlas and Syktyvkar (via Shiroky Priluk). This portion of the road is paved. There is regular passenger bus traffic from Ilyinsko-Podomskoye to Kotlas, Koryazhma, Veliky Ustyug, and Syktyvkar, as well as local traffic to the villages of Vilegodsky District.

== Culture and recreation ==
St. Iliya Church in Ilyinsko-Podomskoye is designated as an architectural monument and is protected at the local level. This is a two-floor stone church built in 1789.

Ilyinsko-Podomskoye hosts the Vilegodsky District Museum.
