= Vilegodsky District =

Vilegodsky District Вилегодский район (Russian)
- District
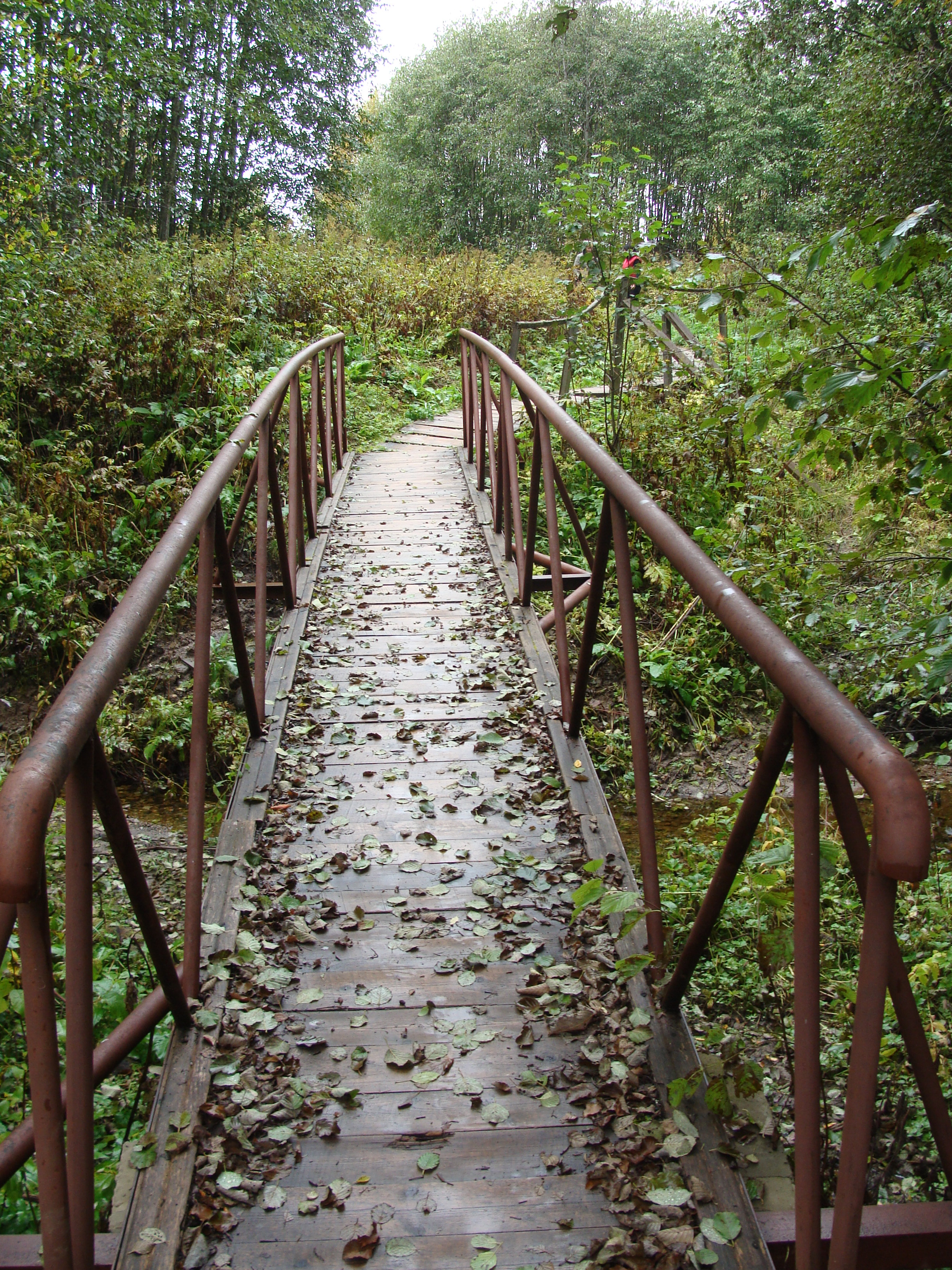
- The Cheryomushka River

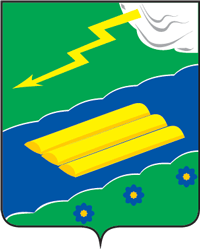
- Flag Coat of arms
- Location of Vilegodsky District in Arkhangelsk Oblast
- Coordinates: 61°07′N 47°59′E
- Country: Russia
- Federal subject: Arkhangelsk Oblast
- Established: April 10, 1924
- Administrative center: Ilyinsko-Podomskoye

Area
  - Total: 6,300 km^{2} (2,400 sq mi)

Population (2010 Census)
  - Total: 11,158
  - Density: 1.8/km^{2} (4.6/sq mi)
  - Urban: 0%
  - Rural: 100%

Administrative structure
  - Administrative divisions: 6 selsoviet
  - Inhabited localities: 177 rural localities

Municipal structure
  - Municipally incorporated as: Vilegodsky Municipal District
  - Municipal divisions: 0 urban settlements, 6 rural settlements
- Time zone: UTC+3 (MSK)
- OKTMO ID: 11611000
- Website: http://виледь.рф/

Vilegodsky District (Russian: Вилего́дский райо́н) is an administrative district (raion), one of the twenty-one in Arkhangelsk Oblast, Russia. Municipally, it is incorporated as Vilegodsky Municipal District. It is located in the southeast of the oblast and borders with Lensky District in the north, Sysolsky and Priluzsky Districts of the Komi Republic in the east, Luzsky District of Kirov Oblast in the south, and with Kotlassky District in the west. Its administrative center is the rural locality (a selo) of Ilyinsko-Podomskoye. District's population: 11,158 (2010 census); 13,241 (2002 census); 16,616 (1989 Soviet census). The population of Ilyinsko-Podomskoye accounts for 33.0% of the district's total population.

== History ==
The area was populated by speakers of Uralic languages and then colonized by the Novgorod Republic. In the end of the 14th century, the area became a part of the Grand Duchy of Moscow. Ilyinsk (currently a part of Ilyinsko-Podomskoye) was founded in 1379. The foundation of the village is often related to the activities of Stephen of Perm, who is credited with the conversion of the Komi peoples to Christianity. After 1380, the lands along the Viled River were given to Stephen, at the time the hegumen in the Ust-Vym Monastery, by Dmitry Donskoy, the Prince of Moscow.

In the course of the administrative reform carried out in 1708 by Peter the Great, the area was included into Archangelgorod Governorate, In 1780, the governorate was abolished and transformed into Vologda Viceroyalty, which in 1796 was split. The area was included into Vologda Governorate. From 1780, the area of the present-day Vilegodsky District was a part of Solvychegodsky Uyezd. In 1918, the area was transferred to the newly established Northern Dvina Governorate, and in 1924 the uyezds were abolished in favor of the new divisions, the districts (raions). Vilegodsky District was established on April 10, 1924.

In the following years, the first-level administrative division of Russia kept changing. In 1929, Northern Dvina Governorate was merged into Northern Krai, which in 1936 was transformed into Northern Oblast. In 1937, Northern Oblast was split into Arkhangelsk Oblast and Vologda Oblast. Krasnoborsky District remained in Arkhangelsk Oblast ever since. Some areas of the district were eventually transferred to Kirov Oblast, Lensky, and Kotlassky Districts.

== Geography ==
The district is located on the left bank of the Vychegda River. A major part of the district belongs to the basin of the Vychegda, mainly to the Viled River which is a major left tributary of the Vychegda. A small portion of the Vychegda course serves as a boundary of the district in the northwest. A small area in the southwest of the district drains into the Lala River, a tributary of the Luza River, in the basin of the Yug.

Almost the whole of the district is covered by coniferous forests (taiga).

== Divisions ==
=== Administrative divisions ===
Administratively, the district is divided into six selsoviets. The following selsoviets have been established (the administrative centers are given in parentheses):

- Belyayevsky (Shalimovo);
- Ilyinsky (Ilyinsko-Podomskoye);
- Nikolsky (Nikolsk);
- Pavlovsky (Pavlovsk);
- Selyansky (Fominsky);
- Vilegodsky (Vilegodsk).

=== Municipal divisions ===
Municipally, the district is divided into seven rural settlements (the administrative centers are given in parentheses):

- Belyayevskoye Rural Settlement (Shalimovo)
- Ilyinskoye Rural Settlement (Ilyinsko-Podomskoye)
- Nikolskoye Rural Settlement (Nikolsk)
- Pavlovskoye Rural Settlement (Pavlovsk)
- Selyanskoye Rural Settlement (Fominsky)
- Vilegodskoye Rural Settlement (Vilegodsk)

== Economy ==
=== Industry ===
The main industry of the district is timber production.

Traditionally, the valley of the Viled River was producing linum, and in 1930 the first linum factory in the present-day Arkhangelsk Oblast was open in Ilyinsko-Podomskoye. However, linum has not been cultivated in the district since 1976.

=== Agriculture ===
The farms produce meat, milk, cereals, and potatoes.

=== Transportation ===
The Vychegda River is navigable and with regular passenger navigation.

A road between Kotlas and Syktyvkar traverses the district. In particular, it passes Ilyinsko-Podomskoye.

A portion of the railroad connecting Kotlas and Vorkuta also lies in the district.

== Culture and recreation ==
The district contains seven objects classified as cultural and historical heritage of local importance. Most of these are churches built prior to 1917.

The only state museum in the district is Vilegodsky District Museum located in Ilyinsko-Podomskoye.
