= Kotlassky District =

Kotlassky District Котласский район (Russian)
- District
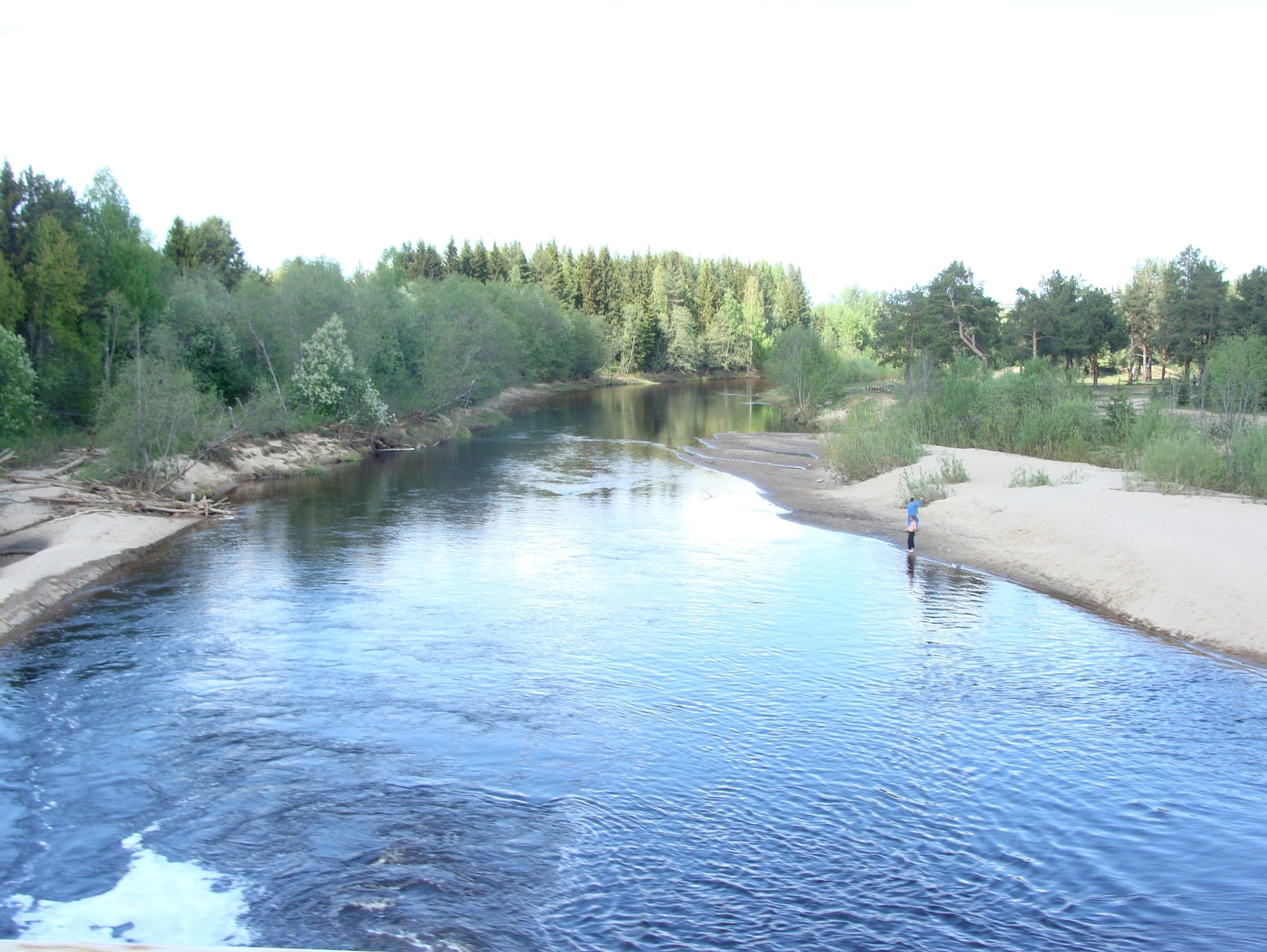
- The Limenda River in Kotlassky District

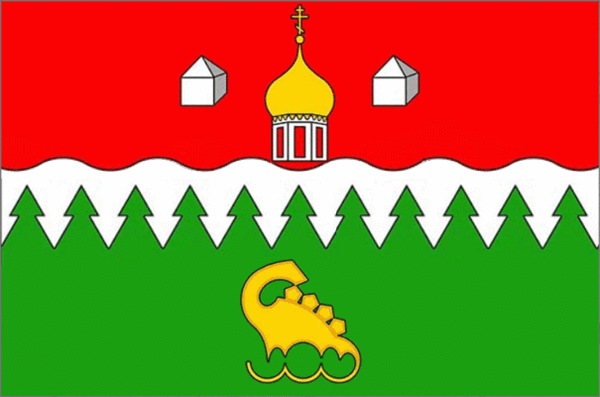
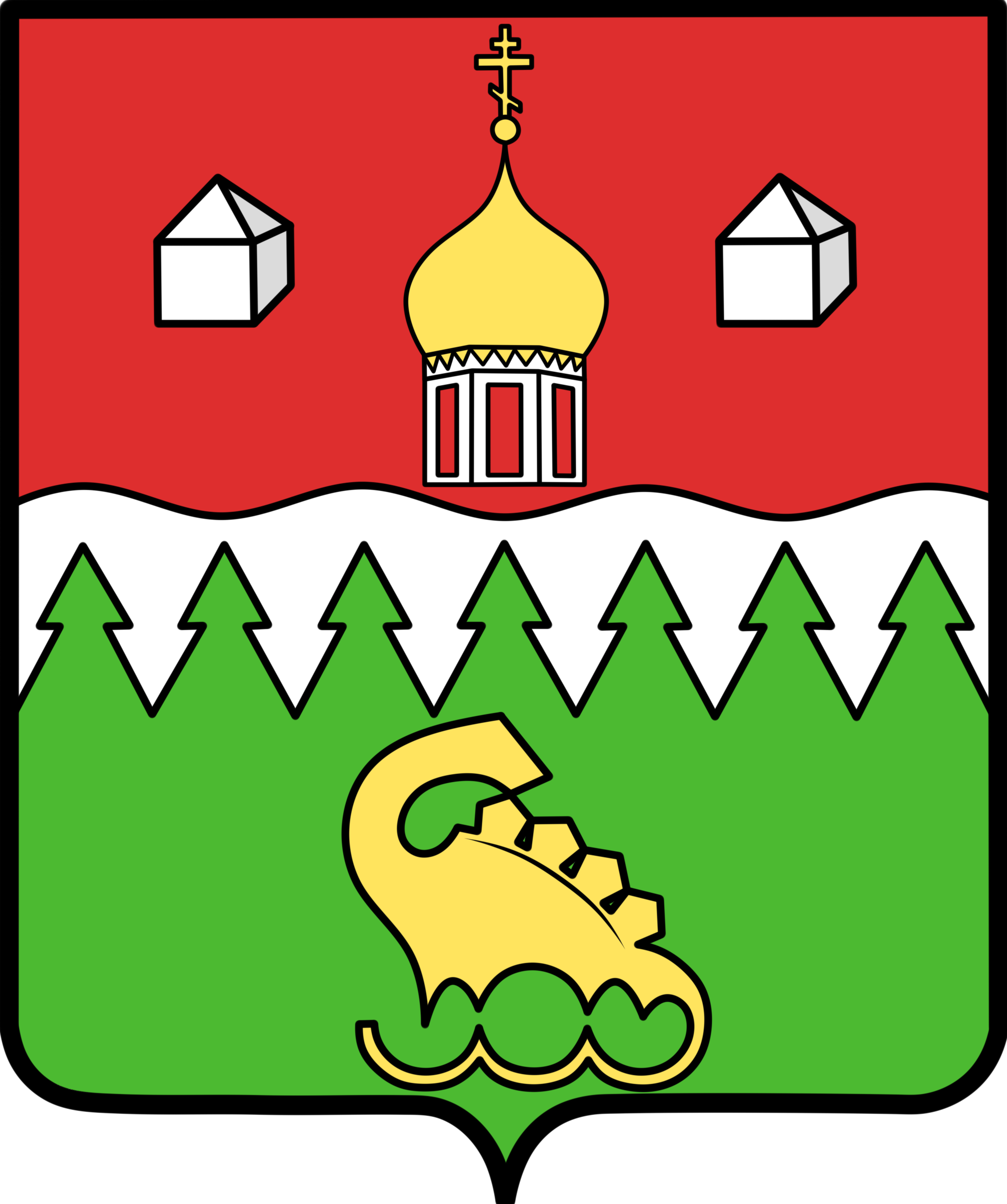
- Flag Coat of arms
- Location of Kotlassky District in Arkhangelsk Oblast
- Coordinates: 61°15′N 46°39′E
- Country: Russia
- Federal subject: Arkhangelsk Oblast
- Established: June 25, 1924
- Administrative center: Kotlas

Area
  - Total: 6,300 km^{2} (2,400 sq mi)

Population (2010 Census)
  - Total: 21,005
  - Density: 3.3/km^{2} (8.6/sq mi)
  - Urban: 43.2%
  - Rural: 56.8%

Administrative structure
  - Administrative divisions: 1 Towns of district significance, 2 Urban-type settlements with jurisdictional territory, 12 Selsoviets
  - Inhabited localities: 1 cities/towns, 2 urban-type settlements, 303 rural localities

Municipal structure
  - Municipally incorporated as: Kotlassky Municipal District
  - Municipal divisions: 3 urban settlements, 1 rural settlements
- Time zone: UTC+3 (MSK)
- OKTMO ID: 11527000
- Website: http://www.kotlasreg.ru/

Kotlassky District (Russian: Ко́тласский райо́н) is an administrative district (raion), one of the twenty-one in Arkhangelsk Oblast, Russia. As a municipal division, it is incorporated as Kotlassky Municipal District. It is located in the southeast of the oblast and borders with Krasnoborsky District in the north, Lensky District in the northeast, Vilegodsky District in the east, Luzsky District of Kirov Oblast and Velikoustyugsky District of Vologda Oblast in the south, and with Ustyansky District in the west. The area of the district is 6,300 square kilometers (2,400 sq mi). Its administrative center is the town of Kotlas (which is not administratively a part of the district). Population: 21,005 (2010 census); 24,964 (2002 census); 32,800 (1989 Soviet census).

== Geography ==
The district is located on both banks of the Northern Dvina and its main right tributary, the Vychegda. The Northern Dvina and the Vychegda divide the district into three comparably sized areas.

A major part of the district belongs to the basins of the Northern Dvina and the Vychegda, including such major tributaries of the Northern Dvina as the Ustya (left) and the Uftyuga (right). The rivers in the southeastern corner of the district (i. e., areas south of the town of Koryazhma) drain into the Lala, a tributary of the Luza, in the basin of the Yug.

Almost the whole territory of the district is covered by coniferous forests (taiga).

== History ==
The area in general was populated by speakers of Uralic languages and then colonized by the Novgorod Republic. Solvychegodsk was founded in the 14th century. After the fall of Novgorod, the area became a part of the Grand Duchy of Moscow.

In the course of the administrative reform carried out in 1708 by Peter the Great, the area was included into Archangelgorod Governorate, and Solvychegodsk was designated as one of the cities. In 1780, the governorate was abolished and transformed into Vologda Viceroyalty. The latter was abolished in 1796, and the part of it which included Solvychegodsk was made into Vologda Governorate. In 1918, the area was transferred to the newly established Northern Dvina Governorate, and in 1924 the uyezds were abolished in favor of the new divisions, the districts (raions).

Kotlassky District was formed on June 25, 1924 and included areas of former Solvychegodsky and Velikoustyugsky Uyezds. In 1928, it was merged with Solvychegodsky District and in 1931, a part of Krasnoborsky District was appended to Kotlassky District.

In the following years, the district remained in the same borders (with the exception of Solvychegodsky District, which was split out in 1938 and merged back in 1958), but the first-level administrative division of Russia kept changing. In 1929, Northern Dvina Governorate was merged into Northern Krai, which in 1936 was transformed into Northern Oblast. In 1937, Northern Oblast was split into Arkhangelsk Oblast and Vologda Oblast. Kotlassky District remained in Arkhangelsk Oblast ever since.

== Administrative and municipal status ==
=== Administrative divisions ===
Within the framework of administrative divisions, Kotlassky District is one of the twenty-one in the oblast. The town of Kotlas serves as its administrative center, despite being incorporated separately as a town of oblast significance—an administrative unit with the status equal to that of the districts. The district is divided into twelve selsoviets, one town of district significance (Solvychegodsk), and two urban-type settlements with jurisdictional territory (Privodino and Shipitsyno). Three other inhabited localities which previously had work settlement status were downgraded to rural status in 2005; these are Cheryomushsky, Kharitonovo, and Udimsky. The following selsoviets have been established (the administrative centers are given in parentheses):

- Cheryomushsky (Cheryomushsky)
- Kharitonovsky (Kharitonovo)
- Koryazhemsky (Koryazhma)
- Pacheozersky (Vystavka)
- Peschansky (Grigorovo)
- Revazhsky (Medvedka)
- Savvatievsky (Savvatiya)
- Solvychegodsky (Solvychegodsk)
- Udimovsky (Udimsky)
- Udimsky (Kuimikha)
- Votlazhemsky (Vystavka)
- Zabelinsky (Fedotovskaya)

=== Municipal divisions ===
As a municipal division, the district is incorporated as Kotlassky Municipal District. The town of oblast significance of Kotlas is incorporated separately from the district as Kotlas Urban Okrug. The municipal district is divided into three urban settlements and one rural settlement (the administrative centers are given in parentheses):

- Privodinskoye Urban Settlement (Privodino)
- Solvychegodskoye Urban Settlement (Solvychegodsk)
- Shipitsynskoye Urban Settlement (Shipitsyno)
- Cheryomushskoye Rural Settlement (Kotlas)

== Economy ==
=== Industry ===
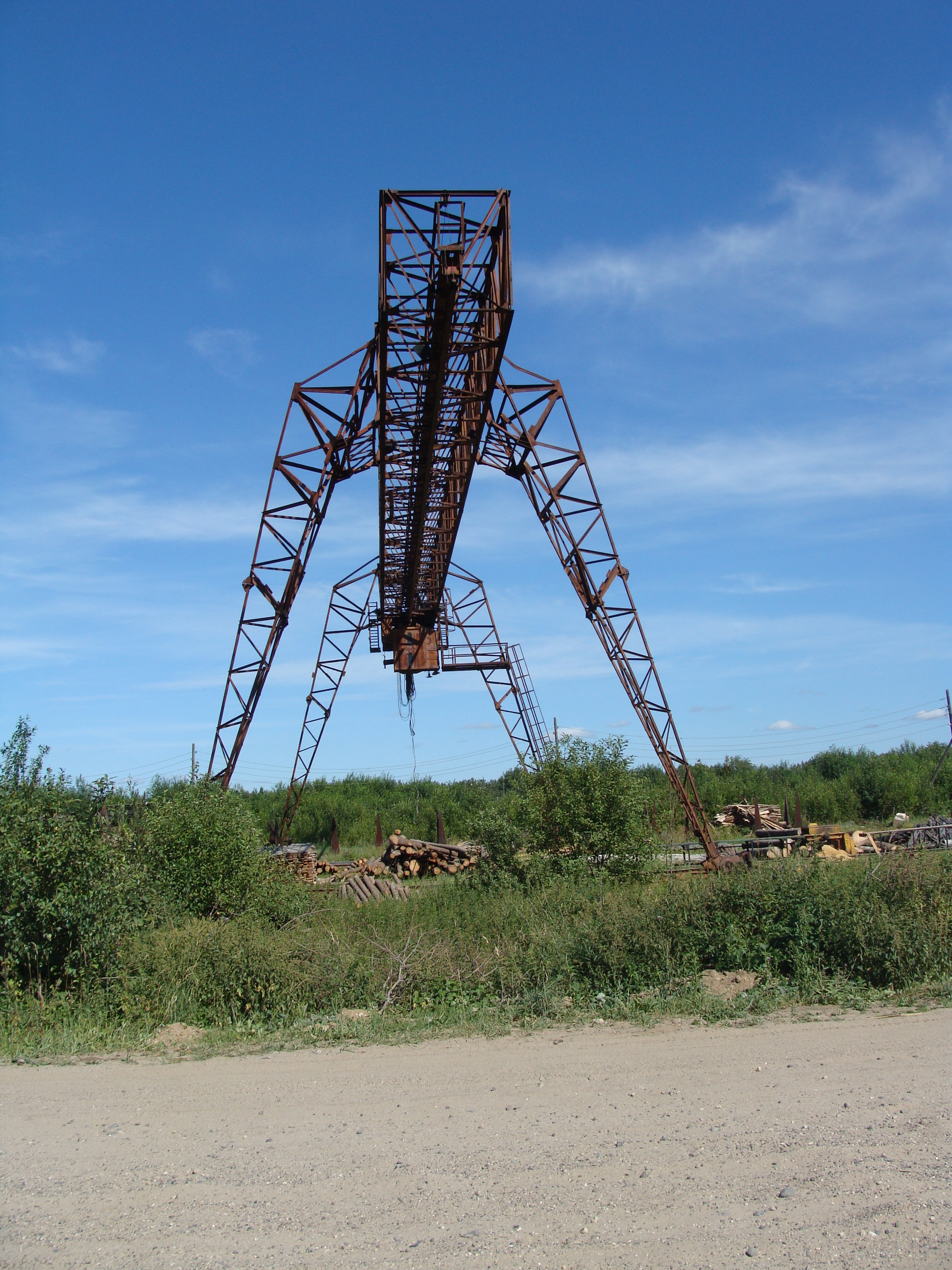
A timber works in Cheryomushsky

In 2010, timber industry accounted for 90.3% of the total industrial output of the district.

=== Agriculture ===
In 2010, there were ninety-six farms in the district, producing meat (beef and pork), milk, cereals, and potatoes.

=== Transportation ===
Kotlas is an important railway hub, where the railway to Kirov branches off southeast from the main railway, connecting Konosha and Vorkuta (in the Komi Republic).

The Northern Dvina and the Vychegda Rivers are navigable; there is regular passenger navigation on the Vychegda.

Roads connect Kotlas with Veliky Ustyug (and eventually Vologda and Kostroma) to the south, Syktyvkar to the east, and Krasnoborsk (eventually Arkhangelsk) to the north. There are also local roads. There is regular passenger bus traffic originating from Kotlas.

Privodino has an oil-pumping station in the Baltic Pipeline System.

== Culture and recreation ==
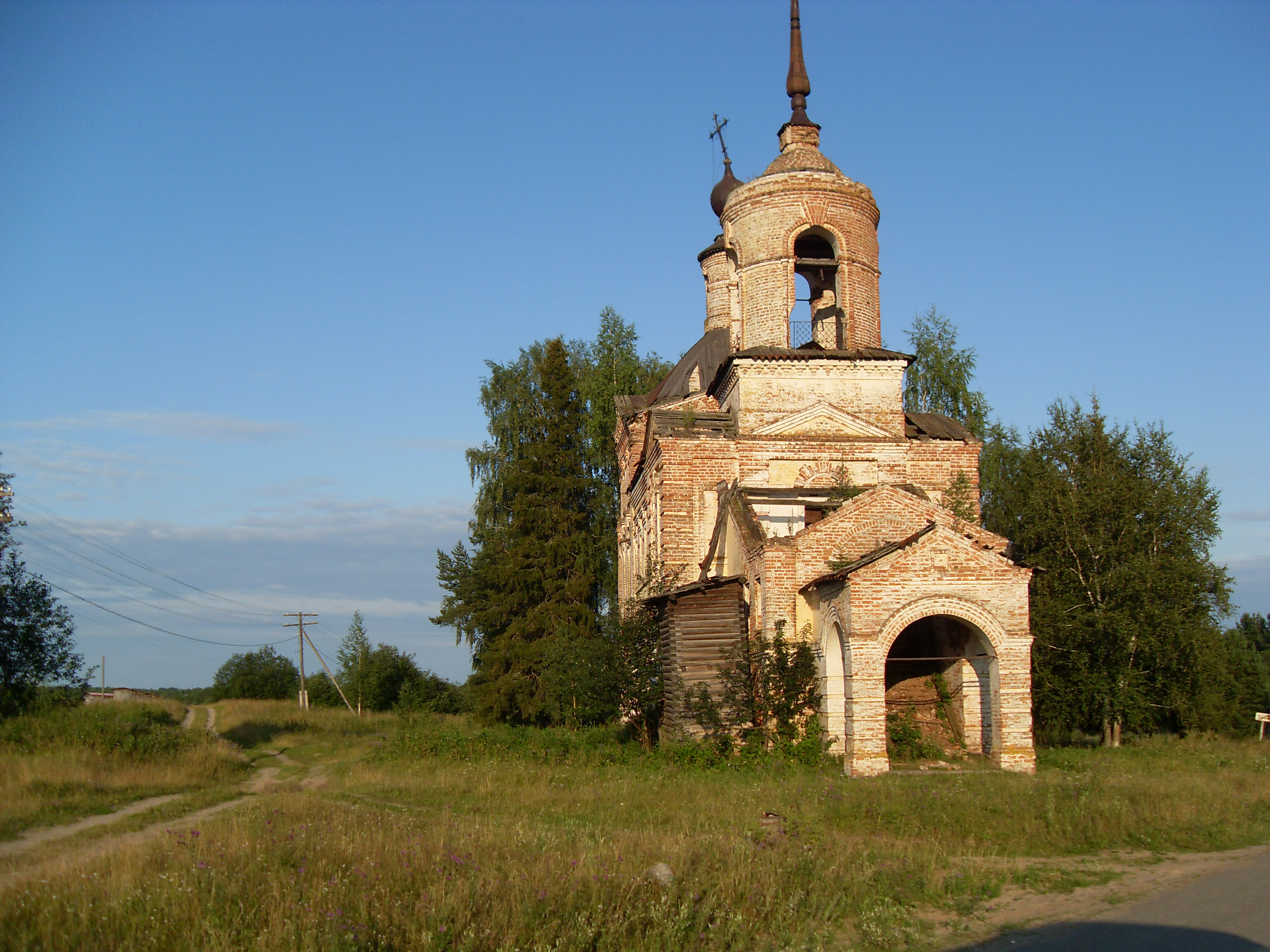
St. Nicholas Church in Nyuba, built between 1818 and 1821. Architectural monument protected at the local level.

The district contains nine objects of cultural heritage protected at the federal level (all of them in Solvychegodsk), and additionally fifty-two monuments of history and architecture of local importance (thirty-three of them in Solvychegodsk). Most of these are brickstone churches built prior to 1917. The federal list of cultural heritage includes the following Solvychegodsk ensembles:

- former Presentation Monastery, including the Presentation Church (1688—1712), one of the five surviving Stroganov baroque churches
- former Annunciation Cathedral (1560—1584) with the adjacent bell-tower
- Church of the Holy Mandylion (Spaso-Obydenskaya Church, 1691—1697)
- Pyankov House (19th century)

The biggest museum in the district, Solvychegodsk Museum of Art and History, is housed in the former Annunciation Cathedral in Solvychegodsk. There is also a small private museum devoted to the fictional author Kozma Prutkov, who, according to the official biography, was born in Solvychegodsk. In the village of Medvedki there is the museum devoted to the Soviet naval officer Nikolay Kuznetsov, who was born in Medvedki and eventually reached the ranks of the Commander-in-Chief of the Naval Forces.

== Sport ==
It has a youth bandy team called Salyut-Vychegda.
