= Kotlas =

Town in Arkhangelsk Oblast, Russia

Kotlas Котлас
- Town
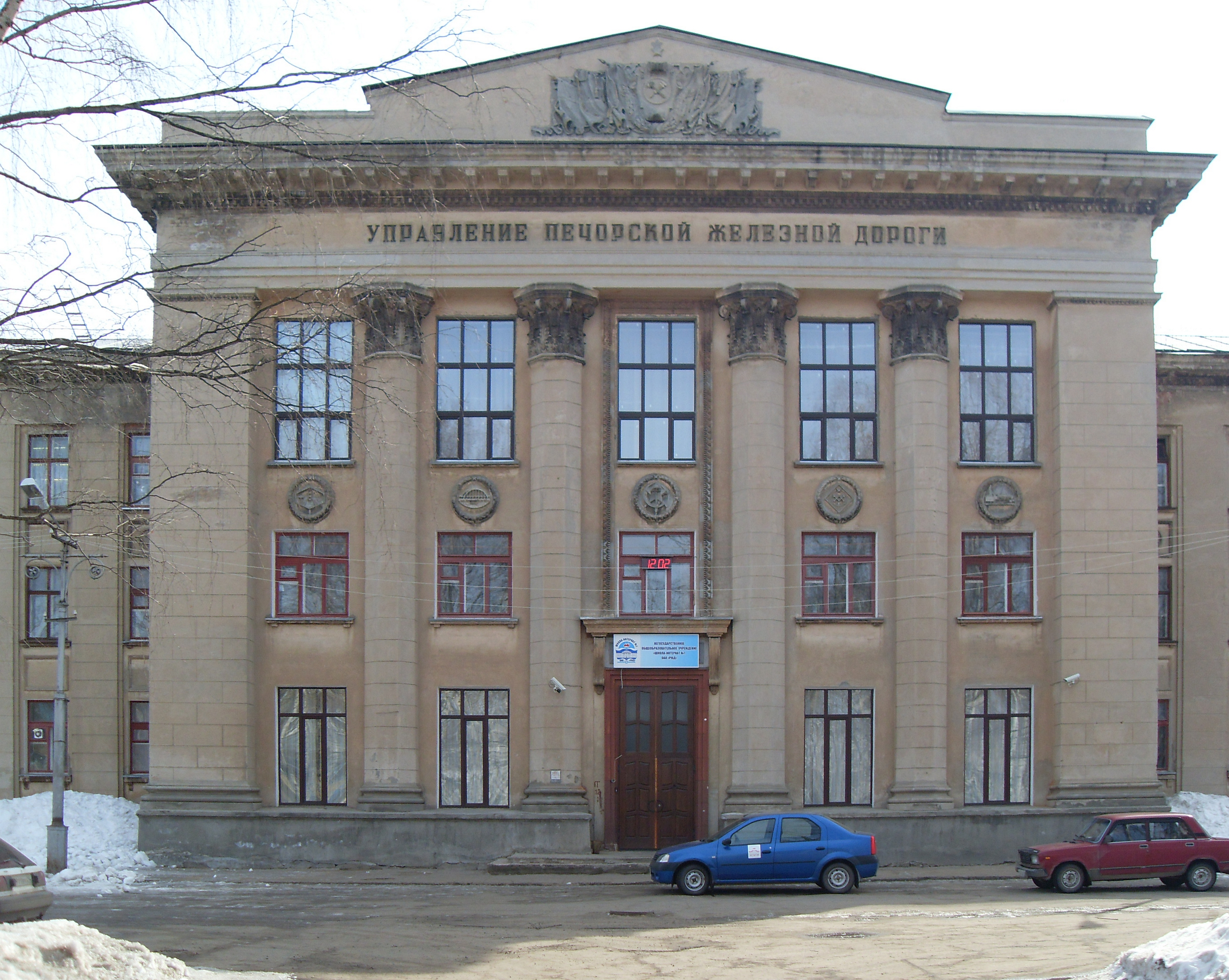
- Former headquarters of the Pechora Railway in Kotlas

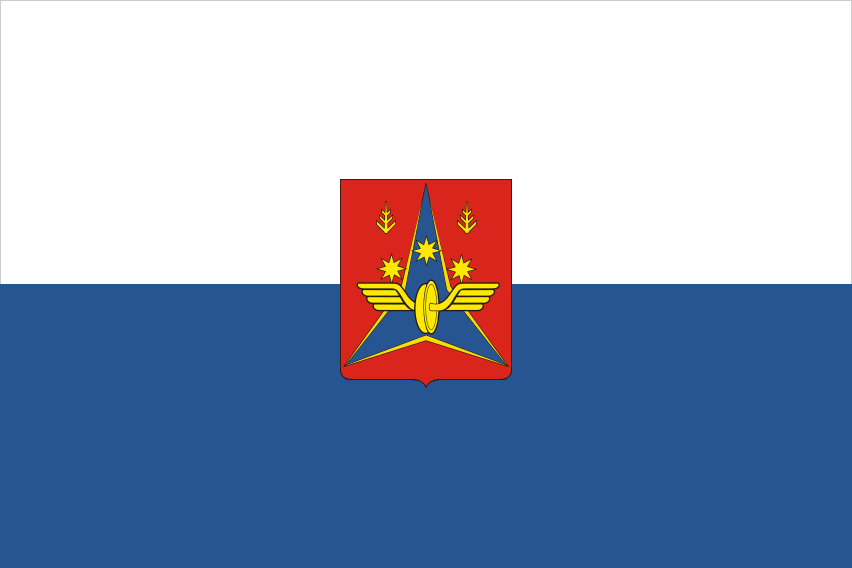
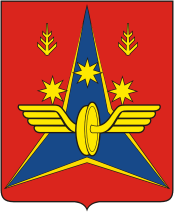
- Flag Coat of arms
- Interactive map of Kotlas
- Location of Kotlas Kotlas (European Russia) Kotlas (Russia)
- Coordinates: 61°15′N 46°38′E
- Country: Russia
- Federal subject: Arkhangelsk Oblast
- Founded: 1890
- Town status since: June 16, 1917

Area
  - Total: 68.039 km^{2} (26.270 sq mi)
- Elevation: 80 m (260 ft)

Population (2010 Census)
  - Total: 60,562
  - Estimate (2025): 55,614 (−8.2%)
  - Rank: 271st in 2010
  - Density: 890.11/km^{2} (2,305.4/sq mi)

Administrative status
  - Subordinated to: town of oblast significance of Kotlas
  - Capital of: town of oblast significance of Kotlas, Kotlassky District

Municipal status
  - Urban okrug: Kotlas Urban Okrug
  - Capital of: Kotlas Urban Okrug, Kotlassky Municipal District, Cheryomushskoye Rural Settlement
- Time zone: UTC+3 (MSK)
- Postal codes: 165300–165306, 165308, 165309, 165311–165313, 165398, 165399
- Dialing code: +7 81837
- OKTMO ID: 11710000001
- Website: www.kotlas-city.ru

Kotlas (Russian: Ко́тлас) is a town in Arkhangelsk Oblast, Russia, located at the confluence of the Northern Dvina and Vychegda Rivers. Population: 60,562 (2010 census); 60,647 (2002 census); 68,021 (1989 Soviet census).

Kotlas is the third-largest town of Arkhangelsk Oblast in terms of population (after Arkhangelsk and Severodvinsk) and an important transport hub.

== History ==
The place was probably inhabited from ancient times, but was only granted official town status by the Provisional Government of Russia on June 16, 1917, when it was a part of Vologda Governorate. In 1918, the area was transferred to the newly formed Northern Dvina Governorate, and in 1924 the uyezds were abolished in favor of the new divisions, the districts (raions). Kotlassky District was established on June 25, 1924. In 1929, Northern Dvina Governorate was merged into Northern Krai, which in 1936 was transformed into Northern Oblast. In 1937, Northern Oblast was split into Arkhangelsk Oblast and Vologda Oblast. Kotlassky District remained in Arkhangelsk Oblast ever since.

=== Gulag ===
During the 1930s, Kotlas became a place to which kulaks were deported and made to work in the forestry industry. It was managed by the Kotlaslag division of Gulag. Later, it hosted all possible categories of people repressed during the Stalin era. A significant population of Poles existed in the area, with whole Polish villages resettled here in 1920s and 1930s.

Labor camps existed within the territory of the city until 1953. Besides logging and the paper industry, inmates worked at plant, housing, bridge, and railroad construction. Most of camps were unguarded barrack settlements. In addition, Kotlas was a major transit point for deportees transferred further to the north and east, since it was a railroad terminus. There is a Kotlas branch of the Sovest (Conscience) organization, which seeks to preserve the memory of those times and seek compensation for victims.

In 1998 the city authorities turned the Makarikha cemetery where prisoners and deportees were buried into a memorial complex.

=== Pechora railway ===
The further development of Kotlas was due to the construction of the Pechora Railway. Already from 1899 Kotlas was connected by a railway line with Vyatka (currently Kirov), which was heavily used for the cargo transport of goods to and from the Northern Dvina. In 1940, the construction of the railroad connecting Konosha (on the railway stretch between Moscow and Arkhangelsk) to Vorkuta started. The railroad was needed to transport coal, timber, and later oil from the Komi Republic. The headquarters of this railroad were opened in Kotlas. In the same year, Kotlas became a separate administrative unit. In December 1941, the road was completed, and from 1942, the regular service started. Kotlas thus became an important transport hub. The headquarters of the Pechora Railway were located in Kotlas until 1959, when the railway was merged into the Northern Railway.

== Administrative and municipal status ==
Within the framework of administrative divisions, Kotlas serves as the administrative center of Kotlassky District, even though it is not a part of it. As an administrative division, it is, together with one work settlement (Vychegodsky) and two rural localities, incorporated separately as the town of oblast significance of Kotlas—an administrative unit with the status equal to that of the districts. As a municipal division, the town of oblast significance of Kotlas is incorporated as Kotlas Urban Okrug.

Within the framework of municipal divisions, Kotlas also serves as the administrative center of Cheryomushskoye Rural Settlement, even though it is not a part of it.

== Economy ==
Kotlas is a center of timber industry and an important river port and a railroad center (situated on the railroad connecting central Russia with the Komi Republic).

The Northern Dvina and the Vychegda Rivers are navigable; there is regular passenger navigation on the Vychegda. Roads connect Kotlas with Veliky Ustyug (and eventually Vologda and Kostroma) to the South, Syktyvkar to the East, and Krasnoborsk (eventually Arkhangelsk) to the North. There is regular passenger bus traffic originating in Kotlas.

Kotlas is an important railway hub, where the railway to Kirov branches off south-east from the main railway, connecting Konosha and Vorkuta.

Kotlas is served by the Kotlas Airport and is home to the Savatiya air base.

== Culture and recreation ==
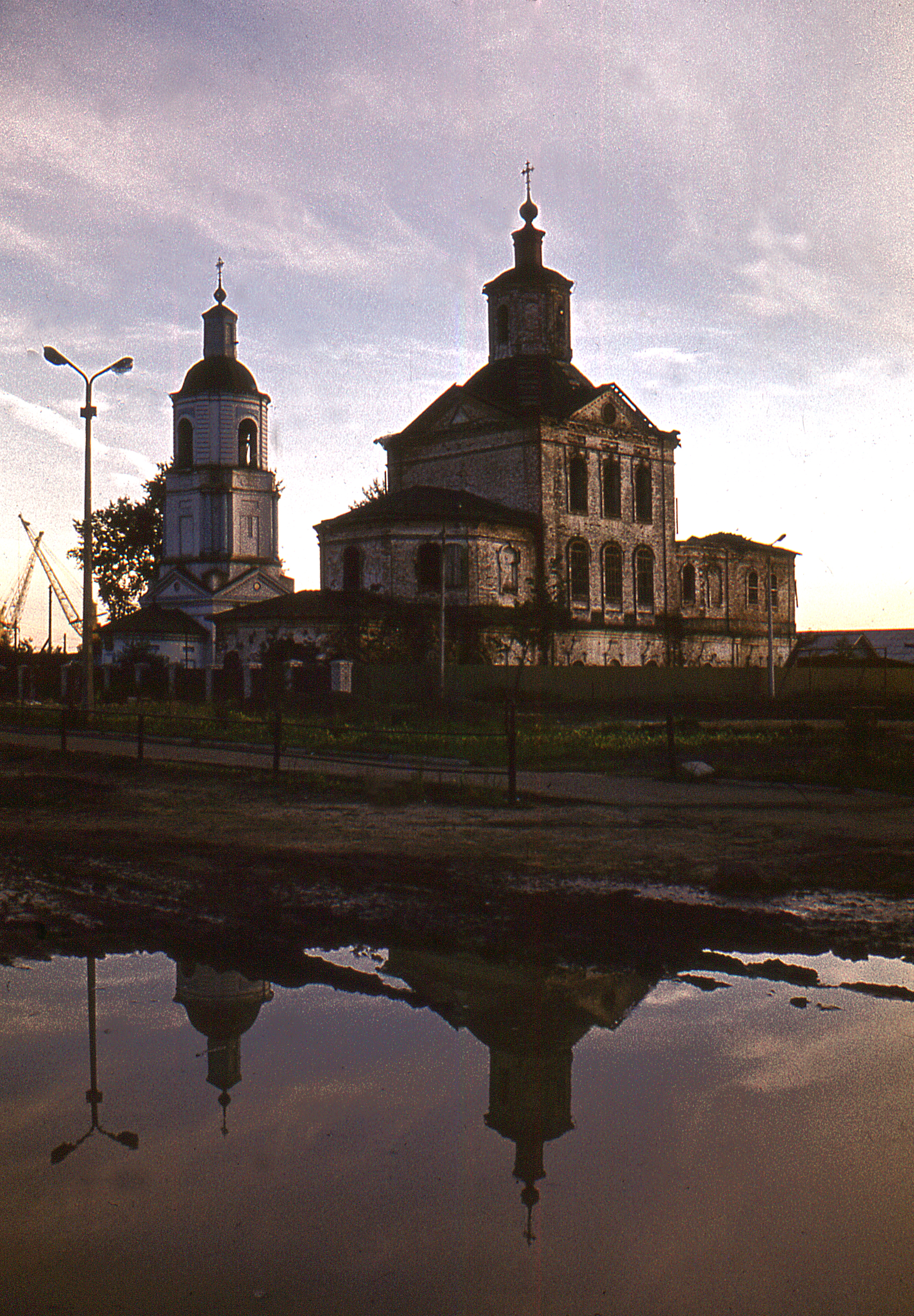
The Church of St. Stephan of Perm

The Church of St. Stephan of Perm was built in 1788, and the adjacent bell-tower was built in 1825. Both are protected at the local level as architectural monuments, as is Narodny Dom, a wooden house built at the beginning of 20th century.

== Geography ==
=== Climate ===
Kotlas has a subarctic climate (Köppen climate classification Dfc), bordering closely on a humid continental climate, featuring long, very cold winters, and short, warm summers.

Climate data for Kotlas
Month	Jan	Feb	Mar	Apr	May	Jun	Jul	Aug	Sep	Oct	Nov	Dec	Year
Record high °C (°F)	5.5 (41.9)	5.2 (41.4)	15.2 (59.4)	26.9 (80.4)	33.0 (91.4)	33.9 (93.0)	35.5 (95.9)	35.2 (95.4)	28.7 (83.7)	21.6 (70.9)	12.4 (54.3)	5.5 (41.9)	35.5 (95.9)
Mean daily maximum °C (°F)	−9.0 (15.8)	−7.1 (19.2)	−0.1 (31.8)	8.0 (46.4)	16.3 (61.3)	20.9 (69.6)	23.6 (74.5)	19.9 (67.8)	13.7 (56.7)	5.4 (41.7)	−2.4 (27.7)	−6.6 (20.1)	6.9 (44.4)
Daily mean °C (°F)	−12.2 (10.0)	−10.9 (12.4)	−4.6 (23.7)	2.7 (36.9)	9.9 (49.8)	14.8 (58.6)	17.7 (63.9)	14.4 (57.9)	9.2 (48.6)	2.7 (36.9)	−4.7 (23.5)	−9.3 (15.3)	2.5 (36.5)
Mean daily minimum °C (°F)	−15.8 (3.6)	−14.6 (5.7)	−9.0 (15.8)	−2.0 (28.4)	4.1 (39.4)	9.0 (48.2)	11.9 (53.4)	9.7 (49.5)	5.5 (41.9)	0.3 (32.5)	−7.1 (19.2)	−12.4 (9.7)	−1.7 (28.9)
Record low °C (°F)	−47.1 (−52.8)	−44.9 (−48.8)	−36.0 (−32.8)	−27.2 (−17.0)	−12.8 (9.0)	−3.0 (26.6)	−0.8 (30.6)	−3.6 (25.5)	−7.1 (19.2)	−22.5 (−8.5)	−40.0 (−40.0)	−44.9 (−48.8)	−47.1 (−52.8)
Average precipitation mm (inches)	39 (1.5)	32 (1.3)	31 (1.2)	33 (1.3)	49 (1.9)	71 (2.8)	78 (3.1)	62 (2.4)	55 (2.2)	60 (2.4)	50 (2.0)	42 (1.7)	602 (23.8)
Average precipitation days (≥ 1.0 mm)	12	10	9	7	9	10	10	11	10	12	12	13	125
Average relative humidity (%)	85	83	78	70	67	71	75	81	85	86	88	87	80
Source 1: www.pogodaiklimat.ru
Source 2: NOAA

== Sports ==
Salyut is the local bandy club. Alexandr Tyukavin, a notable player voted as third best player of the Russian National Championship 2011–2012, was born in Kotlas. In 2014 he was awarded a prize from the International Fair Play Committee.

== Twin towns – sister cities ==
Kotlas is twinned with:

- Tarnów, Lesser Poland Voivodeship, Poland
- Waterville, Maine, United States
