= Northern Oblast (1936–1937) =

1936–1937 unit of Russia

Coordinates: 64°32′N 40°32′E

Northern Oblast Северная область
- Oblast of the Russian SFSR
- 1936–1937
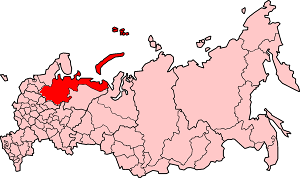
- Location in the Russian SFSR
- Capital: Arkhangelsk
- Population
  - 1937: 2,262,255
- History
  - Established: 5 December 1936
  - Disestablished: 23 September 1937
- Political subdivisions: 53 districts and a national okrug subdivided into three districts.
Preceded by	Succeeded by
Northern Krai	Arkhangelsk Oblast; Vologda Oblast

Northern Oblast (Russian: Северная область, romanized: Severnaya oblast) was an administrative-territorial unit (oblast) of the Russian SFSR from 1936 to 1937. Its seat was in the city of Arkhangelsk. The oblast was located in the north of European Russia and its territory is currently divided between Arkhangelsk, Vologda, Kostroma and Kirov oblasts and the Nenets Autonomous Okrug.

Before 1936, the area occupied by Northern Oblast was part of Northern Krai, a vast administrative unit comprising the north of Russia. The 1936 Soviet Constitution abolished Northern Krai and divided its territory between the Komi Republic and the new Northern Oblast. Northern Oblast included 54 districts, three of which were in the Nenets Autonomous Okrug. In 1937, the Oblast was split into Arkhangelsk and Vologda Oblasts. In 1941, three of its districts – Lalsky, Oparinsky and Podosinovsky – were transferred from Arkhangelsk Oblast to Kirov Oblast. Pavinsky and Vokhomsky District became a part of Kostroma Oblast.

By the 1937 All-Union Census, the population of Northern Oblast was 2,262,255 persons.

== Districts ==
The following districts were established in Northern Oblast (their administrative centers are given in parentheses):

- Bereznikovsky District (Bereznik);
- Biryakovsky District (Biryakovskoye);
- Cherevkovsky District (Cherevkovo);
- Chyobsarsky District (Chyobsara);
- Gryazovetsky District (Gryazovets);
- Kargopolsky District (Kargopol);
- Karpogorsky District (Karpogory);
- Kharovsky District (Kharovsk);
- Kholmogorsky District (Kholmogory);
- Kichmengsko-Gorodetsky District (Kichmengsky Gorodok);
- Konoshsky District (Konosha);
- Kotlassky District (Kotlas);
- Krasnoborsky District (Krasnoborsk);
- Kubeno-Ozersky District (Kubenskoye);
- Lalsky District (Lalsk);
- Ledengsky District (Ledengskoye);
- Lensky District (Yarensk);
- Leshukonsky District (Leshukonskoye);
- Lezhsky District (Sidorovo);
- Mezensky (Mezen);
- Mezhdurechensky District (Shuyskoye);
- Nikolsky District (Nikolsk);
- Nyuksensky District (Nyuksenitsa);
- Nyandomsky District (Nyandoma);
- Onezhsky District (Onega);
- Oparinsky District (Oparino);
- Pavinsky District (Pavino);
- Pinezhsky District (Pinega);
- Plesetsky District (Plesetsk);
- Podosinovsky District (Podosinovets);
- Primorsky District (Arkhangelsk);
- Priozyorny District (Konyovo);
- Rovdinsky District (Rovdino);
- Roslyatinsky District (Roslyatino);
- Shenkursky District (Shenkursk);
- Sokolsky District (Sokol);
- Syamzhensky District (Yarygino);
- Tarnogsky District (Tarnogsky Gorodok);
- Totemsky District (Totma);
- Ust-Alekseevsky District (Ust-Alekseevo);
- Ust-Kubinsky District (Ustye);
- Ustyansky District (Shangaly);
- Velikoustyugsky District (Veliky Ustyug);
- Velsky (Velsk);
- Verkhnetoyemsky District (Verkhnyaya Toyma);
- Verkhovazhsky District (Verkhovazhye);
- Vilegodsky District (Ilyinsko-Podomskoye);
- Vokhomsky District (Vokhma);
- Vozhegodsky District (Vozhega);
- Yemetsky District (Yemetsk).

Three districts belonged to the Nenets National Okrug:

- Bolshezemelsky District (Khoseda-Khard);
- Kanino-Timansky District (Nizhnyaya Pyosha);
- Nizhne-Pechorsky District (Oksino).
