= Northern Krai =

Administrative unit of Russia (1929–1936)

Coordinates: 64°32′N 40°32′E

Northern Krai Северный край
- Krai of the Russian SFSR
- 1929–1936
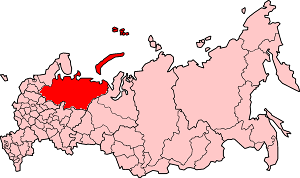
- Capital: Arkhangelsk
- History
  - Established: 14 January 1929
  - Disestablished: 5 December 1936
- Political subdivisions: 5 okrugs 1 autonomous oblast
Preceded by
Arkhangelsk Governorate
Vologda Governorate
Northern Dvina Governorate
Succeeded by
Northern Oblast
Komi ASSR

Northern Krai (Russian: Северный край, romanized: Severny Krai) was an administrative-territorial unit (krai) of the Russian SFSR from 1929 to 1936. Its seat was in the city of Arkhangelsk. The krai was located in the north of European Russia, and its territory is currently divided between Arkhangelsk, Vologda, Kostroma, and Kirov Oblasts, the Nenets Autonomous Okrug, and the Komi Republic.

== History ==
The krai was established on January 14, 1929 by the All-Russian Central Executive Committee. The territory of the krai was formed from three governorates (Arkhangelsk, Vologda, and Northern Dvina) and the Komi-Zyryan Autonomous Oblast.

On July 15, 1929 the All-Russian Central Executive Committee issued a decree splitting Northern Krai (with the exception of the Komi-Zyryan Autonomous Oblast, which remain as a single unit with the seat in Ust-Sysolsk, and the islands of Vaygach, Kolguev, Matveyev, Novaya Zemlya, Solovetsky Islands, and Franz Josef Land) into five administrative districts (okrugs)

- Arkhangelsk Okrug (with the seat located in Arkhangelsk;
- Nenets Okrug (with the borders and the seat to be defined);
- Northern Dvina Okrug (Veliky Ustyug);
- Nyandoma Okrug (Nyandoma);
- Vologda Okrug (Vologda).

Before the krai was established, the division of its constituent governorates mixed the old division inherited from the Russian Empire (uyezds) with the new one (districts, or raions). The same decree established the division of the krai into districts. All okrugs and the Komi-Zyryan Autonomous Oblast were divided into districts, and the Arctic ocean islands remained subordinate to the Krai executive committee.

The following districts were established,

- In Arkhangelsk Okrug: Arkhangelsky (with the administrative center in Arkhangelsk), Bereznikovsky (Bereznik), Chekuyevsky (Chekuyevo), Karpogorsky (Karpogory), Kholmogorsky (Kholmogory), Leshukonsky (Leshukonskoye), Mezensky (Mezen), Onezhsky (Onega), Pinezhsky (Pinega), Plesetsky (the settlement at the Plesetskaya railway station), Primorsky (Arkhangelsk), and Yemetsky (Yemetsk).
- In Nenets Okrug: Kanino-Timansky (Nizhnyaya Pesha), Nenetsky (Khoseda-Khord).
- In Northern Dvina Okrug: Cherevkovsky (Cherevkovo), Kichmengsko-Gorodetsky (Kichmengsky Gorodok), Kotlassky (Kotlas), Krasnoborsky (Krasnoborsk), Lalsky (Lalsk), Lensky (Yarensk), Nikolsky (Nikolsk), Oparinsky (settlement at the Oparino railway station), Podosinovsky (Podosinovets), Roslyatinsky (Roslyatino), Sukhonsky (Gorodishchenskoye), Velikoustyugsky (Veliky Ustyug), Verkhnetoyemsky (Verkhnyaya Toyma), Vilegodsky (Ilyinsko-Podomskoye), Vokhomsky (Vokhma).
- In Nyandoma Okrug: Kargopolsky (Kargopol), Konoshsky (settlement at the Konosha railway station), Nyandomsky (Nyandoma), Priozyorny (Konyovo), Rovdinsky (Rovdino), Shenkursky (Shenkursk), Ustyansky (Shangaly), Velsky (Velsk), Verkhovazhsky (Verkhovazhye).
- In Vologda Okrug: Chyobsarsky (settlement at the Chyobsara railway station), Gryazovetsky (Gryazovets), Kharovsky (settlement at the Kharovskaya railway station), Kokshengsky (Tarnogsky Gorodok), Kubeno-Ozyorsky (Kubenskoye), Ledengsky (Ledengskoye), Shuysky (Svyatogorye), Sverdlovsky (Sokol), Syamzhensky (Yarygino), Tolshmensky (Ust-Tolshma), Totemsky (Totma), Ust-Kubensky (Ustye), Vologodsky (Vologda), Vozhegodsky (settlement at the Vozhega railway station).
- In the Komi-Zyryan Autonomous Oblast: Izhmo-Pechorsky (Izhma), Priluzsky (Obyachevo), Storozhevsky (Storozhevsk), Sysolsky (Vizinga), Udorsky (Koslanskoe), Ust-Kulomsky (Ust-Kulom), Ust-Sysolsky (Ust-Sysolsk), Ust-Tsylemsky (Ust-Tsylma), Ust-Vymsky (Ustvymskoye).

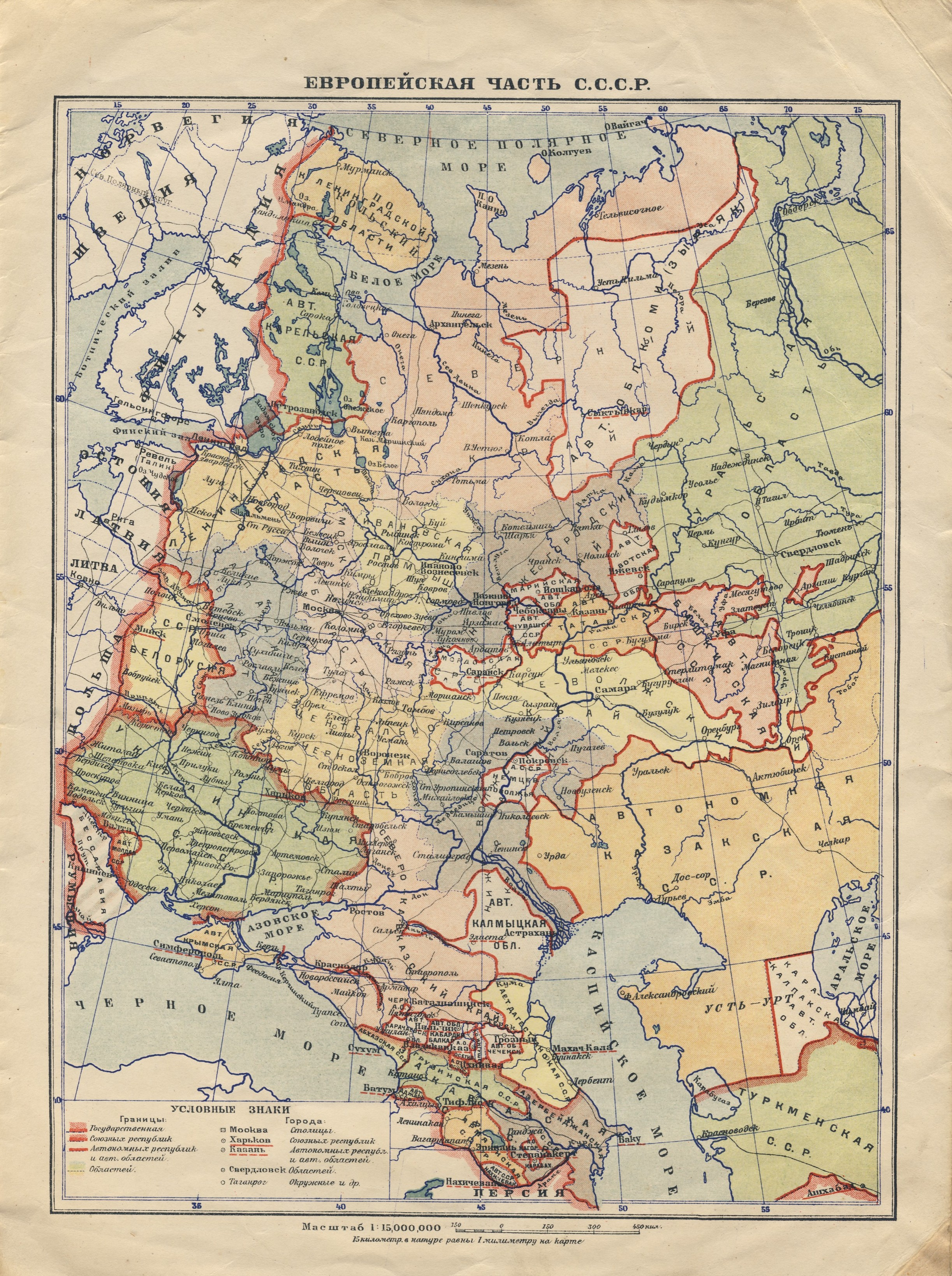
Northern Krai on a 1930 map of European USSR

In July 1930, the Okrugs were abolished. The Nenets Okrug became an autonomous unit, the Komi-Zyryan Autonomous Oblast remained intact, and the districts which were part of the four other Okrugs became directly subordinate to the krai government. By August 25, 1930, the krai consisted of

- Cities of Arkhangelsk and Vologda;
- Nenets National District (consisting of Bolshezemelsky, Kanino-Timansky, and Pustozersky districts);
- Komi-Zyryan Autonomous Oblast (Izhemsky, Priluzsky, Storozhevsky, Syktyvkarsky, Sysolsky, Troitsko-Pechorsky, Udorsky, Ust-Kulomsky, Ust-Usinsky, Ust-Tsylemsky, and Ust-Vymsky districts);
- Fifty districts of central subordination: Bereznikovsky, Chekuyevsky, Cherevkovsky, Chyobsarsky, Gryazovetsky, Kargopolsky, Karpogorsky, Kharovsky, Kholmogorsky, Kichmengsko-Gorodetsky, Kokshengsky, Konoshsky, Kotlassky, Krasnoborsky, Kubeno-Ozersky, Lalsky, Ledengsky, Lensky, Leshukonsky, Mezensky, Nikolsky, Nyuksensky, Nyandomsky, Onezhsky, Oparinsky, Pinezhsky, Plesetsky, Podosinovsky, Primorsky, Priozyorny, Rovdinsky, Roslyatinsky, Shenkursky, Shuysky, Sukhonsky, Sverdlovsky, Syamzhensky, Tolshmensky, Totemsky, Ust-Kubinsky, Ustyansky, Velikoustyuzhsky, Velsky, Verkhnetoyemsky, Verkhovazhsky, Vilegodsky, Vologodsky, Vokhomsky, Vozhegodsky, Yemetsky;
- Islands in the Arctic Ocean and Solovetsky Islands.

Between 1930 and 1935 there were constant changes in the district configuration, some districts were abolished, established, and renamed. On February 10, 1934, Novaya Zemlya, Vaygach, and a number of smaller islands in the Barents and Kara Seas were moved to the Nenets National Okrug. By 1936, the krai included 65 districts.

On March 5, 1936, Pechorsky Okrug which was a part of the Northern Krai was established. The Okrug included three districts, Izhemsky, Ust-Tsilemsky, and Ust-Usinsky, and a part of Troitsko-Pechorsky District. This was related due to the beginning of the coal mining in the north of what is now the Komi Republic.

According to the 1936 Soviet Constitution, Northern Krai was abolished, and its territory was divided between newly established Northern Oblast and Komi Republic. Northern Oblast included 54 districts and was in 1937 split into Arkhangelsk and Vologda Oblasts. Three of the districts of Northern Krai, Lalsky, Oparinsky, and Podosinovsky, as the result of some later administrative changes, ended up in Kirov Oblast. Pavinsky and Vokhomsky District were later transferred into Kostroma Oblast.
