= Oparino =

Oparino (Russian: Опарино) is the name of several inhabited localities in Russia.

== Urban localities ==
- Oparino, Oparinsky District, Kirov Oblast, an urban-type settlement in Oparinsky District of Kirov Oblast

== Rural localities ==
- Oparino, Kemerovo Oblast, a village in Khorosheborskaya Rural Territory of Topkinsky District of Kemerovo Oblast
- Oparino, Urzhumsky District, Kirov Oblast, a village in Lazarevsky Rural Okrug of Urzhumsky District of Kirov Oblast
- Oparino, Moscow Oblast, a village in Shemetovskoye Rural Settlement of Sergiyevo-Posadsky District of Moscow Oblast
- Oparino, Tver Oblast, a village in Kalininsky District of Tver Oblast
- Oparino, Vologda Oblast, a village in Andomsky Selsoviet of Vytegorsky District of Vologda Oblast
- Oparino, Yaroslavl Oblast, a village in Karabikhsky Rural Okrug of Yaroslavsky District of Yaroslavl Oblast
