= Yarygino =

Yarygino (Russian: Ярыгино) is the name of several rural localities (selos and villages) in Russia:

- Yarygino, Kursk Oblast, a selo in Yaryginsky Selsoviet of Pristensky District of Kursk Oblast
- Yarygino, Moscow Oblast, a village in Vasilyevskoye Rural Settlement of Sergiyevo-Posadsky District of Moscow Oblast
- Yarygino, Oryol Oblast, a village in Otradinsky Selsoviet of Mtsensky District of Oryol Oblast
- Yarygino, Perm Krai, a village in Kungursky District of Perm Krai
- Yarygino, Ryazan Oblast, a village in Bulgakovsky Rural Okrug of Kasimovsky District of Ryazan Oblast
- Yarygino, Smolensk Oblast, a village in Subbotnikovskoye Rural Settlement of Sychyovsky District of Smolensk Oblast
- Yarygino, Syamzhensky District, Vologda Oblast, a village in Zhityevsky Selsoviet of Syamzhensky District of Vologda Oblast
- Yarygino, Tarnogsky District, Vologda Oblast, a village in Shebengsky Selsoviet of Tarnogsky District of Vologda Oblast
- Yarygino, Velikoustyugsky District, Vologda Oblast, a village in Pokrovsky Selsoviet of Velikoustyugsky District of Vologda Oblast
- Yarygino, Vologodsky District, Vologda Oblast, a village in Semenkovsky Selsoviet of Vologodsky District of Vologda Oblast
- Yarygino, Yaroslavl Oblast, a village in Lyubimsky Rural Okrug of Lyubimsky District of Yaroslavl Oblast
