= Ivan Babushkin =

Russian Bolshevik revolutionary

- Ива́н Ба́бушкин
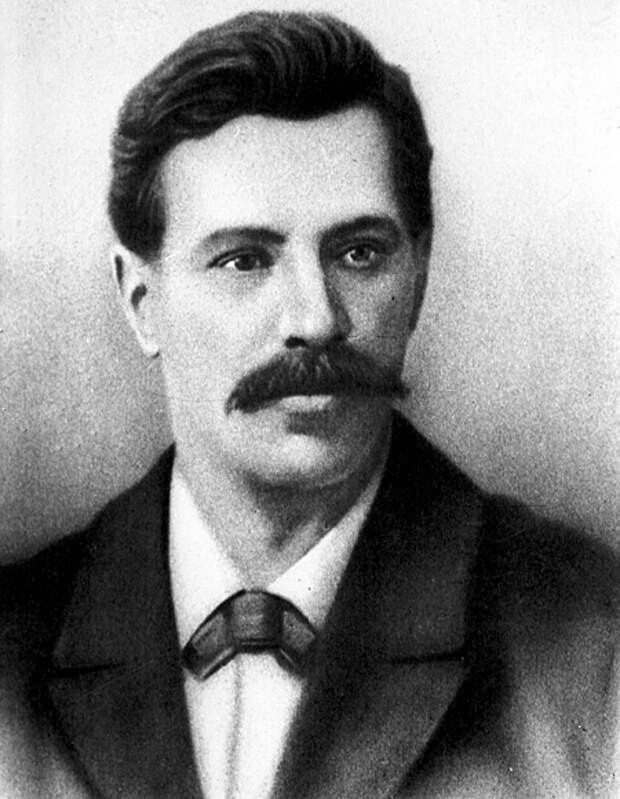
- Born: January 3, 1873; Ledengskoye, Totemsky Uyezd, Vologda Governorate, Russian Empire
- Died: January 18, 1906 (aged 33); Mysovaya station, Russian Empire

Ivan Vasilyevich Babushkin (Russian: Ива́н Васи́льевич Ба́бушкин) (pseudonym Nikolay Nikolaevich) (January 3, 1873 – January 18, 1906) was a Russian professional Bolshevik revolutionary.

== Early years ==
Babushkin was born in the selo of Ledengskoye, Totemsky Uyezd of Vologda Governorate, currently in Babushkinsky District of Vologda Oblast. His family were poor peasants. At the age of 10, he was put to work in a small workshop in St Petersburg. At 14, he was taken on as an apprentice torpedo maker in Kronstadt. Having completed his apprenticeship in 1891, aged 18, he found work at the Semyannikov Factory in St. Petersburg.

== Revolutionary activities ==
While he was working at the Semyannikov factory, Babushkin was shown illegal narodnik literature, and formed an illicit study circle, with two other young workers named V.A.Shelzunov and P.A.Morozov. They learnt that there was a dispute in intellectual circles between the narodniks and the newer Marxist movement. In 1894, they came into contact with a Marxist circle known as the 'stariki', who included Vladimir Lenin and Yuli Martov. In 1895, joined the St. Petersburg's League of Struggle for the Emancipation of the Working Class, making him one of Russia's first active working class Marxists. He wrote a pamphlet entitled What is a Socialist and Political Criminal?, and organized revolutionary activities targeting the workers of the Semiannikov and Aleksandrov factories.

Babushkin tried to keep the Union together after Lenin and others had been arrested, but was himself arrested during the night on 5 January 1896. After several months in prison, he was sentenced to three years exile in Yekaterinoslav. Working in the Bryansk factory, he organised another workers circle, whose members included the future Chairman of the All-Ukrainian Central Executive Committee, Grigory Petrovsky.

Less than ten months later he was one of the organizers of the Yekaterinoslav League of Struggle for the Emancipation of the Working Class. In October of the following year he set up the Yekaterinoslav Committee of the Russian Social Democratic Labour Party (RSDLP). In 1900, Babushkin established an illegal newspaper, Yuzhnyi Rabochii. Babushkin was a key agent and correspondent for Lenin's Iskra. Constantly on the move to avoid arrest, he organised the distribution of Iskra in Moscow, Smolensk, Polotsk, Orekhovo-Zuevo, Ivanovo-Voznesensk, and other cities.

Arrested again in December 1901, Babushkin he escaped from the Yekaterinoslav prison on 29 July 1902, aided by schoolboys who dyed his hair - which almost proved to be a disaster when the dye turned crimson. He travelled via Germany to London, to join Lenin, but was annoyed by the untidiness of the intellectuals with whom he shared accommodation, so returned to Russia in October 1902 to act as an agent for the newspaper Iskra, which Lenin co-edited.

Babushkin was arrested in St Petersburg in January 1903, and late that year was deported to Verkhoyansk, near the Arctic Circle. Freed under amnesty during the revolution of 1905, he moved to Irkutsk where he was co-opted on the local RSDLP committee, and then to Chita, returning to Irkutsk to rebuild the party organisation after the police had arrested the entire membership of the Irkutsk party committee.

== Death ==
In January 1906, he and five others were attempting to smuggle weapons when a death squad caught up with them and shot them all at the Mysovaya station of the Trans-Siberian Railway.

== Posthumous status ==
The town of Mysovsk near where Babushkin was executed was renamed after him in 1941.

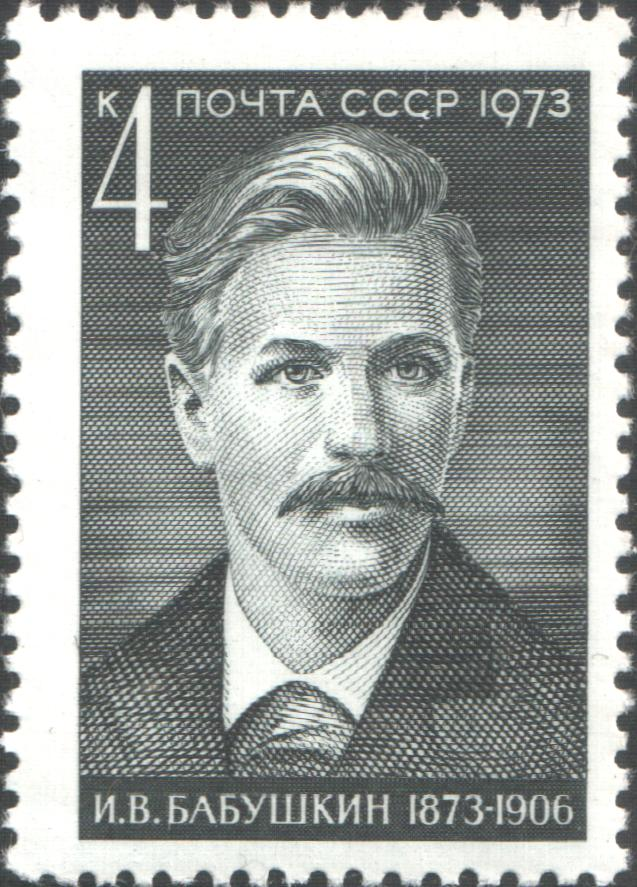
Ivan Babushkin on a 1973 commemorative stamp of the Soviet Union

In 1910, Lenin mentioned that Babushkin, like others, "was a national hero who whole-heartedly devoted themselves to the struggle for the emancipation of the working class". In 1941, Ledengsky District of Vologda Oblast and the selo of Ledengskoye have been renamed into Babushkinsky District and the selo of Imeni Babushkina, respectively. There are also streets in many Russian cities (including Moscow, Ivana Babushkina Street), named after Babushkin.

Babushkinskyi District in Dnipropetrovsk (formerly Yekaterinoslav, now Dnipro) was renamed to Shevchenkivskyi District in November 2015 as part of Ukraine's decommunization campaign.
