= Nizhne-Pechorsky District =

Nizhne-Pechorsky District was a former district (raion) of the Nenets National Okrug in the RSFSR of the former Soviet Union. The district existed from 1929 to 1955.

== Location ==
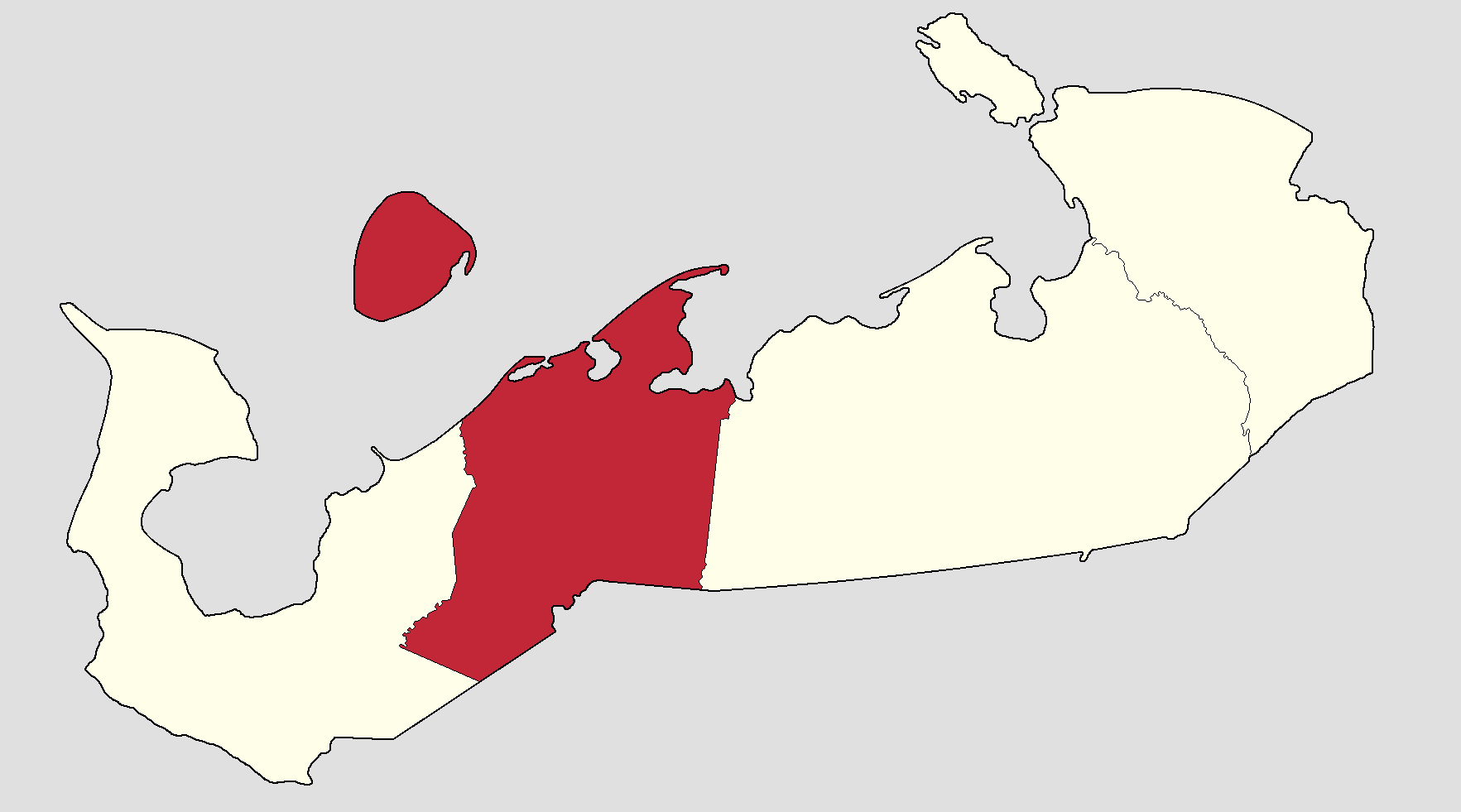
Nizhne-Pechorsky district, Nenets Autonomous Okrug (1929-55)

Nizhne-Pechorsky District was located in the center-west of the Nenets National Okrug. It shared borders with the Kanino-Timansky District in the west and the Bolshezemelsky District in the east, and the Komi Republic in the south. The district also included Kolguyev Island.

== History ==
On 20 December 1929, from the area of the Pechora County, a part of the Arkhangelsk Governorate, Nizhne-Pechorsky District was formed, under the name of "Pustozyorsky District". The administrative center of the district was in the settlement of Velikovisochnoye.

As of 1 January 1931, the territory of Pustozyorsky District was 17,100km^{2}, and the district had a population of around 5,000 people. There were 48 settlements in the district, included in 3 selsoviets.

On 2 March 1932, the administrative center of the district was transferred from Velikovisochnoye to the village of Oksino, while keeping the former name of this district. Later in the year, the district was renamed to Nizhne-Pechorsky District.

As of 1 January 1940, the area of the district had decreased to 13,600km^{2}, but the amount of selsoviets had increased to 4:

- Visochny
- Kuysky
- Nizhne-Pechorsky
- Pustozyorsky

In 1955, the Nizhne-Pechorsky District was abolished.
