= Babushkinsky District, Vologda Oblast =

Babushkinsky District Бабушкинский район (Russian)
- District
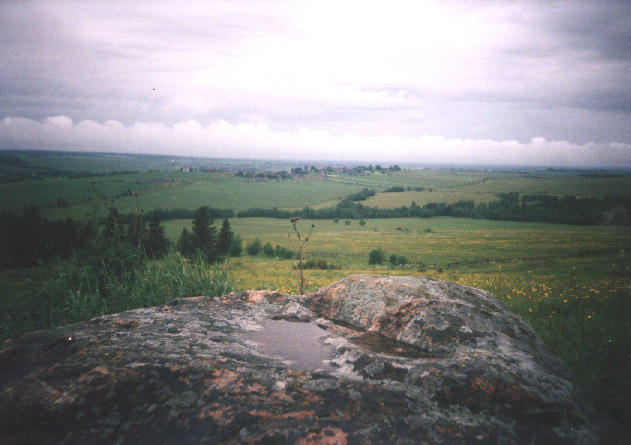
- Mount Isakova near the village of Isakovo in Babushkinsky District

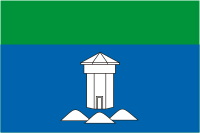
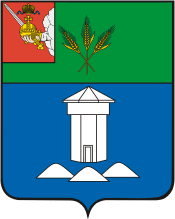
- Flag Coat of arms
- Location of Babushkinsky District in Vologda Oblast
- Coordinates: 59°45′N 43°08′E
- Country: Russia
- Federal subject: Vologda Oblast
- Established: July 15, 1929
- Administrative center: imeni Babushkina

Area
  - Total: 7,761 km^{2} (2,997 sq mi)

Population (2010 Census)
  - Total: 12,779
  - Density: 1.647/km^{2} (4.265/sq mi)
  - Urban: 0%
  - Rural: 100%

Administrative structure
  - Administrative divisions: 15 Selsoviets
  - Inhabited localities: 138 rural localities

Municipal structure
  - Municipally incorporated as: Babushkinsky Municipal District
  - Municipal divisions: 0 urban settlements, 7 rural settlements
- Time zone: UTC+3 (MSK)
- OKTMO ID: 19608000
- Website: http://www.admbabush.ru/

Babushkinsky District (Russian: Ба́бушкинский райо́н) is an administrative and municipal district (raion), one of the twenty-six in Vologda Oblast, Russia. It is located in the southeast of the oblast and borders with Nyuksensky District in the north, Kichmengsko-Gorodetsky District in the northeast, Nikolsky District in the east, Kologrivsky and Chukhlomsky Districts of Kostroma Oblast in the south, and with Totemsky District in the west. The area of the district is 7,761 square kilometers (2,997 sq mi). Its administrative center is the rural locality (a selo) of imeni Babushkina. District's population: 12,779 (2010 census); 14,994 (2002 Census); 18,037 (1989 Soviet census). The population of imeni Babushkina accounts for 31.6% of the district's population.

== Name ==
Prior to 1941, the district was known as Ledengsky District, and the selo of imeni Babushkina was known as Ledengskoye. Both the district and its administrative center were renamed in March 1941 to commemorate Bolshevik revolutionary Ivan Babushkin, who was born in Ledengskoye.

== Geography ==
The district is located at the divide between the basins of the Sukhona, the Yug, and the Unzha Rivers (the left tributary of the Volga), and thus at the divide between the basins of the Arctic Ocean and the Caspian Sea. The landscape is dominated by the Northern Ridge chain of hills. The Unzha crosses the southern part of the district from east to west, and many rivers in the center and the south of the district drain into the Unzha. The rivers in the northeast of the district drain into the Sharzhenga, the left tributary of the Yug. The rivers in the west drain into various right tributaries of the Sukhona, such as the Tolshma, the Ledenga, and the Staraya Totma.

Over 80% of the total area of the district is covered by coniferous forests.

== History ==
The area was populated by Finnic peoples and then colonized by the Novgorod Republic. In the 12th century, Totma and the surrounding areas were already under the control of Novgorod. After the fall of Novgorod, the area became a part of the Grand Duchy of Moscow. In the 14th century, salt was discovered in the valley of the Ledenga, and the selo of Ledengskoye (now called imeni Babushkina) became known for its salt production.

In the course of the administrative reform carried out in 1708 by Peter the Great, the area was included into Archangelgorod Governorate. In 1780, the governorate was abolished, and transformed into Totemsky Uyezd of Vologda Viceroyalty. The latter was abolished in 1796, and the part of it which included Ledengskoye was made into Vologda Governorate.

On July 15, 1929, several governorates, including Vologda Governorate, were merged into Northern Krai, and the uyezds were abolished. Instead, Ledengsky District with the administrative center in the selo of Ledengskoye was established as a part of Vologda Okrug. It included parts of the former area of Totemsky Uyezd. In the following years, the first-level administrative division of Russia kept changing. In 1936, Northern Krai was transformed into Northern Oblast. In 1937, Northern Oblast was split into Arkhangelsk Oblast and Vologda Oblast. Ledengsky District remained in Vologda Oblast ever since, but was renamed Babushkinsky in 1941. During the abortive Khrushchyov administrative reform of the 1960s, Babushkinsky District was briefly disestablished in 1962 and then reestablished in 1965.

In 1918, Northern Dvina Governorate with the administrative center in Veliky Ustyug was established on the areas previously in the northeast of Vologda Governorate. In 1924, the uyezds in Northern Dvina Governorate were abolished and replaced with the districts. On June 10, 1924, Roslyatinsky District was established, among others. The administrative center of Roslyatinsky District was the selo of Roslyatino. In 1929, Northern Dvina Governorate was merged into Northern Krai. On July 30, 1931, Roslyatinsky District was merged into Ledengsky District, then in 1935 it was re-established, and on November 12, 1960 Roslyatinsky District was abolished again, and its area was divided between Babushkinsky and Nikolsky Districts.

== Administrative and municipal divisions ==
Administratively, the district is divided into fifteen selsoviets. Municipally, the district is incorporated as Babushkinsky Municipal District and is divided into seven rural settlements. The municipal district includes all of the inhabited localities of the administrative district, as well as two rural localities (the settlements of Ida and Kordon) from Gryazovetsky District and one rural locality (the settlement of Ilezka) from Nyuksensky District.

== Rural localities in the Babushkinsky District ==
Name	Name in Russian	Population (2002)	Coordinates
Afankovo=	Афаньково	43=	59°45′N 44°13′E
Aksenovo=	Аксёново	20=	59°43′N 43°19′E
Alexeykovo=	Алексейково	67=	59°54′N 43°45′E
Andreyevskoye=	Андреевское	167=	59°45′N 44°11′E
Anikovo=	Аниково	141=	59°23′N 43°44′E
Babya=	Бабья	10=	59°55′N 44°09′E
Belekhovo=	Белехово	56=	59°35′N 43°53′E
Belokrutets=	Белокрутец	26=	59°54′N 44°39′E
Berezovka=	Березовка	325=	59°56′N 43°43′E
Bezgachikha=	Безгачиха	199=	59°52′N 44°31′E
Bolshoy Dvor	Большой Двор	56=	59°54′N 43°22′E
Borisovo=	Борисово	13=	59°27′N 44°07′E
Buchikha=	Бучиха	132=	59°51′N 44°31′E
Budkovo=	Будьково	22=	59°47′N 44°12′E
Chelishchevo=	Челищево	65=	59°44′N 44°13′E
Chupino=	Чупино	40=	59°58′N 43°45′E
Demyanovsky Pogost	Демьяновский Погост	255=	59°54′N 43°25′E
Demyantsevo=	Демьянцево	13=	59°41′N 43°33′E
Dmitriyevo=	Дмитриево	22=	59°27′N 44°07′E
Dor=	Дор	20=	59°54′N 43°35′E
Dorkin Pochinok	Доркин Починок	20=	59°55′N 43°40′E
Dresvyanovo=	Дресвяново	2=	59°44′N 44°10′E
Dudkino=	Дудкино	120=	59°51′N 44°31′E
Dushnevo=	Душнево	64=	59°28′N 43°59′E
Fetinino=	Фетинино	45=	59°23′N 43°46′E
Glebkovo=	Глебково	37=	59°43′N 43°35′E
Gorka (Bereznikovskoye)	Горка	5=	59°22′N 43°57′E
Gorka (Minkovskoye)	Горка	87=	59°42′N 43°34′E
Gorka (Roslyatinskoye)	Горка	1=	59°58′N 44°07′E
Gorodishchevo=	Городищево	75=	59°50′N 44°33′E
Griva=	Грива	10=	59°48′N 44°21′E
Grozino=	Грозино	39=	59°42′N 43°28′E
Ida=	Ида	759=	59°20′N 43°09′E
Imeni Babushkina	Имени Бабушкина	4105=	59°45′N 43°08′E
Isakovo=	Исаково	31=	59°49′N 44°35′E
Kharino=	Харино	62=	59°58′N 43°45′E
Kholm=	Холм	55=	59°53′N 43°39′E
Klimovskaya=	Климовская	11=	59°54′N 43°23′E
Koksharka=	Кокшарка	153=	59°51′N 44°32′E
Komsomolsky=	Комсомольский	140=	59°48′N 43°29′E
Korovenskaya=	Коровенская	5=	59°54′N 43°24′E
Korshunikha=	Коршуниха	24=	59°52′N 44°32′E
Kosikovo=	Косиково	176=	59°52′N 43°24′E
Kozhukhovo=	Кожухово	93=	59°45′N 44°09′E
Kozlets=	Козлец	168=	59°52′N 44°43′E
Krasota=	Красота	186=	59°45′N 44°10′E
Krutets=	Крутец	46=	59°55′N 44°40′E
Kryukovo=	Крюково	56=	59°49′N 44°22′E
Kulibarovo=	Кулибарово	256=	59°43′N 43°36′E
Kunozh=	Кунож	360=	59°16′N 43°45′E
Ledenga=	Леденьга	23=	59°55′N 42°52′E
Legitovo=	Легитово	4=	59°23′N 43°57′E
Levash=	Леваш	19=	59°38′N 43°30′E
Listvenka=	Лиственка	15=	59°47′N 44°15′E
Lnozavod=	Льнозавод	88=	59°41′N 43°28′E
Lodochnaya=	Лодочная	12=	59°54′N 43°27′E
Logduz	Ло́гдуз	300=	60°00′N 44°44′E
Lukerino=	Лукерино	67=	59°43′N 44°13′E
Lyamenga=	Ляменьга	65=	59°51′N 44°32′E
Minkino=	Минькино	4=	59°29′N 44°04′E
Minkovo=	Миньково	998=	59°41′N 43°29′E
Mitino=	Митино	3=	59°49′N 43°17′E
Mulino=	Мулино	13=	59°59′N 43°43′E
Muravyovo=	Муравьево	15=	59°51′N 44°36′E
Nefedovo=	Нефедово	2=	59°48′N 44°32′E
Nikolayevo=	Николаево	35=	59°58′N 44°49′E
Ovsyannikovo=	Овсянниково	111=	59°56′N 43°42′E
Petukhovo=	Петухово	40=	59°30′N 43°34′E
Pleshkino=	Плешкино	110=	59°59′N 44°48′E
Pochinok=	Починок	21=	59°51′N 43°20′E
Podbolotye=	Подболотье	196=	59°52′N 44°34′E
Podgornaya (Babushkinskoye)	Подгорная	10=	59°54′N 43°23′E
Podgornaya (Timanovskoye)	Подгорная	4=	59°59′N 43°44′E
Polyudovo=	Полюдово	87=	59°46′N 44°17′E
Popovo=	Попово	26=	59°47′N 44°17′E
Pozharishche=	Пожарище	40=	59°59′N 43°43′E
Proskurnino=	Проскурнино	11=	59°47′N 43°28′E
Pustosh=	Пустошь	15=	59°21′N 43°39′E
Roslyatino=	Рослятино	836=	59°45′N 44°13′E
Rysenkovo=	Рысенково	6=	59°44′N 44°13′E
Selskaya=	Сельская	31=	59°50′N 44°24′E
Shilovo=	Шилово	15=	59°42′N 43°45′E
Shonorovo=	Шонорово	13=	59°49′N 44°16′E
Skokovo=	Скоково	149=	59°51′N 44°31′E
Skorodumovo=	Скородумово	2=	59°25′N 43°55′E
Sosnovka=	Сосновка	159=	59°52′N 44°30′E
Stari=	Стари	3=	59°53′N 43°28′E
Stepankovo=	Степаньково	56=	59°46′N 44°11′E
Suzdalikha=	Суздалиха	64=	59°52′N 44°31′E
Sumino=	Сумино	22=	59°49′N 44°35′E
Svertnevo=	Свертнево	13=	59°24′N 43°37′E
Talitsa=	Талица	4=	59°39′N 43°44′E
Tarabukino=	Тарабукино	22=	59°53′N 43°26′E
Telyakovo=	Теляково	21=	59°29′N 43°33′E
Terekhovo=	Терехово	4=	59°59′N 44°07′E
Tevigino=	Тевигино	20=	59°32′N 43°35′E
Timanova Gora	Тиманова Гора	196=	59°56′N 43°42′E
Tinovatka=	Тиноватка	102=	59°40′N 43°23′E
Tupanovo=	Тупаново	4=	59°39′N 43°14′E
Varnavino=	Варнавино	12=	59°59′N 43°44′E
Vasilyevo=	Васильево	190=	59°28′N 43°58′E
Veliky Dvor	Великий Двор	235=	59°41′N 43°50′E
Verkhoturye=	Верхотурье	42=	59°48′N 44°33′E
Volgino=	Волгино	2=	59°29′N 44°03′E
Voskresenskoye=	Воскресенское	401=	59°28′N 43°58′E
Vysokaya=	Высокая	4=	59°38′N 44°08′E
Yeremino=	Еремино	87=	59°43′N 43°35′E
Yurkino=	Юркино	166=	59°29′N 43°34′E
Yurmanga=	Юрманга	469=	59°46′N 43°07′E
Zaborye=	Заборье	102=	59°50′N 44°31′E
Zaychiki=	Зайчики	598=	59°35′N 44°07′E
Zelenik=	Зеленик	26=	59°51′N 43°28′E
Zhilkino=	Жилкино	95=	59°55′N 43°41′E
Zhubrino=	Жубрино	231=	59°46′N 44°19′E
Znamya=	Знамя	7=	59°46′N 44°14′E
Zubarikha=	Зубариха	1=	59°26′N 43°37′E

== Economy ==
The economy of the district is based on timber production.

=== Agriculture ===
As of 2009, there were twelve large-scale farms in the district, mostly producing meat and milk, as well as growing crops. The agriculture is steadily shrinking.

=== Transportation ===
A paved road connecting Totma with Nikolsk passes through the district and, in particular, through imeni Babushkina. Before the road between Totma and Veliky Ustyug along the Sukhona was completed in the first decade of the 2000s, this was the only road connecting Vologda and Totma to Veliky Ustyug.

The only railroad in the district is the Monza Railroad, built for timber transport and operated by the timber production authorities, which runs along the border of Vologda and Kostroma Oblasts. The railroad crosses Babushkinsky District from west to east. Plans to extend it further east to Nikolsk were never implemented.

== Culture and recreation ==
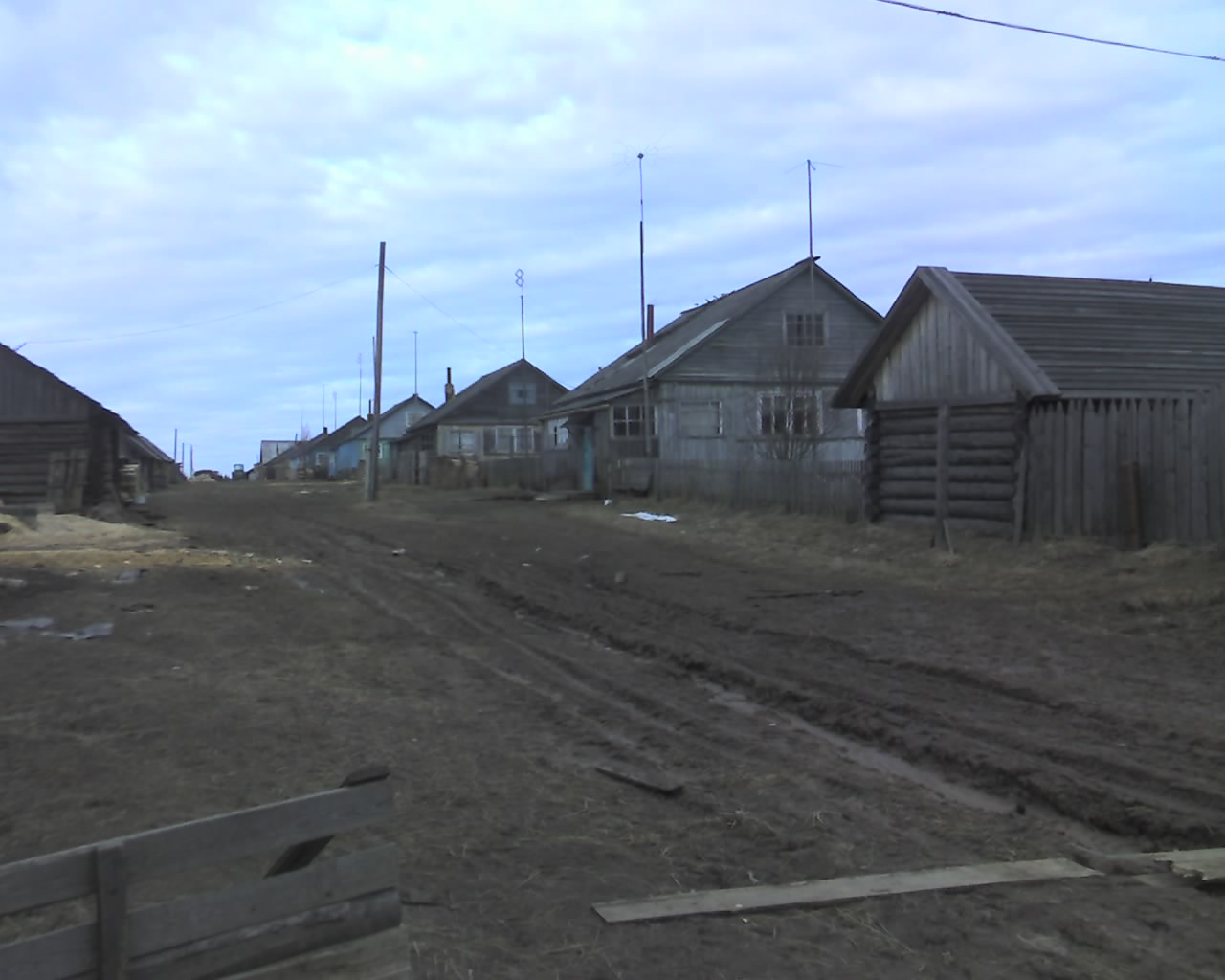
The village of Zhubrino

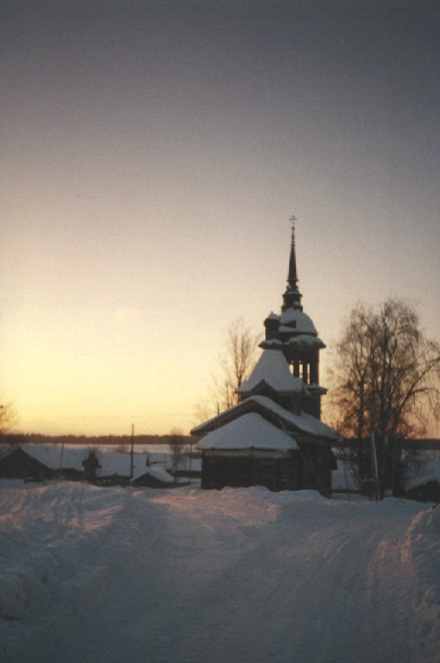
The St. Kosma and St. Damian church in the village of Logduz

The district contains 1 object classified as cultural heritage of the federal significance (a monument to Ivan Babushkin in the selo of imeni Babushkina) and 106 objects classified as cultural and historical heritage of local significance. Most of these are wooden farms and churches built before 1917.

The only state museum in the district is the Memorial Museum of Ivan Babushkin, located in imeni Babushkina.

The Ledengsk Spa Resort in imeni Babushkina uses underground lakes with high concentration of salt.
