= Pavino =

Pavino (Russian: Павино) is the name of several rural localities in Russia:

- Pavino (selo), Kostroma Oblast, a selo in Pavinskoye Settlement of Pavinsky District of Kostroma Oblast
- Pavino (village), Kostroma Oblast, a village in Pavinskoye Settlement of Pavinsky District of Kostroma Oblast
- Pavino, Novosibirsk Oblast, a settlement in Novosibirsky District of Novosibirsk Oblast
- Pavino, Sakhalin Oblast, a selo in Kholmsky District of Sakhalin Oblast
