= Yontala =

Location
- Country: Russia

Physical characteristics
- Mouth: Yug
  - coordinates: 60.0947°N 46.4667°E
- Length: 121 km (75 mi)
- Basin size: 1,450 km^{2} (560 sq mi)

Basin features
- Progression: Yug→ Northern Dvina→ White Sea

The Yontala (Russian: Ёнтала) is a river in Kichmengsko-Gorodetsky District, Vologda Oblast, Russia. It is a right tributary of the Yug. It is 121 kilometres (75 mi) long, and has a drainage basin of 1,450 square kilometres (560 sq mi).
