= Logduz =

Rural locality in Vologda Oblast, Russia

Coordinates: 60°00′N 44°44′E

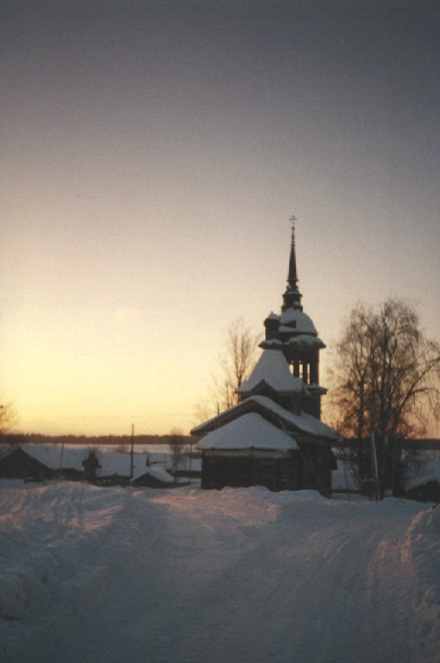
Church of Saints Cosmas and Damian in Logduz

Logduz (Russian: Ло́гдуз) is a rural locality (a village) in Babushkinsky District of Vologda Oblast, Russia, located on the Sharzhenga River, 370 kilometers (230 mi) from Vologda, the administrative center of the oblast. Population: about 300 (2002 est.). The telephone code for Logduz is 81745.

The name of the village originates from the Logduz River, a left tributary of the Sharzhenga.

Administratively, it serves as the administrative center of Logduzsky Selsoviet, one of the fifteen selsoviets into which the district is administratively divided. Municipally, it is the administrative center of Logduzskoye Rural Settlement.
