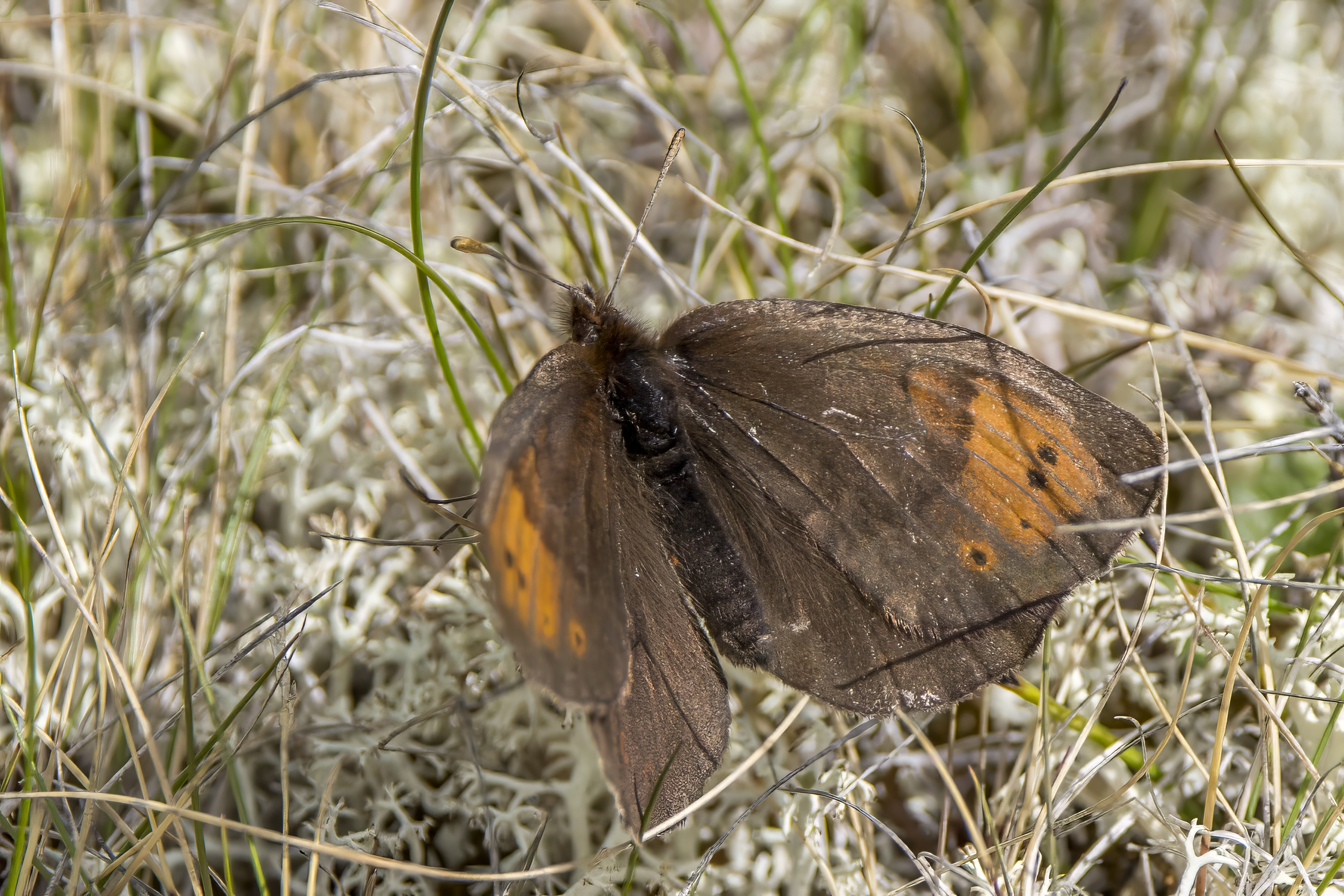

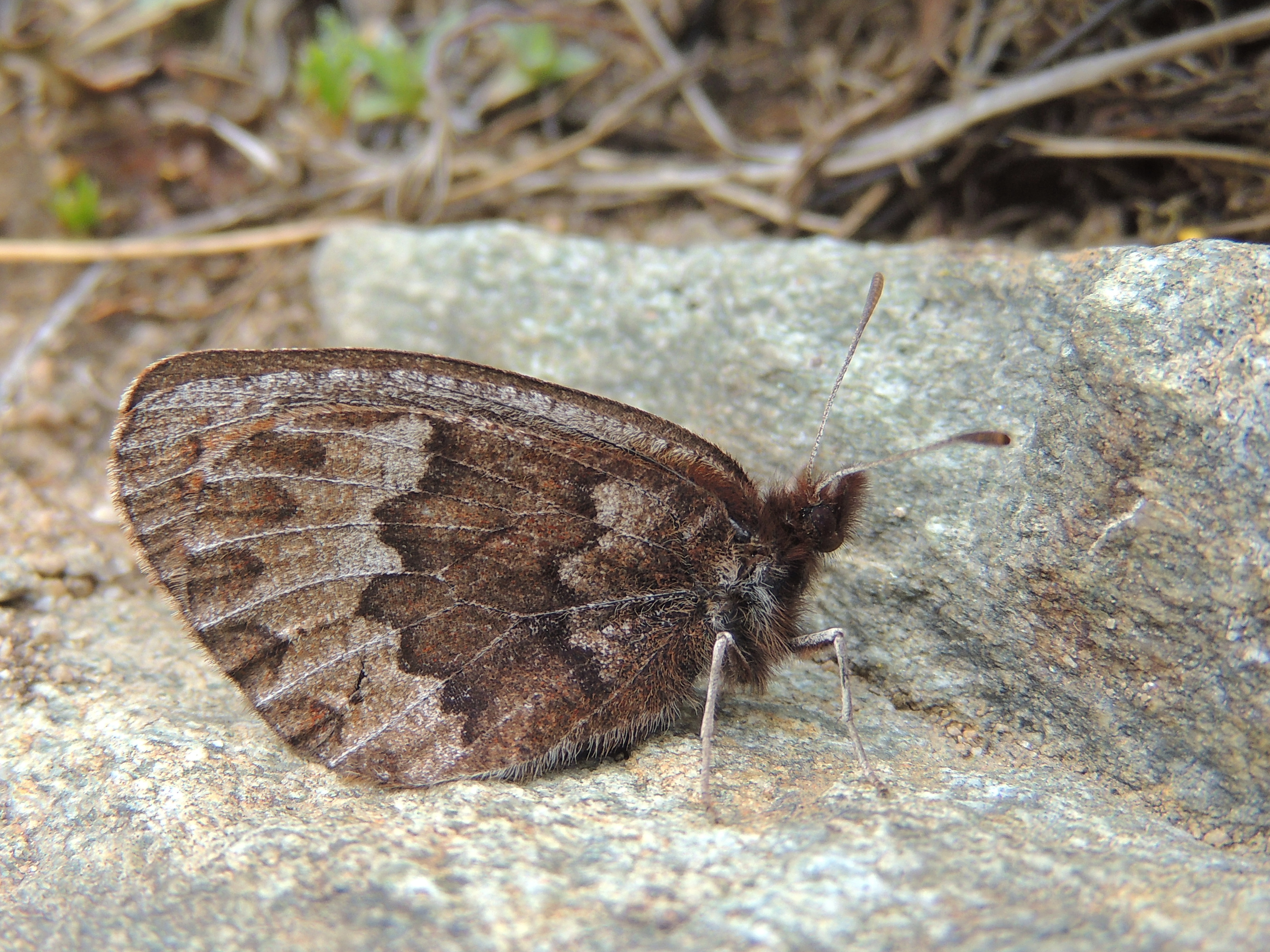

Scientific classification
- Kingdom: Animalia
- Phylum: Arthropoda
- Clade: Pancrustacea
- Class: Insecta
- Order: Lepidoptera
- Family: Nymphalidae
- Genus: Erebia
- Species: E. pandrose

Binomial name
- Erebia pandrose (Borkhausen, 1788)

Synonyms
- Erebia lappona

= Erebia pandrose =

Dewy ringlet

Species of butterfly

Erebia pandrose, the dewy ringlet, is a member of the subfamily Satyrinae of the family Nymphalidae . It is found from the Arctic areas of northern Europe, the Pyrenees, Alps, the Apennine Mountains, the Carpathian Mountains, Kola Peninsula and Kanin Peninsula, part of the Ural and the Altai and Sayan Mountains up to Mongolia.

The wingspan is 30–38 mm. The forewing upperside ground colour is brown adorned with an orange postmedian band interspersed by the veins and marked with a line of blind black ocelli. The hind wing upperside has line of discrete orange spots each centered with a blind black ocella . The underside of the forewings is copper orange with a line of blind black ocelli, the hindwing undersides are mottled beige grey and brown with a lighter broad band.

== Description in Seitz ==
E. lappona Esp. (= manto Frr., zilia Bkh.) (37 i). Upperside of both wings black-brown, somewhat glossy, the ground-colour of the female lighter, more grey-brown. The forewing with a rather broad russet brown band which does not reach the hindmargin and bears 4 black ocelli without pupils, the 2 upper ones standing close together and being somewhat shifted proximad. The band is not always equally distinct, varying in several directions. The hindwing has 3 - 4 black ocelli in russet -brown rings or is entirely unicolorous without markings. The forewing beneath with the central area russet -brown, the costal and distal margins being dusted with white-grey or bluish white, and the hindmargin black-brown. The ocelli as above, but mostly placed in russet -yellow rings. The hindwing beneath whitish or bluish grey with a median band which is bordered both proximally and distally by a thin brown dentate line. In the female this median band is more or less dusted with brown, the dentate lines being darker and broader and the band therefore more prominent than in the male. Before the distal margin there are 2 or 3 black dots which are sometimes absent. Head, thorax and abdomen black, the last ashy grey beneath. Antenna brown above, grey beneath, with yellow club. In the Pyrenees, Apennines, Alps and Carpathians, mostly only at considerable altitudes. — In ab. pollux Esp. (= dubius Fuessl, aglauros Hbst., baucis Schk.) the underside is dusted with white-grey, without markings; singly among the nymotypical form, in Graubunden and in Finmark. — ab. castor Esp. (= pandrose Bkh.) has the upperside duller in colour, bearing 2 subapical dots; the very evenly leaden-grey underside of the hindwing is traversed by 2 sharply marked black-brown dentate line. An insignificant aberration, which perhaps flies everywhere in the Alps among nymotypical specimens. — In the form sthennyo Grasl. which occurs in the Central Pyrenees, the distal band of the forewing is not russet-brown but yellowish red, being proximally but indistinctly or not at all defined. The ocelli bordered with yellow rings above and beneath. — In ab. stelviana Gumpp. the forewing has no ocelli above. From the Tirolese Alps, but occurs as aberration almost everywhere among nymotypical specimens. — In the northern form mantoides Btlr. the ocelli of the forewing beneath are contiguous, forming a chain. —The Central -European mountain-form as well as the arctic form, however, vary so much individually that nearly all the aberrational forms occur in both districts. — Larva adult grass-green; head, a dorsal line, lateral macular lines and the spiracles black. Feeds on grass, and contracts like a slug when being touched. In May it changes into an obtuse pupa, which lies free on the ground and has the anterior part of the body green and the abdomen brownish. The butterfly appears according to altitude either in June or August. In the Alps one usually meets with it only from the tree-line up to the snow. It flies especially on stony slopes with a sparse covering of grass and settles by preference on the ground, visiting flowers but rarely. It is very shy and therefore not easy to catch.

Adults are on wing from June to August. There is one generation per year.

The larvae mainly feed on Festuca, Poa and Sesleria species.
