= Imeni Babushkina =

imeni Babushkina имени Бабушкина
- Selo
- Interactive map of imeni Babushkina
- Location of imeni Babushkina imeni Babushkina (Vologda Oblast)
- Coordinates: 59°45′N 43°08′E
- Country: Russia
- Federal subject: Vologda Oblast
- Administrative district: Babushkinsky District
- Selsoviet: Babushkinsky Selsoviet

Population (2010 Census)
  - Total: 4,035
  - Estimate (2021): 3,842 (−4.8%)

Administrative status
  - Capital of: Babushkinsky District, Babushkinsky Selsoviet

Municipal status
  - Municipal district: Babushkinsky Municipal District
  - Rural settlement: Babushkinskoye Rural Settlement
  - Capital of: Babushkinsky Municipal District, Babushkinskoye Rural Settlement
- Time zone: UTC+3 (MSK)
- Postal code: 161350
- OKTMO ID: 19608404101

Imeni Babushkina (Russian: и́мени Ба́бушкина), formerly Ledengskoye (Russian: Леденгское), is a rural locality (a selo) and the administrative center of Babushkinsky District of Vologda Oblast, Russia, located on the banks of the Ledenga River. It also serves as the administrative center of Babushkinsky Selsoviet, one of the fifteen selsoviets into which the district is administratively divided. Municipally, it is the administrative center of Babushkinskoye Rural Settlement. Population: 4,035 (2010 census); 4,105 (2002 census); 4,487 (1989 Soviet census).

Prior to 1941, it was known as Ledengskoye. Both the district and the selo were renamed in March 1941 to commemorate Bolshevik revolutionary Ivan Babushkin, who was born in Ledengskoye.

== History ==
In the 14th century, salt was discovered in the valley of the Ledenga, and the selo of Ledengskoye was historically known for salt production. In the 19th century, Ledengskoye belonged to Totemsky Uyezd of Vologda Governorate. On July 15, 1929 Ledengsky District with the administrative center in the selo of Ledengskoye was established as part of Vologda Okrug of Northern Krai.

From 1841, the salt water of Ledengskoye was used for medical purposes. In 1989, the Ledengsk Spa Resort was open. The resort uses underground lakes with high concentration of salt.

== Economy ==
The salt production was traditionally the main occupation of the population of Ledengskoye, but it is extinct. The economy of babushkinsky District is based on timber production.

=== Transportation ===
A paved road connecting Totma with Nikolsk passes through Imeni Babushkina. Before the road between Totma and Veliky Ustyug along the Sukhona was completed in the 2000s, this was the only road connecting Vologda and Totma to Veliky Ustyug. There is regular bus traffic.

== Culture and recreation ==
Imeni Babushkina contains one object (a monument to Ivan Babushkin) classified as cultural heritage of the federal significance and eight objects classified as cultural and historical heritage of local significance. These are the buildings of Ledengskoye Salt Production Factory, the church ensemble, and the house where Ivan Babushkin was born.

The Memorial Museum of Ivan Babushkin is located in Imeni Babushkina.
