= Sharzhenga (river) =

Sharzhenga Russian: Шарженга
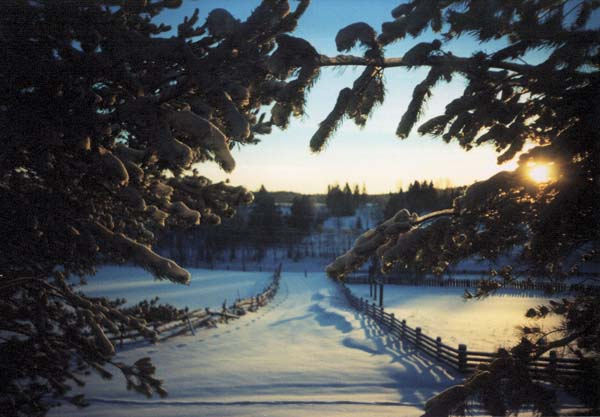
- Bridge over Sharzhenga in Logduz, Vologda Oblast

Location
- Country: Russia

Physical characteristics
- Mouth: Yug
  - coordinates: 59°46′35″N 45°23′53″E
  - elevation: 107 metres (351 ft)
- Length: 183 km (114 mi)
- Basin size: 1,500 km^{2} (580 sq mi)
- Discharge
  - average: 14 cubic metres per second (490 cu ft/s)

Basin features
- Progression: Yug→ Northern Dvina→ White Sea

The Sharzhenga (Russian: Шарженга, Шарженьга) is a river in Nyuksensky, Babushkinsky, and Nikolsky Districts of Vologda Oblast in Russia. It is a left tributary of the Yug. It is 183 kilometres (114 mi) long, and the area of its basin is 1,500 square kilometres (580 sq mi). The main tributary is the Andanga (right).

The river basin of the Sharzhenga comprises the northwestern part of Nikolsky District and is located in the Northern Ridge chain of hills.

The source of the Sharzhenga is in the southern part of the Nyuksensky District. The river flows south, enters Babushkinsky District, and turns northeast. In the village of Logduz it turns southeast and enters Nikolsky District. Downstream from the village of Zelentsovo the valley of the Sharzhenga is almost continuously populated, and the forests on the river banks have been cut. The mouth of the Sharzhenga is downstream of the village of Kalinino, between the town of Nikolsk and the selo of Kichmengsky Gorodok.
