= Shoyna =

Shoyna Шо́йна

Other transcription(s)
  - Nenets: Сояна’я
- Interactive map of Shoyna
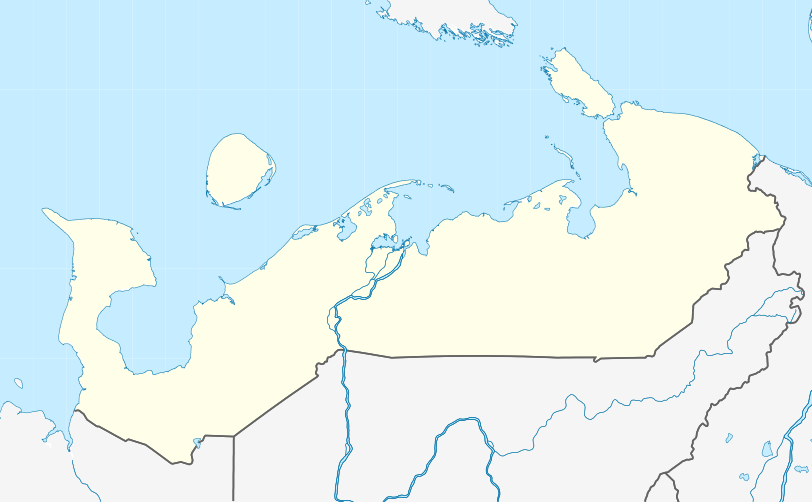
- Location of Shoyna Shoyna (Nenets Autonomous Okrug)
- Country: Russia
- Federal subject: Nenets Autonomous Okrug
- Founded: 1933
- Elevation: 83 m (272 ft)

Population (2010 Census)
  - Total: 300
  - Estimate (2021): 284 (−5.3%)
- Time zone: UTC+3 (MSK)
- Postal code: 166739
- Dialing code: +7 81857
- OKTMO ID: 11811476101

Shoyna (Russian: Шо́йна; Nenets: Сояна’я, Sojanaꜧja) (also spelled Shoina) is a coastal village (selo), located on the Kanin Peninsula in northern Nenets Autonomous Okrug, Russia. It had a population of 300 as of 2010.

It was founded in the 1930s by fishing families who named the settlement after the Shoyna ("cemetery" in Komi language) River. An abundance of fish and sea life led to prosperity within the collective farm organized there, and by the 1950s some 1,500 People lived in Shoyna with a fishing fleet numbering more than seventy vessels.

Ultimately, reckless trawling led to the utter annihilation of the benthic life, which decimated the fishery. More than half of the village is now buried under sand dunes deposited by the wind. It is thought that damage to permafrost and destruction of the sea bottom released the sand, which has overwhelmed residents' abilities to control the drifts. The collective farm no longer operates; today, just three hundred inhabitants live at Shoyna, supported mainly by unemployment benefits and pensions.

There is a lighthouse at Shoyna, built in 1960 as a navigational aid to mariners on the White Sea. Several shipwrecks line the shore as a testament to the treacherous waters. No roads or railroads connect the area with the south. Transportation to the outside world is by ship or air. The civilian airport is a dirt runway 650 metres in length. Local travel is by "truckcycles" (motorcycles with truck wheels).

In 1994, documentary filmmakers came to Shoyna and shot footage of the community. The resulting film, Zanesyonnyye Vetrom (Blown in with the Wind), was released in 2000. The village is also the subject of the documentary Between Sky and Sand (2017).

Shoyna lies immediately south of the 167 square kilometer Shoyninsky State Nature Reserve, established in 1997 to protect the spring and autumn staging area for the lesser white-fronted goose (Anser erythropus), an Arctic species threatened with extinction. In 2002, Dutch researchers discovered that the nearby Shoyna marsh is an important stopover site for brent and barnacle geese, with counts approaching almost ten percent of the total Russian flyway population.

== Climate ==
Shoyna has a subarctic climate (Dfc) with short, moderately warm summers and long, cold winters.

Climate data for Shoyna (Climate ID:22271)
Month	Jan	Feb	Mar	Apr	May	Jun	Jul	Aug	Sep	Oct	Nov	Dec	Year
Record high °C (°F)	9.3 (48.7)	3.2 (37.8)	3.4 (38.1)	9.5 (49.1)	21.7 (71.1)	30.0 (86.0)	32.1 (89.8)	28.1 (82.6)	21.0 (69.8)	12.1 (53.8)	7.2 (45.0)	3.7 (38.7)	32.1 (89.8)
Mean daily maximum °C (°F)	−8.0 (17.6)	−8.8 (16.2)	−5.5 (22.1)	−2.0 (28.4)	4.6 (40.3)	11.4 (52.5)	16.6 (61.9)	14.2 (57.6)	10.1 (50.2)	3.3 (37.9)	−1.5 (29.3)	−4.8 (23.4)	2.5 (36.4)
Daily mean °C (°F)	−12.0 (10.4)	−12.6 (9.3)	−9.3 (15.3)	−5.4 (22.3)	1.5 (34.7)	7.5 (45.5)	12.3 (54.1)	11.0 (51.8)	7.8 (46.0)	1.3 (34.3)	−4.1 (24.6)	−8.2 (17.2)	−0.9 (30.5)
Mean daily minimum °C (°F)	−16.5 (2.3)	−16.9 (1.6)	−13.5 (7.7)	−9.2 (15.4)	−1.0 (30.2)	4.4 (39.9)	8.8 (47.8)	8.2 (46.8)	5.4 (41.7)	−0.9 (30.4)	−7.3 (18.9)	−12.2 (10.0)	−4.2 (24.4)
Record low °C (°F)	−39.3 (−38.7)	−40.2 (−40.4)	−34.3 (−29.7)	−28.6 (−19.5)	−19.9 (−3.8)	−4.6 (23.7)	−1.1 (30.0)	−1.2 (29.8)	−5.6 (21.9)	−19.2 (−2.6)	−32.4 (−26.3)	−35.5 (−31.9)	−40.2 (−40.4)
Average precipitation mm (inches)	28.0 (1.10)	21.6 (0.85)	22.3 (0.88)	21.6 (0.85)	25.9 (1.02)	33.6 (1.32)	39.1 (1.54)	45.4 (1.79)	50.3 (1.98)	50.0 (1.97)	32.5 (1.28)	30.1 (1.19)	400.4 (15.77)
Average precipitation days	19.9	17.3	17.0	14.3	13.0	12.3	11.4	14.5	16.8	20.6	19.6	21.3	198
Source: climatebase.ru
