= Kanin Peninsula =

Peninsula in the Nenets Autonomous Okrug, Russia

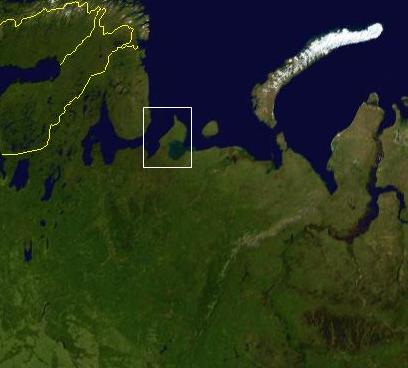
- Location of the Kanin Peninsula.

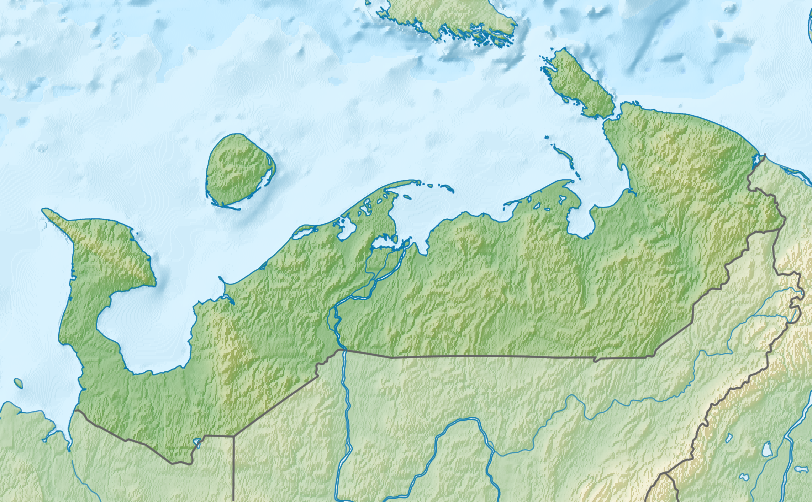
- Location within Nenets Autonomous Okrug Location within European Russia

Geography
- Location: Nenets Autonomous Okrug, Russia
- Coordinates: 67°N 45°E
- Adjacent to: White Sea, Barents Sea

Administration
- Russia

The Kanin Peninsula (Russian: Канин) is a large peninsula in Nenets Autonomous Okrug, Russia.

== Geography ==
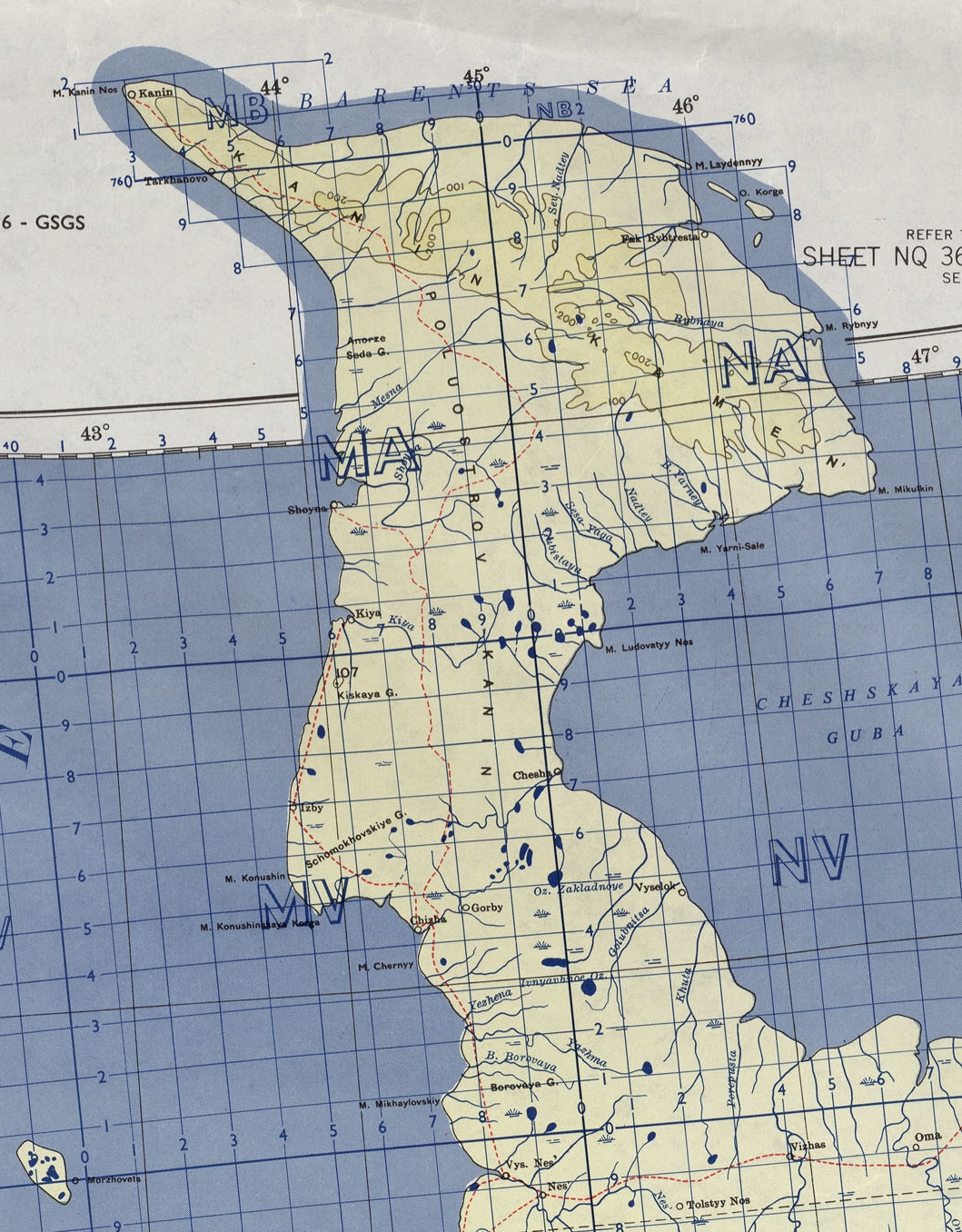
Kanin Peninsula - US Army map 1956

It is surrounded by the White Sea to the west and by the Barents Sea to the north and east.

Shoyna (also spelled Shoina) is one of the few communities on the peninsula and situated on the western side. A settlement of some 300 people in 2010, historically it had a much larger population (1,500 in the 1950s). However, the destruction of the local fishing industry as a result of overfishing led to a loss of population in the region, resulting in much of the settlement being reclaimed by sand. An airstrip and lighthouse are also near Shoyna.

== Fauna ==
For cetaceans, beluga whales are most commonly found. Male sperm whales are known to occur as well.

=== Butterflies ===
There are 29 butterfly species in the forest-tundra and 14 species in the hypoarctic tundra. The data on the fauna and distribution of species in the forest-tundra of the Kanin Peninsula are generally typical of this natural zone. The most abundant species are Erebia disa, Oeneis norna, Clossiana freija, Pieris napi, and Vacciniina optilete. The dominant species in southern tundra localities are Erebia euryale, Erebia pandrose, and Boloria aquilonaris, which coincides with the result of the 1903 research. A high abundance of E. pandrose is a specific feature of the northern part of the Kanin Peninsula and Kolguev Island, pointing to the connection of the biota of these territories with the subarctic regions of Fennoscandia.

== Climate ==
The climate on the Kanin Peninsula has cold winters with moderate maritime influences and cool summers. The north has a tundra climate (ET) and the south a subarctic climate (Dfc) thanks to the warmer summers.

Climate data for Cape Kanin Nos (Köppen ET), 1991-2020 normals
Month	Jan	Feb	Mar	Apr	May	Jun	Jul	Aug	Sep	Oct	Nov	Dec	Year
Record high °C (°F)	4.0 (39.2)	2.9 (37.2)	2.4 (36.3)	9.0 (48.2)	19.7 (67.5)	26.3 (79.3)	30.5 (86.9)	28.1 (82.6)	20.4 (68.7)	12.2 (54.0)	10.5 (50.9)	8.2 (46.8)	30.5 (86.9)
Mean daily maximum °C (°F)	−5.4 (22.3)	−6.3 (20.7)	−4.6 (23.7)	−1.6 (29.1)	2.4 (36.3)	8.0 (46.4)	12.3 (54.1)	11.2 (52.2)	8.3 (46.9)	4.0 (39.2)	0.1 (32.2)	−2.4 (27.7)	2.2 (35.9)
Daily mean °C (°F)	−7.6 (18.3)	−8.6 (16.5)	−6.7 (19.9)	−3.4 (25.9)	0.3 (32.5)	5.2 (41.4)	9.5 (49.1)	9.0 (48.2)	6.7 (44.1)	2.6 (36.7)	−1.5 (29.3)	−4.4 (24.1)	0.1 (32.2)
Mean daily minimum °C (°F)	−10.1 (13.8)	−11.0 (12.2)	−8.6 (16.5)	−5.3 (22.5)	−1.4 (29.5)	3.0 (37.4)	7.1 (44.8)	7.3 (45.1)	5.2 (41.4)	1.0 (33.8)	−3.4 (25.9)	−6.4 (20.5)	−1.9 (28.6)
Record low °C (°F)	−31.7 (−25.1)	−33.1 (−27.6)	−29.6 (−21.3)	−30.6 (−23.1)	−16.7 (1.9)	−6.5 (20.3)	−1.9 (28.6)	−0.7 (30.7)	−3.1 (26.4)	−13.4 (7.9)	−22.4 (−8.3)	−30.0 (−22.0)	−33.1 (−27.6)
Average precipitation mm (inches)	39.1 (1.54)	30.6 (1.20)	27.3 (1.07)	21.9 (0.86)	23.8 (0.94)	33.3 (1.31)	35.1 (1.38)	47.3 (1.86)	45.4 (1.79)	53.9 (2.12)	42.0 (1.65)	38.2 (1.50)	437.9 (17.22)
Average precipitation days (≥ 1.0 mm)	12	10	9	7	6	7	7	9	11	15	14	13	120
Average snowy days	22	21	21	17	13	5	0.4	0.3	2	15	21	24	162
Average relative humidity (%)	88	89	89	87	87	86	87	90	88	86	87	88	88
Mean monthly sunshine hours	0.6	23.4	84.0	130.4	144.3	160.5	177.8	111.9	74.0	25.0	2.9	0.0	934.8
Source 1: NOAA
Source 2: Weatherbase(snowy days) Hong Kong Observatory

Climate data for Shoyna (Köppen Dfc)
Month	Jan	Feb	Mar	Apr	May	Jun	Jul	Aug	Sep	Oct	Nov	Dec	Year
Record high °C (°F)	9.3 (48.7)	3.2 (37.8)	3.4 (38.1)	9.5 (49.1)	21.7 (71.1)	30.0 (86.0)	32.1 (89.8)	28.1 (82.6)	21.0 (69.8)	12.1 (53.8)	7.2 (45.0)	3.7 (38.7)	32.1 (89.8)
Mean daily maximum °C (°F)	−8.0 (17.6)	−8.8 (16.2)	−5.5 (22.1)	−2.0 (28.4)	4.6 (40.3)	11.4 (52.5)	16.6 (61.9)	14.2 (57.6)	10.1 (50.2)	3.3 (37.9)	−1.5 (29.3)	−4.8 (23.4)	2.5 (36.4)
Daily mean °C (°F)	−12.0 (10.4)	−12.6 (9.3)	−9.3 (15.3)	−5.4 (22.3)	1.5 (34.7)	7.5 (45.5)	12.3 (54.1)	11.0 (51.8)	7.8 (46.0)	1.3 (34.3)	−4.1 (24.6)	−8.2 (17.2)	−0.9 (30.5)
Mean daily minimum °C (°F)	−16.5 (2.3)	−16.9 (1.6)	−13.5 (7.7)	−9.2 (15.4)	−1.0 (30.2)	4.4 (39.9)	8.8 (47.8)	8.2 (46.8)	5.4 (41.7)	−0.9 (30.4)	−7.3 (18.9)	−12.2 (10.0)	−4.2 (24.4)
Record low °C (°F)	−39.3 (−38.7)	−40.2 (−40.4)	−34.3 (−29.7)	−28.6 (−19.5)	−19.9 (−3.8)	−4.6 (23.7)	−1.1 (30.0)	−1.2 (29.8)	−5.6 (21.9)	−19.2 (−2.6)	−32.4 (−26.3)	−35.5 (−31.9)	−40.2 (−40.4)
Average precipitation mm (inches)	28.0 (1.10)	21.6 (0.85)	22.3 (0.88)	21.6 (0.85)	25.9 (1.02)	33.6 (1.32)	39.1 (1.54)	45.4 (1.79)	50.3 (1.98)	50.0 (1.97)	32.5 (1.28)	30.1 (1.19)	400.4 (15.77)
Average precipitation days	19.9	17.3	17.0	14.3	13.0	12.3	11.4	14.5	16.8	20.6	19.6	21.3	198
Source: climatebase.ru
