= Amderminsky District =

Former Soviet district

Amderminsky district (Russian: Амдерминский район) was a former district (raion) of the Nenets National Okrug in the former RSFSR of the Soviet Union. It existed from 1940 to 1959.

== Location ==
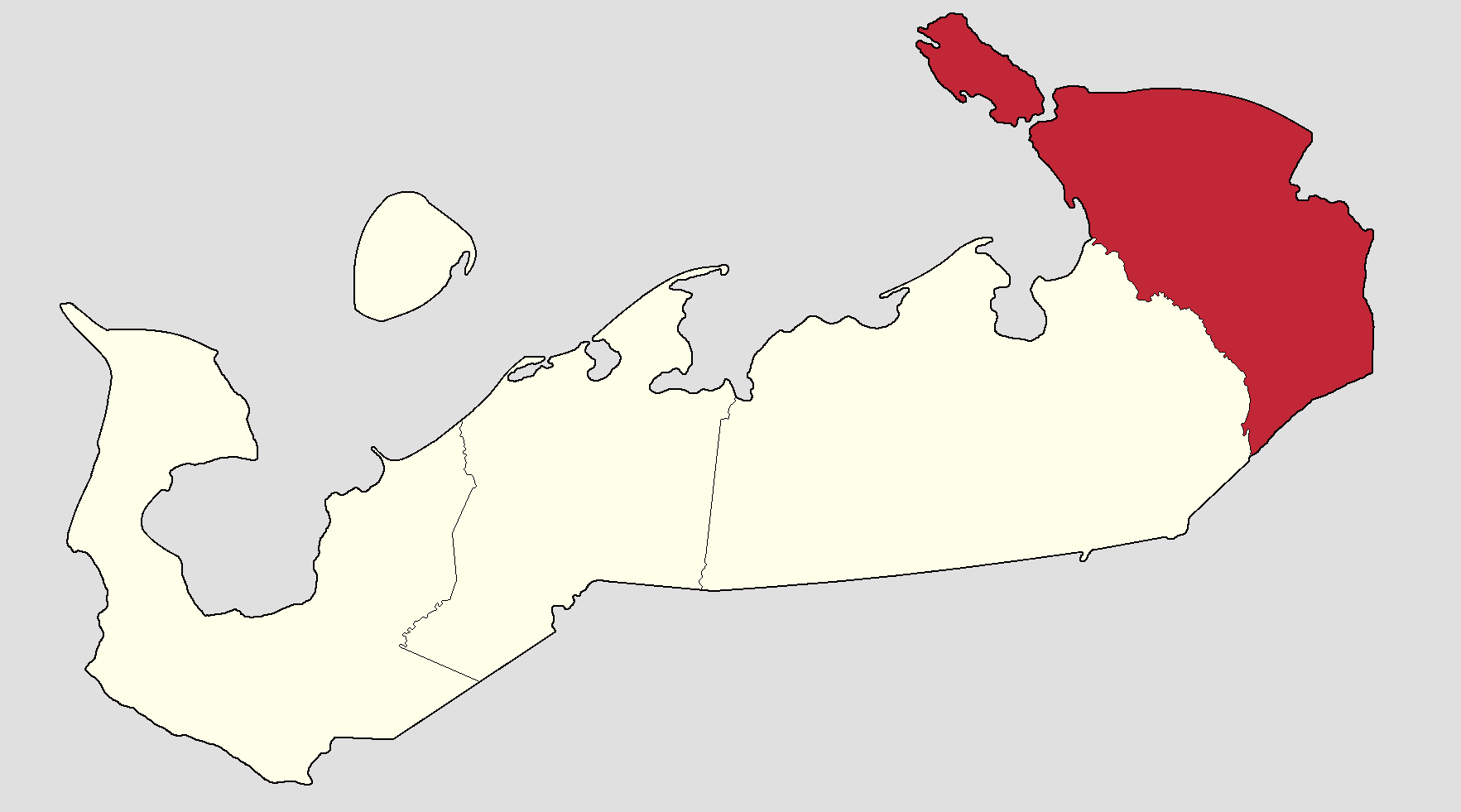
Former Amderminsky district on a map of Nenetsia

Amderminsky district was located at the east end of the Nenets Autonomous Okrug. The district's area was 64,300 km^{2}. The administrative centre was the town of Amderma.

== History ==
The district was formed on 11 July 1940 from part of the Bolshezemelsky district, containing three selsoviets:

- Vaygach Island selsoviet
- Karsky selsoviet
- Yushar selsoviet

In 1959, Amderminsky district was abolished along with all other districts in the Nenets AO, and became a direct subordination. Today, it is a part of Zapolyarny district, which is the only district in Nenets AO.

== Media ==
A newspaper company, called Polyarnaya Zvezda (Polar Miner), published newspapers in Amderma and the Anderminsky district from 1937 until the district was abolished.
