= Yug (river) =

Yug Russian: Юг
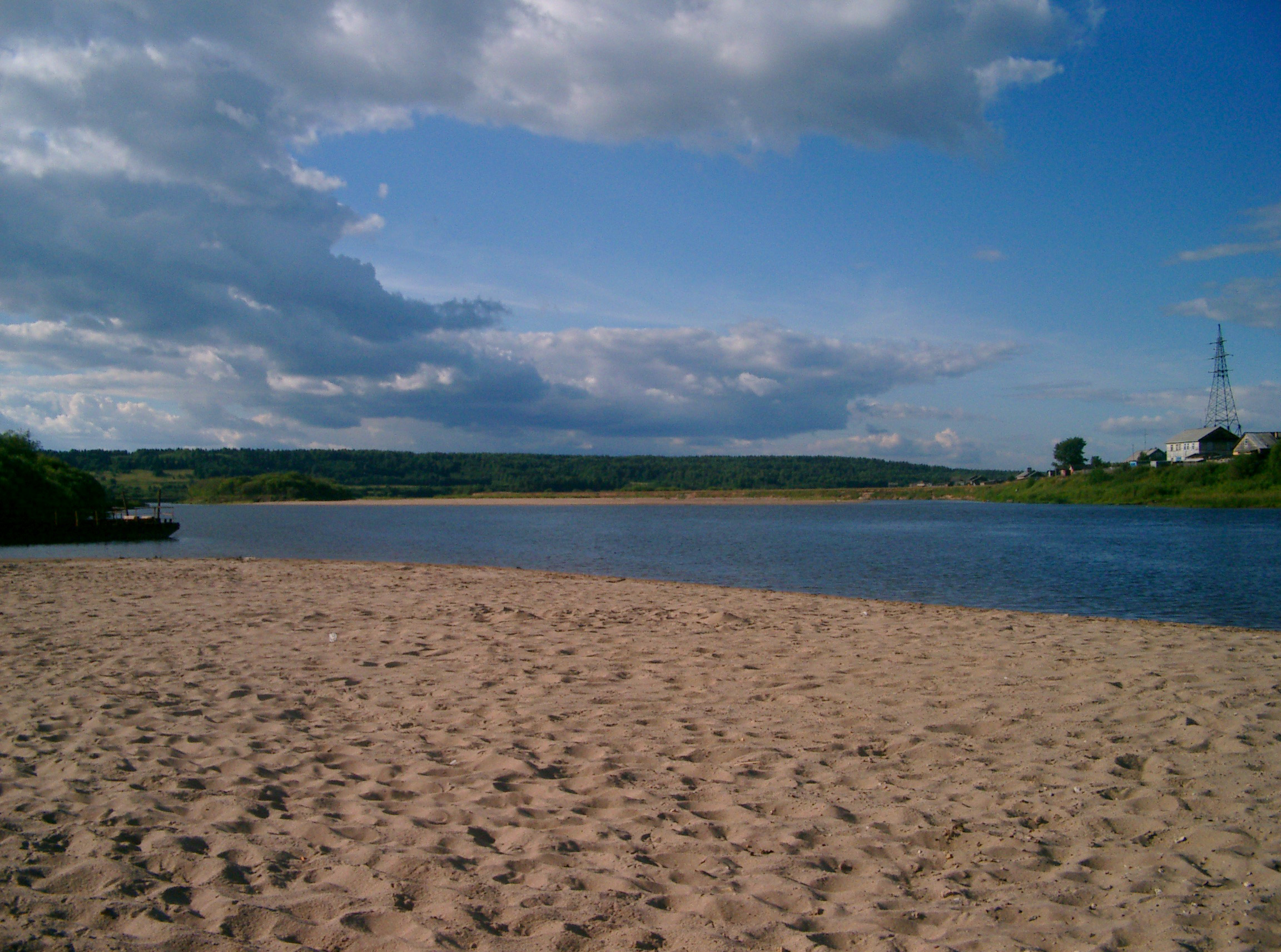
- The Yug in Podosinovets

Location
- Country: Russia

Physical characteristics
- Mouth: Northern Dvina
  - coordinates: 60.7278°N 46.325°E
- Length: 574 km (357 mi)
- Basin size: 35,600 square kilometres (13,700 mi^{2})
- Discharge
  - average: 292 cubic metres per second (10,300 cu ft/s)

Basin features
- Progression: Northern Dvina→ White Sea

Map of the Northern Dvina basin. The Yug is shown on the map.

The Yug (Russian: Юг) is a river in Kichmengsko-Gorodetsky, Nikolsky, and Velikoustyugsky Districts of Vologda Oblast and in Podosinovsky District of Kirov Oblast in Russia. It is 574-kilometer (357 mi) long, and the area of its basin is 35,600 square kilometers (13,700 sq mi). The Yug joins the Sukhona near the town of Veliky Ustyug, forming the Northern Dvina, one of the biggest rivers of European Russia.

The principal tributaries of the Yug are the Sharzhenga (left), the Kichmenga (left), the Yontala (right), the Pushma (right), and the Luza (right). Most of the course of the Yug runs through the Northern Ridge, and the Yug is one of the biggest rivers crossing the ridge.

The name of the river is identical to the Russian word for "south", but has Finno-Ugric origins and originates from the Komi word ju, which means "water". It is cognate with joki "river" in the most river names in Finland and further with Oka, Vuoksi, Vakh, Yogan, etc. in Russia.

The towns of Veliky Ustyug and Nikolsk, as well as the district centers Kichmengsky Gorodok and Podosinovets, are located on the banks of the Yug.

The source of the Yug is in the southern part of Kichmensko-Gorodetsky District, south of the village of Kaleplikha. The river flows southwest, then enters Nikolsky District, runs all the way almost to the border of Kostroma Oblast and sharply turns northwest. The town of Nikolsk is located on both banks of the Yug, and upstream from Nikolsk the valley is already densely populated. Downstream from Nikolsk, the Yug is navigable, although there is no passenger navigation with the exception of several ferry crossings. The river course runs further to the north, re-enters Kichmengsko-Gorodetsky District, turns northeast, accepts the Kichmenga from the left in the selo of Kichmengsky Gorodok, and enters Kirov Oblast. In Podosinovets, the Yug accepts the Pushma from the right, turns north, then turns west, and enters Velikoustyugsky District of Vologda Oblast. The Yug accepts the Luza, its biggest tributary, from the right, and turns north before joining the Sukhona.

There are a number of bridges in the upper course of the Yug, but downstream from Kichmengsky Gorodok there is only one bridge, located in Podosinovets.

== History ==
In 14th-15th century the upper course of the Yug, around Nikolsk, was a disputed territory between Grand Duchy of Moscow and Novgorod Republic. Novgorod controlled the major part of Russian North, and, in particular, all areas along the Sukhona, whereas Moscow controlled Veliky Ustyug, which it inherited from the Vladimir-Suzdal Principality. The Yug was the waterway Moscow used to get to Veliky Ustyug. In the end of 15th century, Novgorod was appended to the Grand Duchy of Moscow, and Nikolsk became one of the key points on the way from Moscow to the White Sea, which until 1703 was the main route for the foreign trade in Russia. In particular, the harbor in Nikolsk was used to transport cargo.
