= Yarygino, Vologodsky District, Vologda Oblast =

Yarygino Ярыгино
- Village
- Location within Vologda Oblast Location within Russia
- Coordinates: 59°16′N 39°52′E
- Country: Russia
- Region: Vologda Oblast
- District: Vologodsky District
- Time zone: UTC+3:00

Yarygino (Russian: Ярыгино) is a rural locality (a village) in Semyonkovskoye Rural Settlement, Vologodsky District, Vologda Oblast, Russia. The population was 22 as of 2002.

== Geography ==
Yarygino is located 8 km north of Vologda (the district's administrative centre) by road. Aleksino is the nearest rural locality.
