= Rovdino =

Rovdino (Russian: Ровдино) is the name of several rural localities in Russia:

- Rovdino, Arkhangelsk Oblast, a selo in Rovdinsky Selsoviet of Shenkursky District of Arkhangelsk Oblast
- Rovdino, Vologda Oblast, a village in Nizhneyerogodsky Selsoviet of Velikoustyugsky District of Vologda Oblast
