= Pavino (selo), Kostroma Oblast =

Rural locality in Kostroma Oblast, Russia

Coordinates: 59°06′49″N 46°09′04″E

Pavino (Russian: Па́вино) is a rural locality (a selo) and the administrative center of Pavinsky District, Kostroma Oblast, Russia. Population: 2,821 (2010 Census); 3,024 (2002 Census); 3,405 (1989 Soviet census).
