= Kanino-Timansky District =

Kanino-Timansky District was a former district (raion) of the Nenets National Okrug in the RSFSR of the former Soviet Union. The district existed from 1929 to 1959.

== Location ==
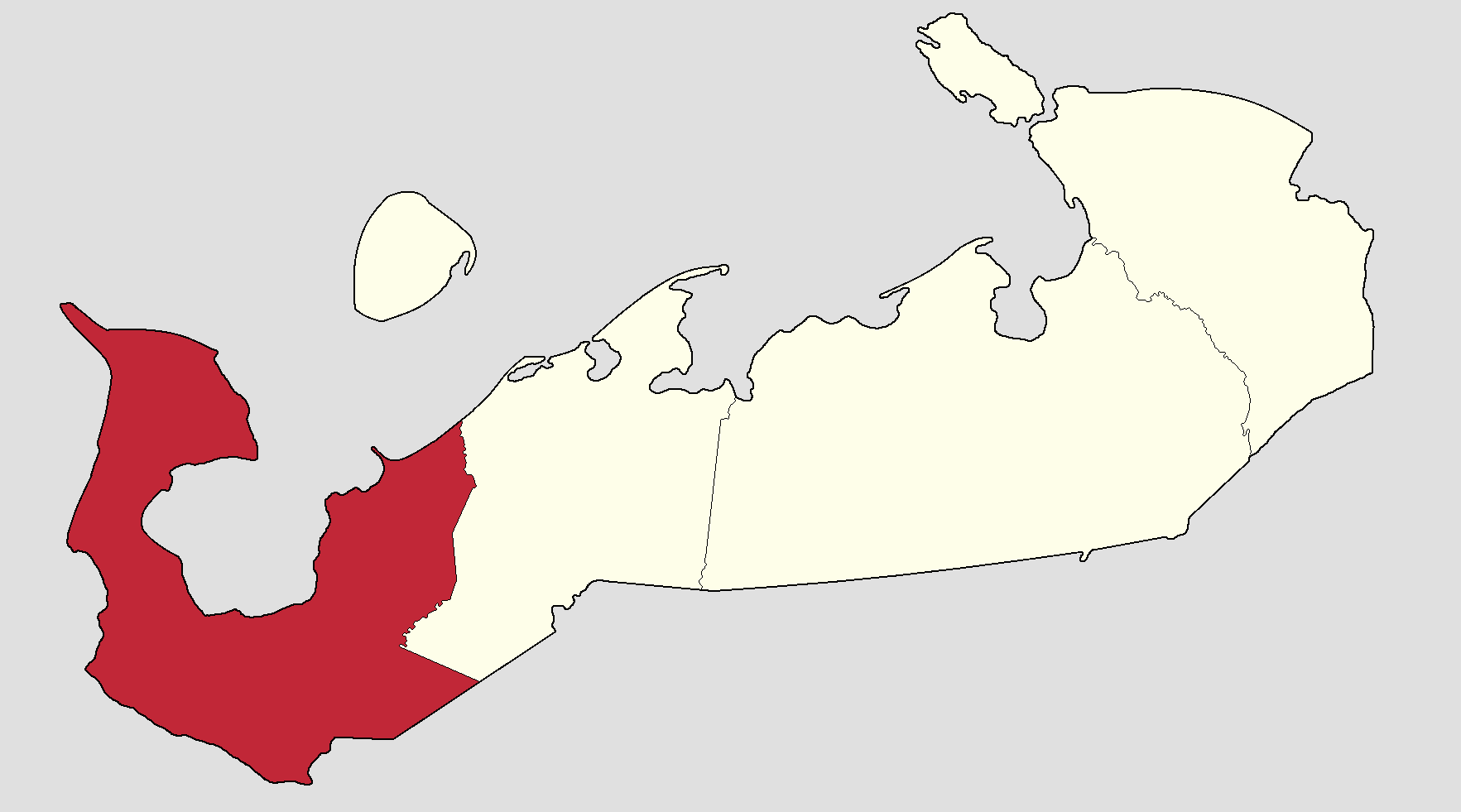
Kanino-Timansky district on a map of Nenetsia

Kanino-Timansky district was located in the far west of the Nenets Autonomous Okrug, on the Kanin Peninsula and some of the mainland, and close to the Timan Ridge, which is probably where the district got its name from. Its territory was mostly formed in a curve around Chosha Bay.

== History ==
The district was formed on 15 July 1929, from a part of the Mezensky District of the Arkhangelsk Governorate. The administrative center of the district was the settlement of Nizhnyaya Pyosha. As of 1 January 1939, the district had an area of 53,100km^{2} and it had a population of 2,700. It included 16 settlements in 4 selsoviets.

In 1939, the number of selsoviets had increased to 6:

- Indigsky
- Malozemelsky
- Nessky
- Omsky
- Pyoshsky
- Shoynsky

By 1940, this number had increased again to 7 and the district itself increased in size to 63,500km^{2}.

In 1959, all of the districts in the Nenets Autonomous Okrug, including Kanino-Timansky district, were abolished and became directly subordinated to Naryan-Mar. Today, the former territory of Kanino-Timansky district is a part of the Zapolyarny District, the only one in the Nenets AO.

== Media ==
One newspaper company, called "The Socialist Arctic", existed in the district from 1932 until the district was abolished.
