= Roslyatino =

Roslyatino (Russian: Рослятино) is the name of several rural localities in Vologda Oblast, Russia:

- Roslyatino, Babushkinsky District, Vologda Oblast, a selo in Roslyatinsky Selsoviet of Babushkinsky District
- Roslyatino, Vologodsky District, Vologda Oblast, a village in Veprevsky Selsoviet of Vologodsky District
