= Bolshezemelsky District =

Bolshezemelsky District (also informally known as Nenetsky District) was a former district (raion) of the Nenets National Okrug in the former RSFSR of the Soviet Union. The district existed from 1929 to 1959.

== Location ==
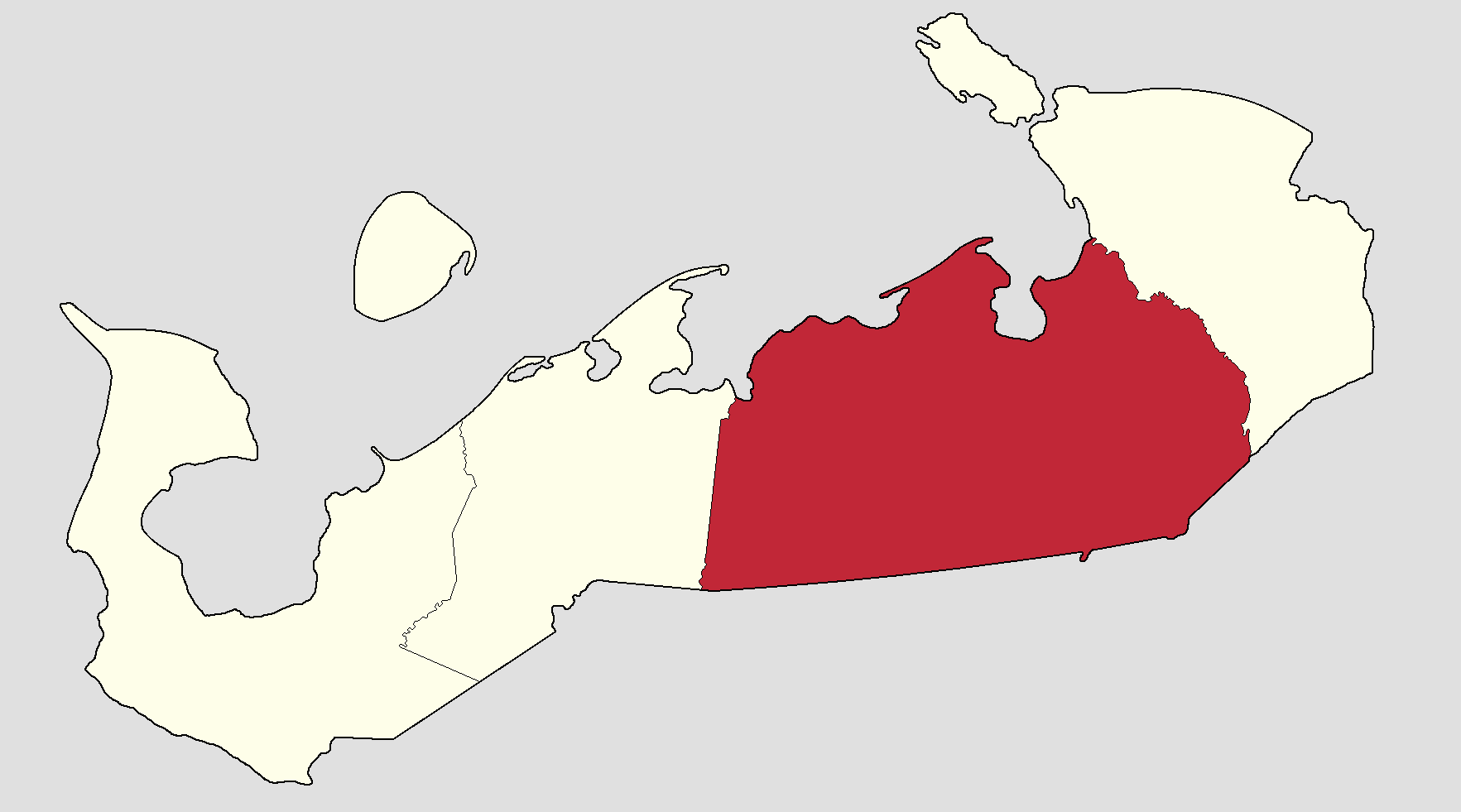
Bolshezemelsky District on the map of Nenetsia

Bolshezemelsky district was located in the central-east of the Nenets Autonomous Okrug. It shared borders with the Nizhne-Pechorsky district in the west and the Amderminsky district in the east, as well as the Usinsk and Inta Urban Okrugs in the Komi Republic (which the district was formerly a part of).

== History ==
The district was formed on 15 July 1929 from a part of the Izhmo-Pechora Uyezd of the Komi Autonomous Oblast, the administrative centre of the district at Hoseda-Hard. As of 1 January 1931, the district had an area of 144,300km^{2} and a population of 4,200 people across 12 selsoviets.

By 1 January 1940, the area of the district had decreased to 96,900km^{2}, with the number of selsoviets now at 6. On 11 July of the same year, Amderminsky District was formed from the eastern area of Bolshezemelsky district, with three selsoviets included, with Bolshezemelsky district now also having three selsoviets.

The district was abolished along with the three others in Nenets AO in 1959, becoming a direct subordination. Today it is a part of Zapolyarny district, the only one in Nenets AO.

== Media ==
Two newspaper companies operated in the district: "Reindeer Husbandry" - issued from 1 January 1944 to 5 January 1956 in Hoseda-Hard "The Arctic Coalman" - issued from 1 January 1958 to 1 October 1959 in Khalmer-Yu (now a part of the Komi Republic)
