= Vokhomsky District =

Vokhomsky District Вохомский район (Russian)
- District
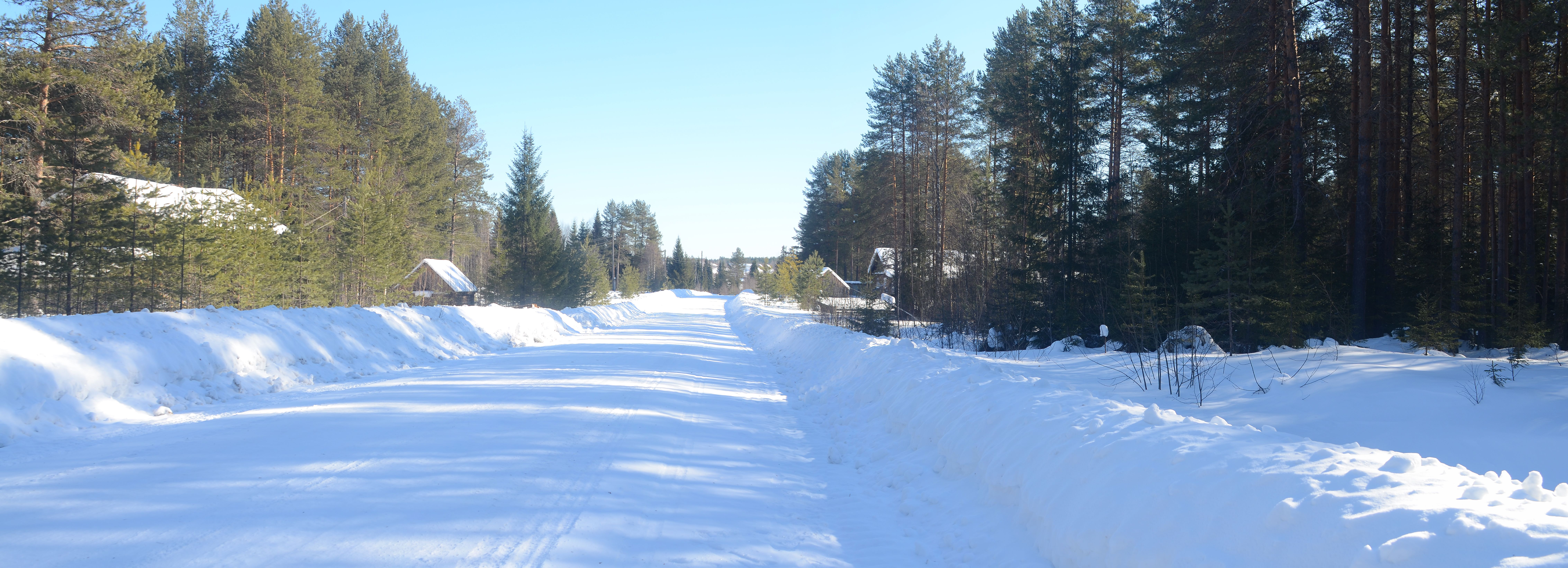
- Winter road in Vokhomsky District

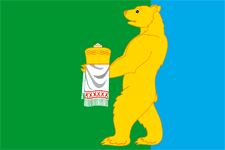
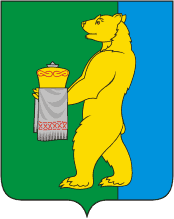
- Flag Coat of arms
- Location of Vokhomsky District in Kostroma Oblast
- Coordinates: 58°55′41″N 46°45′36″E
- Country: Russia
- Federal subject: Kostroma Oblast
- Established: 10 April 1924
- Administrative center: Vokhma

Area
  - Total: 3,400 km^{2} (1,300 sq mi)

Population (2010 Census)
  - Total: 10,152
  - Density: 3.0/km^{2} (7.7/sq mi)
  - Urban: 0%
  - Rural: 100%

Administrative structure
  - Administrative divisions: 6 Settlements
  - Inhabited localities: 181 rural localities

Municipal structure
  - Municipally incorporated as: Vokhomsky Municipal District
  - Municipal divisions: 0 urban settlements, 6 rural settlements
- Time zone: UTC+3 (MSK)
- OKTMO ID: 34606000
- Website: http://www.vohma.ru/

Vokhomsky District (Russian: Во́хомский райо́н) is an administrative and municipal district (raion), one of the twenty-four in Kostroma Oblast, Russia. It is located in the east of the oblast. The area of the district is 3,400 square kilometers (1,300 sq mi). Its administrative center is the rural locality (a settlement) of Vokhma. Population: 6,948 (2021 census); 10,152 (2010 census); 13,444 (2002 Census); 16,891 (1989 Soviet census). The population of Vokhma accounts for 56.5% of the district's total population.
