= Khoseda-Khardsky =

Khoseda-Khardsky Хоседа-Хардский
- Rural locality
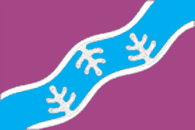
- Flag
- Interactive map of Khoseda-Khardsky
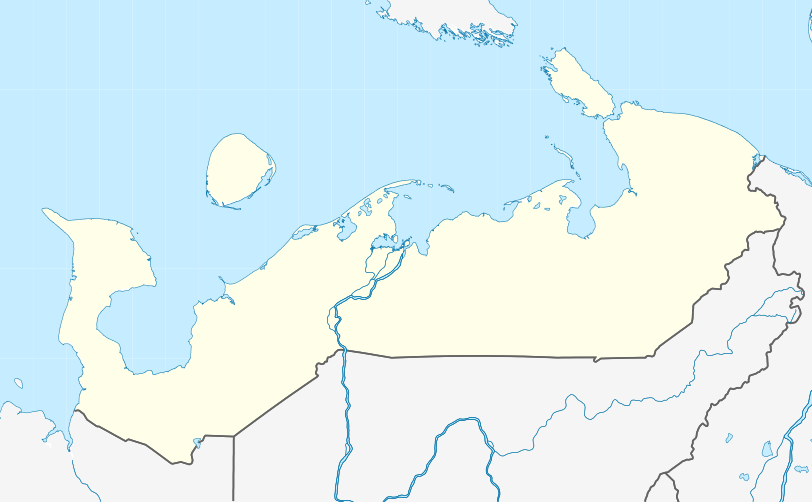
- Location of Khoseda-Khardsky Khoseda-Khardsky (Nenets Autonomous Okrug)
- Coordinates: 67°01′N 59°22′E
- Country: Russia
- Federal subject: Nenets Autonomous Okrug

Population (2010 Census)
  - Total: 538
  - Estimate (2023): 503 (−6.5%)

Administrative status
  - Subordinated to: Zapolyarny District
- Time zone: UTC+3 (MSK)
- OKTMO ID: 11811473

Khoseda-Khardsky (Russian: Хоседа-Хардский), sometimes written as Khoseda-Khard, Hoseda-Hardsky, or Hoseda-Hard is a rural locality in Zapolyarny District, Nenets Autonomous Okrug, Russia. Its center is the village (selo) of Kharuta. Population: 538 (2010 census);

== Transportation ==
Khoseda-Khardsky is served by the Kharuta Airport.

== Climate ==
Khoseda-Khardsky has a subarctic climate (Köppen climate classification Dfc). Winters are severely cold with average temperatures from −24.5 °C (−12 °F) to −15.4 °C (4 °F) in January, while summers are mild with average temperatures from 7.3 °C (45 °F) to 19.0 °C (66 °F). Precipitation is moderate, and is somewhat higher from July to October than at other times of the year.

Climate data for Khoseda-Khardsky
Month	Jan	Feb	Mar	Apr	May	Jun	Jul	Aug	Sep	Oct	Nov	Dec	Year
Record high °C (°F)	2.2 (36.0)	2.6 (36.7)	9.3 (48.7)	16.8 (62.2)	29.4 (84.9)	32.5 (90.5)	34.3 (93.7)	30.8 (87.4)	24.8 (76.6)	17.0 (62.6)	8.0 (46.4)	3.5 (38.3)	34.3 (93.7)
Mean maximum °C (°F)	−2.1 (28.2)	−2.7 (27.1)	1.9 (35.4)	6.8 (44.2)	16.5 (61.7)	27.2 (81.0)	29.4 (84.9)	23.9 (75.0)	17.8 (64.0)	7.9 (46.2)	1.4 (34.5)	−0.3 (31.5)	29.9 (85.8)
Mean daily maximum °C (°F)	−15.4 (4.3)	−15.2 (4.6)	−9.6 (14.7)	−3.1 (26.4)	3.6 (38.5)	13.8 (56.8)	19.0 (66.2)	15.2 (59.4)	8.7 (47.7)	−0.6 (30.9)	−8.2 (17.2)	−12.5 (9.5)	−0.4 (31.3)
Daily mean °C (°F)	−19.7 (−3.5)	−19.3 (−2.7)	−14.6 (5.7)	−8.1 (17.4)	−0.7 (30.7)	8.2 (46.8)	13.0 (55.4)	10.2 (50.4)	4.8 (40.6)	−3.4 (25.9)	−11.8 (10.8)	−16.5 (2.3)	−4.8 (23.3)
Mean daily minimum °C (°F)	−24.5 (−12.1)	−24.0 (−11.2)	−19.7 (−3.5)	−13.0 (8.6)	−4.6 (23.7)	3.1 (37.6)	7.3 (45.1)	5.5 (41.9)	1.5 (34.7)	−6.5 (20.3)	−15.9 (3.4)	−21.0 (−5.8)	−9.3 (15.2)
Mean minimum °C (°F)	−40.7 (−41.3)	−41.0 (−41.8)	−36.4 (−33.5)	−29.9 (−21.8)	−15.0 (5.0)	−2.8 (27.0)	0.9 (33.6)	−1.8 (28.8)	−6.9 (19.6)	−18.6 (−1.5)	−32.9 (−27.2)	−40.1 (−40.2)	−45.4 (−49.7)
Record low °C (°F)	−52.0 (−61.6)	−56.4 (−69.5)	−47.9 (−54.2)	−40.2 (−40.4)	−27 (−17)	−8.1 (17.4)	−3.3 (26.1)	−8.0 (17.6)	−11.7 (10.9)	−35.5 (−31.9)	−44.6 (−48.3)	−51.1 (−60.0)	−56.4 (−69.5)
Average precipitation mm (inches)	26.8 (1.06)	21.8 (0.86)	19.9 (0.78)	20.1 (0.79)	30.6 (1.20)	40.9 (1.61)	55.5 (2.19)	60.5 (2.38)	56.0 (2.20)	48.1 (1.89)	32.7 (1.29)	28.5 (1.12)	441.4 (17.37)
Average precipitation days	17.6	13.1	16.2	14.2	11.8	12.8	9.4	14.6	16.1	22.8	17.3	16.8	182.7
Average relative humidity (%)	84.0	81.9	83.5	82.9	79.4	75.8	74.8	83.1	87.7	92.9	87.3	84.7	83.2
Mean monthly sunshine hours	7	49	126	205	193	256	282	172	83	46	15	2	1,436
Source 1: climatebase.ru (1936-2008) Météo climat stats Météo Climat
Source 2: NOAA (sun only, 1961-1990)
