= Vokhma =

Rural locality in Kostroma Oblast, Russia

Coordinates: 58°55′47″N 46°45′26″E

Vokhma (Russian: Во́хма) is a rural locality (a settlement) and the administrative center of Vokhomsky District, Kostroma Oblast, Russia. Population: 3,928 (2021 census); 4,386 (2010 census); 4,785 (2002 census); 4,953 (1989 Soviet census).
