= Totemsky Uyezd =

Totemsky Uyezd (Russian: Тотемский уезд) was one of the subdivisions of the Vologda Governorate of the Russian Empire. It was situated in the southwestern part of the governorate. Its administrative centre was Totma. In terms of present-day administrative borders, the territory of Totemsky Uyezd is divided between the Totemsky, Sokolsky, Mezhdurechensky, Babushkinsky and Tarnogsky districts of Vologda Oblast.

== Demographics ==
At the time of the Russian Empire Census of 1897, Totemsky Uyezd had a population of 146,819. Of these, 99.9% spoke Russian as their native language.
