= Pavinsky District =

Pavinsky District Павинский район (Russian)
- District
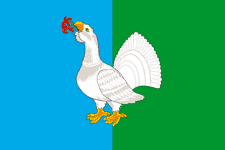
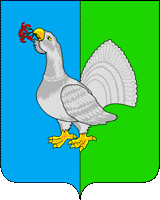
- Flag Coat of arms
- Location of Pavinsky District in Kostroma Oblast
- Coordinates: 59°06′47″N 46°08′14″E
- Country: Russia
- Federal subject: Kostroma Oblast
- Administrative center: Pavino

Area
  - Total: 1,600 km^{2} (620 sq mi)

Population (2010 Census)
  - Total: 5,102
  - Density: 3.2/km^{2} (8.3/sq mi)
  - Urban: 0%
  - Rural: 100%

Administrative structure
  - Administrative divisions: 4 Settlements
  - Inhabited localities: 100 rural localities

Municipal structure
  - Municipally incorporated as: Pavinsky Municipal District
  - Municipal divisions: 0 urban settlements, 4 rural settlements
- Time zone: UTC+3 (MSK)
- OKTMO ID: 34632000
- Website: https://xn--80aesufb.xn--p1ai/

Pavinsky District (Russian: Па́винский райо́н) is an administrative and municipal district (raion), one of the twenty-four in Kostroma Oblast, Russia. It is located in the northeast of the oblast. The area of the district is 1,600 square kilometers (620 sq mi). Its administrative center is the rural locality (a selo) of Pavino. Population: 3,115 (2021 census); 5,102 (2010 census); 6,217 (2002 Census); 7,933 (1989 Soviet census). The population of Pavino accounts for 55.3% of the district's total population.
