= Cherevkovo =

Cherevkovo (Russian: Черевково) is the name of several rural localities in Russia:

- Cherevkovo, Arkhangelsk Oblast, a selo in Cherevkovsky Selsoviet of Krasnoborsky District of Arkhangelsk Oblast
- Cherevkovo, Pskov Oblast, a village in Dnovsky District of Pskov Oblast
- Cherevkovo, Rostov Oblast, a settlement in Udarnikovskoye Rural Settlement of Krasnosulinsky District of Rostov Oblast
