= Oparino, Oparinsky District, Kirov Oblast =

Oparino Опарино
- Urban-type settlement
- Interactive map of Oparino
- Location of Oparino Oparino (Kirov Oblast)
- Coordinates: 59.8490°N 48.2810°E
- Country: Russia
- Federal subject: Kirov Oblast
- Administrative district: Oparinsky District
- Founded: 1899
- Elevation: 186 m (610 ft)

Population (2010 Census)
  - Total: 4,440
  - Estimate (2025): 3,581 (−19.3%)
- Time zone: UTC+3 (MSK)
- Postal code: 141366
- OKTMO ID: 33629151051

Oparino (Russian: Опарино) is an urban locality (an urban-type settlement) in Oparinsky District of Kirov Oblast, Russia. Population: 4,440 (2010 census); 5,142 (2002 census); 5,862 (1989 Soviet census).
