= Oparinsky District =

Oparinsky District Опаринский район (Russian)
- District
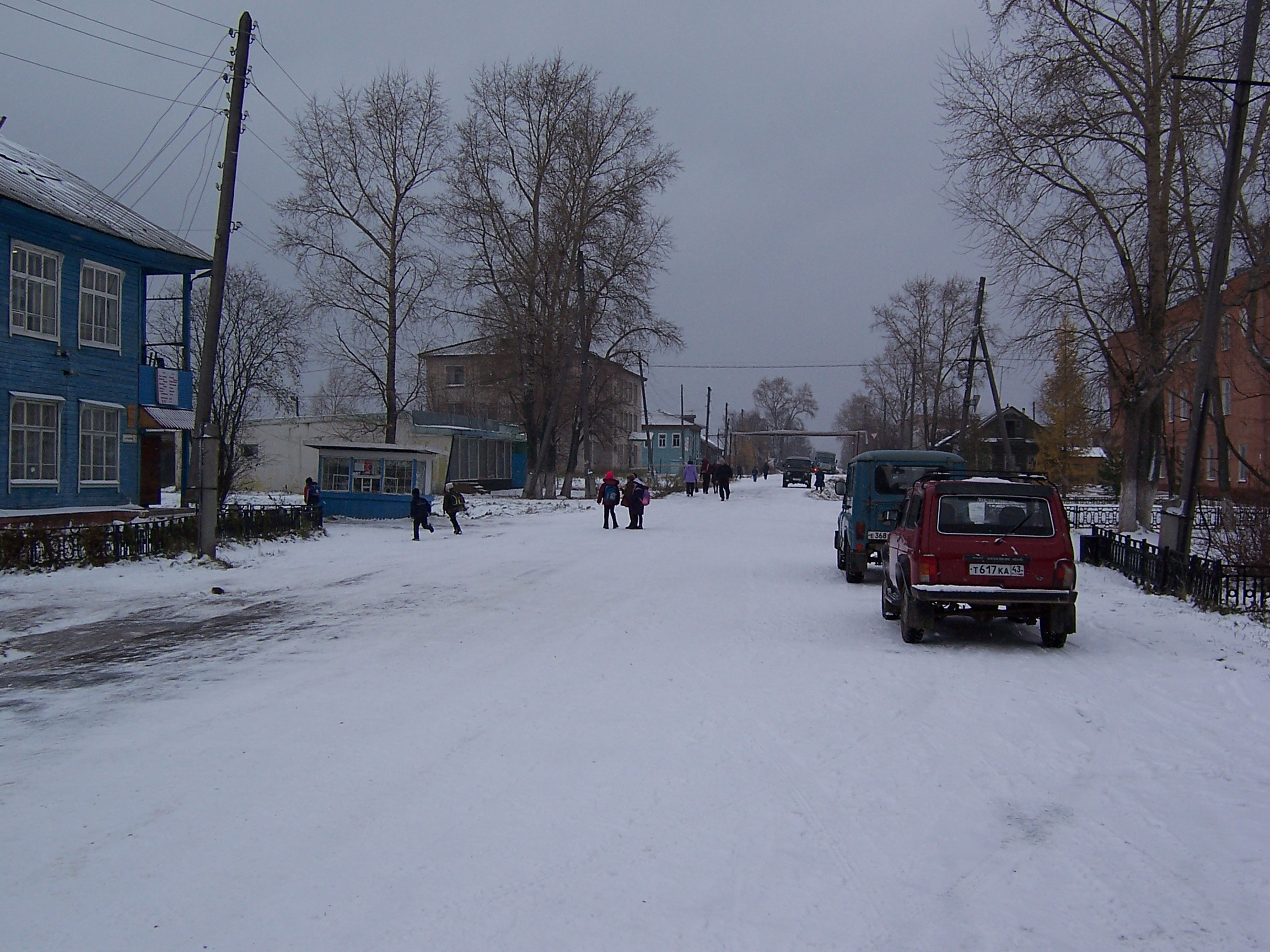
- Settlement Oparino, Oparinsky District

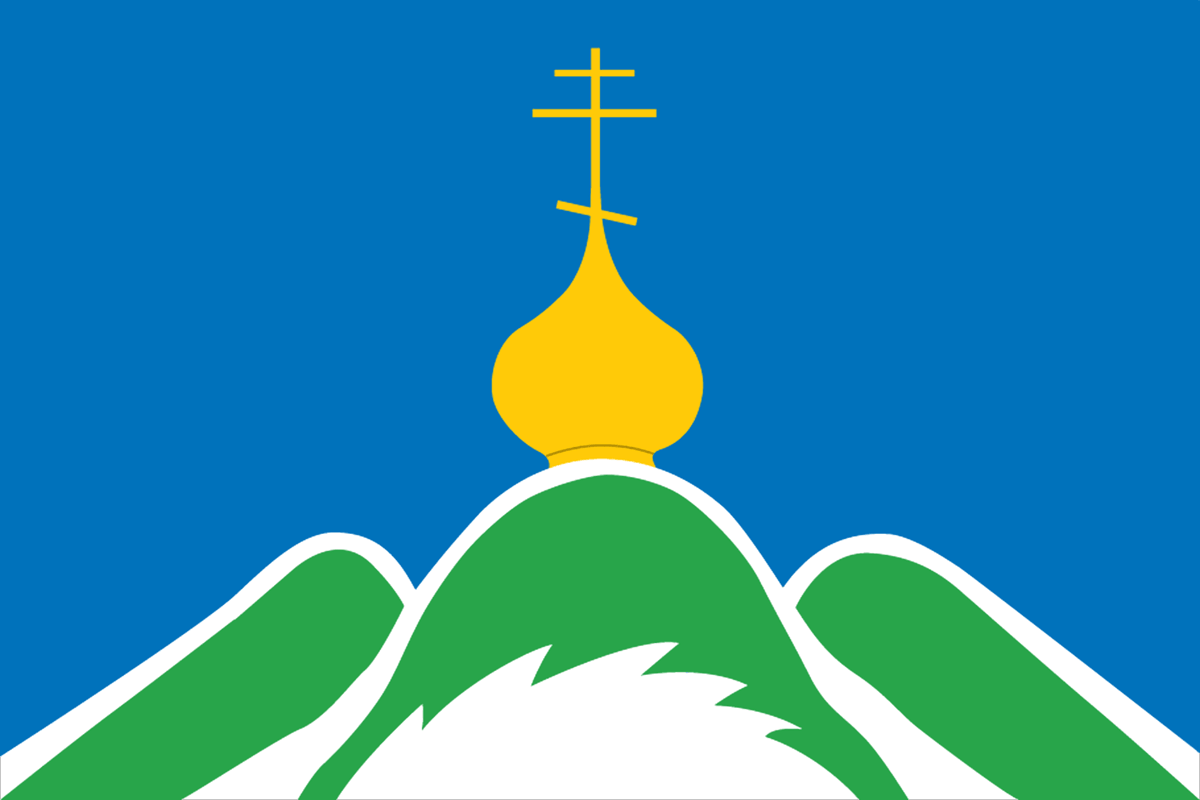
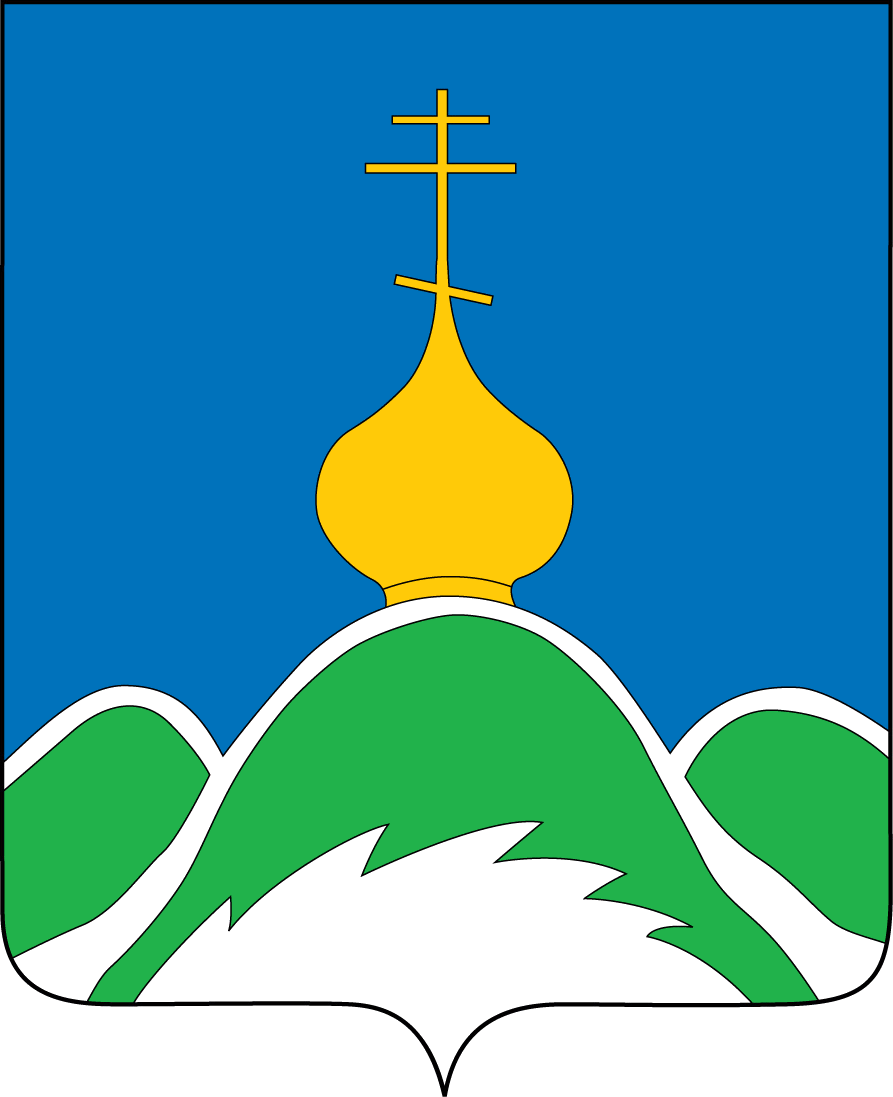
- Flag Coat of arms
- Location of Oparinsky District in Kirov Oblast
- Coordinates: 59°50′52″N 48°17′01″E
- Country: Russia
- Federal subject: Kirov Oblast
- Established: 10 April 1924
- Administrative center: Oparino

Area
  - Total: 6,043 km^{2} (2,333 sq mi)

Population (2010 Census)
  - Total: 11,795
  - Density: 1.952/km^{2} (5.055/sq mi)
  - Urban: 37.6%
  - Rural: 62.4%

Administrative structure
  - Administrative divisions: 1 Urban-type settlements, 7 Rural okrugs
  - Inhabited localities: 1 urban-type settlements, 40 rural localities

Municipal structure
  - Municipally incorporated as: Oparinsky Municipal District
  - Municipal divisions: 1 urban settlements, 7 rural settlements
- Time zone: UTC+3 (MSK)
- OKTMO ID: 33629000
- Website: http://oparino-oms.ru/

Oparinsky District (Russian: Опа́ринский райо́н) is an administrative and municipal district (raion), one of the thirty-nine in Kirov Oblast, Russia. It is located in the northwest of the oblast. The area of the district is 6,043 square kilometers (2,333 sq mi). Its administrative center is the urban locality (an urban-type settlement) of Oparino. Population: 11,795 (2010 census); 14,631 (2002 Census); 18,201 (1989 Soviet census). The population of Oparino accounts for 37.6% of the district's total population.
