= List of rural localities in Kostroma Oblast =

Map of Russia with Kostroma Oblast highlighted

This is a list of rural localities in Kostroma Oblast. Kostroma Oblast (Russian: Костромска́я о́бласть, Kostromskaya oblast) is a federal subject of Russia (an oblast). Its administrative center is the city of Kostroma and its population as of the 2010 Census is 667,562. It was formed in 1944 on the territory detached from neighboring Yaroslavl Oblast.

== Antropovsky District ==
Rural localities in Antropovsky District:

- Antropovo

== Chukhlomsky District ==
Rural localities in Chukhlomsky District:

- Kuznetsovo

== Galichsky District ==
Rural localities in Galichsky District:

- Ababkovo

== Mezhevskoy District ==
Rural localities in Mezhevskoy District:

- Georgiyevskoye

== Oktyabrsky District ==
Rural localities in Oktyabrsky District

- Bogovarovo

== Ostrovsky District ==
Rural localities in Ostrovsky District

- Ostrovskoye

== Parfenyevsky District ==
Rural localities in Parfenyevsky District:

- Parfenyevo

== Pavinsky District ==
Rural localities in Pavinsky District:

- Pavino

== Pyshchugsky District ==
Rural localities in Pyshchugsky District:

- Pyshchug

== Sharyinsky District ==
Rural localities in Sharyinsky District:

- Borovskoy
- Lugovoy

== Sudislavsky District ==
Rural localities in Sudislavsky District:

- Mirnyy
- Zapadnyy

== Vokhomsky District ==
Rural localities in Vokhomsky District:

- Vokhma

== See also ==
- Lists of rural localities in Russia
