= Kuznetsovo =

Kuznetsovo (Russian: Кузнецово) is the name of several rural localities in Russia:

- Kuznetsovo, Altai Krai
- Kuznetsovo, Amur Oblast
- Kuznetsovo, Chukhlomsky District, Kostroma Oblast
- Kuznetsovo, Vereshchaginsky District, Perm Krai
- Kuznetsovo, Vladimir Oblast
- Kuznetsovo, Belozersky District, Vologda Oblast
- Kuznetsovo, Nikolsky District, Vologda Oblast
- Kuznetsovo, Velikoustyugsky District, Vologda Oblast
- Kuznetsovo, Zabaykalsky Krai
