= Borok =

Borok (Russian: Борок) is the name of several rural localities in Russia.

== Altai Krai ==
As of 2010, one rural locality in Altai Krai bears this name:

- Borok, Altai Krai, a settlement in Borkovsky Selsoviet of Pospelikhinsky District

== Arkhangelsk Oblast ==
As of 2010, six rural localities in Arkhangelsk Oblast bear this name:

- Borok, Kholmogorsky District, Arkhangelsk Oblast, a village in Khavrogorsky Selsoviet of Kholmogorsky District
- Borok, Kotlassky District, Arkhangelsk Oblast, a village in Pacheozersky Selsoviet of Kotlassky District
- Borok, Krasnoborsky District, Arkhangelsk Oblast, a village in Berezonavolotsky Selsoviet of Krasnoborsky District
- Borok, Lensky District, Arkhangelsk Oblast, a village in Safronovsky Selsoviet of Lensky District
- Borok, Verkhnetoyemsky District, Arkhangelsk Oblast, a village in Fedkovsky Selsoviet of Verkhnetoyemsky District
- Borok, Vilegodsky District, Arkhangelsk Oblast, a village in Selyansky Selsoviet of Vilegodsky District

== Irkutsk Oblast ==
As of 2010, one rural locality in Irkutsk Oblast bears this name:

- Borok, Irkutsk Oblast, a khutor in Tayshetsky District

== Ivanovo Oblast ==
As of 2010, one rural locality in Ivanovo Oblast bears this name:

- Borok, Ivanovo Oblast, a selo in Yuzhsky District

== Kaliningrad Oblast ==
As of 2010, one rural locality in Kaliningrad Oblast bears this name:

- Borok, Kaliningrad Oblast, a settlement in Gavrilovsky Rural Okrug of Ozyorsky District

== Kaluga Oblast ==
As of 2010, one rural locality in Kaluga Oblast bears this name:

- Borok, Kaluga Oblast, a village in Kuybyshevsky District

== Kirov Oblast ==
As of 2010, four rural localities in Kirov Oblast bear this name:

- Borok, Pizhansky District, Kirov Oblast, a village in Izhevsky Rural Okrug of Pizhansky District
- Borok, Yakhrengsky Rural Okrug, Podosinovsky District, Kirov Oblast, a village in Yakhrengsky Rural Okrug of Podosinovsky District
- Borok, Podosinovets, Podosinovsky District, Kirov Oblast, a village under the administrative jurisdiction of the urban-type settlement of Podosinovets, Podosinovsky District
- Borok, Sovetsky District, Kirov Oblast, a village in Lesnikovsky Rural Okrug of Sovetsky District

== Kostroma Oblast ==
As of 2010, five rural localities in Kostroma Oblast bear this name:

- Borok, Buysky District, Kostroma Oblast, a selo in Tsentralnoye Settlement of Buysky District
- Borok, Kologrivsky District, Kostroma Oblast, a settlement in Ileshevskoye Settlement of Kologrivsky District
- Borok, Kostromskoy District, Kostroma Oblast, a village in Apraksinskoye Settlement of Kostromskoy District
- Borok, Ostrovsky District, Kostroma Oblast, a village in Klevantsovskoye Settlement of Ostrovsky District
- Borok, Sudislavsky District, Kostroma Oblast, a village in Sudislavskoye Settlement of Sudislavsky District

== Kurgan Oblast ==
As of 2010, one rural locality in Kurgan Oblast bears this name:

- Borok, Kurgan Oblast, a village in Uglovskoy Selsoviet of Kurtamyshsky District

== Nizhny Novgorod Oblast ==
As of 2010, three rural localities in Nizhny Novgorod Oblast bear this name:

- Borok, Pavlovsky District, Nizhny Novgorod Oblast, a village under the administrative jurisdiction of the town of district significance of Gorbatov in Pavlovsky District
- Borok, Perevozsky District, Nizhny Novgorod Oblast, a settlement in Tanaykovsky Selsoviet of Perevozsky District
- Borok, Vetluzhsky District, Nizhny Novgorod Oblast, a settlement in Moshkinsky Selsoviet of Vetluzhsky District

== Novgorod Oblast ==
As of 2010, sixteen rural localities in Novgorod Oblast bear this name:

- Borok, Batetsky District, Novgorod Oblast, a village in Moykinskoye Settlement of Batetsky District
- Borok, Demyansky District, Novgorod Oblast, a village in Zhirkovskoye Settlement of Demyansky District
- Borok, Kholmsky District, Novgorod Oblast, a village in Togodskoye Settlement of Kholmsky District
- Borok, Ruchyevskoye Settlement, Krestetsky District, Novgorod Oblast, a village in Ruchyevskoye Settlement of Krestetsky District
- Borok, Ustvolmskoye Settlement, Krestetsky District, Novgorod Oblast, a village in Ustvolmskoye Settlement of Krestetsky District
- Borok, Lyubytinsky District, Novgorod Oblast, a village under the administrative jurisdiction of the urban-type settlement of Lyubytino in Lyubytinsky District
- Borok, Malovishersky District, Novgorod Oblast, a village in Burginskoye Settlement of Malovishersky District
- Borok, Maryovsky District, Novgorod Oblast, a village in Molvotitskoye Settlement of Maryovsky District
- Borok, Novgorodsky District, Novgorod Oblast, a village in Borkovskoye Settlement of Novgorodsky District
- Borok, Okulovsky District, Novgorod Oblast, a village in Berezovikskoye Settlement of Okulovsky District
- Borok, Poddorsky District, Novgorod Oblast, a village in Belebelkovskoye Settlement of Poddorsky District
- Borok, Shimsky District, Novgorod Oblast, a village in Utorgoshskoye Settlement of Shimsky District
- Borok, Soletsky District, Novgorod Oblast, a village in Dubrovskoye Settlement of Soletsky District
- Borok, Ivanovskoye Settlement, Starorussky District, Novgorod Oblast, a village in Ivanovskoye Settlement of Starorussky District
- Borok, Novoselskoye Settlement, Starorussky District, Novgorod Oblast, a village in Novoselskoye Settlement of Starorussky District
- Borok, Volotovsky District, Novgorod Oblast, a village in Gorskoye Settlement of Volotovsky District

== Pskov Oblast ==
As of 2010, sixteen rural localities in Pskov Oblast bear this name:

- Borok (Lyushchikskaya Rural Settlement), Bezhanitsky District, Pskov Oblast, a village in Bezhanitsky District; municipally, a part of Lyushchikskaya Rural Settlement of that district
- Borok (Polistovskoye Rural Settlement), Bezhanitsky District, Pskov Oblast, a village in Bezhanitsky District; municipally, a part of Polistovskoye Rural Settlement of that district
- Borok (Dubishenskaya Rural Settlement), Dedovichsky District, Pskov Oblast, a village in Dedovichsky District; municipally, a part of Dubishenskaya Rural Settlement of that district
- Borok (Pozherevitskaya Rural Settlement), Dedovichsky District, Pskov Oblast, a village in Dedovichsky District; municipally, a part of Pozherevitskaya Rural Settlement of that district
- Borok (Sosonskaya Rural Settlement), Dedovichsky District, Pskov Oblast, a village in Dedovichsky District; municipally, a part of Sosonskaya Rural Settlement of that district
- Borok (Pukhnovskaya Rural Settlement), Kunyinsky District, Pskov Oblast, a village in Kunyinsky District; municipally, a part of Pukhnovskaya Rural Settlement of that district
- Borok (Botalovskaya Rural Settlement), Kunyinsky District, Pskov Oblast, a village in Kunyinsky District; municipally, a part of Botalovskaya Rural Settlement of that district
- Borok, Nevelsky District, Pskov Oblast, a village in Nevelsky District
- Borok, Pechorsky District, Pskov Oblast, a village in Pechorsky District
- Borok (Verkhnemostskaya Rural Settlement), Porkhovsky District, Pskov Oblast, a village in Porkhovsky District; municipally, a part of Verkhnemostskaya Rural Settlement of that district
- Borok (Krasnoarmeyskaya Rural Settlement), Porkhovsky District, Pskov Oblast, a village in Porkhovsky District; municipally, a part of Krasnoarmeyskaya Rural Settlement of that district
- Borok (Slavkovskaya Rural Settlement), Porkhovsky District, Pskov Oblast, a village in Porkhovsky District; municipally, a part of Slavkovskaya Rural Settlement of that district
- Borok (Pavskaya Rural Settlement), Porkhovsky District, Pskov Oblast, a village in Porkhovsky District; municipally, a part of Pavskaya Rural Settlement of that district
- Borok (Porechenskaya Rural Settlement), Velikoluksky District, Pskov Oblast, a village in Velikoluksky District; municipally, a part of Porechenskaya Rural Settlement of that district
- Borok (Peresleginskaya Rural Settlement), Velikoluksky District, Pskov Oblast, a village in Velikoluksky District; municipally, a part of Peresleginskaya Rural Settlement of that district
- Borok (Porechenskaya Rural Settlement), Velikoluksky District, Pskov Oblast, a village in Velikoluksky District; municipally, a part of Porechenskaya Rural Settlement of that district

== Ryazan Oblast ==
As of 2010, one rural locality in Ryazan Oblast bears this name:

- Borok, Ryazan Oblast, a selo under the administrative jurisdiction of the work settlement of Shilovo in Shilovsky District

== Smolensk Oblast ==
As of 2010, five rural localities in Smolensk Oblast bear this name:

- Borok, Demidovsky District, Smolensk Oblast, a village in Shapovskoye Rural Settlement of Demidovsky District
- Borok, Dukhovshchinsky District, Smolensk Oblast, a village in Beresnevskoye Rural Settlement of Dukhovshchinsky District
- Borok, Pochinkovsky District, Smolensk Oblast, a village in Shmakovskoye Rural Settlement of Pochinkovsky District
- Borok, Katynskoye Rural Settlement, Smolensky District, Smolensk Oblast, a village in Katynskoye Rural Settlement of Smolensky District
- Borok, Loinskoye Rural Settlement, Smolensky District, Smolensk Oblast, a village in Loinskoye Rural Settlement of Smolensky District

== Republic of Tatarstan ==
As of 2010, one rural locality in the Republic of Tatarstan bears this name:

- Borok, Republic of Tatarstan, a selo in Nizhnekamsky District

== Tver Oblast ==
As of 2010, eight rural localities in Tver Oblast bear this name:

- Borok, Andreapolsky District, Tver Oblast, a village in Andreapolsky District
- Borok, Belsky District, Tver Oblast, a village in Belsky District
- Borok, Bologovsky District, Tver Oblast, a village in Bologovsky District
- Borok, Molokovsky District, Tver Oblast, a village in Molokovsky District
- Borok, Nelidovsky District, Tver Oblast, a settlement in Nelidovsky District
- Borok, Sandovsky District, Tver Oblast, a village in Sandovsky District
- Borok, Toropetsky District, Tver Oblast, a village in Toropetsky District
- Borok, Zapadnodvinsky District, Tver Oblast, a village in Zapadnodvinsky District

== Udmurt Republic ==
As of 2010, one rural locality in the Udmurt Republic bears this name:

- Borok, Udmurt Republic, a settlement in Borkovsky Selsoviet of Kambarsky District

== Ulyanovsk Oblast ==
As of 2010, one rural locality in Ulyanovsk Oblast bears this name:

- Borok, Ulyanovsk Oblast, a settlement in Karsunsky Settlement Okrug of Karsunsky District

== Vladimir Oblast ==
As of 2010, two rural localities in Vladimir Oblast bear this name:

- Borok, Muromsky District, Vladimir Oblast, a village in Muromsky District
- Borok, Petushinsky District, Vladimir Oblast, a village in Petushinsky District

== Vologda Oblast ==
As of 2010, six rural localities in Vologda Oblast bear this name:

- Borok, Belozersky District, Vologda Oblast, a village in Paninsky Selsoviet of Belozersky District
- Borok, Cherepovetsky District, Vologda Oblast, a village in Yagnitsky Selsoviet of Cherepovetsky District
- Borok, Kirillovsky District, Vologda Oblast, a village in Ferapontovsky Selsoviet of Kirillovsky District
- Borok, Nikolsky District, Vologda Oblast, a settlement in Verkhnekemsky Selsoviet of Nikolsky District
- Borok, Tarnogsky District, Vologda Oblast, a village in Verkhnespassky Selsoviet of Tarnogsky District
- Borok, Vashkinsky District, Vologda Oblast, a village in Vasilyevsky Selsoviet of Vashkinsky District

== Voronezh Oblast ==
As of 2010, one rural locality in Voronezh Oblast bears this name:

- Borok, Voronezh Oblast, a khutor in Staronikolskoye Rural Settlement of Khokholsky District

== Yaroslavl Oblast ==
As of 2010, three rural localities in Yaroslavl Oblast bear this name:

- Borok, Myshkinsky District, Yaroslavl Oblast, a village in Okhotinsky Rural Okrug of Myshkinsky District
- Borok, Nekouzsky District, Yaroslavl Oblast, a settlement in Vereteysky Rural Okrug of Nekouzsky District
- Borok, Rybinsky District, Yaroslavl Oblast, a village in Nazarovsky Rural Okrug of Rybinsky District
