= Ostrovsky (inhabited locality) =

Name of several Russian rural localities

Ostrovsky or Ostrovskoy (Russian: Остро́вский or Островско́й; masculine), Ostrovskaya (Островская; feminine), or Ostrovskoye (Островское; neuter) is the name of several rural localities in Russia:

- Ostrovsky, Tambov Oblast, a settlement in Yekaterinovsky Selsoviet of Morshansky District of Tambov Oblast
- Ostrovsky, Tula Oblast, a settlement in Nikolskaya Rural Administration of Shchyokinsky District of Tula Oblast
- Ostrovskoy, a khutor in Nizhneosinovsky Selsoviet of Surovikinsky District of Volgograd Oblast
- Ostrovskoye, Kaliningrad Oblast, a settlement in Ozerkovsky Rural Okrug of Gvardeysky District of Kaliningrad Oblast
- Ostrovskoye, Klevantsovskoye Settlement, Ostrovsky District, Kostroma Oblast, a railway station in Klevantsovskoye Settlement of Ostrovsky District of Kostroma Oblast
- Ostrovskoye, Ostrovskoye (tsentralnoye) Settlement, Ostrovsky District, Kostroma Oblast, a settlement in Ostrovskoye (tsentralnoye) Settlement of Ostrovsky District of Kostroma Oblast
- Ostrovskoye, Nizhny Novgorod Oblast, a selo in Ananyevsky Selsoviet of Knyagininsky District of Nizhny Novgorod Oblast
- Ostrovskaya, Volgograd Oblast, a stanitsa in Ostrovskoy Selsoviet of Danilovsky District of Volgograd Oblast
- Ostrovskaya, Kirillovsky District, Vologda Oblast, a village in Kovarzinsky Selsoviet of Kirillovsky District of Vologda Oblast
- Ostrovskaya, Verkhovazhsky District, Vologda Oblast, a village in Morozovsky Selsoviet of Verkhovazhsky District of Vologda Oblast
