= Ababkovo =

Ababkovo (Russian: Абабково) is the name of several rural localities in Russia:

- Ababkovo, Ivanovo Oblast, a village in Sunzha Settlement of Vichugsky District of Ivanovo Oblast; 57°23′30″N 41°43′14″E
- Ababkovo, Galichsky District, Kostroma Oblast, a village in Dmitriyevskoye Settlement of Galichsky District in Kostroma Oblast; 58°21′38″N 42°12′55″E
- Ababkovo, Kostromskoy District, Kostroma Oblast, a village in Kuznetsovskoye Settlement of Kostromskoy District in Kostroma Oblast; 57°59′48″N 41°05′12″E
- Ababkovo, Manturovsky District, Kostroma Oblast, a village in Oktyabrskoye Settlement of Manturovsky District in Kostroma Oblast; 58°22′13″N 44°43′32″E
- Ababkovo, Mezhevskoy District, Kostroma Oblast, a village in Georgiyevskoye Settlement of Mezhevskoy District in Kostroma Oblast; 58°41′23″N 44°56′53″E
- Ababkovo, Nizhny Novgorod Oblast, a selo in Ababkovsky Selsoviet of Pavlovsky District in Nizhny Novgorod Oblast; 56°01′38″N 43°09′23″E
- Ababkovo, Tver Oblast, a village in Pryamukhinskoye Rural Settlement of Kuvshinovsky District in Tver Oblast; 57°3′43″N 34°26′27″E
