= Antropovo =

Antropovo (Russian: Антропово) is the name of several rural localities in Russia:

- Antropovo, Ivanovo Oblast, a village in Zavolzhsky District of Ivanovo Oblast
- Antropovo, Kirov Oblast, a village in Bezvodninsky Rural Okrug of Pizhansky District of Kirov Oblast
- Antropovo, Antropovsky District, Kostroma Oblast, a settlement in Antropovskoye Settlement of Antropovsky District of Kostroma Oblast
- Antropovo, Parfenyevsky District, Kostroma Oblast, a village in Nikolo-Polomskoye Settlement of Parfenyevsky District of Kostroma Oblast
- Antropovo, Krasnoyarsk Krai, a selo in Glyadensky Selsoviet of Nazarovsky District of Krasnoyarsk Krai
- Antropovo, Moscow Oblast, a village in Lyubuchanskoye Rural Settlement of Chekhovsky District of Moscow Oblast
- Antropovo, Nevelsky District, Pskov Oblast, a village in Nevelsky District, Pskov Oblast
- Antropovo, Usvyatsky District, Pskov Oblast, a village in Usvyatsky District, Pskov Oblast
- Antropovo, Tyumen Oblast, a selo in Andryushinsky Rural Okrug of Nizhnetavdinsky District of Tyumen Oblast
- Antropovo, Vologda Oblast, a village in Ostrovsky Selsoviet of Vashkinsky District of Vologda Oblast
