= Borovsky, Russia =

Borovsky or Borovskoy (Russian: Боровский or Боровской; masculine), Borovskaya (Боровская; feminine), or Borovskoye (Боровское; neuter) is the name of several inhabited localities in Russia.

== Altai Krai ==
As of 2010, one rural locality in Altai Krai bears this name:

- Borovskoye, Altai Krai, a selo in Borovskoy Selsoviet of Aleysky District

== Arkhangelsk Oblast ==
As of 2010, two rural localities in Arkhangelsk Oblast bear this name:

- Borovskaya, Nyandomsky District, Arkhangelsk Oblast, a village in Moshinsky Selsoviet of Nyandomsky District
- Borovskaya, Shenkursky District, Arkhangelsk Oblast, a village in Mikhaylovsky Selsoviet of Shenkursky District

== Belgorod Oblast ==
As of 2010, one rural locality in Belgorod Oblast bears this name:

- Borovskoye, Belgorod Oblast, a selo in Shebekinsky District

== Irkutsk Oblast ==
As of 2010, one rural locality in Irkutsk Oblast bears this name:

- Borovskoy, Irkutsk Oblast, a settlement in Bratsky District

== Kirov Oblast ==
As of 2010, one rural locality in Kirov Oblast bears this name:

- Borovskaya, Kirov Oblast, a village in Luzyansky Rural Okrug of Darovskoy District

== Komi Republic ==
As of 2010, one rural locality in the Komi Republic bears this name:

- Borovskaya, Komi Republic, a village in Zamezhnaya selo Administrative Territory of Ust-Tsilemsky District

== Kostroma Oblast ==
As of 2010, three rural localities in Kostroma Oblast bear this name:

- Borovskoy, Pyshchugsky District, Kostroma Oblast, a settlement in Golovinskoye Settlement of Pyshchugsky District
- Borovskoy, Sharyinsky District, Kostroma Oblast, a settlement in Shangskoye Settlement of Sharyinsky District
- Borovskoye, Kostroma Oblast, a village in Orekhovskoye Settlement of Galichsky District

== Kurgan Oblast ==
As of 2010, two rural localities in Kurgan Oblast bear this name:

- Borovskoye, Belozersky District, Kurgan Oblast, a selo in Borovskoy Selsoviet of Belozersky District
- Borovskoye, Kataysky District, Kurgan Oblast, a selo in Borovskoy Selsoviet of Kataysky District

== Lipetsk Oblast ==
As of 2010, one rural locality in Lipetsk Oblast bears this name:

- Borovskoye, Lipetsk Oblast, a selo in Tikhvinsky Selsoviet of Dobrinsky District

== Nizhny Novgorod Oblast ==
As of 2010, one rural locality in Nizhny Novgorod Oblast bears this name:

- Borovsky, Nizhny Novgorod Oblast, a cordon in Chashchikhinsky Selsoviet of Krasnobakovsky District

== Novgorod Oblast ==
As of 2010, one rural locality in Novgorod Oblast bears this name:

- Borovskoye, Novgorod Oblast, a village in Borovskoye Settlement of Khvoyninsky District

== Orenburg Oblast ==
As of 2010, one rural locality in Orenburg Oblast bears this name:

- Borovsky, Orenburg Oblast, a settlement in Troitsky Selsoviet of Buzuluksky District

== Smolensk Oblast ==
As of 2010, one rural locality in Smolensk Oblast bears this name:

- Borovskoye, Smolensk Oblast, a village in Leninskoye Rural Settlement of Pochinkovsky District

== Sverdlovsk Oblast ==
As of 2010, two rural localities in Sverdlovsk Oblast bear this name:

- Borovskoy, Artyomovsky District, Sverdlovsk Oblast, a settlement in Artyomovsky District
- Borovskoy, Talitsky District, Sverdlovsk Oblast, a settlement in Talitsky District

== Tver Oblast ==
As of 2010, two rural localities in Tver Oblast bear this name:

- Borovskoye, Maksatikhinsky District, Tver Oblast, a village in Maksatikhinsky District
- Borovskoye, Sandovsky District, Tver Oblast, a village in Sandovsky District

== Tyumen Oblast ==
As of 2010, one urban locality in Tyumen Oblast bears this name:

- Borovsky, Tyumen Oblast, a work settlement in Borovsky Rural Okrug of Tyumensky District

== Vologda Oblast ==
As of 2010, one rural locality in Vologda Oblast bears this name:

- Borovskaya, Vologda Oblast, a village in Olyushinsky Selsoviet of Verkhovazhsky District
