= Antropovsky =

Antropovsky (masculine), Antropovskaya (feminine), or Antropovskoye (neuter) may refer to:

- Antropovsky District, a district of Kostroma Oblast, Russia
- Antropovsky (rural locality) (Antropovskaya, Antropovskoye), name of several rural localities in Russia
