= Barauskas =

- Lithuanian surname
- m.: Barauskas
- f.: (unmarried): Barauskaitė
- f.: (married): Barauskienė
- Related names: Borowski, Borovsky, Borovský

Barauskas is a Lithuanian surname.

- Dominykas Barauskas, Lithuanian footballer
- Giedrė Barauskaitė, Lithuanian-born singer-songwriter comedian based in France
