= Borovsky =

Borovsky or Borovskoy (masculine), Borovskaya (feminine), or Borovskoye (neuter) may refer to:

== People ==
- Alexander Borovsky (1889–1968), Russian-American pianist
- Alexander Borovsky (art historian) (born 1952), Curator of Contemporary Art at the Russian Museum, Saint Petersburg
- Boris Borovsky (1939–2021), Russian tennis player and sports journalist
- Eugene Znosko-Borovsky (1884–1954), Russian chess master
- Karel Havlíček Borovský (1821–1856) Czech author and influential journalist
- Piotr (Fokich) Borovsky (1863–1932), Russian military surgeon
- Natasha Borovsky (1924–2012), Russian/Polish-American poet and novelist
- Sergei Borovsky (born 1956), association football player
- Jonathan Borofsky (born 1942), American artist who lives and works in Maine
- Nathan "Nate" D. Borofsky, vocalist, baritone guitarist, bass guitarist of Girlyman

== Geography ==
- Borovsky District, a district of Kaluga Oblast, Russia
- Borovsky, Russia (Borovskoy, Borovskaya, Borovskoye), name of several inhabited localities in Russia
- Borovskoy, Kazakhstan, a village and the administrative center of Mendykara District of Kostanay Province, Kazakhstan
- Borovskoy, Sharyinsky District, Kostroma Oblast

== See also ==
- Borovský, Czech/Slovak form
- Borowski/Borowsky, Polish form
