= Zapadnyy (village) =

Zapadnyy Западный
- Village
- Location within Kostroma Oblast Location within Russia
- Coordinates: 57.872778°N 41.670278°E
- Country: Russia
- Region: Kostroma Oblast
- District: Sudislavsky District

Population (2014)
  - Total: 519
- Time zone: UTC+03:00

Zapadnyy (Russian: За́падный) is a rural locality (a village) in Sudislavskoye Rural Settlement of Sudislavsky District, Kostroma Oblast, Russia. The population was 519 as of 2014. There are 9 streets.

== History ==
The village received this name in 1966.

== Geography ==
Zapadnyy is located 3 km southwest of Sudislavl (the district's administrative centre) by road. Sudislavl is the nearest rural locality.
