= Valery Troitskaya =

Russian geophysicist (1917–2010)

Valeria Troitskaya
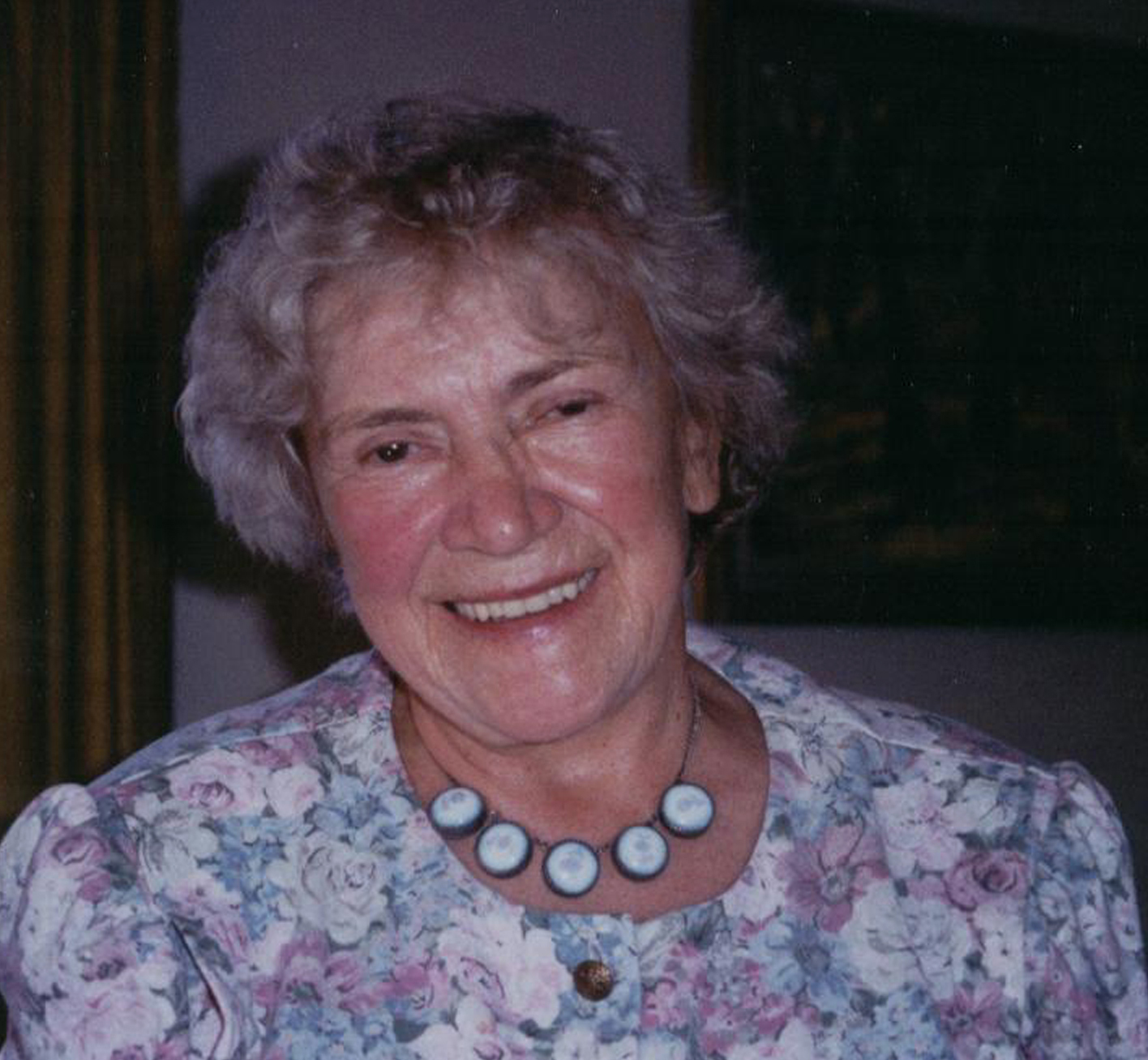
- Born: 15 November 1917; Petrograd, Russia
- Died: 22 January 2010 (aged 92); Melbourne, Australia
- Citizenship: Russian, Australian
- Education: Leningrad State University
- Known for: Work on Ultra Low Frequency (ULF) waves
- Scientific career
- Fields: Geophysics

Valeria Troitskaya (15 November 1917 – 22 January 2010) was a Russian geophysicist who is known for her work on Ultra Low Frequency (ULF) waves.

== Early life ==
Troitskaya was born in Petrograd (today known as St. Petersburg) on November 15, 1917, during the Soviet suppression. Even when young, her gifts were exceptional. She excelled in music (piano) and sports and became fluent in French and German in addition to her native Russian. Later she learned English. Her mastery of many languages gave her easy access to world communications. She was always well read in the popular literature of many countries as well as their scientific literature.

In 1937 at a time of intense political persecution referred to as the Great Purge, her father was arrested by the Soviet secret police (KGB). Twenty-year-old Valeria managed to send a telegram to the dreaded Beria who was directing the ruthless extermination of large numbers of “enemies of the people”. Remarkably, her pleas on her father's behalf were successful in obtaining his release in three years. In 2000 she provided an account of her negotiations (Telegram to Beria) in the Russian literary magazine Neva.

In 1940, at age 23, Valeria graduated from Leningrad State University with a Masters in Geophysics, and spent the next four war years in Kazan, the capital of Tatarstan, teaching German to Soviet officers. She returned to Leningrad and married Alexander Waisenberg, a well-known nuclear physicist. Twins Katia and Peter were born to the young couple in 1946 and the following year the family moved to Moscow.

== Career ==
In 1950, Valeria became a graduate student at the Institute of Physics of the Earth in Moscow. In 1953 she obtained her Ph.D. specializing in the study of geomagnetic micropulsations (magnetic pulsations in current parlance)—naturally occurring Ultra Low Frequency (ULF) sinusoidal variations of the geomagnetic field with periods of about one second to ten minutes as recorded on special magnetograms. She remained at the Institute of the Physics of the Earth until 1989, serving as chairman of the Electromagnetics Department for the last 27 years.

Recognizing the importance of understanding the spatial and temporal properties of ULF waves, Valeria advocated the installation of magnetic observatories in Russia and in other countries. She established magnetic observatories all over Russia, with a particularly notable one at the research community in the village of Borok, located halfway between Leningrad and Moscow. She developed joint research programs with Germany, Finland, England, the United States, Japan, Hungary, India, Cuba, Czechoslovakia and Australia. Especially with France she developed a program studying activity at geomagnetic conjugate points in the southern and northern hemispheres. In order to gain international support for her area of research and to facilitate communication between Soviet scientists and their colleagues elsewhere, she was active in many international scientific organizations including IAGA (International Association for Geodesy and Aeronomy) and COSPAR (Committee on Space Research). Through these activities and her scientific connections, she developed many close friendships. She maintained many of these friendships through correspondence until the time of her death.

The author of more than 300 scientific articles, Valeria received many awards at home and abroad. She was a Foreign Member of the Finnish Academy of Science and Letters and the Academia Leopoldina of Germany. The Royal Astronomical Society of London conferred on her the prestigious award of Associate. She was elected Honorary Member of the International Union of Geodesy and Geophysics and served as member of its Bureau. She was the first woman to be elected President of the International Union of Geomagnetism and Aeronomy. After moving to Australia in 1989, she became an Honorary Professor of the Department of Physics at La Trobe University. She was on the Steering Committee of the International Geosphere-Biosphere Program from its start until September 1990.

In the early days of the space age, after extensively studying magnetograms from all over the world, Valeria developed a system of names for different types of magnetic pulsations, identifying them as either continuous (Pc's), or irregular (Pi's). She introduced colorful language (such as “pearls”) to characterize the appearance of some of these waves on magnetic records. Among Valeria's notable publications is a paper that formally established this nomenclature for types of ULF waves and influenced permanently the way magnetic pulsations are analyzed. In another key paper, Valeria proposed that power in waves of 10s of second period observed on the surface of the earth could be used to infer the magnitude of the interplanetary magnetic field in the solar wind upstream of Earth's magnetosphere. This bold insight was confirmed by later work.

In 1996, a special session was held at the spring meeting of the American Geophysical Union to honor her in anticipation of her 80th birthday. Organized by Margaret Kivelson and David Southwood, the symposium entitled “ULF Waves: A Tribute to Valeria Troitskaya” brought together colleagues from many countries who paid tribute to their beloved and much appreciated Mme. Troitskaya and described how her work on magnetic pulsations had provided the basis for major advances in understanding the magnetosphere and its dynamics.

== Later life ==
Valeria's first husband Alexander Waisenberg died in 1985. In 1989 she married the well-known scientist Keith Cole. Keith also had been President of IAGA and was professor at La Trobe University in Melbourne, Australia. Keith and Valeria traveled and worked together in many parts of the world, including extensive stays at NASA's Goddard Space Flight Center. Eventually they settled in Melbourne.

Valeria Troitskaya died in Melbourne, Australia, on January 22, 2010, at age 92.
