= Borowski =

Borowski (Polish pronunciation: [bɔˈrɔfskʲi]; feminine: Borowska; plural: Borowscy) is a surname of Polish-language origin.

Language	Masculine	Feminine
Polish	Borowski	Borowska
Belarusian (Romanization)	Бароўскі (Baroŭski)	Бароўская (Baroŭskaja, Barouskaya)
Lithuanian	Barauskas	Barauskienė (married); Barauskaitė (unmarried)
Russian (Romanization)	Боровский (Borovsky, Borovskiy, Borovskij)	Боровская (Borovskaya, Borovskaia, Borovskaja)
Ukrainian (Romanization)	Боровський (Borovskyi, Borovskyy, Borovskyj)	Боровська (Borovska)

== People ==
- Dorota Borowska (born 1996), Polish canoeist
- Edmund Borowski (1945–2022), Polish athlete
- Elie Borowski (1913–2003), Jewish art dealer and collector, founder of the Bible Lands Museum
- Felix Borowski (1872–1956), American composer
- Filip Borowski (born 2003), Polish footballer
- Henryk Borowski (1910–1991), Polish actor
- Izydor Borowski (c. 1770–1838), Polish-Iranian general
- Joe Borowski (1933–1996), Canadian politician
- Joe Borowski (born 1971), American sports broadcaster
- John Borowski, American filmmaker
- Jörn Borowski (born 1959), German sailor
- Marek Borowski (born 1946), Polish politician
- Paul Borowski (1937–2012), German sailor
- Tadeusz Borowski (1922–1951), Polish writer
- Tim Borowski (born 1980), German footballer
- Wacław Borowski (1885–1954), Polish painter
- Mae Borowski (born 1997), main character of Night in the Woods

== See also ==
- Borowski v Canada (AG)
- Minister of Justice v. Borowski
- Irvin J. Borowsky (born 1924), American publisher and philanthropist
- Borovsky (disambiguation)
