= Konteyevo =

Konteyevo (Russian: Контеево) is the name of several rural localities in Kostroma Oblast, Russia.

== Modern localities ==
- Konteyevo, Buysky District, Kostroma Oblast, a selo in Tsentralnoye Settlement of Buysky District; 58°26′N 41°24′E

== Abolished localities ==
- Konteyevo, Antropovsky District, Kostroma Oblast, a village in Antropovsky Selsoviet of Antropovsky District; abolished on December 27, 2004
