= Mirnyy (village) =

Mirnyy Мирный
- Village
- Location within Kostroma Oblast Location within Russia
- Coordinates: 57.896944°N 41.6375°E
- Country: Russia
- Region: Kostroma Oblast
- District: Sudislavsky District

Population (2014)
  - Total: 244
- Time zone: UTC+03:00

Mirnyy (Russian: Ми́рный) is a rural locality (a village) in Sudislavskoye Rural Settlement of Sudislavsky District, Kostroma Oblast, Russia. The population was 244 as of 2014. There are 7 streets.

== History ==
The village received this name in 1966.
