= Ultra low frequency =

Range 300-3000 Hz of the electromagnetic spectrum

- Frequency range: 0.3 to 3 kHz
- Wavelength range: 1,000 to 100 km

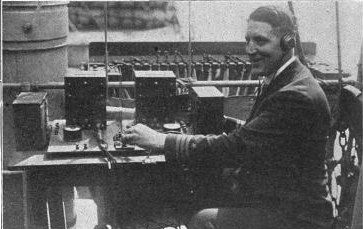
Listening to 500 Hz signal of Ambrose Channel pilot cable in 1920

Ultra low frequency (ULF) is the ITU designation for the frequency range of electromagnetic waves between 300 hertz and 3 kilohertz, corresponding to wavelengths between 1,000 and 100 km. In magnetosphere science and seismology, alternative definitions are usually given, including ranges from 1 mHz to 100 Hz, 1 mHz to 1 Hz, and 10 mHz to 10 Hz.

Many types of waves in the ULF frequency band can be observed in the magnetosphere and on the ground. These waves represent important physical processes in the near-Earth plasma environment. The speed of the ULF waves is often associated with the Alfvén velocity that depends on the ambient magnetic field and plasma mass density.

This band is used for communications in mines, as it can penetrate the earth.

== Earthquakes ==
Some monitoring stations have reported that earthquakes are sometimes preceded by a spike in ULF activity. A remarkable example of this phenomenon was believed to have occurred before the 1989 Loma Prieta earthquake in California based on data from a nearby sensor array. However, a subsequent study argued this 1989 event was little more than a sensor malfunction, as sensors from other locations did not identify the ULF spike reported from near the quake's epicenter.

On December 9, 2010, geoscientists announced that the DEMETER satellite observed a dramatic increase in ULF radio waves over Haiti in the month before the magnitude 7.0 M_{w} 2010 earthquake, and a gradual ebbing of the ULF waves in the month after the quake. Researchers are attempting to learn more about this correlation to find out whether this method can be used as part of an early warning system for earthquakes.

== Earth mode communications ==
Communications through the ground using conduction fields is known as "Earth-Mode" communications and was first used in World War I. This technology was explored for possible use in the mining industry from the 1920s.

ULF has been used by the military for secure communications through the ground. Publications associated with NATO's AGARD from the 1960s detailed many such systems, although it is possible that the published papers left unmentioned some information about what actually was developed secretly for defense purposes.

Radio amateurs and electronics hobbyists have used this mode for limited range communications using audio power amplifiers connected to widely spaced electrode pairs hammered into the soil. At the receiving end, the signal is detected as a weak electric current between a further pair of electrodes. Using weak signal reception methods with PC-based DSP filtering with extremely narrow bandwidths, it is possible to receive signals at a range of a few kilometers with a transmitting power of 10–100 W and electrode spacing of around 10–50 m.

== See also ==
- Extremely low frequency
- Earth's field NMR
- Valery Troitskaya
- Through-the-earth mine communications
- Voice frequency

== External articles ==
- Tomislav Stimac, "Definition of frequency bands (VLF, ELF... etc.)". IK1QFK Home Page (vlf.it).
- NASA live streaming ELF -> VLF Receiver
- Amateur Radio Below 10 kHz "G3XBM's page on Earth Mode Communication"
- Review of Earth Mode Communications "1966 abstract about Earth Mode Comms by Ames, Frazier and Orange"
- Radio communications within the Earth's crust "Abstract of article by Burrows written in 1963"
- OEAW, "'". ULF Waves -according to geophysical research community Homepage of OEAW, Austrian academy of science, Austria.
