= Bogovarovo =

Rural locality in Kostroma Oblast, Russia

Coordinates: 58°58′32″N 47°01′01″E

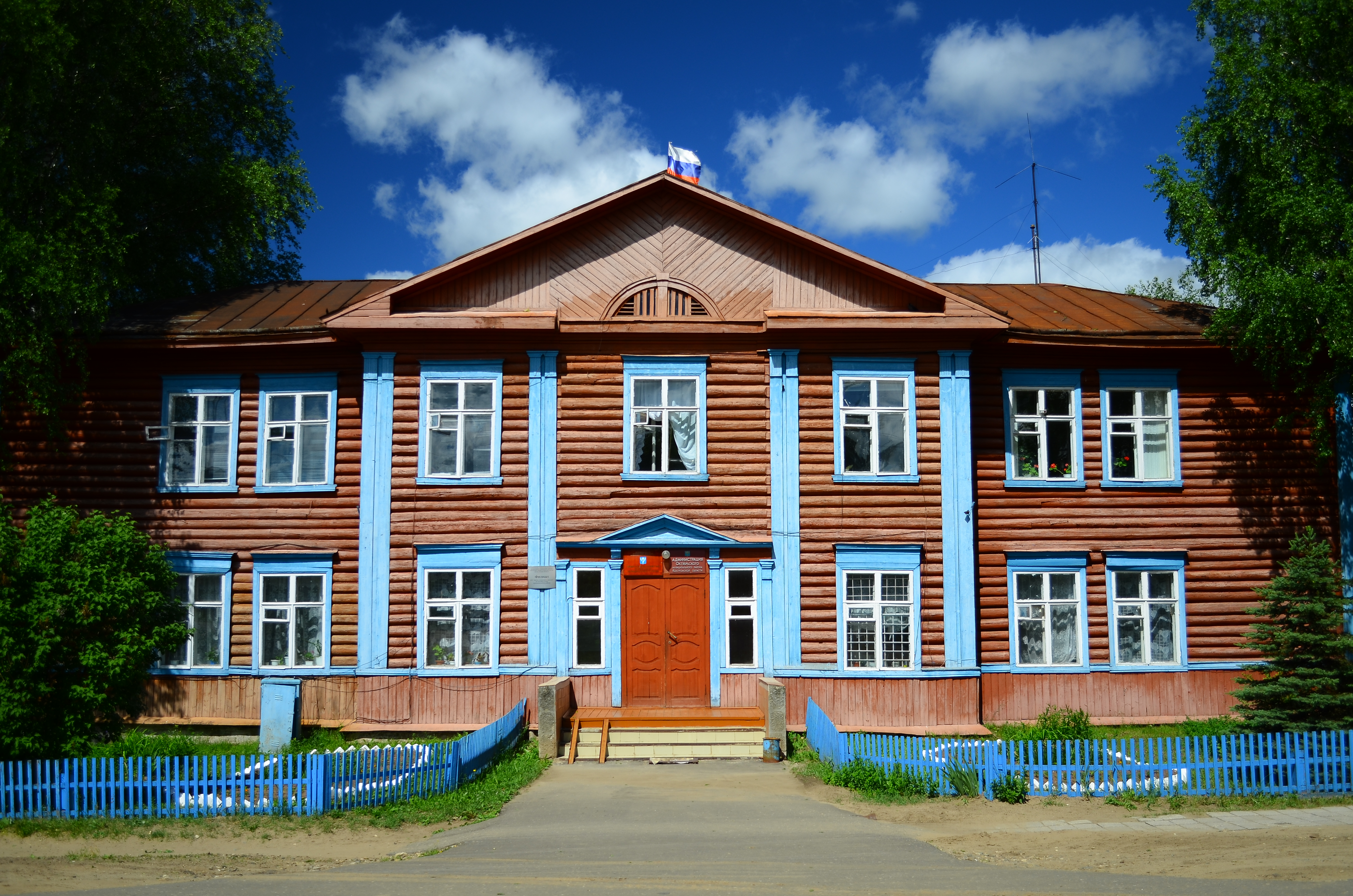
Administrational building in Bogovarovo

Bogovarovo (Russian: Богова́рово) is a rural locality (a selo) and the administrative center of Oktyabrsky District, Kostroma Oblast, Russia. Population: 2,229 (2010 census); 2,388 (2002 census); 2,640 (1989 Soviet census).
