= Georgiyevskoye, Mezhevskoy District, Kostroma Oblast =

Rural locality in Kostroma Oblast, Russia

Coordinates: 58°44′03″N 45°01′29″E

Georgiyevskoye (Russian: Гео́ргиевское) is a rural locality (a selo) and the administrative center of Mezhevskoy District, Kostroma Oblast, Russia. Population: 2,513 (2010 census); 2,816 (2002 census); 2,948 (1989 Soviet census).

== Paleontology ==
Fossil of temnospondyl amphibian Wetlugasaurus was found in Lower Triassic (Lower Olenekian) deposits of Georgiyevskoye.
