= Oktyabrsky District, Kostroma Oblast =

Oktyabrsky District Октябрьский район (Russian)
- District
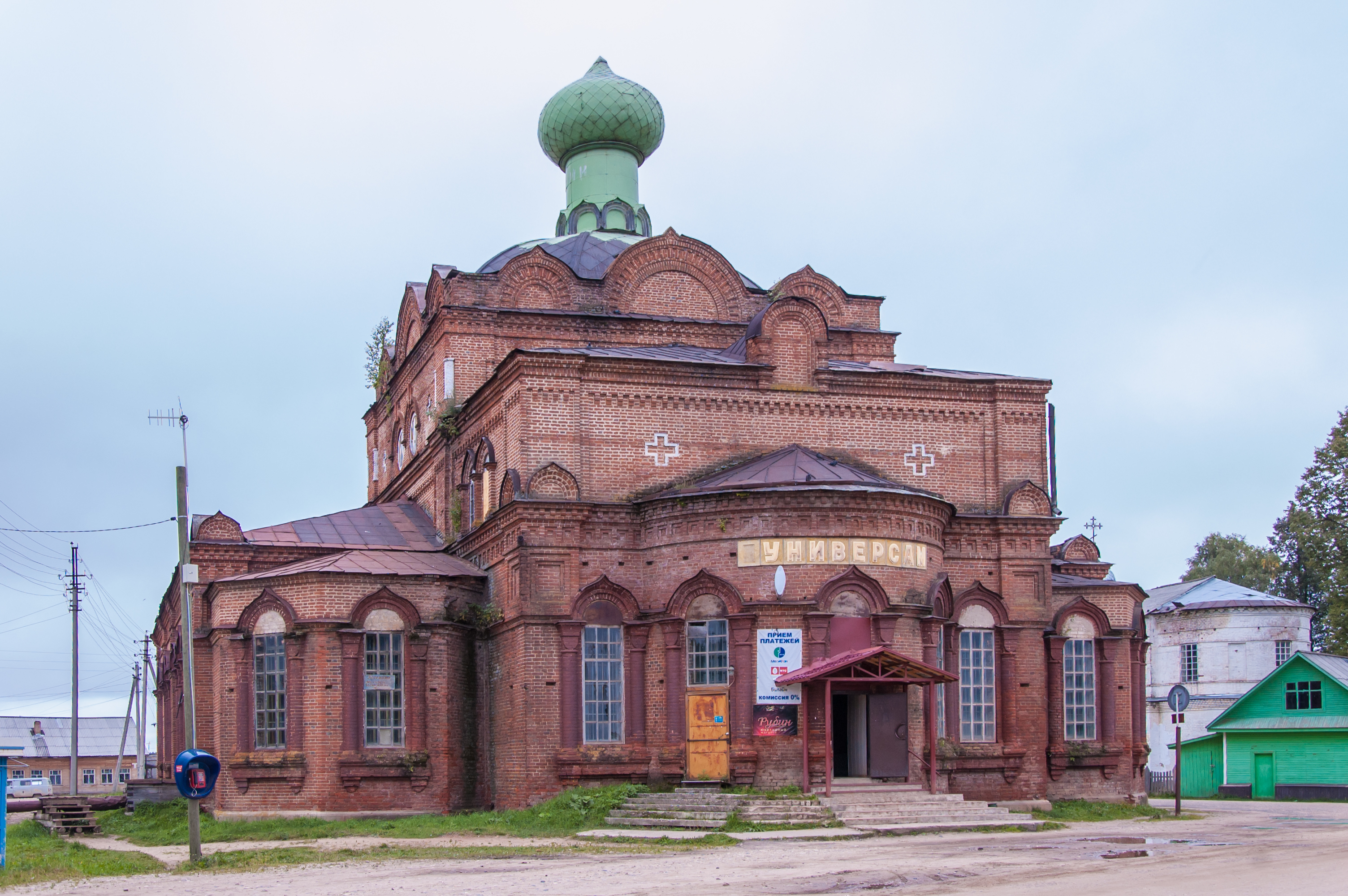
- Church in Bogovarovo, Oktyabrsky District

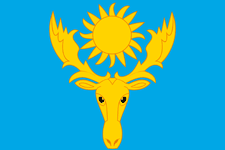
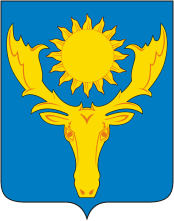
- Flag Coat of arms
- Location of Oktyabrsky District in Kostroma Oblast
- Coordinates: 58°58′35″N 47°01′14″E
- Country: Russia
- Federal subject: Kostroma Oblast
- Established: 1945
- Administrative center: Bogovarovo

Area
  - Total: 1,861 km^{2} (719 sq mi)

Population (2010 Census)
  - Total: 4,946
  - Density: 2.658/km^{2} (6.883/sq mi)
  - Urban: 0%
  - Rural: 100%

Administrative structure
  - Administrative divisions: 7 Settlements
  - Inhabited localities: 101 rural localities

Municipal structure
  - Municipally incorporated as: Oktyabrsky Municipal District
  - Municipal divisions: 0 urban settlements, 5 rural settlements
- Time zone: UTC+3 (MSK)
- OKTMO ID: 34628000
- Website: http://adm44.ru/area/mapobl/municipal/oktyabrskiy/index.aspx

Oktyabrsky District (Russian: Октя́брьский райо́н) is an administrative and municipal district (raion), one of the twenty-four in Kostroma Oblast, Russia. It is located in the east of the oblast. The area of the district is 1,861 square kilometers (719 sq mi). Its administrative center is the rural locality (a selo) of Bogovarovo. Population: 3,478 (2021 census); 4,946 (2010 census); 6,289 (2002 Census); 7,658 (1989 Soviet census). The population of Bogovarovo accounts for 45.1% of the district's total population.
