= Borok, Cherepovetsky District, Vologda Oblast =

Borok Борок
- Village
- Location within Vologda Oblast Location within Russia
- Coordinates: 58°32′N 37°32′E
- Country: Russia
- Region: Vologda Oblast
- District: Cherepovetsky District
- Time zone: UTC+3:00

Borok (Russian: Борок) is a rural locality (a village) in Yagnitskoye Rural Settlement, Cherepovetsky District, Vologda Oblast, Russia. The population was 109 as of 2002.

== Geography ==
Borok is located 128 km (80 mi) southwest of Cherepovets (the district's administrative centre) by road. Ploskovo is the nearest rural locality.
