= Borok, Ivanovo Oblast =

Borok Борок
- Village
- Location within Ivanovo Oblast Location within Russia
- Coordinates: 56°35′N 41°51′E
- Country: Russia
- Region: Ivanovo Oblast
- District: Yuzhsky District
- Time zone: UTC+3:00

Borok (Russian: Борок) is a rural locality (a selo) in Yuzhsky District, Ivanovo Oblast, Russia. Population: 49 (2010 census);

== Geography ==
This rural locality is located 9 kilometres (5.6 mi) from Yuzha (the district's administrative centre), 71 kilometres (44 mi) from Ivanovo (capital of Ivanovo Oblast) and 276 kilometres (171 mi) from Moscow. Kholuy is the nearest rural locality.
