= Ostrovskaya, Verkhovazhsky District, Vologda Oblast =

Ostrovskaya Островская
- Village
- Location within Vologda Oblast Location within Russia
- Coordinates: 60°44′N 41°35′E
- Country: Russia
- Region: Vologda Oblast
- District: Verkhovazhsky District
- Time zone: UTC+3:00

Ostrovskaya (Russian: Островская) is a rural locality (a village) in Morozovskoye Rural Settlement, Verkhovazhsky District, Vologda Oblast, Russia. The population was 8 as of 2002.

== Geography ==
Ostrovskaya is located 35 km west of Verkhovazhye (the district's administrative centre) by road. Bushnitskaya is the nearest rural locality.
