= Boris Borovsky =

Soviet journalist (1939–2021)

- Born: Boris Markovich Borovsky; 14 April 1939; Alma-Ata, Kazakh SSR, Soviet Union
- Died: 18 June 2021 (aged 82)
- Occupations: Television journalist, sport commentator, tennis expert

Boris Markovich Borovsky (Russian: Борис Маркович Боровский; 14 April 1939 – 18 June 2021) was a Russian tennis player and sports journalist; Master of Sports of the USSR; and member of the Russian Union of Journalists.

== Early life ==
Born in Alma-Ata, USSR and being interested in sports, Borovsky started playing tennis at school, taking part in competitions with Anna Dmitrieva.

In 1956, Borovsky won the first gold medal at the Spartakiad of the Peoples of the USSR, and two years later began to regularly represent the USSR's men's team.

== Career ==
Later Borovsky repeatedly was the winner of various national competitions, as well as participated in international tournaments.

Since the late 1950s, Borovsky began to try sports journalism: he prepared small materials and notes for the sports editors of various media and for some time collaborated with Radio in the Soviet Union.

In 1962 he graduated from the Moscow Technological Institute of Food Industry.

From 1966 to 1989 Borovsky worked on Radio Yunost, and later worked with the Radio Rossii (first as political commentator, and then as a sport). In 1998, Borovsky along with a group of colleagues organized the first sport radio station in the country and spent two years working on it.

In the mid of 1990s, Borovsky began to cooperate with the Russian-language version of the Eurosport TV channels (he is known as the first journalist, aired on Eurosport channels with the commentary in Russian) and shortly became one of lead tennis commentators on these channels. In the mid-2000s, Borovsky also worked for television broadcasts of tennis on Russia-2.

== Retirement and Death ==
Borovsky retired as commentator in 2018. He died on 18 June 2021 at the age of 82.

== Family ==
Borovsky had four children: Elena (1971), Vladimir and Fedor (both 1976), and Ivan (1989).
