= Borok, Nikolsky District, Vologda Oblast =

Borok Борок
- Settlement
- Location within Vologda Oblast Location within Russia
- Coordinates: 59°30′N 44°46′E
- Country: Russia
- Region: Vologda Oblast
- District: Nikolsky District
- Time zone: UTC+3:00

Borok (Russian: Борок) is a rural locality (a settlement) and the administrative center of Kemskoye Rural Settlement, Nikolsky District, Vologda Oblast, Russia. The population was 50 as of 2002. There are 15 streets.

== Geography ==
Borok is located 47 km west of Nikolsk (the district's administrative centre) by road. Demino is the nearest rural locality.
