= GiedRé =

Lithuanian-born French singer-songwriter

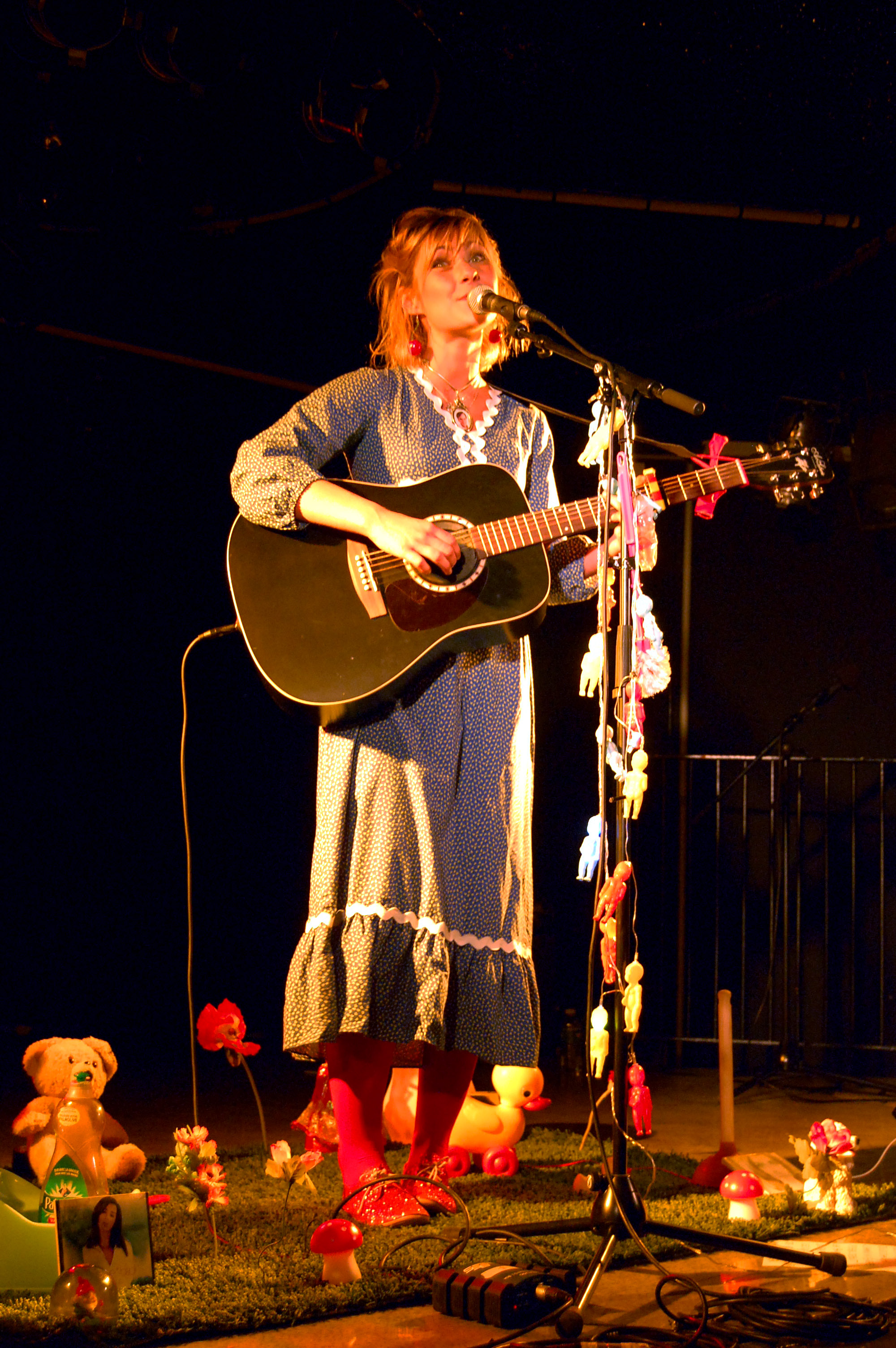
- GiedRé (2011)

Background information
- Born: Giedrė Barauskaitė; October 23, 1985 (age 40); Vilnius
- Origin: French singer of Lithuanian origin
- Genres: Humorous songs
- Occupations: Singer, songwriter, actress
- Years active: 2009–present
- Labels: Le rat des villes
- Website: www.giedre.fr

Giedrė Barauskaitė (born in Vilnius) better known by her stage mononym GiedRé or Giedré (pronounced /ɡje.dʁe/), is a Lithuanian-born singer-songwriter comedian based in France.

== Biography ==
Born in Lithuania, she moved with her mother to a Paris suburb after the death of her father when she was just seven.

After her baccalauréat, she studied drama at Cours Florent and ENSATT (École nationale supérieure des arts et techniques du théâtre) and appeared in small roles in television, theatre, and advertisements. She composed a few songs and started performing them in a local bar in the early 2000s. Noticed by Raphaël Mezrahi during an audition, she opened for him at a show of his in La Cigale. She was invited a number of times to the Europe 1 show C'est quoi ce bordel? presented by Laurent Baffie. Using the stage name Moisie, she opened to Baffie shows for a month and a half, followed by opening for comedian Oldelaf. In 2011, she had her debut independent album release and appeared in Les Francofolies de La Rochelle and FrancoFolies de Montréal, Les Francofolies de Spa in Belgium became a laureat of Fonds d'action et d'initiative rock (FAIR) in 2012. She engaged on a local tour with 100 dates in two years. Wearing colourful folkloric clothes, her repertoire is full of politically incorrect, black humour, and controversial taboo subjects.

== Discography ==
=== Albums ===
Year	Album	Peak positions	
Year	Album	FR	BEL (Wa)
2011	Mon premier disque	–	–
2012	Mon premier album genre Panninni	–	–
2013	MoN PReMieR BesT oF	129	67
2013	MoN PREMIER ALbuM VeNdu daNS LeS VRAIS MAGASINS	–	111
2013	MoN PREMIER ALbuM SoRTi au JaPoN	–	–
2014	MoN PReMieR aLBuM aVeC D'auTReS iNSTRuMeNTS Que JuSTe La GuiTaRe	–	–
2016	Lalala	–	–
2018	GiedRé Est Les Gens	–	–

=== Singles ===
Year	Single	Peak positions		Album
Year	Single	FR	BEL (Wa)	Album
2014	"Chut" (as Giedré)	86	–	MoN PReMieR aLBuM aVeC D'auTReS iNSTRuMeNTS Que JuSTe La GuiTaRe
2014	"Toutes des putes" (as Giedré)	129	–	MoN PReMieR aLBuM aVeC D'auTReS iNSTRuMeNTS Que JuSTe La GuiTaRe

== Filmography ==
- Best Intentions, 2018 film by Gilles Legrand
