= Borovskaya, Vologda Oblast =

Borovskaya Боровская
- Village
- Location within Vologda Oblast Location within Russia
- Coordinates: 60°35′N 41°25′E
- Country: Russia
- Region: Vologda Oblast
- District: Verkhovazhsky District
- Time zone: UTC+3:00

Borovskaya (Russian: Боровская) is a rural locality (a village) in Verkhovskoye Rural Settlement, Verkhovazhsky District, Vologda Oblast, Russia. The population was 18 as of 2002.

== Geography ==
Borovskaya is located 51 km southwest of Verkhovazhye (the district's administrative centre) by road. Yereminskoye is the nearest rural locality.
