= Kuznetsovo, Altai Krai =

Kuznetsovo Кузнецово
- Selo
- Location within Altai Krai Location within Russia
- Coordinates: 51°40′N 82°00′E
- Country: Russia
- Region: Altai Krai
- District: Kuryinsky District
- Time zone: UTC+7:00

Kuznetsovo (Russian: Кузнецово) is a rural locality (a selo) and the administrative center of Kuznetsovsky Selsoviet, Kuryinsky District, Altai Krai, Russia. The population was 577 as of 2013. There are 7 streets.

== Geography ==
Kuznetsovo is located 28 km northwest of Kurya (the district's administrative centre) by road. Krasnoznamenka is the nearest rural locality.
