= Kuznetsovo, Vladimir Oblast =

Kuznetsovo Кузнецово
- Village
- Location within Vladimir Oblast Location within Russia
- Coordinates: 56°06′N 40°01′E
- Country: Russia
- Region: Vladimir Oblast
- District: Sobinsky District
- Time zone: UTC+3:00

Kuznetsovo (Russian: Кузнецово) is a rural locality (a village) in Vorshinskoye Rural Settlement, Sobinsky District, Vladimir Oblast, Russia. The population was 6 as of 2010. There are 2 streets.

== Geography ==
Kuznetsovo is located 21 km north of Sobinka (the district's administrative centre) by road. Bakino is the nearest rural locality.
