= Borok, Petushinsky District, Vladimir Oblast =

Borok Борок
- Village
- Location within Vladimir Oblast Location within Russia
- Coordinates: 55°51′N 39°21′E
- Country: Russia
- Region: Vladimir Oblast
- District: Petushinsky District
- Time zone: UTC+3:00

Borok (Russian: Борок) is a rural locality (a village) in Petushinskoye Rural Settlement, Petushinsky District, Vladimir Oblast, Russia. The population was 10 as of 2010.

== Geography ==
Borok is located 16 km southwest of Petushki (the district's administrative centre) by road. Chashcha is the nearest rural locality.
