= Kuznetsovo, Vereshchaginsky District, Perm Krai =

Kuznetsovo Кузнецово
- Village
- Location within Perm Krai Location within Russia
- Coordinates: 58°05′N 54°17′E
- Country: Russia
- Region: Perm Krai
- District: Vereshchaginsky District
- Time zone: UTC+5:00

Kuznetsovo (Russian: Кузнецово) is a rural locality (a village) in Vereshchaginsky District, Perm Krai, Russia. The population was 48 as of 2010.

== Geography ==
Kuznetsovo is located 29 km west of Vereshchagino (the district's administrative centre) by road. Klyuchi is the nearest rural locality.
