= Kuznetsovo, Amur Oblast =

Kuznetsovo Кузнецово
- Selo
- Location within Amur Oblast Location within Russia
- Coordinates: 52°33′N 126°09′E
- Country: Russia
- Region: Amur Oblast
- District: Magdagachinsky District
- Time zone: UTC+9:00

Kuznetsovo (Russian: Кузнецово) is a rural locality (a selo) in Kuznetsovsky Selsoviet of Magdagachinsky District, Amur Oblast, Russia. The population was 189 as of 2018. There are 4 streets.

== Geography ==
Kuznetsovo is located on the left bank of the Amur River, 160 km south of Magdagachi (the district's administrative centre) by road.
