= Ostrovskaya, Volgograd Oblast =

Ostrovskaya Островская
- Stanitsa
- Location within Volgograd Oblast Location within Russia
- Coordinates: 50°26′N 44°26′E
- Country: Russia
- Region: Volgograd Oblast
- District: Danilovsky District
- Time zone: UTC+4:00

Ostrovskaya (Russian: Островская) is a rural locality (a stanitsa) and the administrative center of Ostrovskoye Rural Settlement, Danilovsky District, Volgograd Oblast, Russia. The population was 1,689 as of 2010. There are 26 streets.

== Geography ==
Ostrovskaya is located in forest steppe, 45 km northeast of Danilovka (the district's administrative centre) by road. Orekhovo is the nearest rural locality.
