= Ababkovo, Nizhny Novgorod Oblast =

Ababkovo Абабково
- Selo
- Location within Nizhny Novgorod Oblast Location within Russia
- Coordinates: 56.027222°N 43.156389°E
- Country: Russia
- Region: Nizhny Novgorod Oblast
- District: Pavlovsky District
- Time zone: UTC+3:00

Ababkovo (Russian: Аба́бково) is a rural locality (a selo), and the administrative center of Ababkovsky Selsoviet of Pavlovsky District, Russia.

== Population ==
The population was 1,181 as of 2010.

== Geography ==
Ababkovo is located 12 km northeast of Pavlovo (the district's administrative centre) by road. Medvezhye is the nearest rural locality.

== Streets ==
- Kolkhoznaya
- Molodyozhnaya
- Novaya Liniya
- Polevaya
- Stroiteley
- Tsentralnaya
- Shkolnaya
- Shkolnyy pereulok
