= Ostrovsky District, Kostroma Oblast =

Ostrovsky District Островский район (Russian)
- District
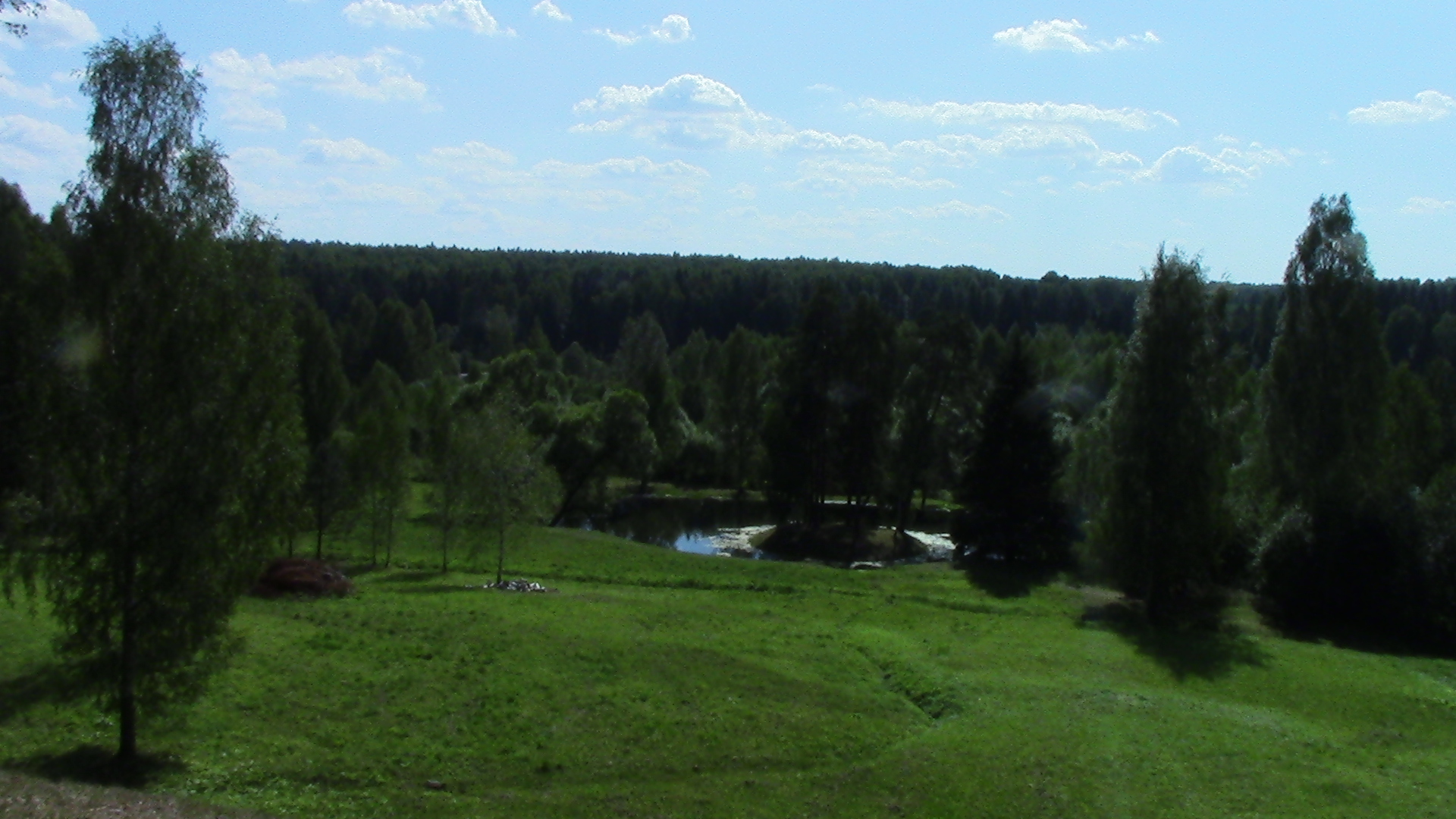
- Park Manor Shchelykovo the house-museum of Alexander Ostrovsky, Ostrovsky District

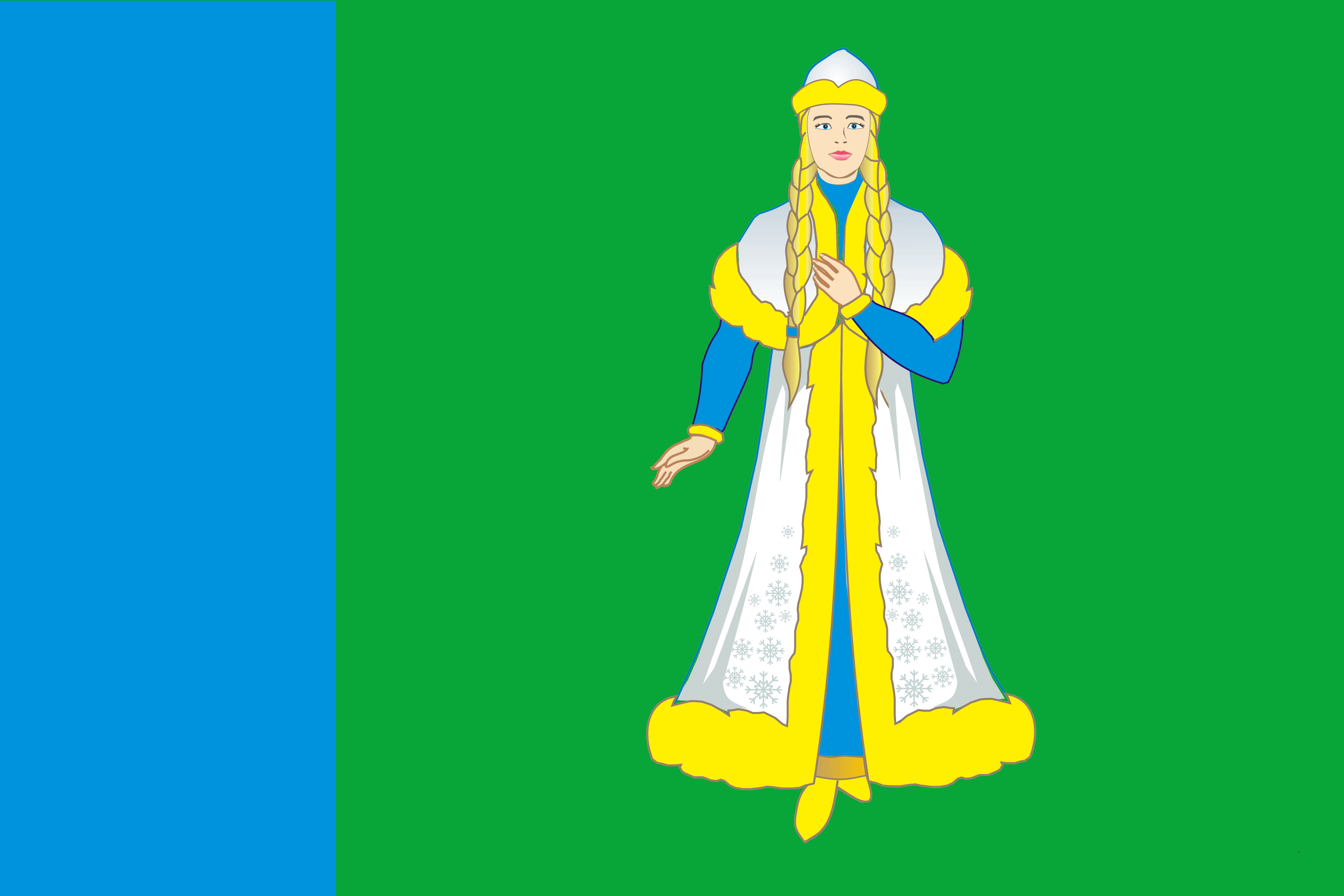
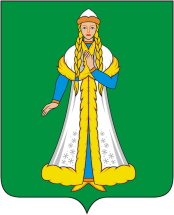
- Flag Coat of arms
- Location of Ostrovsky District in Kostroma Oblast
- Coordinates: 57°48′16″N 42°14′28″E
- Country: Russia
- Federal subject: Kostroma Oblast
- Established: 1929
- Administrative center: Ostrovskoye

Area
  - Total: 2,720 km^{2} (1,050 sq mi)

Population (2010 Census)
  - Total: 12,787
  - Density: 4.70/km^{2} (12.2/sq mi)
  - Urban: 0%
  - Rural: 100%

Administrative structure
  - Administrative divisions: 6 Settlements
  - Inhabited localities: 122 rural localities

Municipal structure
  - Municipally incorporated as: Ostrovsky Municipal District
  - Municipal divisions: 0 urban settlements, 6 rural settlements
- Time zone: UTC+3 (MSK)
- OKTMO ID: 34630000
- Website: http://www.ostrovskoe.ru/

Ostrovsky District (Russian: Остро́вский райо́н) is an administrative and municipal district (raion), one of the twenty-four in Kostroma Oblast, Russia. It is located in the southwest of the oblast. The area of the district is 2,720 square kilometers (1,050 sq mi). Its administrative center is the rural locality (a settlement of rural type) of Ostrovskoye. Population: 9,110 (2021 census); 12,787 (2010 census); 14,758 (2002 Census); 17,141 (1989 Soviet census). The population of Ostrovskoye accounts for 46.3% of the district's total population.

== Geography ==
Ostrovsky District is located in the southwest of Kostroma Oblast, about 10km north of the Volga River as it runs west to east. The terrain is flat or slightly hilly, with pine-larch forests (southern taiga) covering much of the district. The terrain is flat to slightly hilly, with a glacier-formed landscape of moraines, swamps, and lakes. The Mera River runs south to the Volga. Ostrovsky District is 50 km east of the regional city of Kostroma, and about 360 km northeast of Moscow. The area measures 65 km (north-south), and 55 km (west-east); total area is 2,446 km2 (about 4% of Kostroma Oblast). The administrative center is the town of Ostrovskkoye.

The district is bordered on the north by Galichsky District, on the east by Antropovsky District and Kadyysky District, on the south by Ivanovo Oblast, and on the west by Sudislavsky District.

== History ==
Ostrovsky District was originally named Semyonovsky District on its founding in 1929. At that time it was part of the Kineshma District of the Ivanovo Industrial Region. It was transferred to Kotroma Oblast in 1944, and renamed Ostrovsky District in 1948. The central town of Ostrovskoye was originally named Semenovskoe-Lapotnoe, with the new name being effected in 1956 to mark the 70th anniversary of the death of the playwright Alexander Ostrovsky.
