= Lugovoy (village) =

Lugovoy Луговой
- Village
- Location within Kostroma Oblast Location within Russia
- Coordinates: 58.478611°N 45.545556°E
- Country: Russia
- Region: Kostroma Oblast
- District: Sharyinsky District

Population (2014)
  - Total: 4
- Time zone: UTC+03:00

Lugovoy (Russian: Лугово́й) is a rural locality (a village) in Shangskoye Rural Settlement of Sharyinsky District, Kostroma Oblast, Russia. The population was 4 as of 2014.

== History ==
The village received this name in 1966.

== Geography ==
Lugovoy is located 15 km north of Sharya (the district's administrative centre) by road. Khmelevitsa is the nearest rural locality.
