= Kuznetsovo, Nikolsky District, Vologda Oblast =

Kuznetsovo Кузнецово
- Village
- Location within Vologda Oblast Location within Russia
- Coordinates: 59°42′N 45°23′E
- Country: Russia
- Region: Vologda Oblast
- District: Nikolsky District
- Time zone: UTC+3:00

Kuznetsovo (Russian: Кузнецово) is a rural locality (a village) in Terebayevskoye Rural Settlement, Nikolsky District, Vologda Oblast, Russia. The population was 78 as of 2002.

== Geography ==
Kuznetsovo is located 23 km north of Nikolsk (the district's administrative centre) by road. Guzhovo is the nearest rural locality.
