= Antropovsky (rural locality) =

Antropovsky (Russian: Антроповский; masculine), Antropovskaya (Антроповская; feminine), or Antropovskoye (Антроповское; neuter) is the name of several rural localities in Russia:

- Antropovskoye, a village in Ivnyakovsky Rural Okrug of Yaroslavsky District of Yaroslavl Oblast
- Antropovskaya, Plesetsky District, Arkhangelsk Oblast, a village in Fedovsky Selsoviet of Plesetsky District of Arkhangelsk Oblast
- Antropovskaya, Shenkursky District, Arkhangelsk Oblast, a village in Shegovarsky Selsoviet of Shenkursky District of Arkhangelsk Oblast
