= Sudislavl =

Sudislavl Судиславль
- Urban-type settlement
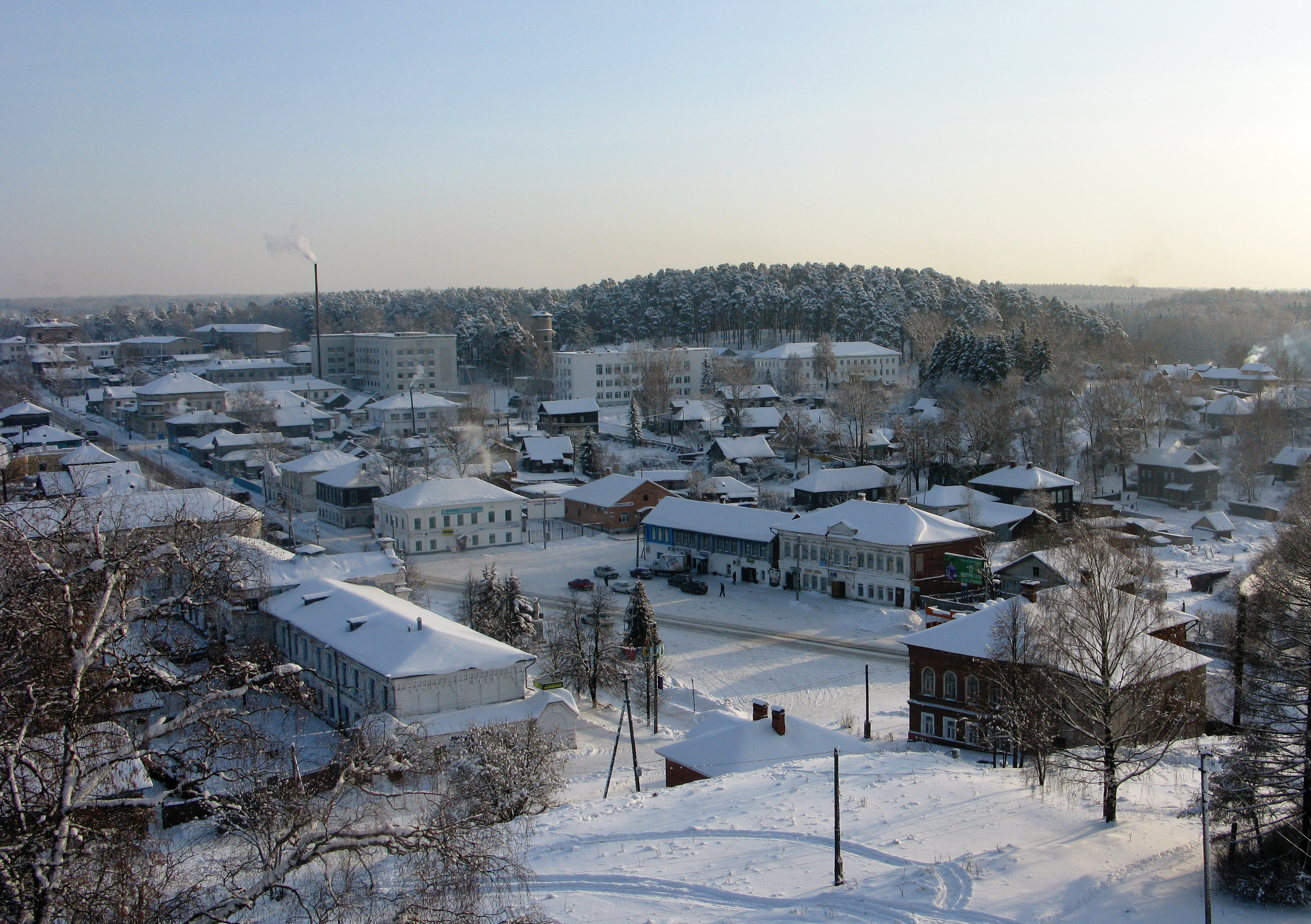
- Sudislavl in winter

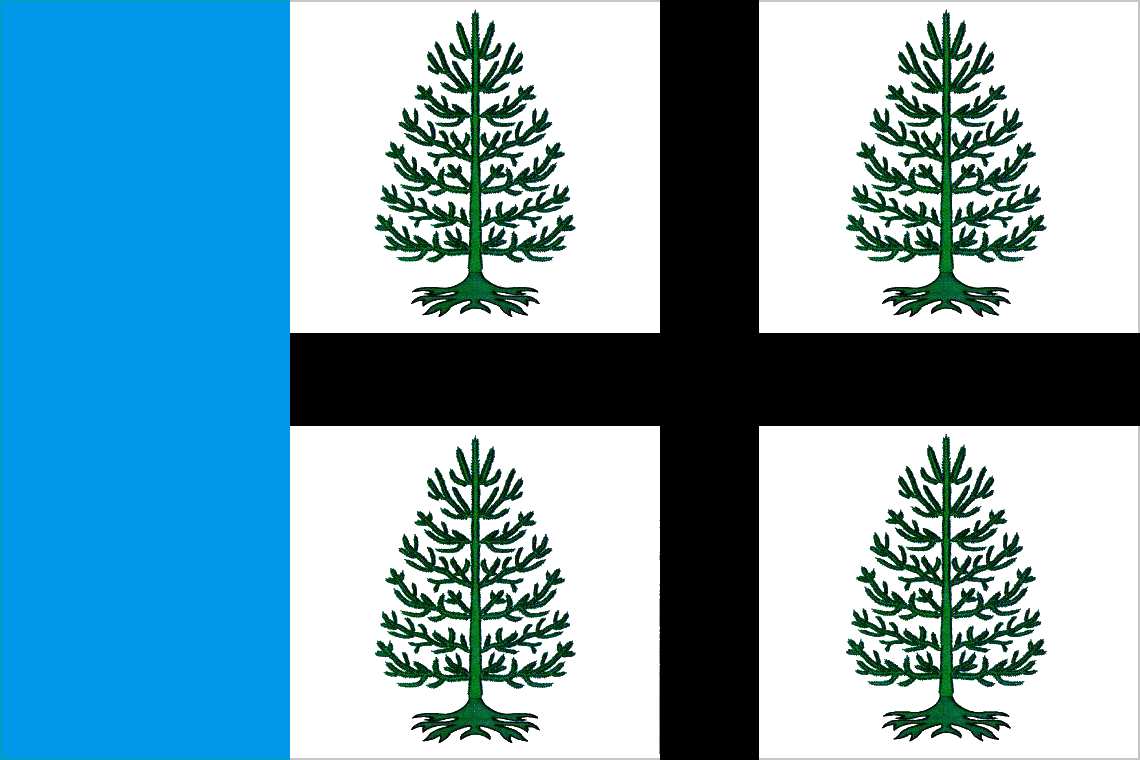
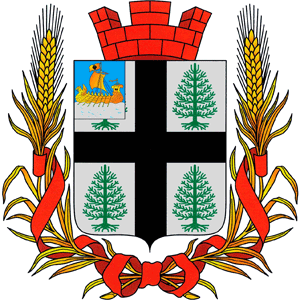
- Flag Coat of arms
- Interactive map of Sudislavl
- Location of Sudislavl Sudislavl (Kostroma Oblast)
- Coordinates: 57°53′N 41°42′E
- Country: Russia
- Federal subject: Kostroma Oblast
- Administrative district: Sudislavsky District
- Founded: 1360
- Urban-type settlement status since: 1963

Government
  - Body: Assembly of Deputies

Population (2010 Census)
  - Total: 4,913
  - Estimate (2025): 4,070 (−17.2%)

Administrative status
  - Capital of: Sudislavsky District
- Time zone: UTC+3 (MSK)
- Postal code: 157860
- Dialing code: +7 49433
- OKTMO ID: 34642151051

Sudislavl (Russian: Судисла́вль) is an urban locality (an urban-type settlement) and the administrative center of Sudislavsky District of Kostroma Oblast, Russia, situated 50 kilometers (31 mi) from Kostroma and 345 kilometers (214 mi) northeast of Moscow. Population: 4,158 (2021 census); 4,913 (2010 census); 5,373 (2002 census); 5,783 (1989 Soviet census).

== History ==
In the Middle Ages, Sudislavl was a town with its own timber kremlin. Ivan IV's testament from 1572 is the first document that mentions Sudislavl. A later chronicle from the local Resurrection monastery claims that Sudislavl existed as early as 1360.

In the 17th and 18th centuries Sudislavl was considered a "merchant town". The local merchants financed the construction of several stone churches which survive to this day. The Old Believers emerged as the dominant religious group in the district.

By the beginning of the 20th century, Sudislavl had entered a period of steady decline. It has not been ranked as a town since 1925.
