= Borok, Muromsky District, Vladimir Oblast =

Borok Борок
- Village
- Location within Vladimir Oblast Location within Russia
- Coordinates: 55°45′N 42°14′E
- Country: Russia
- Region: Vladimir Oblast
- District: Muromsky District
- Time zone: UTC+3:00

Borok (Russian: Боро́к) is a rural locality (a village) in Borisoglebskoye Rural Settlement, Muromsky District, Vladimir Oblast, Russia. The population was 24 as of 2010.

== Geography ==
Borok is located 48 km northeast of Murom (the district's administrative centre) by road. Poltso is the nearest rural locality.
