= Borovskoy, Irkutsk Oblast =

Borovskoy Боровской
- Village
- Location within Irkutsk Oblast Location within Russia
- Coordinates: 56°29′N 102°10′E
- Country: Russia
- Region: Irkutsk Oblast
- District: Bratsky District
- Time zone: UTC+8:00

Borovskoy (Russian: Боровской) is a rural locality (a settlement) in Bratsky District, Irkutsk Oblast, Russia. Population: 478 (2010 census);

== Geography ==
This rural locality is located 50 kilometres (31 mi) from Bratsk (the district's administrative centre), 485 kilometres (301 mi) from Irkutsk (capital of Irkutsk Oblast) and 3,964 kilometres (2,463 mi) from Moscow. Pashenny is the nearest rural locality.
