= Kuznetsovo, Velikoustyugsky District, Vologda Oblast =

Kuznetsovo Кузнецово
- Village
- Location within Vologda Oblast Location within Russia
- Coordinates: 60°45′N 46°23′E
- Country: Russia
- Region: Vologda Oblast
- District: Velikoustyugsky District
- Time zone: UTC+3:00

Kuznetsovo (Russian: Кузнецово) is a rural locality (a village) in Shemogodskoye Rural Settlement, Velikoustyugsky District, Vologda Oblast, Russia. The population was 54 as of 2002.

== Geography ==
The distance to Veliky Ustyug is 17 km, to Aristovo is 1 km. Verkhneye Pankratovo is the nearest rural locality.
