= Wacław Borowski =

Polish artist

Waclaw Borowski
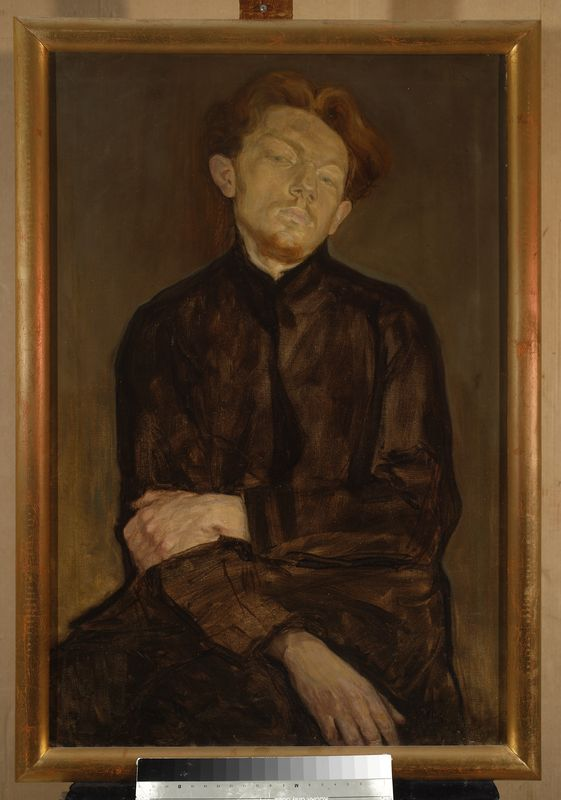
- Born: August 6, 1885; Łódź
- Died: April 9, 1954 (aged 68); Łódź
- Occupation: Polish artist

Wacław Borowski (August 6, 1885 – April 9, 1954) was a Polish painter and decorative artist. He was born and died in Łódź.

He studied painting at the Academy of Fine Arts in Kraków under Józef Mehoffer who was one of the leading artists of the Young Poland movement and one of the most revered Polish artists of his time. He spent the years of 1909–1913 in Paris copying works of the old masters at the Louvre. He later traveled to Italy to study the Renaissance masters in the place of its origin. In 1920 Borowski was a volunteer fighter for the Polish forces in the Polish-Bolshevik War. In 1926 he cofounded and was a vital part of Warsaw's artistic groups RYTM. He also competed in the art competitions at the 1932 Summer Olympics.

== Famous works ==
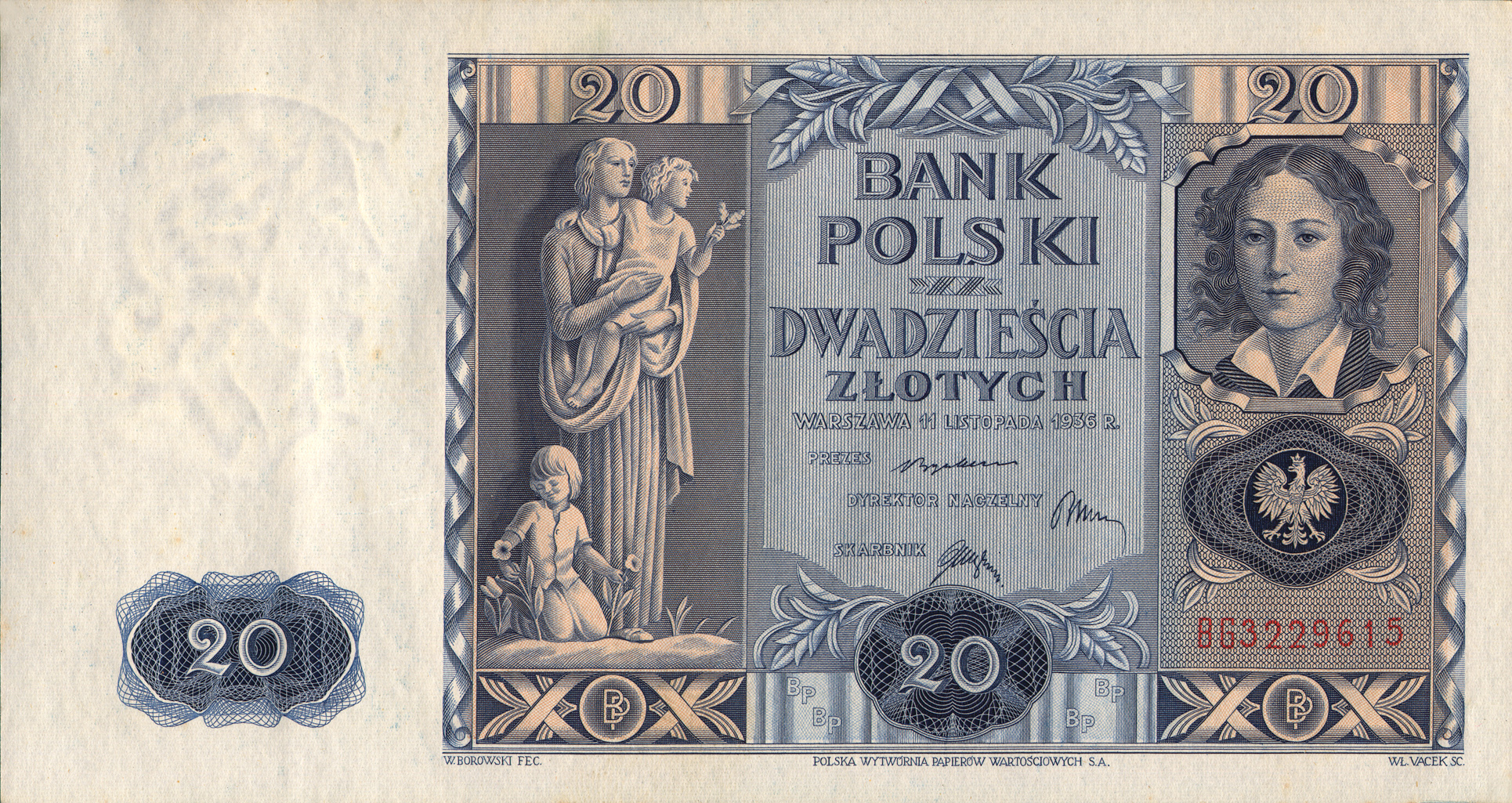
Polish 20 Polish złoty banknote, 1936 designed by Wacław Borowski

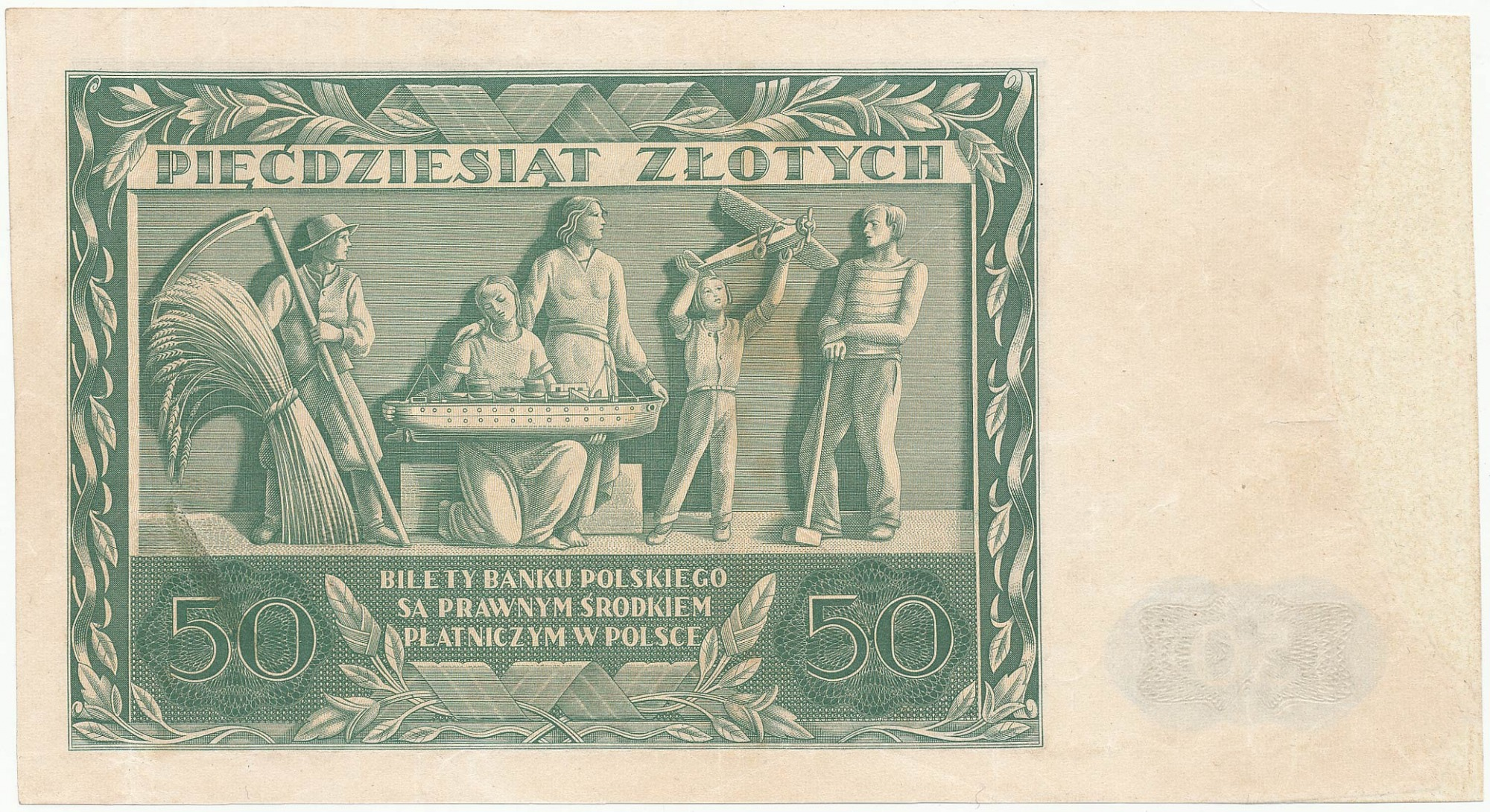
50 złotych, 1936

His best known paintings are:

- Diana (1929)
- Martwa natura z draperią (1930)
- Łuczniczka (1931)
- W pracowni (1932)
- W lesie (1932)
- Młodość (1932)
- Rybak (1938)

== See also ==
- List of Poles
