= Antropovo, Antropovsky District, Kostroma Oblast =

Rural locality in Russia

Antropovo Антропово
- settlement
- Interactive map of Antropovo
- Location of Antropovo Antropovo (Kostroma Oblast)
- Coordinates: 58°23′59″N 43°00′19″E
- Country: Russia
- Federal subject: Kostroma Oblast
- Administrative district: Antropovsky District
- SettlementSelsoviet: Antropovskoye Settlement
- Elevation: 188 m (617 ft)

Population (2010 Census)
  - Total: 3,598
  - Estimate (2021): 2,909 (−19.1%)

Administrative status
  - Capital of: Antropovsky District, Antropovskoye Settlement

Municipal status
  - Municipal district: Antropovsky Municipal District
  - Rural settlement: Antropovskoye Rural Settlement
  - Capital of: Antropovsky Municipal District, Antropovskoye Rural Settlement
- Time zone: UTC+3 (MSK)
- Postal code: 157290
- OKTMO ID: 34602403101

Antropovo (Russian: Антро́пово) is a rural locality (a settlement) and the administrative center of Antropovsky District of Kostroma Oblast, Russia. Population: 3,598 (2010 census); 3,834 (2002 census); 4,207 (1989 Soviet census).
