= Mezhevskoy District =

Mezhevskoy District Межевской район (Russian)
- District
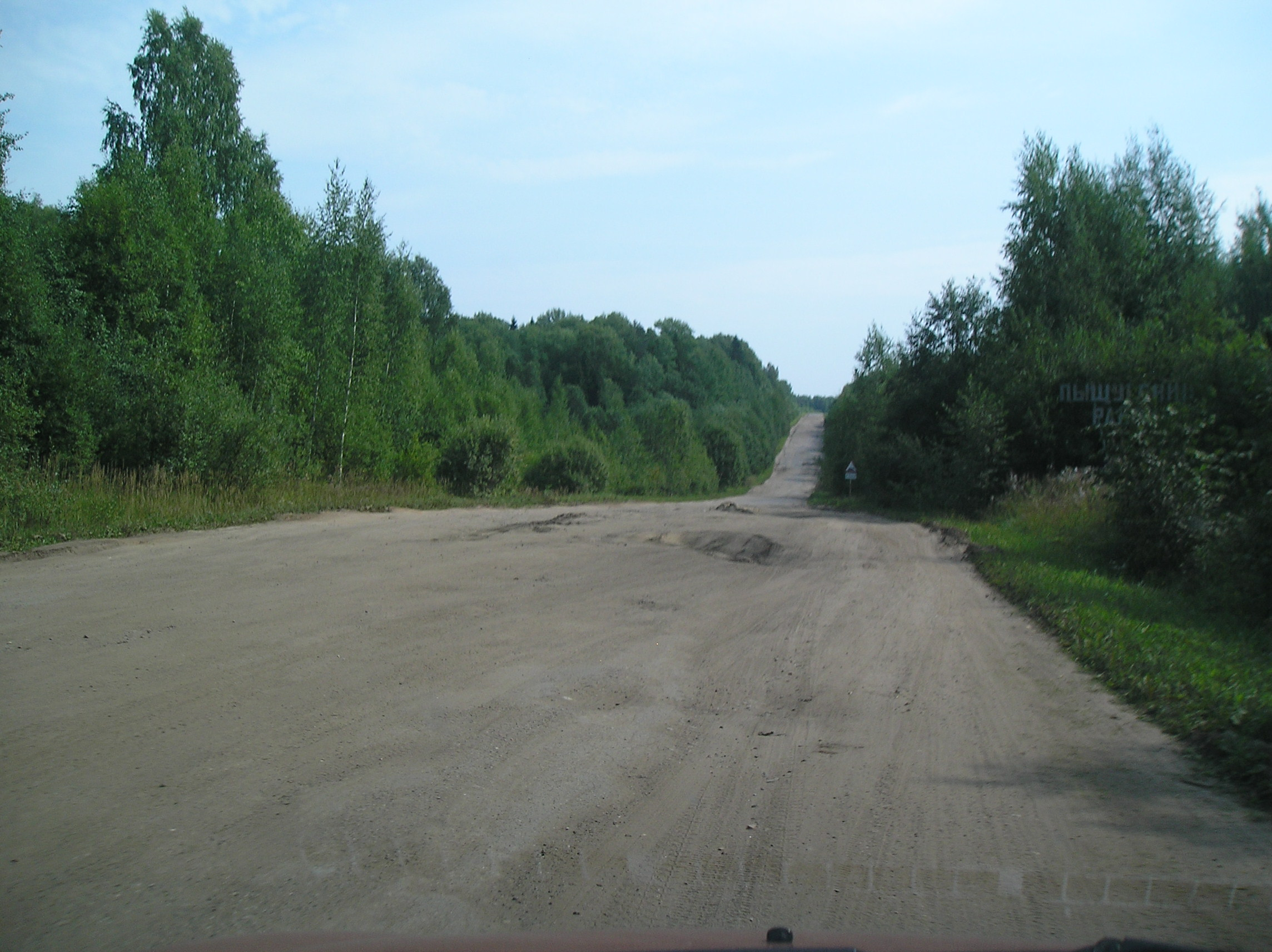
- Road through forest in Mezhevskoy District

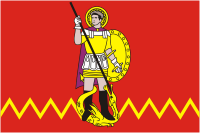
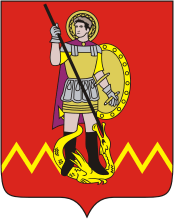
- Flag Coat of arms
- Location of Mezhevskoy District in Kostroma Oblast
- Coordinates: 58°43′59″N 45°01′22″E
- Country: Russia
- Federal subject: Kostroma Oblast
- Established: 1929
- Administrative center: Georgiyevskoye

Area
  - Total: 2,178 km^{2} (841 sq mi)

Population (2010 Census)
  - Total: 4,461
  - Density: 2.048/km^{2} (5.305/sq mi)
  - Urban: 0%
  - Rural: 100%

Administrative structure
  - Administrative divisions: 4 Settlements
  - Inhabited localities: 50 rural localities

Municipal structure
  - Municipally incorporated as: Mezhevskoy Municipal District
  - Municipal divisions: 0 urban settlements, 4 rural settlements
- Time zone: UTC+3 (MSK)
- OKTMO ID: 34622000
- Website: http://www.mezha.org/

Mezhevskoy District (Russian: Межевско́й райо́н) is an administrative and municipal district (raion), one of the twenty-four in Kostroma Oblast, Russia. It is located in the north of the oblast. The area of the district is 2,178 square kilometers (841 sq mi). Its administrative center is the rural locality (a selo) of Georgiyevskoye. Population: 2,995 (2021 census); 4,461 (2010 census); 5,851 (2002 Census); 6,993 (1989 Soviet census). The population of Georgiyevskoye accounts for 56.3% of the district's total population.
