= Kuznetsovo, Chukhlomsky District, Kostroma Oblast =

Kuznetsovo Кузнецово
- Village
- Location within Kostroma Oblast Location within Russia
- Coordinates: 58.824722°N 42.445833°E
- Country: Russia
- Region: Kostroma Oblast
- District: Chukhlomsky District

Population (2014)
  - Total: 0
- Time zone: UTC+03:00

Kuznetsovo (Russian: Кузнецо́во) is a rural locality (a village) in Nozhkinskoye Rural Settlement of Chukhlomsky District, Kostroma Oblast, Russia. Its population is 0 as of 2014.

== History ==
The village received this name in 1966.
