= Ostrovskoye, Ostrovskoye (tsentralnoye) Settlement, Ostrovsky District, Kostroma Oblast =

Rural locality in Kostroma Oblast, Russia

Coordinates: 57°48′13″N 42°14′31″E

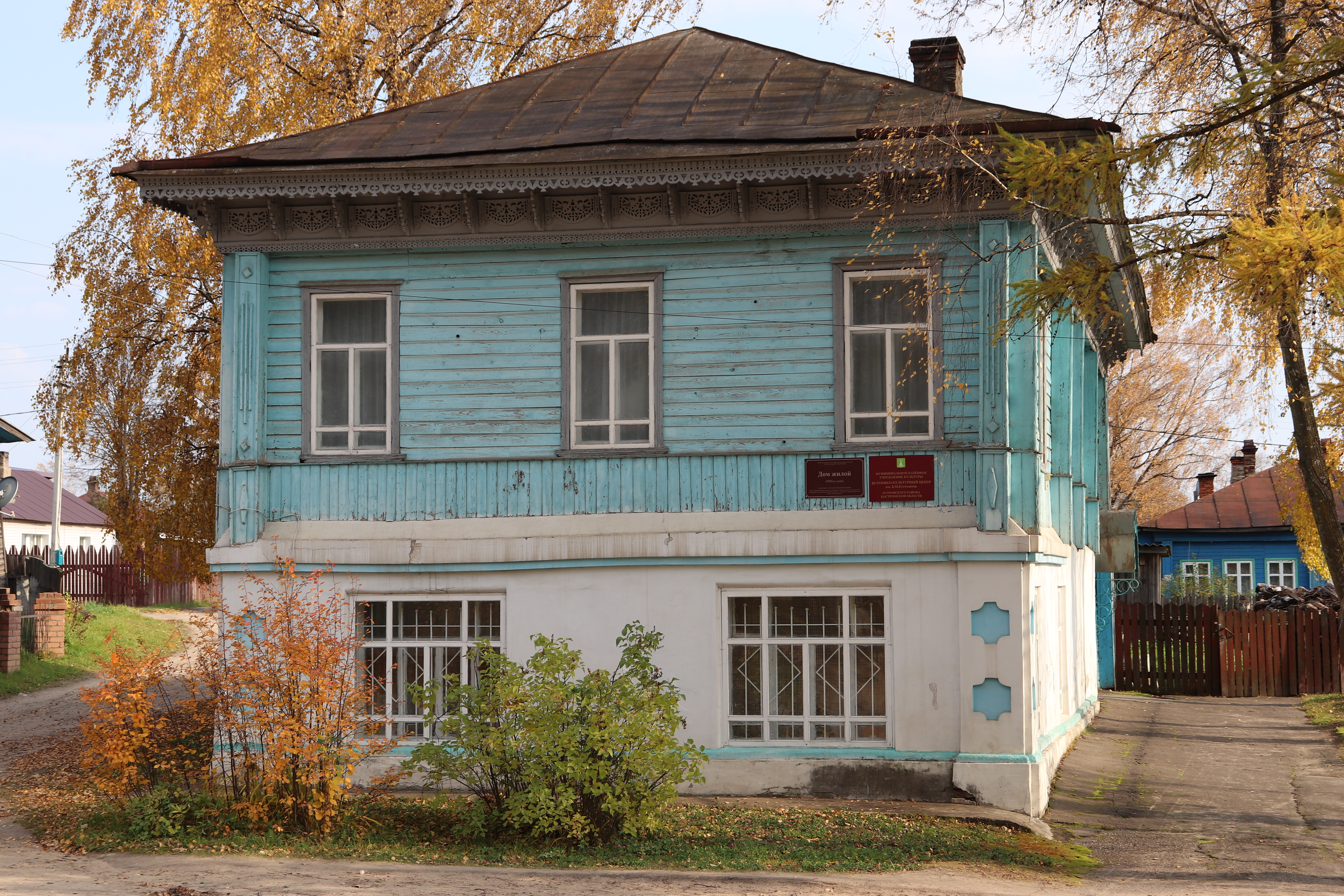
A house in the center of Ostrovskoye

Ostrovskoye (Russian: Остро́вское) is a rural locality (a settlement) and the administrative center of Ostrovsky District, Kostroma Oblast, Russia. Population: 4,218 (2021 census); 5,042 (2010 census); 5,273 (2002 census); 5,388 (1989 Soviet census).
