= Ababkovo, Galichsky District, Kostroma Oblast =

Ababkovo Абабково
- Village
- Location within Kostroma Oblast Location within Russia
- Coordinates: 58.360556°N 42.198611°E
- Country: Russia
- Region: Kostroma Oblast
- District: Galichsky District
- Time zone: UTC+3:00

Ababkovo (Russian: Аба́бково) is a rural locality (a selo) in Dmitriyevskoye Rural Settlement Galichsky District, Russia. The population was 7 as of 2014.

== Streets ==
There are no streets with titles.

== Geography ==
Ababkovo is located 10 km west of Galich (the district's administrative centre) by road. Shabalino is the nearest rural locality.
