= Borovskoy, Sharyinsky District, Kostroma Oblast =

Borovskoy Боровской
- Village
- Location in Kostroma Oblast
- Coordinates: 58°29′50″N 45°37′42″E
- Country: Russia
- Region: Kostroma Oblast
- District: Sharyinsky District

Population (2014)
  - Total: 30
- Time zone: UTC+03:00

Borovskoy (Russian: Боровско́й) is a village in Shangskoye Rural Settlement of Sharyinsky District, Kostroma Oblast, Russia. Its population is 30 as of 2014.

== History ==
The village received this name in 1966.

== Geography ==
Borovskoy is located 13 km south of Sharya (the district's administrative centre) by road.
