= Sudislavsky District =

Sudislavsky District Судиславский район (Russian)
- District
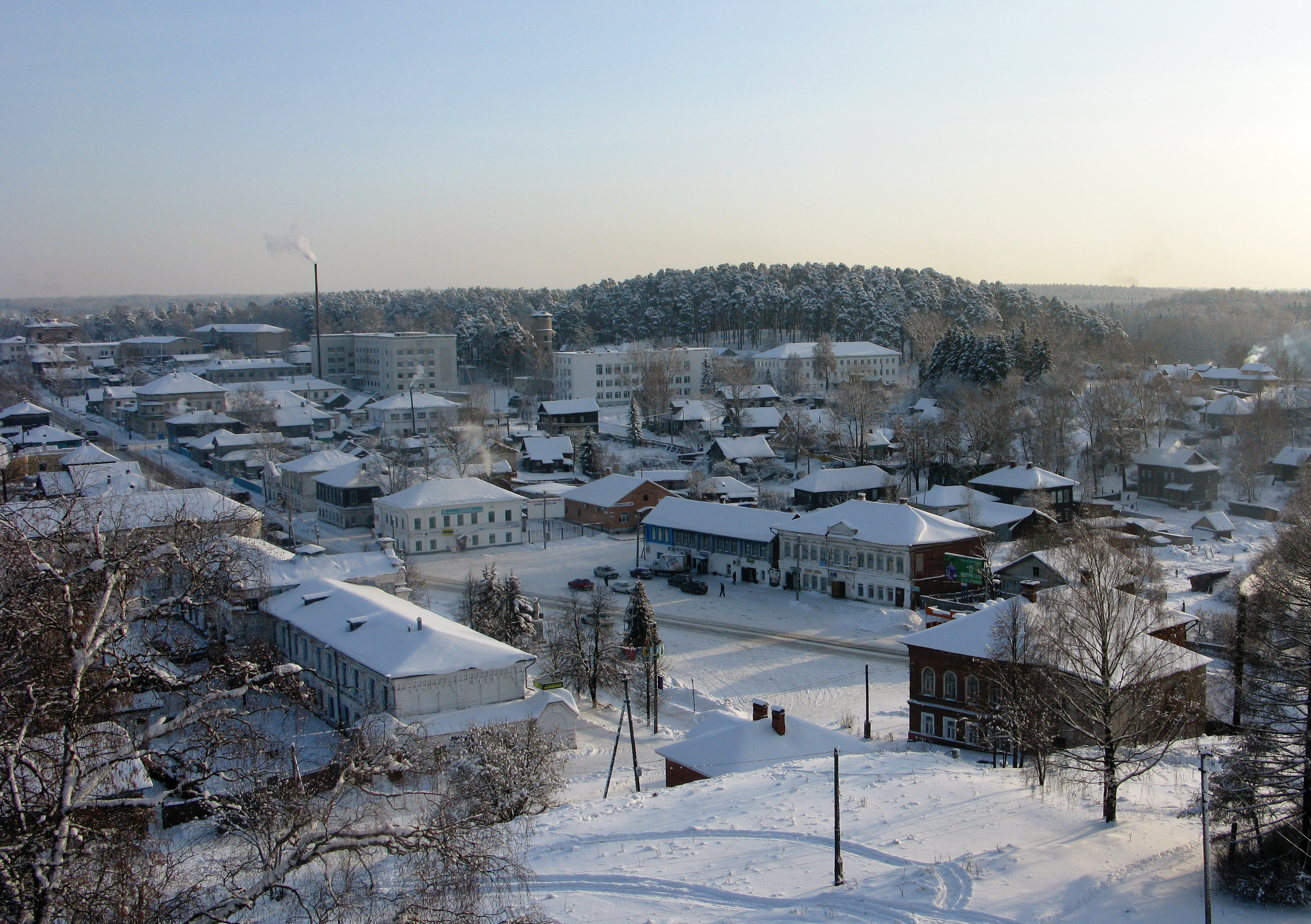
- Sudislavl, in Sudislavsky District

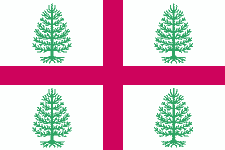
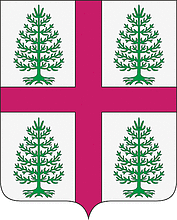
- Flag Coat of arms
- Location of Sudislavsky District in Kostroma Oblast
- Coordinates: 57°53′N 41°42′E
- Country: Russia
- Federal subject: Kostroma Oblast
- Administrative center: Sudislavl

Area
  - Total: 1,530 km^{2} (590 sq mi)

Population (2010 Census)
  - Total: 13,077
  - Density: 8.55/km^{2} (22.1/sq mi)
  - Urban: 37.6%
  - Rural: 62.4%

Administrative structure
  - Administrative divisions: 1 Urban settlements (urban-type settlements), 3 Settlements
  - Inhabited localities: 1 urban-type settlements, 174 rural localities

Municipal structure
  - Municipally incorporated as: Sudislavsky Municipal District
  - Municipal divisions: 1 urban settlements, 3 rural settlements
- Time zone: UTC+3 (MSK)
- OKTMO ID: 34642000
- Website: http://sudislavladm.ru/

Sudislavsky District (Russian: Судисла́вский район) is an administrative and municipal district (raion), one of the twenty-four in Kostroma Oblast, Russia. It is located in the southwest of the oblast. The area of the district is 1,530 square kilometers (590 sq mi). Its administrative center is the urban locality (an urban-type settlement) of Sudislavl. Population: 11,034 (2021 census); 13,077 (2010 census); 15,184 (2002 Census); 16,407 (1989 Soviet census). The population of Sudislavl accounts for 37.7% of the district's total population.
