= Antropovsky District =

Antropovsky District Антроповский район (Russian)
- District
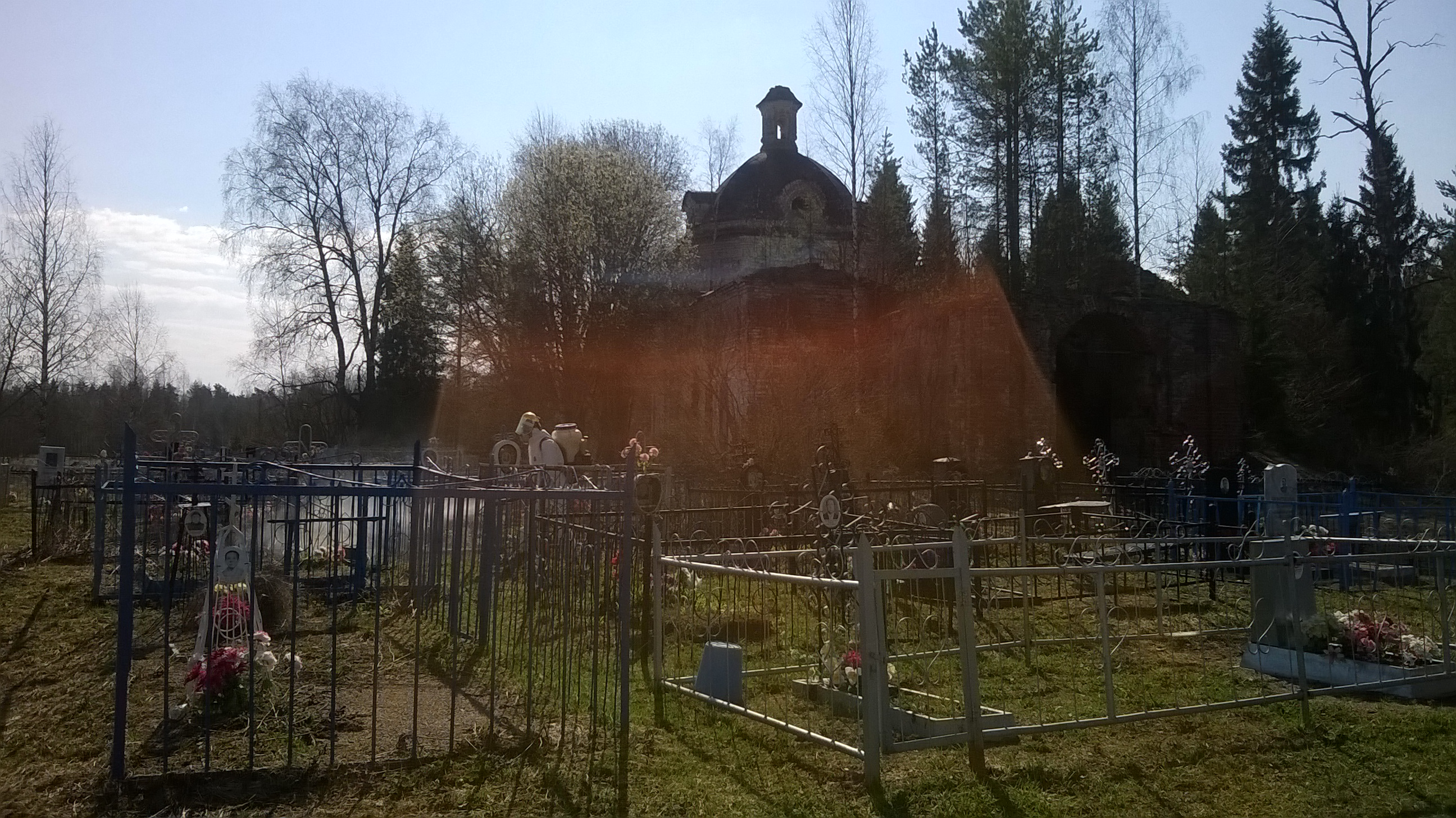
- Cemetery, Antropovsky District

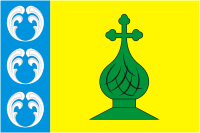
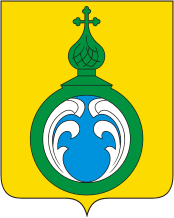
- Flag Coat of arms
- Location of Antropovsky District in Kostroma Oblast
- Coordinates: 58°24′N 43°01′E
- Country: Russia
- Federal subject: Kostroma Oblast
- Established: 1935
- Administrative center: Antropovo

Area
  - Total: 2,470 km^{2} (950 sq mi)

Population (2010 Census)
  - Total: 7,182
  - Density: 2.91/km^{2} (7.53/sq mi)
  - Urban: 0%
  - Rural: 100%

Administrative structure
  - Administrative divisions: 5 Settlements
  - Inhabited localities: 185 rural localities

Municipal structure
  - Municipally incorporated as: Antropovsky Municipal District
  - Municipal divisions: 0 urban settlements, 5 rural settlements
- Time zone: UTC+3 (MSK)
- OKTMO ID: 34602000
- Website: http://antropovo.info/

Antropovsky District (Russian: Антро́повский райо́н) is an administrative and municipal district (raion), one of the twenty-four in Kostroma Oblast, Russia. It is located in the center of the oblast. The area of the district is 2,470 square kilometers (950 sq mi). Its administrative center is the rural locality (a settlement) of Antropovo. Population: 5,296 (2021 census); 7,182 (2010 census); 9,088 (2002 Census); 11,134 (1989 Soviet census). The population of Antropovo accounts for 50.1% of the district's population.
