= Frolovsky (rural locality) =

Frolovsky (Russian: Фроловский; masculine), Frolovskaya (Фроловская; feminine), or Frolovskoye (Фроловское; neuter) is the name of several rural localities in Russia:

- Frolovsky, Karachevsky District, Bryansk Oblast, a settlement in Verkhopolsky Selsoviet of Karachevsky District of Bryansk Oblast
- Frolovsky, Komarichsky District, Bryansk Oblast, a settlement in Luboshevsky Selsoviet of Komarichsky District of Bryansk Oblast
- Frolovsky, Karachay-Cherkess Republic, a khutor in Zelenchuksky District of the Karachay-Cherkess Republic
- Frolovsky, Oryol Oblast, a settlement in Zhdimirsky Selsoviet of Znamensky District of Oryol Oblast
- Frolovsky, Rostov Oblast, a khutor in Bazkovskoye Rural Settlement of Sholokhovsky District of Rostov Oblast
- Frolovskoye, Kaluga Oblast, a selo in Kozelsky District of Kaluga Oblast
- Frolovskoye, Istrinsky District, Moscow Oblast, a village in Kostrovskoye Rural Settlement of Istrinsky District of Moscow Oblast
- Frolovskoye, Klinsky District, Moscow Oblast, a village under the administrative jurisdiction of the Town of Klin in Klinsky District of Moscow Oblast
- Frolovskoye, Ozyorsky District, Moscow Oblast, a selo in Klishinskoye Rural Settlement of Ozyorsky District of Moscow Oblast
- Frolovskoye, Shakhovskoy District, Moscow Oblast, a village in Ramenskoye Rural Settlement of Shakhovskoy District of Moscow Oblast
- Frolovskoye, Kstovsky District, Nizhny Novgorod Oblast, a village in Bolsheyelninsky Selsoviet of Kstovsky District of Nizhny Novgorod Oblast
- Frolovskoye, Pavlovsky District, Nizhny Novgorod Oblast, a selo in Grudtsinsky Selsoviet of Pavlovsky District of Nizhny Novgorod Oblast
- Frolovskoye, Kasimovsky District, Ryazan Oblast, a village in Krutoyarsky Rural Okrug of Kasimovsky District of Ryazan Oblast
- Frolovskoye, Sasovsky District, Ryazan Oblast, a selo in Gavrilovsky Rural Okrug of Sasovsky District of Ryazan Oblast
- Frolovskoye, Tver Oblast, a village in Kashinsky District of Tver Oblast
- Frolovskoye, Vladimir Oblast, a selo in Yuryev-Polsky District of Vladimir Oblast
- Frolovskoye, Vologda Oblast, a village in Markovsky Selsoviet of Vologodsky District of Vologda Oblast
- Frolovskoye, Yaroslavl Oblast, a selo in Novoselsky Rural Okrug of Bolsheselsky District of Yaroslavl Oblast
- Frolovskaya, Kotlassky District, Arkhangelsk Oblast, a village in Kharitonovsky Selsoviet of Kotlassky District of Arkhangelsk Oblast
- Frolovskaya, Krasnoborsky District, Arkhangelsk Oblast, a village in Alekseyevsky Selsoviet of Krasnoborsky District of Arkhangelsk Oblast
- Frolovskaya, Verkhnetoyemsky District, Arkhangelsk Oblast, a village in Vyysky Selsoviet of Verkhnetoyemsky District of Arkhangelsk Oblast
- Frolovskaya, Kirov Oblast, a village in Pashinsky Rural Okrug of Afanasyevsky District of Kirov Oblast
- Frolovskaya, Vologda Oblast, a village in Termengsky Selsoviet of Verkhovazhsky District of Vologda Oblast
