= Verkhovye =

Verkhovye (Russian: Верховье) is the name of several inhabited localities in Russia.

== Arkhangelsk Oblast ==
As of 2010, three rural localities in Arkhangelsk Oblast bear this name:

- Verkhovye, Nyandomsky District, Arkhangelsk Oblast, a village in Limsky Selsoviet of Nyandomsky District
- Verkhovye, Onezhsky District, Arkhangelsk Oblast, a village in Chekuyevsky Selsoviet of Onezhsky District
- Verkhovye, Primorsky District, Arkhangelsk Oblast, a village in Patrakeyevsky Selsoviet of Primorsky District

== Kaluga Oblast ==
As of 2010, four rural localities in Kaluga Oblast bear this name:

- Verkhovye (Yubileyny Rural Settlement), Maloyaroslavetsky District, Kaluga Oblast, a village in Maloyaroslavetsky District; municipally, a part of Yubileyny Rural Settlement of that district
- Verkhovye (Maklino Rural Settlement), Maloyaroslavetsky District, Kaluga Oblast, a village in Maloyaroslavetsky District; municipally, a part of Maklino Rural Settlement of that district
- Verkhovye (Zakharovo Rural Settlement), Maloyaroslavetsky District, Kaluga Oblast, a village in Maloyaroslavetsky District; municipally, a part of Zakharovo Rural Settlement of that district
- Verkhovye, Zhukovsky District, Kaluga Oblast, a village in Zhukovsky District

== Republic of Karelia ==
As of 2010, two rural localities in the Republic of Karelia bear this name:

- Verkhovye, Olonetsky District, Republic of Karelia, a village in Olonetsky District
- Verkhovye, Prionezhsky District, Republic of Karelia, a village in Prionezhsky District

== Kostroma Oblast ==
As of 2010, one rural locality in Kostroma Oblast bears this name:

- Verkhovye, Kostroma Oblast, a selo in Burdukovskoye Settlement of Soligalichsky District

== Leningrad Oblast ==
As of 2010, three rural localities in Leningrad Oblast bear this name:

- Verkhovye, Podborovskoye Settlement Municipal Formation, Boksitogorsky District, Leningrad Oblast, a village in Podborovskoye Settlement Municipal Formation of Boksitogorsky District
- Verkhovye, Samoylovskoye Settlement Municipal Formation, Boksitogorsky District, Leningrad Oblast, a village in Samoylovskoye Settlement Municipal Formation of Boksitogorsky District
- Verkhovye, Tikhvinsky District, Leningrad Oblast, a village in Shugozerskoye Settlement Municipal Formation of Tikhvinsky District

== Moscow Oblast ==
As of 2010, two rural localities in Moscow Oblast bear this name:

- Verkhovye, Pervomayskoye Rural Settlement, Naro-Fominsky District, Moscow Oblast, a village in Pervomayskoye Rural Settlement of Naro-Fominsky District
- Verkhovye, Volchenkovskoye Rural Settlement, Naro-Fominsky District, Moscow Oblast, a village in Volchenkovskoye Rural Settlement of Naro-Fominsky District

== Novgorod Oblast ==
As of 2010, one rural locality in Novgorod Oblast bears this name:

- Verkhovye, Novgorod Oblast, a village in Borkovskoye Settlement of Novgorodsky District

== Oryol Oblast ==
As of 2010, two inhabited localities in Oryol Oblast bear this name.

Urban localities

- Verkhovye, Verkhovsky District, Oryol Oblast, an urban-type settlement in Verkhovsky District

Rural localities

- Verkhovye, Galichinsky Selsoviet, Verkhovsky District, Oryol Oblast, a village in Galichinsky Selsoviet of Verkhovsky District

== Smolensk Oblast ==
As of 2010, five rural localities in Smolensk Oblast bear this name:

- Verkhovye, Dorogobuzhsky District, Smolensk Oblast, a village in Aleksinskoye Rural Settlement of Dorogobuzhsky District
- Verkhovye, Kholm-Zhirkovsky District, Smolensk Oblast, a village in Tomskoye Rural Settlement of Kholm-Zhirkovsky District
- Verkhovye, Smolensky District, Smolensk Oblast, a village in Novoselskoye Rural Settlement of Smolensky District
- Verkhovye, Belyayevskoye Rural Settlement, Velizhsky District, Smolensk Oblast, a village in Belyayevskoye Rural Settlement of Velizhsky District
- Verkhovye, Budnitskoye Rural Settlement, Velizhsky District, Smolensk Oblast, a village in Budnitskoye Rural Settlement of Velizhsky District

== Tula Oblast ==
As of 2010, one rural locality in Tula Oblast bears this name:

- Verkhovye, Tula Oblast, a village in Gvardeysky Rural Okrug of Dubensky District

== Tver Oblast ==
As of 2010, one rural locality in Tver Oblast bears this name:

- Verkhovye, Tver Oblast, a village in Belsky District

== Vologda Oblast ==
As of 2010, eight rural localities in Vologda Oblast bear this name:

- Verkhovye, Babayevsky District, Vologda Oblast, a village in Saninsky Selsoviet of Babayevsky District
- Verkhovye, Belozersky District, Vologda Oblast, a village in Sholsky Selsoviet of Belozersky District
- Verkhovye, Korotovsky Selsoviet, Cherepovetsky District, Vologda Oblast, a village in Korotovsky Selsoviet of Cherepovetsky District
- Verkhovye, Shalimovsky Selsoviet, Cherepovetsky District, Vologda Oblast, a selo in Shalimovsky Selsoviet of Cherepovetsky District
- Verkhovye, Gryazovetsky District, Vologda Oblast, a village in Sidorovsky Selsoviet of Gryazovetsky District
- Verkhovye, Kaduysky District, Vologda Oblast, a village in Chuprinsky Selsoviet of Kaduysky District
- Verkhovye, Nyuksensky District, Vologda Oblast, a village in Brusnovolovsky Selsoviet of Nyuksensky District
- Verkhovye, Vytegorsky District, Vologda Oblast, a village in Megorsky Selsoviet of Vytegorsky District

== Voronezh Oblast ==
As of 2010, one rural locality in Voronezh Oblast bears this name:

- Verkhovye, Voronezh Oblast, a khutor in Skupopotudanskoye Rural Settlement of Nizhnedevitsky District
