= Nizovki =

Nizovki Низовки
- Village
- Location within Vologda Oblast Location within Russia
- Coordinates: 60°14′N 44°03′E
- Country: Russia
- Region: Vologda Oblast
- District: Nyuksensky District
- Time zone: UTC+3:00

Nizovki (Russian: Низовки) is a rural locality (a village) in Gorodishchenskoye Rural Settlement, Nyuksensky District, Vologda Oblast, Russia. The population was 38 as of 2002.

== Geography ==
Nizovki is located 57 km southwest of Nyuksenitsa (the district's administrative centre) by road. Nizovki is the nearest rural locality.
