= Sovetskaya, Vologda Oblast =

Sovetskaya Советская
- Village
- Location within Vologda Oblast Location within Russia
- Coordinates: 60°24′N 44°15′E
- Country: Russia
- Region: Vologda Oblast
- District: Nyuksensky District
- Time zone: UTC+3:00

Sovetskaya (Russian: Советская) is a rural locality (a village) in Nyuksenskoye Rural Settlement, Nyuksensky District, Vologda Oblast, Russia. The population was 46 as of 2002.

== Geography ==
Sovetskaya is located 18 km (11 mi) southeast of Nyuksenitsa (the district's administrative centre) by road. Sovetsky is the nearest rural locality.
