= Malaya Selmenga =

Malaya Selmenga Малая Сельменга
- Village
- Location within Vologda Oblast Location within Russia
- Coordinates: 60°28′N 44°29′E
- Country: Russia
- Region: Vologda Oblast
- District: Nyuksensky District
- Time zone: UTC+3:00

Malaya Selmenga (Russian: Малая Сельменга) is a rural locality (a village) in Nyuksenskoye Rural Settlement, Nyuksensky District, Vologda Oblast, Russia. The population was 26 as of 2002.

== Geography ==
Malaya Selmenga is located 56 km southwest of Nyuksenitsa (the district's administrative centre) by road. Slekishino is the nearest rural locality.
