= Zimnyak, Nyuksensky District, Vologda Oblast =

Zimnyak Зимняк
- Settlement
- Location within Vologda Oblast Location within Russia
- Coordinates: 60°09′N 43°43′E
- Country: Russia
- Region: Vologda Oblast
- District: Nyuksensky District
- Time zone: UTC+3:00

Zimnyak (Russian: Зимняк) is a rural locality (a settlement) in Igmasskoye Rural Settlement, Nyuksensky District, Vologda Oblast, Russia. The population was 20 as of 2002.

== Geography ==
Zimnyak is located 46 km southwest of Nyuksenitsa (the district's administrative centre) by road. Peski is the nearest rural locality.
