= Northern Dvina Governorate =

1918–1929 unit of Russia

Coordinates: 60°46′N 46°18′E

Northern Dvina Governorate Северо-Двинская губерния
- Governorate of the Russian SFSR
- 1918–1929
- Capital: Veliky Ustyug
- Area
  - 1926: 105.043 km^{2} (40.557 sq mi)
- Population
  - 1926: 678.110
- History
  - Established: July 24 1918
  - Disestablished: July 15 1929
- Political subdivisions: five uyezds, then eighteen districts

Northern Dvina Governorate (Russian: Северо-Двинская губерния, romanized: Severo-Dvinskaya guberniya) was an administrative-territorial unit (guberniya) of the Russian SFSR from 1918 to 1929. Its seat was in the city of Veliky Ustyug. The governorate was located in the North of European Russia, and its territory is currently divided between Arkhangelsk, Vologda, Kostroma, and Kirov Oblasts and the Komi Republic. The name of the governorate originates from the Northern Dvina River.

== History ==
The governorate was established on July 24, 1918 by the People's Commissariat for Internal Affairs of the Russian Soviet Federative Socialist Republic. The territory of the governorate was formed from five uyezds which were previously a part of Vologda Governorate (the uyezd centers are given in parentheses)

- Nikolsky Uyezd (Nikolsk);
- Solvychegodsky Uyezd (Solvychegodsk);
- Ust-Sysolsky Uyezd (Ust-Sysolsk);
- Velikoustyuzhsky Uyezd (Veliky Ustyug);
- Yarensky Uyezd (Yarensk).

In August 1921, the eastern part of the Governorate was split off and moved to the newly formed Komi-Zyryan Autonomous Oblast.

On April 18, 1924, the uyezds were abolished, and the governorate was divided into 18 districts (raions).

- Cherevkovsky District (Cherevkovo);
- Kichmengsko-Gorodetsky District (Kichmengsky Gorodok);
- Kotlassky District (Kotlas);
- Krasnoborsky District (Krasnoborsk);
- Lalsky District (Lalsk);
- Lensky District (Yarensk);
- Nikolsky District (Nikolsk);
- Nyuksensky District (Nyuksenitsa);
- Oparinsky District (Oparino);
- Podosinovsky District (Podosinovets);
- Roslyatinsky District (Roslyatino);
- Solvychegodsky District (Solvychegodsk);
- Ust-Alexeyevsky District (Ust-Alexeyevo);
- Velikoustyugsky District (Veliky Ustyug);
- Verkhnetoyemsky District (Verkhnyaya Toyma);
- Vilegodsky District (Ilyinsko-Podomskoye);
- Vokhomsky District (Vokhma);
- Yenangsky District (Nizhny Yenangsk).

On February 27, 1928 Ust-Alexeyevsky District was merged into Velikoustygsky District, and Yenangsky District was merged into Kichmengsko-Gorodetsky District. Simultaneously, Nyuksensky District was renamed into Sukhonsky District. On March 29, 1928, Solvychegodsky District was merged into Kotlassky District.

On July 15, 1929 All-Russian Central Executive Committee by a decree abolished Northern Dvina Governorate and established the Northern Dvina Okrug, which was a part of Northern Krai. The Okrug had the same territory as the abolished governorate, with the addition of Brusnovolovsky Selsoviet from the former Totemsky Uyezd of the Vologda Governorate. The Okrug administration was located in Veliky Ustyug.

The Northern Dvina Okrug was abolished in 1930. Northern Krai was in 1936 transformed into Northern Oblast. In 1937, Northern Oblast was split into Arkhangelsk Oblast and Vologda Oblast. Lalsky, Podosinovsky, and Oparinsky Districts in 1941 were transferred from Arkhangelsk to Kirov Oblast. Vokhomsky District and a part of Nikolsky District ended up in Kostroma Oblast. The parts of the Northern Dvina Governorate split off to Komi-Zyryan Autonomous Oblast in 1921 remain in the Komi Republic.
