= Brusnovolovsky Pogost =

Brusnovolovsky Pogost Брусноволовский Погост
- Village
- Location within Vologda Oblast Location within Russia
- Coordinates: 60°13′N 44°05′E
- Country: Russia
- Region: Vologda Oblast
- District: Nyuksensky District
- Time zone: UTC+3:00

Brusnovolovsky Pogost (Russian: Брусноволовский Погост) is a rural locality (a village) in Gorodishchenskoye Rural Settlement, Nyuksensky District, Vologda Oblast, Russia. The population was 98 as of 2002. There are 4 streets.

== Geography ==
Brusnovolovsky Pogost is located 55 km southwest of Nyuksenitsa (the district's administrative centre) by road. Dor is the nearest rural locality.
