= Gora, Nyuksensky District, Vologda Oblast =

Gora Гора
- Village
- Location within Vologda Oblast Location within Russia
- Coordinates: 60°28′N 44°29′E
- Country: Russia
- Region: Vologda Oblast
- District: Nyuksensky District
- Time zone: UTC+3:00

Gora (Russian: Гора) is a rural locality (a village) in Nyuksenskoye Rural Settlement, Nyuksensky District, Vologda Oblast, Russia. The population was 25 as of 2002.

== Geography ==
Gora is located 36 km northeast of Nyuksenitsa (the district's administrative centre) by road. Malaya Selmenga is the nearest rural locality.
