= Veliky Dvor, Nyuksensky District, Vologda Oblast =

Veliky Dvor Великий Двор
- Village
- Location within Vologda Oblast Location within Russia
- Coordinates: 60°12′N 44°21′E
- Country: Russia
- Region: Vologda Oblast
- District: Nyuksensky District
- Time zone: UTC+3:00

Veliky Dvor (Russian: Великий Двор) is a rural locality (a village) in Gorodishchenskoye Rural Settlement, Nyuksensky District, Vologda Oblast, Russia. The population was 44 as of 2002.

== Geography ==
Veliky Dvor is located 41 km southeast of Nyuksenitsa (the district's administrative centre) by road. Yushkovo is the nearest rural locality.
