= Vostroye =

Vostroye Вострое
- Village
- Location within Vologda Oblast Location within Russia
- Coordinates: 60°32′N 44°55′E
- Country: Russia
- Region: Vologda Oblast
- District: Nyuksensky District
- Time zone: UTC+3:00

Vostroye (Russian: Вострое) is a rural locality (a village) and the administrative center of Vostrovskoye Rural Settlement, Nyuksensky District, Vologda Oblast, Russia. The population was 223 as of 2002. There are 6 streets.

== Geography ==
Vostroye is located 62 km northeast of Nyuksenitsa (the district's administrative centre) by road. Zabolotye is the nearest rural locality.
