= Zadny Dvor, Nyuksensky District, Vologda Oblast =

Zadny Dvor Задний Двор
- Village
- Location within Vologda Oblast Location within Russia
- Coordinates: 60°13′N 44°28′E
- Country: Russia
- Region: Vologda Oblast
- District: Nyuksensky District
- Time zone: UTC+3:00

Zadny Dvor (Russian: Задний Двор) is a rural locality (a village) in Gorodishchenskoye Rural Settlement, Nyuksensky District, Vologda Oblast, Russia. The population was 12 as of 2002.

== Geography ==
Zadny Dvor is located 44 km southeast of Nyuksenitsa (the district's administrative centre) by road. Kosmarevskaya Kuliga is the nearest rural locality.
