= Levash =

Levash may refer to several localities in Russia:

- A rural locality in Babushkinsky District, Vologda Oblast
- Levash, Totemsky District, Vologda Oblast
- Levash, Nyuksensky District, Vologda Oblast
