= Prozhektor =

Prozhektor Прожектор
- Village
- Location within Vologda Oblast Location within Russia
- Coordinates: 60°24′N 44°12′E
- Country: Russia
- Region: Vologda Oblast
- District: Nyuksensky District
- Time zone: UTC+3:00

Prozhektor (Russian: Прожектор) is a rural locality (a village) in Nyuksenskoye Rural Settlement, Nyuksensky District, Vologda Oblast, Russia. The population was 47 as of 2002.

== Geography ==
Prozhektor is located 3 km southeast of Nyuksenitsa (the district's administrative centre) by road. Nyuksenitsa is the nearest rural locality.
