= Solvychegodsky =

Solvychegodsky (masculine), Solvychegodskaya (feminine), or Solvychegodskoye (neuter) may refer to:

- Solvychegodsky District, a former district of Northern Dvina Governorate (1924–1929) and Arkhangelsk Oblast (1938–1958) in the Russian SFSR
- Solvychegodsky Uyezd, an administrative division in the Russian Empire and the early Russian SFSR; most recently (1918–1924) a part of Northern Dvina Governorate
- Solvychegodskoye Urban Settlement, a municipal formation which the town of Solvychegodsk and ninety-three rural localities in Kotlassky District of Arkhangelsk Oblast, Russia are incorporated as
- Solvychegodsky Selsoviet, an administrative division of Kotlassky District in Arkhangelsk Oblast, Russia
