= Mygra =

Mygra Мыгра
- Village
- Location within Vologda Oblast Location within Russia
- Coordinates: 60°16′N 44°22′E
- Country: Russia
- Region: Vologda Oblast
- District: Nyuksensky District
- Time zone: UTC+3:00

Mygra (Russian: Мыгра) is a rural locality (a village) in Gorodishchenskoye Rural Settlement, Nyuksensky District, Vologda Oblast, Russia. The population was 12 as of 2002.

== Geography ==
Mygra is located 35 km southeast of Nyuksenitsa (the district's administrative centre) by road. Makarino is the nearest rural locality.
