= Verkhneye Kamennoye =

Verkhneye Kamennoye Верхнее Каменное
- Village
- Location within Vologda Oblast Location within Russia
- Coordinates: 60°12′N 44°16′E
- Country: Russia
- Region: Vologda Oblast
- District: Nyuksensky District
- Time zone: UTC+3:00

Verkhneye Kamennoye (Russian: Верхнее Каменное) is a rural locality (a village) in Gorodishchenskoye Rural Settlement, Nyuksensky District, Vologda Oblast, Russia. The population was 6 as of 2002.

== Geography ==
Verkhneye Kamennoye is located 44 km south of Nyuksenitsa (the district's administrative centre) by road. Fedkovskaya is the nearest rural locality.
