= Brusenets =

Brusenets Брусенец
- Village
- Location within Vologda Oblast Location within Russia
- Coordinates: 60°14′N 43°57′E
- Country: Russia
- Region: Vologda Oblast
- District: Nyuksensky District
- Time zone: UTC+3:00

Brusenets (Russian: Брусенец) is a rural locality (a village) in Gorodishchenskoye Rural Settlement, Nyuksensky District, Vologda Oblast, Russia. The population was 129 as of 2002.

== Geography ==
Brusenets is located 60 km southwest of Nyuksenitsa (the district's administrative centre) by road. Pustynya is the nearest rural locality.
