= Larinskaya, Vologda Oblast =

Larinskaya Ларинская
- Village
- Location within Vologda Oblast Location within Russia
- Coordinates: 60°22′N 44°16′E
- Country: Russia
- Region: Vologda Oblast
- District: Nyuksensky District
- Time zone: UTC+3:00

Larinskaya (Russian: Ларинская) is a rural locality (a village) in Nyuksenskoye Rural Settlement, Nyuksensky District, Vologda Oblast, Russia. The population was 37 as of 2002.

== Geography ==
Larinskaya is located 20 km southeast of Nyuksenitsa (the district's administrative centre) by road. Sovetsky is the nearest rural locality.
