= Kuznetsovskaya, Nyuksensky District, Vologda Oblast =

Kuznetsovskaya Кузнецовская
- Village
- Location within Vologda Oblast Location within Russia
- Coordinates: 60°29′N 44°08′E
- Country: Russia
- Region: Vologda Oblast
- District: Nyuksensky District
- Time zone: UTC+3:00

Kuznetsovskaya (Russian: Кузнецовская) is a rural locality (a village) in Nyuksenskoye Rural Settlement, Nyuksensky District, Vologda Oblast, Russia. The population was 3 as of 2002.

== Geography ==
Kuznetsovskaya is located 13 km northwest of Nyuksenitsa (the district's administrative centre) by road. Zaborye is the nearest rural locality.
