= Opalikhi =

Opalikhi Опалихи
- Village
- Location within Vologda Oblast Location within Russia
- Coordinates: 60°08′N 44°15′E
- Country: Russia
- Region: Vologda Oblast
- District: Nyuksensky District
- Time zone: UTC+3:00

Opalikhi (Russian: Опалихи) is a rural locality (a village) in Gorodishchenskoye Rural Settlement, Nyuksensky District, Vologda Oblast, Russia. The population was 25 as of 2002.

== Geography ==
Opalikhi is located 51 km south of Nyuksenitsa (the district's administrative centre) by road. Malye Ivki is the nearest rural locality.
