= Panfilikha =

Panfilikha Панфилиха
- Village
- Location within Vologda Oblast Location within Russia
- Coordinates: 60°27′N 44°50′E
- Country: Russia
- Region: Vologda Oblast
- District: Nyuksensky District
- Time zone: UTC+3:00

Panfilikha (Russian: Панфилиха) is a rural locality (a village) in Nyuksenskoye Rural Settlement, Nyuksensky District, Vologda Oblast, Russia. The population was 1 as of 2002.

== Geography ==
Panfilikha is located 54 km northeast of Nyuksenitsa (the district's administrative centre) by road. Razulichye is the nearest rural locality.
