= Bolshiye Ivki =

Bolshiye Ivki Большие Ивки
- Village
- Location within Vologda Oblast Location within Russia
- Coordinates: 60°08′N 44°14′E
- Country: Russia
- Region: Vologda Oblast
- District: Nyuksensky District
- Time zone: UTC+3:00

Bolshiye Ivki (Russian: Большие Ивки) is a rural locality (a village) in Gorodishchenskoye Rural Settlement, Nyuksensky District, Vologda Oblast, Russia. The population was 25 as of 2002.

== Geography ==
Bolshiye Ivki is located 53 km south of Nyuksenitsa (the district's administrative centre) by road. Malye Ivki is the nearest rural locality.
