= Korolevskaya =

Korolevskaya Королевская
- Village
- Location within Vologda Oblast Location within Russia
- Coordinates: 60°35′N 44°10′E
- Country: Russia
- Region: Vologda Oblast
- District: Nyuksensky District
- Time zone: UTC+3:00

Korolevskaya (Russian: Королевская) is a rural locality (a village) in Nyuksenskoye Rural Settlement, Nyuksensky District, Vologda Oblast, Russia. The population was 5 as of 2002.

== Geography ==
Korolevskaya is located 23 km north of Nyuksenitsa (the district's administrative centre) by road. Ivanovskaya is the nearest rural locality.
