= Sakulinskaya =

Sakulinskaya Сакулинская
- Village
- Location within Arkhangelsk Oblast Location within Russia
- Coordinates: 61°43′N 45°20′E
- Country: Russia
- Region: Arkhangelsk Oblast
- District: Krasnoborsky District
- Time zone: UTC+3:00

Sakulinskaya (Russian: Сакулинская) is a rural locality (a village) in Cherevkovskoye Rural Settlement, Krasnoborsky District, Arkhangelsk Oblast, Russia. The population was 174 as of 2010.

== Geography ==
Sakulinskaya is located 40 km northwest of Krasnoborsk (the district's administrative centre) by road. Bolshaya Kletsovskaya is the nearest rural locality.
