= Igmas =

Igmas Игмас
- Settlement
- Location within Vologda Oblast Location within Russia
- Coordinates: 60°10′N 43°46′E
- Country: Russia
- Region: Vologda Oblast
- District: Nyuksensky District
- Time zone: UTC+3:00

Igmas (Russian: Игмас) is a rural locality (a settlement) and the administrative center of Igmasskoye Rural Settlement, Nyuksensky District, Vologda Oblast, Russia. The population was 866 as of 2002. There are 6 streets.

== Geography ==
Igmas is located 45 km southwest of Nyuksenitsa (the district's administrative centre) by road. Kirillovo is the nearest rural locality.
