= Berezovaya Slobodka =

Berezovaya Slobodka Березовая Слободка
- Village
- Location within Vologda Oblast Location within Russia
- Coordinates: 60°23′N 44°09′E
- Country: Russia
- Region: Vologda Oblast
- District: Nyuksensky District
- Time zone: UTC+3:00

Berezovaya Slobodka (Russian: Березовая Слободка) is a rural locality (a village) in Nyuksenskoye Rural Settlement, Nyuksensky District, Vologda Oblast, Russia. The population was 393 as of 2002. There are 16 streets.

== Geography ==
Berezovaya Slobodka is located 12 km southwest of Nyuksenitsa (the district's administrative centre) by road. Nyuksenitsa is the nearest rural locality.
