= Kazakovo, Nyuksensky District, Vologda Oblast =

Kazakovo Казаково
- Village
- Location within Vologda Oblast Location within Russia
- Coordinates: 60°14′N 44°22′E
- Country: Russia
- Region: Vologda Oblast
- District: Nyuksensky District
- Time zone: UTC+3:00

Kazakovo (Russian: Казаково) is a rural locality (a village) in Gorodishchenskoye Rural Settlement, Nyuksensky District, Vologda Oblast, Russia. The population was 7 as of 2002.

== Geography ==
Kazakovo is located 36 km southeast of Nyuksenitsa (the district's administrative centre) by road. Kozlovo is the nearest rural locality.
