= Cherevkovo, Arkhangelsk Oblast =

Rural locality in Russia

Cherevkovo Черевково
- Selo
- Location within Arkhangelsk Oblast Location within Russia
- Coordinates: 61°46′N 45°16′E
- Country: Russia
- Region: Arkhangelsk Oblast
- District: Krasnoborsky District
- Time zone: UTC+3:00

Cherevkovo (Russian: Черевково) is a rural locality (a selo) and the administrative center of Cherevkovskoye Rural Settlement of Krasnoborsky District, Arkhangelsk Oblast, Russia. The population was 1,005 as of 2010.

From 1924 to 1959, Cherevkovo was the administrative center of Cherevkovsky District. It was initially established in Northern Dvina Governorate. On September 11, 1959, the district was abolished and split between Krasnoborsky, Verkhnetoyemsky, and Ustyansky Districts. There are 23 streets.

== Geography ==
Cherevkovo is located on the Northern Dvina, 47 km northwest of Krasnoborsk (the district's administrative centre) by road. Osorginskaya is the nearest rural locality.
