= Bolshaya Selmenga =

Bolshaya Selmenga Большая Сельменга
- Village
- Location within Vologda Oblast Location within Russia
- Coordinates: 60°14′N 44°04′E
- Country: Russia
- Region: Vologda Oblast
- District: Nyuksensky District
- Time zone: UTC+3:00

Bolshaya Selmenga (Russian: Большая Сельменга) is a rural locality (a village) in Nyuksenskoye Rural Settlement, Nyuksensky District, Vologda Oblast, Russia. The population was 28 as of 2002. There are 2 streets.

== Geography ==
Bolshaya Selmenga is located 35 km northeast of Nyuksenitsa (the district's administrative centre) by road. Krasavino is the nearest rural locality.
