= Kosmarevskaya Kuliga =

Kosmarevskaya Kuliga Космаревская Кулига
- Village
- Location within Vologda Oblast Location within Russia
- Coordinates: 60°13′N 44°26′E
- Country: Russia
- Region: Vologda Oblast
- District: Nyuksensky District
- Time zone: UTC+3:00

Kosmarevskaya Kuliga (Russian: Космаревская Кулига) is a rural locality (a village) in Gorodishchenskoye Rural Settlement, Nyuksensky District, Vologda Oblast, Russia. The population was 39 as of 2002.

== Geography ==
Kosmarevskaya Kuliga is located 43 km southeast of Nyuksenitsa (the district's administrative centre) by road. Matveyevskaya is the nearest rural locality.
