= Lesyutino =

Lesyutino Лесютино
- Village
- Location within Vologda Oblast Location within Russia
- Coordinates: 60°29′N 44°07′E
- Country: Russia
- Region: Vologda Oblast
- District: Nyuksensky District
- Time zone: UTC+3:00

Lesyutino (Russian: Лесютино) is a rural locality (a village) in Nyuksenskoye Rural Settlement, Nyuksensky District, Vologda Oblast, Russia. The population was 279 as of 2002. There are 11 streets.

== Geography ==
Lesyutino is located 14 km northwest of Nyuksenitsa (the district's administrative centre) by road. Zaborye is the nearest rural locality.
