= Nizhneye Kamennoye =

Nizhneye Kamennoye Нижнее Каменное
- Village
- Location within Vologda Oblast Location within Russia
- Coordinates: 60°16′N 44°22′E
- Country: Russia
- Region: Vologda Oblast
- District: Nyuksensky District
- Time zone: UTC+3:00

Nizhneye Kamennoye (Russian: Нижнее Каменное) is a rural locality (a village) in Gorodishchenskoye Rural Settlement, Nyuksensky District, Vologda Oblast, Russia. The population was 6 as of 2002.

== Geography ==
Nizhneye Kamennoye is located 36 km southeast of Nyuksenitsa (the district's administrative centre) by road. Dvorishche is the nearest rural locality.
