= Gorodishchna =

Gorodishchna Городищна
- Selo
- Location within Vologda Oblast Location within Russia
- Coordinates: 60°13′N 44°22′E
- Country: Russia
- Region: Vologda Oblast
- District: Nyuksensky District
- Time zone: UTC+3:00

Gorodishchna (Russian: Городищна) is a rural locality (a selo) and the administrative center of Gorodishchenskoye Rural Settlement, Nyuksensky District, Vologda Oblast, Russia. The population was 701 as of 2002. There are 9 streets.

== Geography ==
Gorodishchna is located 38 km southeast of Nyuksenitsa (the district's administrative centre) by road. Zhar is the nearest rural locality.
