= Verkhnyaya Gorka =

Verkhnyaya Gorka Верхняя Горка
- Village
- Location within Vologda Oblast Location within Russia
- Coordinates: 60°13′N 44°20′E
- Country: Russia
- Region: Vologda Oblast
- District: Nyuksensky District
- Time zone: UTC+3:00

Verkhnyaya Gorka (Russian: Верхняя Горка) is a rural locality (a village) in Gorodishchenskoye Rural Settlement, Nyuksensky District, Vologda Oblast, Russia. The population was 37 as of 2002.

== Geography ==
Verkhnyaya Gorka is located 40 km southeast of Nyuksenitsa (the district's administrative centre) by road. Sofronovskaya is the nearest rural locality.
