= Kileynaya Vystavka =

Kileynaya Vystavka Килейная Выставка
- Village
- Location within Vologda Oblast Location within Russia
- Coordinates: 60°30′N 44°47′E
- Country: Russia
- Region: Vologda Oblast
- District: Nyuksensky District
- Time zone: UTC+3:00

Kileynaya Vystavka (Russian: Килейная Выставка) is a rural locality (a village) in Nyuksenskoye Rural Settlement, Nyuksensky District, Vologda Oblast, Russia. The population was 15 as of 2002.

== Geography ==
Kileynaya Vystavka is located 49 km northeast of Nyuksenitsa (the district's administrative centre) by road. Bobrovskoye is the nearest rural locality.
