= Kopylovo, Nyuksensky District, Vologda Oblast =

Kopylovo Копылово
- Settlement
- Location within Vologda Oblast Location within Russia
- Coordinates: 60°34′N 45°04′E
- Country: Russia
- Region: Vologda Oblast
- District: Nyuksensky District
- Time zone: UTC+3:00

Kopylovo (Russian: Копылово) is a rural locality (a settlement) in Vostrovskoye Rural Settlement, Nyuksensky District, Vologda Oblast, Russia. The population was 277 as of 2002. There are 11 streets.

== Geography ==
Kopylovo is located 77 km northeast of Nyuksenitsa (the district's administrative centre) by road. Strelka is the nearest rural locality.
