= Kokshenskaya =

Kokshenskaya Кокшенская
- Village
- Location within Vologda Oblast Location within Russia
- Coordinates: 60°28′N 44°04′E
- Country: Russia
- Region: Vologda Oblast
- District: Nyuksensky District
- Time zone: UTC+3:00

Kokshenskaya (Russian: Кокшенская) is a rural locality (a village) in Nyuksenskoye Rural Settlement, Nyuksensky District, Vologda Oblast, Russia. The population was 71 as of 2002.

== Geography ==
Kokshenskaya is located 18 km northwest of Nyuksenitsa (the district's administrative centre) by road. Pozharishche is the nearest rural locality.
