= Norovo, Vologda Oblast =

Norovo Норово
- Village
- Location within Vologda Oblast Location within Russia
- Coordinates: 60°24′N 44°17′E
- Country: Russia
- Region: Vologda Oblast
- District: Nyuksensky District
- Time zone: UTC+3:00

Norovo (Russian: Норово) is a rural locality (a village) in Nyuksenskoye Rural Settlement, Nyuksensky District, Vologda Oblast, Russia. The population was 15 as of 2002.

== Geography ==
Norovo is located 20 km east of Nyuksenitsa (the district's administrative centre) by road. Berezovo is the nearest rural locality.
