= Dyabrino =

Dyabrino Дябрино
- Settlement
- Location within Arkhangelsk Oblast Location within Russia
- Coordinates: 61°34′N 45°57′E
- Country: Russia
- Region: Arkhangelsk Oblast
- District: Krasnoborsky District
- Time zone: UTC+3:00

Dyabrino (Russian: Дябрино) is a rural locality (a settlement) in Alexeyevskoye Rural Settlement of Krasnoborsky District, Arkhangelsk Oblast, Russia. The population was 374 as of 2010. There are 10 streets.

== Geography ==
Dyabrino is located on the Severnaya Dvina River, 7 km north of Krasnoborsk (the district's administrative centre) by road. Krasnoborsk is the nearest rural locality.
