= Ustye-Gorodishchenskoye =

Ustye-Gorodishchenskoye Устье-Городищенское
- Village
- Location within Vologda Oblast Location within Russia
- Coordinates: 60°25′N 44°17′E
- Country: Russia
- Region: Vologda Oblast
- District: Nyuksensky District
- Time zone: UTC+3:00

Ustye-Gorodishchenskoye (Russian: Устье-Городищенское) is a rural locality (a village) in Nyuksenskoye Rural Settlement, Nyuksensky District, Vologda Oblast, Russia. The population was 65 as of 2002. There are 4 streets.

== Geography ==
Ustye-Gorodishchenskoye is located 21 km northeast of Nyuksenitsa (the district's administrative centre) by road. Berezovo is the nearest rural locality.
