= Zaborye, Nyuksensky District, Vologda Oblast =

Zaborye Заборье
- Village
- Location within Vologda Oblast Location within Russia
- Coordinates: 60°29′N 44°08′E
- Country: Russia
- Region: Vologda Oblast
- District: Nyuksensky District
- Time zone: UTC+3:00

Zaborye (Russian: Заборье) is a rural locality (a village) in Nyuksenskoye Rural Settlement, Nyuksensky District, Vologda Oblast, Russia. The population was 15 as of 2002.

== Geography ==
Zaborye is situated 14 km 14 kilometers northwest of Nyuksenitsa which serves as the administrative center of the district. The nearest rural locality to Zaborye is Lesyutino.
