= Matveyevo, Nyuksensky District, Vologda Oblast =

Matveyevo Матвеево
- Settlement
- Location within Vologda Oblast Location within Russia
- Coordinates: 60°28′N 44°37′E
- Country: Russia
- Region: Vologda Oblast
- District: Nyuksensky District
- Time zone: UTC+3:00

Matveyevo (Russian: Матвеево) is a rural locality (a settlement) in Nyuksenskoye Rural Settlement, Nyuksensky District, Vologda Oblast, Russia. The population was 482 as of 2002. There are 8 streets.

== Geography ==
Matveyevo is located 40 km northeast of Nyuksenitsa (the district's administrative centre) by road. Ozerki is the nearest rural locality.
