= Zaglubotskaya =

Zaglubotskaya Заглубоцкая
- Village
- Location within Vologda Oblast Location within Russia
- Coordinates: 60°11′N 44°37′E
- Country: Russia
- Region: Vologda Oblast
- District: Nyuksensky District
- Time zone: UTC+3:00

Zaglubotskaya (Russian: Заглубоцкая) is a rural locality (a village) in Gorodishchenskoye Rural Settlement, Nyuksensky District, Vologda Oblast, Russia. The population was 9 as of 2002.

== Geography ==
Zaglubotskaya is located 55 km southeast of Nyuksenitsa (the district's administrative centre) by road. Zadny Dvor is the nearest rural locality.
