= Oleshkovka =

Oleshkovka Олешковка
- Settlement
- Location within Vologda Oblast Location within Russia
- Coordinates: 60°24′N 44°17′E
- Country: Russia
- Region: Vologda Oblast
- District: Nyuksensky District
- Time zone: UTC+3:00

Oleshkovka (Russian: Олешковка) is a rural locality (a settlement) in Nyuksenskoye Rural Settlement, Nyuksensky District, Vologda Oblast, Russia. The population was 12 as of 2010.

== Geography ==
Oleshkovka is located 19 km east of Nyuksenitsa (the district's administrative centre) by road. Dunay is the nearest rural locality.
