= Fedkovskaya =

Fedkovskaya Федьковская
- Village
- Location within Vologda Oblast Location within Russia
- Coordinates: 60°12′N 44°16′E
- Country: Russia
- Region: Vologda Oblast
- District: Nyuksensky District
- Time zone: UTC+3:00

Fedkovskaya (Russian: Федьковская) is a rural locality (a village) in Gorodishchenskoye Rural Settlement, Nyuksensky District, Vologda Oblast, Russia. The population was 34 as of 2002.

== Geography ==
Fedkovskaya is located 45 km south of Nyuksenitsa (the district's administrative centre) by road. Verkhneye Kamennoye is the nearest rural locality.
