= Aleksandr Borisov (painter) =

Russian painter

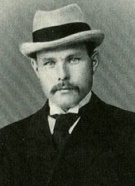
- Born: Aleksandr Alekseyevich Borisov; 14 November 1866; Gluboky Ruchey, Krasnoborsky District, Arkhangelsk Oblast, Russia
- Died: 17 August 1934 (aged 67); Gorodishchenskaya, Russian SFSR, Soviet Union

Aleksandr Alekseyevich Borisov (Russian: Александр Алексеевич Борисов; 14 November [O.S. 2 November] 1866 – 17 August 1934) was a Russian painter notable for his Arctic landscapes.

== Biography ==
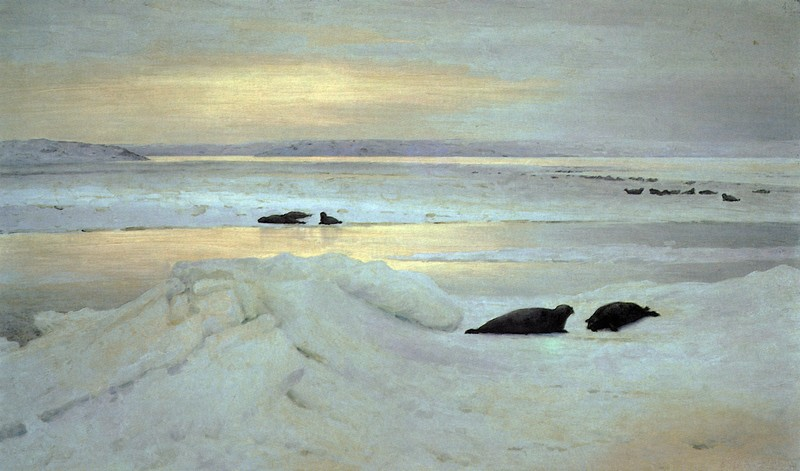
Polar night in the Spring, 1897, the Tretyakov Gallery, Moscow

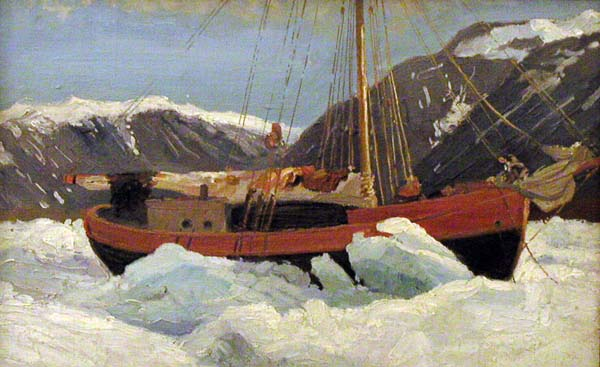
Mechta Yacht (A ship in the ice), 1899, Arctic Museum, Arkhangelsk. Mechta was the ship built for the 1900 polar expedition and brought Borisov and his team to Novaya Zemlya.

Borisov was born in the village of Gluboky Ruchey in the north of Russia, now located in the Krasnoborsky District of the Arkhangelsk Oblast. He was one of four children in the peasant family of Aleksey Yegorovich Borisov and Matryona Nazarovna Borisova. He spent his adolescence in the Solovetsky Monastery in the White Sea where he studied icon painting. In 1886, he obtained a fellowship to continue his studies at the art school in Saint Petersburg. In 1888 he enrolled as a student into the Imperial Academy of Arts. Borisov studied there under landscape painters Ivan Shishkin and Arkhip Kuindzhi and graduated in 1892. In the academy, he decided to devote his career to painting Arctic landscapes. For the Russian Arctic, Borisov was the pioneer of the genre.

In 1894, he accompanied the finance minister, Sergei Witte, to the Kola Peninsula. In 1896, Borisov travelled to the coasts of the White Sea and the Barents Sea, and then joined a scientific expedition to visit Novaya Zemlya. It was during this expedition that he became familiar with the local Nenets people, who taught him survival skills and using Nenets Herding Laika as sled dogs. In 1887, he held an exhibition of his works painted during these travels. The exhibition was acclaimed by the art critics and fellow artists, including Ilya Repin, and several works of Borisov were bought by Sergei Tretyakov for his art collection which later became the Tretyakov Gallery.

In 1900, Borisov organized his third and last Arctic expedition, during which he spent a winter in Novaya Zemlya and investigated the eastern coast of the islands. In particular, he made a topographic map of Novaya Zemlya, performed meteorogical observation, and collected samples of minerals, plants and animals. In 1901 he returned to mainland Russia. The paintings by Borisov created during the expedition have been exhibited in Saint-Petersburg between 1900 and 1905. The artist also travelled to Europe (Austria, Germany, France, and Great Britain) with his exhibitions, and in 1908 he travelled to the US.

In 1909, Borisov bought a house in the village of Gorodishchenskaya, close to Krasnoborsk. He spent most of his time in the house until his death in 1934. In 1910s, Borisov produced a series of landscapes of areas close to the Northern Dvina. These paintings were shown at his personal exhibition in Saint-Petersburg in 1914 and were generally praised by the art critics. In 1900s and 1910s he published several books which included his accounts on the Arctic travels and his ideas on building the economy of the Russian North, including “At the Samoyed. From Pineda to the Kara Sea.” Borisov was a proponent of the construction of a railway which would link all-year harbors of the Kola Peninsula with the banks of Ob River, and he self-funded a research expedition which took place in 1915 and 1916. (The railroad was built much later and was not based on Borisov's expedition results).

Borisov died in 1934 in his house in Gorodishchenskaya.

A peninsula in the east coast of the Severny Island of Novaya Zemlya is called Borisov Peninsula. Streets in Arkhangelsk, Veliky Ustyug, and Krasnoborsk, and the Arctic Museum in Arkhangelsk have been named after him.
