= Frolovsky =

Frolovsky (masculine), Frolovskaya (feminine), or Frolovskoye (neuter) may refer to:

- Frolovsky District, a district of Volgograd Oblast, Russia
- Frolovsky (rural locality) (Frolovskaya, Frolovskoye), name of several rural localities in Russia
