= Bobrovskoye, Nyuksensky District, Vologda Oblast =

Bobrovskoye Бобровское
- Village
- Location within Vologda Oblast Location within Russia
- Coordinates: 60°28′N 44°46′E
- Country: Russia
- Region: Vologda Oblast
- District: Nyuksensky District
- Time zone: UTC+3:00

Bobrovskoye (Russian: Бобровское) is a rural locality (a village) in Nyuksenskoye Rural Settlement, Nyuksensky District, Vologda Oblast, Russia. The population was 193 as of 2002. There are 5 streets.

== Geography ==
Bobrovskoye is located 61 km northeast of Nyuksenitsa (the district's administrative centre) by road. Zarechye is the nearest rural locality.
