= Verkhovye, Nyuksensky District, Vologda Oblast =

Verkhovye Верховье
- Village
- Location within Vologda Oblast Location within Russia
- Coordinates: 60°12′N 44°04′E
- Country: Russia
- Region: Vologda Oblast
- District: Nyuksensky District
- Time zone: UTC+3:00

Verkhovye (Russian: Верховье) is a rural locality (a village) in Gorodishchenskoye Rural Settlement, Nyuksensky District, Vologda Oblast, Russia. The population was 20 as of 2002.

== Geography ==
Verkhovye is located 58 km southwest of Nyuksenitsa (the district's administrative centre) by road. Kokuyevo is the nearest rural locality.
