= Frolovskaya, Krasnoborsky District, Arkhangelsk Oblast =

Frolovskaya Фроловская
- Village
- Location within Arkhangelsk Oblast Location within Russia
- Coordinates: 61°34′N 45°53′E
- Country: Russia
- Region: Arkhangelsk Oblast
- District: Krasnoborsky District
- Time zone: UTC+3:00

Frolovskaya (Russian: Фроловская) is a rural locality (a village) in Krasnoborsky District, Arkhangelsk Oblast, Russia. The population was 441 as of 2010. There are 7 streets.

== Geography ==
Frolovskaya is located 4 km northwest of Krasnoborsk (the district's administrative centre) by road. Kalinka-Gridinskaya is the nearest rural locality.
