= Uftyuga (Northern Dvina) =

Uftyuga Russian: Уфтюга

Location
- Country: Russia

Physical characteristics
- Mouth: Northern Dvina
  - coordinates: 61°33′12″N 46°13′38″E
- Length: 236 km (147 mi)
- Basin size: 6,300 km^{2} (2,400 sq mi)
- Discharge
  - average: 37.5 m^{3}/s (1,320 cu ft/s)

Basin features
- Progression: Northern Dvina→ White Sea

The Northern Dvina River basin

The Uftyuga (Russian: Уфтюга) is a river in Krasnoborsky District of Arkhangelsk Oblast in Russia. It is a right tributary of the Northern Dvina. The river is 236 kilometres (147 mi) long. The area of its basin is 6,300 square kilometres (2,400 sq mi). The Uftyuga freezes in mid-October to early November and stays under the ice until mid-April to early May. Its main tributary is the Lakhoma (right).

The source of the Uftyuga is on the border between Krasnoborsky and Lensky Districts. The river flows south-west. The biggest settlements on the river are Kulikovo, Verkhnyaya Uftyuga, and Beryozonavolok. At its mouth, the Uftyuga flows into the Peschany Poloy, a branch of the Northern Dvina to the east of its main course. The Peschany Poloy then joins the Northern Dvina nearly opposite Krasnoborsk (which is on the left bank).

The State Water Register of Russia lists 72 kilometres (45 mi) of the river's lower course, from Kulikovo downstream, as navigable.
