= Levash, Nyuksensky District, Vologda Oblast =

Levash Леваш
- Settlement
- Location within Vologda Oblast Location within Russia
- Coordinates: 60°31′N 44°53′E
- Country: Russia
- Region: Vologda Oblast
- District: Nyuksensky District
- Time zone: UTC+3:00

Levash (Russian: Леваш) is a rural locality (a settlement) in Vostrovskoye Rural Settlement, Nyuksensky District, Vologda Oblast, Russia. The population was 375 as of 2002. There are 11 streets.

== Geography ==
Levash is located 60 km northeast of Nyuksenitsa (the district's administrative centre) by road. Zabolotye is the nearest rural locality.
