= Gorodishchenskaya =

Gorodishchenskaya Городищенская
- Village
- Location within Arkhangelsk Oblast Location within Russia
- Coordinates: 61°32′N 46°01′E
- Country: Russia
- Region: Arkhangelsk Oblast
- District: Krasnoborsky District
- Time zone: UTC+3:00

Gorodishchenskaya (Russian: Городищенская) is a rural locality (a village) in Telegovskoye Rural Settlement of Krasnoborsky District, Arkhangelsk Oblast, Russia. The population was 119 as of 2010.

== Geography ==
Gorodishchenskaya is located 5 km southeast of Krasnoborsk (the district's administrative centre) by road. Yershevskaya is the nearest rural locality.
