= Verkhnyaya Uftyuga =

Verkhnyaya Uftyuga Верхняя Уфтюга
- Village
- Location within Arkhangelsk Oblast Location within Russia
- Coordinates: 61°38′N 46°37′E
- Country: Russia
- Region: Arkhangelsk Oblast
- District: Krasnoborsky District
- Time zone: UTC+3:00

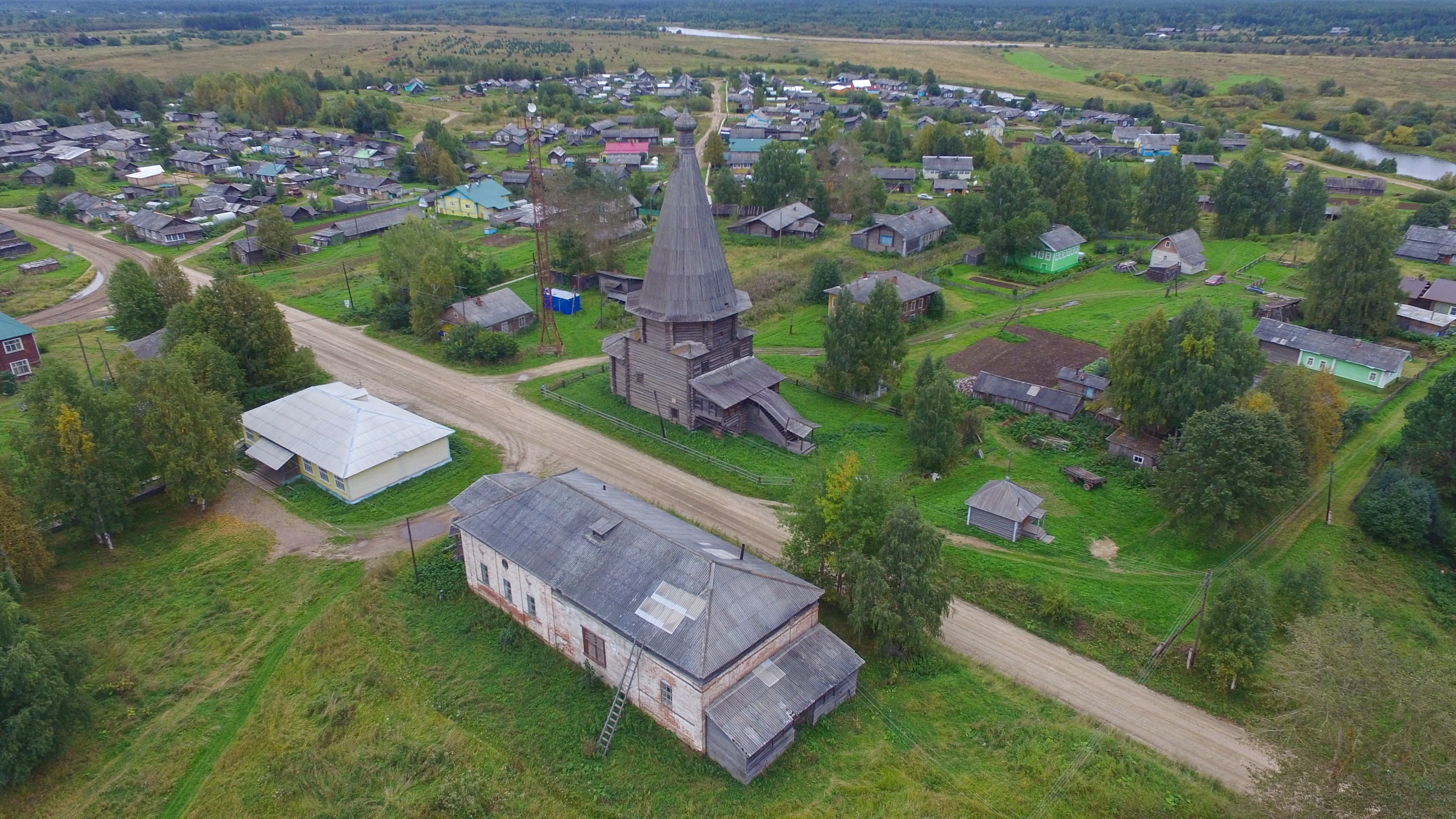
The Churches of St. Demetrius of Thessaloniki and the Trinity in Verkhnyaya Uftyuga

Verkhnyaya Uftyuga (Russian: Верхняя Уфтюга) is a rural locality (a village) and the administrative center of Verkhneuftyugskoye Rural Settlement of Krasnoborsky District, Arkhangelsk Oblast, Russia. The population was 319 as of 2010. There are 8 streets.

== Geography ==
Verkhnyaya Uftyuga is located on the Severnaya Dvina River, 48 km east of Krasnoborsk (the district's administrative centre) by road. Andriyanovo is the nearest rural locality.
