= Frolovskoye, Vologda Oblast =

Frolovskoye Фроловское
- Village
- Location within Vologda Oblast Location within Russia
- Coordinates: 59°02′N 40°08′E
- Country: Russia
- Region: Vologda Oblast
- District: Vologodsky District
- Time zone: UTC+3:00

Frolovskoye (Russian: Фроловское) is a rural locality (a village) in Markovskoye Rural Settlement, Vologodsky District, Vologda Oblast, Russia. The population was 2 as of 2002.

== Geography ==
Frolovskoye is located 28 km southeast of Vologda (the district's administrative centre) by road. Neverovskoye is the nearest rural locality.
