= Ust-Sysolsky Uyezd =

Ust-Sysolsky Uyezd (Russian: Усть-Сысольский уезд) was one of the subdivisions of the Vologda Governorate of the Russian Empire. It was situated in the eastern part of the governorate. Its administrative centre was Ust-Sysolsk (present-day Syktyvkar). In terms of present-day administrative borders, the territory of Ust-Sysolsky Uyezd is part of the Komi Republic.

== Demographics ==
At the time of the Russian Empire Census of 1897, Ust-Sysolsky Uyezd had a population of 89,840. Of these, 92.3% spoke Komi-Zyryan and 7.6% Russian as their native language.
