= Levash, Totemsky District, Vologda Oblast =

Levash Леваш
- Village
- Location within Vologda Oblast Location within Russia
- Coordinates: 60°06′N 43°42′E
- Country: Russia
- Region: Vologda Oblast
- District: Totemsky District
- Time zone: UTC+3:00

Levash (Russian: Леваш) is a rural locality (a village) in Medvedevskoye Rural Settlement, Totemsky District, Vologda Oblast, Russia. The population was 25 as of 2002.

== Geography ==
Levash is located 78 km northeast of Totma (the district's administrative centre) by road. Igmas is the nearest rural locality.
