= Frolovskoye, Vladimir Oblast =

Frolovskoye Фроловское
- Selo
- Location within Vladimir Oblast Location within Russia
- Coordinates: 56°29′N 39°29′E
- Country: Russia
- Region: Vladimir Oblast
- District: Yuryev-Polsky District
- Time zone: UTC+3:00

Frolovskoye (Russian: Фроловское) is a rural locality (a selo) in Krasnoselskoye Rural Settlement, Yuryev-Polsky District, Vladimir Oblast, Russia. The population was 148 as of 2010.

== Geography ==
Frolovskoye is located 12 km west of Yuryev-Polsky (the district's administrative centre) by road. Yelokh is the nearest rural locality.
