= Yarensky Uyezd =

Places in russia

Yarensky Uyezd (Russian: Яренский уезд) was one of the subdivisions of the Vologda Governorate of the Russian Empire. It was situated in the northern part of the governorate. Its administrative centre was Yarensk.

== Demographics ==
At the time of the Russian Empire Census of 1897, Yarensky Uyezd had a population of 172,187. Of these, 68.9% spoke Komi-Zyryan and 30.9% Russian as their native language.
