= Velikoustyuzhsky Uyezd =

Velikoustyuzhsky Uyezd (Russian: Великоустюжский уезд) was one of the subdivisions of the Vologda Governorate of the Russian Empire. It was situated in the central part of the governorate. Its administrative centre was Veliky Ustyug.

== Demographics ==
At the time of the Russian Empire Census of 1897, Velikoustyuzhsky Uyezd had a population of 144,370. Of these, 99.8% spoke Russian as their native language.
