= Frolovsky, Karachevsky District, Bryansk Oblast =

Frolovsky Фроловский
- Settlement
- Location within Bryansk Oblast Location within Russia
- Coordinates: 53°07′N 34°39′E
- Country: Russia
- Region: Bryansk Oblast
- District: Karachevsky District
- Time zone: UTC+3:00

Frolovsky (Russian: Фроловский) is a rural locality (a settlement) in Karachevsky District, Bryansk Oblast, Russia. The population was 1 as of 2013. There is 1 street.

== Geography ==
Frolovsky is located 38 km west of Karachev (the district's administrative centre) by road. Nikultsevy dvory is the nearest rural locality.
