= Verkhovye, Kaduysky District, Vologda Oblast =

Verkhovye Верховье
- Village
- Location within Vologda Oblast Location within Russia
- Coordinates: 59°12′N 36°57′E
- Country: Russia
- Region: Vologda Oblast
- District: Kaduysky District
- Time zone: UTC+3:00

Verkhovye (Russian: Верховье) is a rural locality (a village) in Semizerye Rural Settlement, Kaduysky District, Vologda Oblast, Russia. The population was 10 as of 2002.

== Geography ==
Verkhovye is located 14 km northwest of Kaduy (the district's administrative centre) by road. Kryltsovo is the nearest rural locality.
