= Frolovskaya, Vologda Oblast =

Frolovskaya Фроловская
- Village
- Location within Vologda Oblast Location within Russia
- Coordinates: 60°41′N 42°05′E
- Country: Russia
- Region: Vologda Oblast
- District: Verkhovazhsky District
- Time zone: UTC+3:00

Frolovskaya (Russian: Фроловская) is a rural locality (a village) in Nizhne-Vazhskoye Rural Settlement, Verkhovazhsky District, Vologda Oblast, Russia. The population was 4 as of 2002.

== Geography ==
Frolovskaya is located 7 km southeast of Verkhovazhye (the district's administrative centre) by road. Klykovo is the nearest rural locality.
