= Vologda Governorate =

1796–1929 unit of Russia

Coordinates: 60°N 40°E

Vologda Governorate Вологодская губерния
- Governorate of the Russian Empire, Russian Republic, Soviet Russia
- 1796–1929
- Coat of arms

- Location in the Russian Empire
- Capital: Vologda
- Area
  - (1897): 40,211.2 km^{2} (15,525.6 sq mi)
- Population
  - (1897): 1,341,785
- History
  - Established: 1796
  - Disestablished: 14 January 1929
- Political subdivisions: uyezds: 10 (1918)
Preceded by	Succeeded by
Vologda Viceroyalty	Northern Krai

Vologda Governorate (Russian: Вологодская губерния, romanized: Vologodskaya guberniya), also known as the Government of Vologda, was an administrative-territorial unit (guberniya) of the Russian Empire and the Russian SFSR, which existed from 1796 until 1929. Its administrative center was in the city of Vologda.

The area of the governorate is currently split between Arkhangelsk, Vologda, Kirov, and Kostroma Oblasts, and the Komi Republic.

Vologda Governorate was officially created in 1796 from the disbanded Vologda Viceroyalty (namestnichestvo) which was split between Arkhangelsk Viceroyalty and Vologda Viceroyalty just before the new administrative reform.

== Administrative division ==
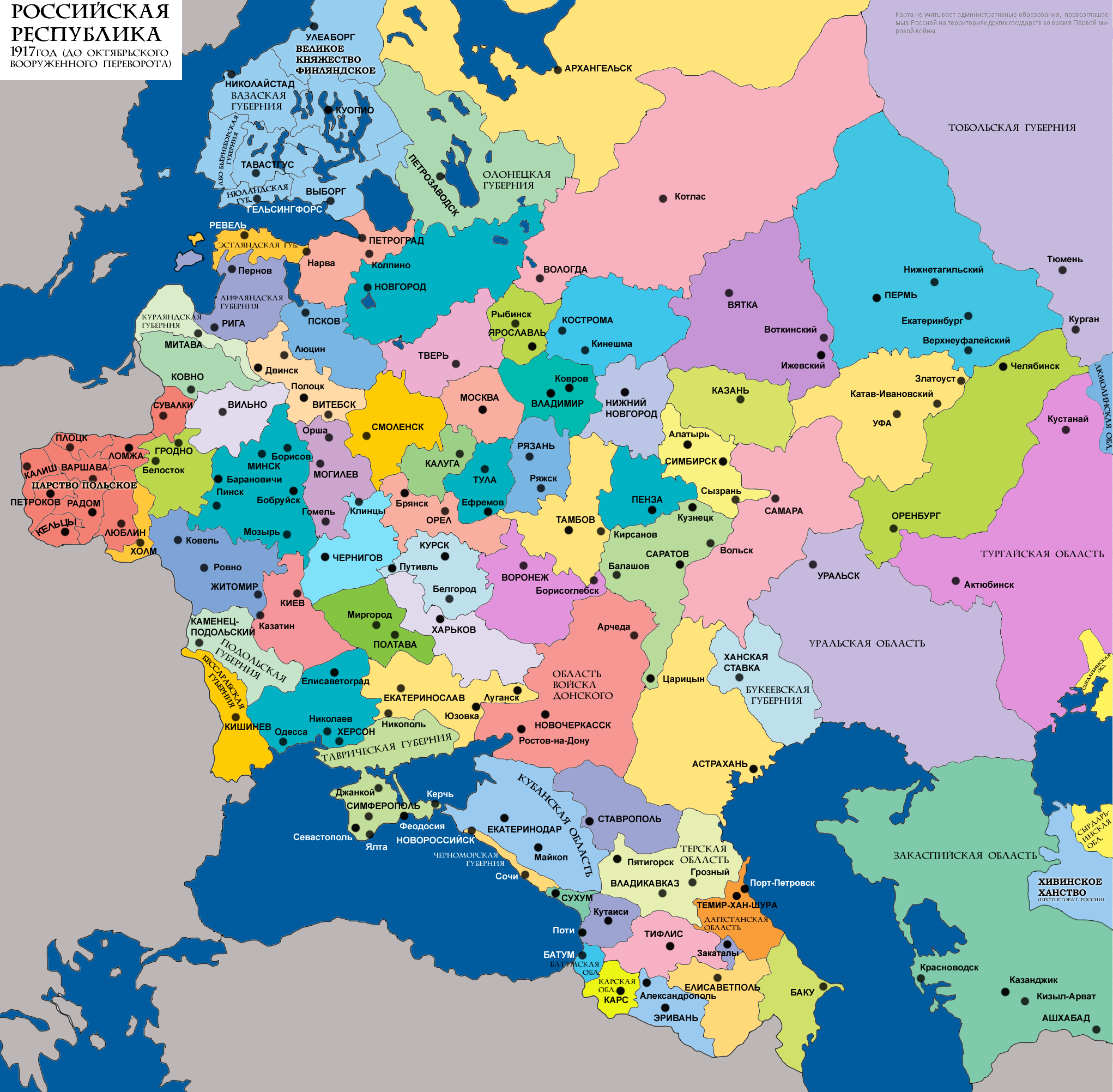
The European part of the Russian Republic in 1917. Vologda Governorate is shown as the pink area in the top right part of the map.

It was administered by 10 uyezds (the administrative centers, which all had the town status, are given in parentheses),

- Velsky Uyezd (Velsk);
- Vologodsky Uyezd (Vologda);
- Gryazovetsky Uyezd (Gryazovets);
- Kadnikovsky Uyezd (Kadnikov);
- Nikolsky Uyezd (Nikolsk);
- Solvychegodsky Uyezd (Solvychegodsk);
- Totemsky Uyezd (Totma);
- Ust-Sysolsky Uyezd (Ust-Sysolsk);
- Velikoustyuzhsky Uyezd (Veliky Ustyug);
- Yarensky Uyezd (Yarensk).

Three towns had a special status: Krasnoborsk, Lalsk, and Verkhovazhskiy Posad.

The Vologda Governorate covered a total area of 402,112 square kilometres (155,256 mi^{2}), and had a population of 1,341,785 according to the 1897 Russian Empire census. The governorate bordered Arkhangelsk Governorate in the north, Tobolsk Governorate in the northeast, Perm and Vyatka Governorates in the southeast, Kostroma and Yaroslavl Governorates in the south, Novgorod Governorate in the west, and Olonets Governorate in the northwest. The two eastern uyezds, Ust-Sysolsky Uyezd (92%) and Yarensky Uyezd, were predominantly populated by the Komi peoples (Zyrian), while in the whole governorate the Komi accounted for less than 10%.

== History ==
Historically the region belonged to what is known as the Great Perm later being incorporated into the Novgorod Republic after the disintegration of the Kievan Rus. With the annexation of Novgorod, Vologda also became part of the Grand Duchy of Moscow. Among the first monks who permanently established Christianity in the region was Saint Stephen of Perm, born in the city of Ustyug sometime in 1340/45. In 1383 he became the first bishop of the newly established Perm Eparchy. In the course of the administrative reform carried out in 1708 by Peter the Great, the area was included into Archangelgorod Governorate. In 1780, Archangelgorod Governorate, with the center in Arkhangelsk, was abolished and transformed to Vologda Viceroyalty. The viceroyalty was subdivided into three oblasts: Vologda, Veliky Ustyug, and Arkhangelsk. March 26, 1784 Arkhangelsk Oblast was split off and established as Arkhangelsk Viceroyalty. In 1796, Vologda Viceroyalty was transformed into Vologda Governorate with the seat in the city of Vologda.

From 1872 to 1906 the construction of railroads connected the governorate with the rest of the Russian Empire.

On July 24, 1918, the People's Commissariat for Internal Affairs of the Russian Soviet Federative Socialist Republic established Northern Dvina Governorate. The area of the governorate included five uyezds of Vologda Governorate: Nikolsky, Solvychegodsky, Ust-Sysolsky, Velikoustyuzhsky, and Yarensky Uyezds.

In 1918, Petrograd, Novgorod, Pskov, Olonets, Arkhangelsk, Cherepovets, and Northern Dvina Governorates decided to merge into the Union of Northern Oblast Communes. The union was, however, short-lived and was abolished in 1919.

On April 30, 1919 Kargopolsky Uyezd, formerly of Olonets Governorate, was transferred to Vologda Governorate. In November 1923, several volosts of Vologodsky Uyezd were merged into Sverdlovsky District which in 1924 was augmented with several volosts of neighboring Kadnikovsky Uyezd. On August 7, 1924, Gryazovetsky Uyezd was disestablished and merged into Vologodsky Uyezd. In 1928, Sverdlovsky District was reorganized into volosts and incorporated into Kadnikovsky Uyezd. Thus, in 1928 Vologda Governorate consisted of five uyezds: Kadnikovsky, Kargopolsky, Totemsky, Velsky, and Vologodsky.

On January 14, 1929, by the All-Russian Central Executive Committee three governorates (Arkhangelsk, Vologda, and Northern Dvina) and the Komi-Zyryan Autonomous Oblast were merged into Northern Krai with the administrative center located in Arkhangelsk.

== Demographics ==
=== Principal towns ===
Russian Census of 1897 gave the following localities with population above 1,000 people (In bold, towns with population above 10,000 are indicated),

- Vologda – 27 705 (of them Russian population – 26 798);
- **Veliky Ustyug** – 11 137 (Russian – 10 954);
- Totma – 4 947 (Russian – 4 902);
- Ust-Sysolsk – 4 464 (Komi – 3 699, Russian – 731);
- Gryazovets – 3 205 (Russian – 3 188);
- Nikolsk – 2 553 (Russian – 2 509);
- Kadnikov – 2 406 (Russian – 2 385);
- Velsk – 1 989 (Russian – 1 954);
- Solvychegodsk – 1 788 (Russian – 1 762);
- Lalsk – 1 124 (Russian – 1 123).

=== Language ===
According to the Imperial census of 1897, the following languages were spoken in Vologda Governorate.

Language	Number	percentage (%)	males	females
Russian	1,224,138	91.23		
Komi	114,966	8.57		
Persons, that did not identified their native language		N/A		
Other	2 681	0.20		

=== Religion ===
According to the Imperial census of 1897, almost all the population were Eastern Orthodox with a small minority of Old Believers. Other religions in the governorate were much less common (not exceeding 500).

Religion	Number	percentage (%)	males	females
Eastern Orthodox	1,332,277	99.29		
Other (Old Believers)	9 508	0.71		

== Governors ==
The administration of the governorate was performed by a governor. The governors of Vologda Governorate were

- 1798–1800 Fyodor Karlovich Norman, acting governor;
- 1800 Dmitry Borisovich Tolstoy, acting governor;
- 1800 Vasily Petrovich Putimtsev, acting governor;
- 1800 Vasily Ivanovich Lisanevich (never took the office);
- 1800 – 1806 Alexey Alexeyevich Goryainov;
- 1806–1809 Karl Ivanovich Lineman;
- 1809–1810 Vasily Ivanovich Voyeykov;
- 1810–1814 Nikolay Ivanovich Barsh;
- 1814–1818 Ivan Ivanovich Vinter (Winter);
- 1818–1821 Ivan Ivanovich Popov;
- 1821–1834 Nikolay Petrovich Brusilov;
- 1834–1836 Stepan Ivanovich Kuzmin;
- 1836–1840 Dmitry Nikolayevich Bologovsky;
- 1841–1850 Stepan Grigoryevich Volkhovsky;
- 1851–1854 Ivan Vasilyevich Romanus;
- 1854–1860 Filipp Semyonovich Stoinsky;
- 1860–1861 Vladimir Filipovich Pfeller;
- 1861–1878 Stanislav Fadeevich Khominsky;
- 1878–1879 Mikhail Petrovich Daragan;
- 1880–1882 Leonid Ivanovich Cherkasov;
- 1882 Alexander Nikolayevich Mosolov;
- 1882–1892 Mikhail Nikolayevich Kormilitsyn;
- 1892–1894 Vladimir Zakharovich Kolenko;
- 1894–1898 Iosif Yakovlevich Dunin-Barkovsky;
- 1898–1900 Alexander Alexandrovich Musin-Pushkin;
- 1901–1902 Leonid Mikhaylovich Knyazev;
- 1902–1906 Alexander Alexandrovich Lodyzhensky;
- 1906–1910 Alexey Nikolayevich Khvostov;
- 1910–1913 Mikhail Nikolayevich Shramchenko;
- 1913 Yakov Dmitrievich Bologovsky;
- 1914–1915 Viktor Alexandrovich Lopukhin;
- 1916 Vladimir Mikhaylovich Strakhov;
- 1916–1917 Alexander Viktorovich Arapov.
