= Krasnoborsky District =

Krasnoborsky District Красноборский район (Russian)
- District
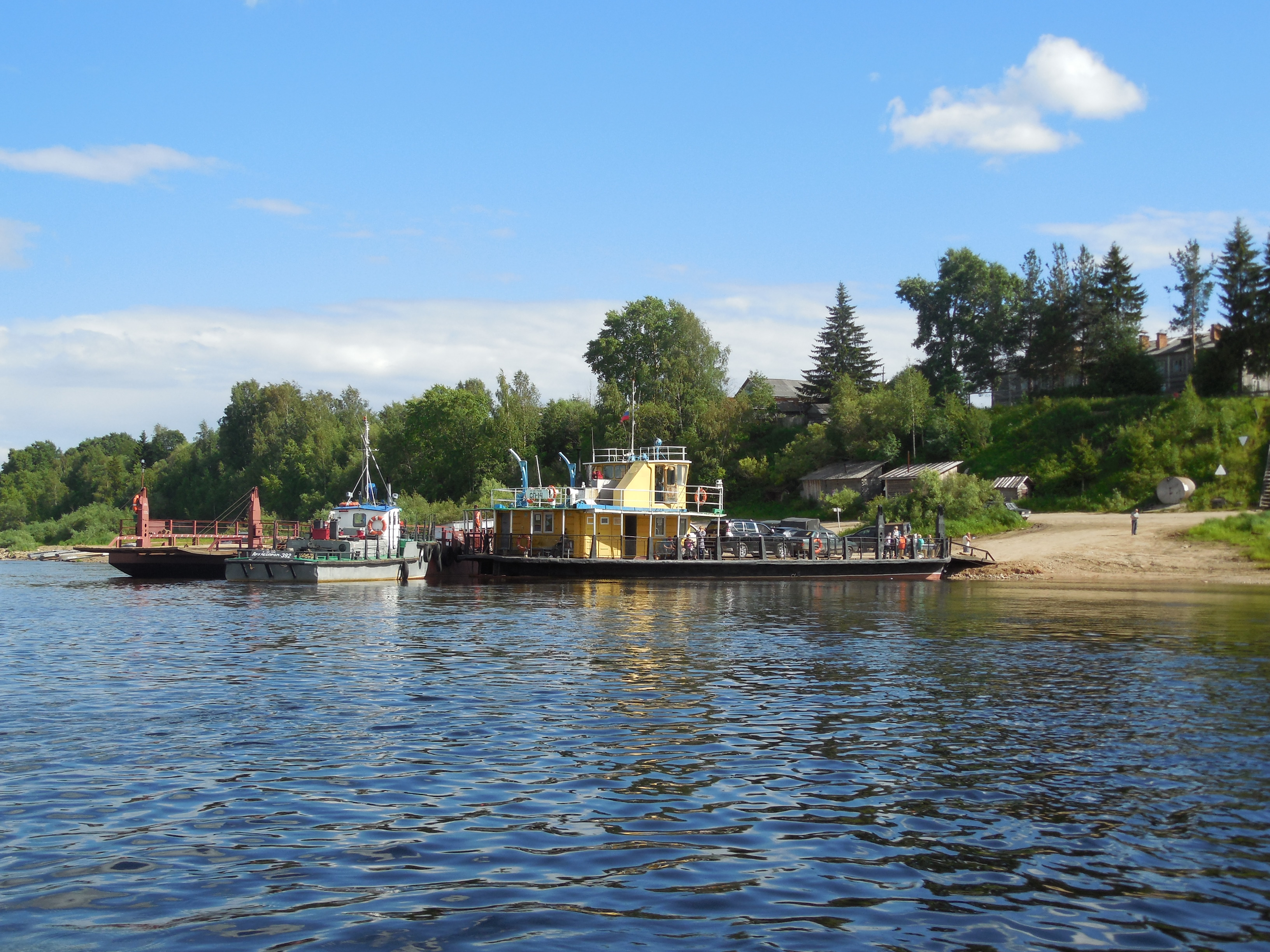
- Boat crossing, Krasnoborsky District

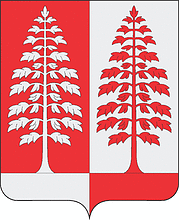
- Flag Coat of arms
- Location of Krasnoborsky District in Arkhangelsk Oblast
- Coordinates: 61°33′N 45°56′E
- Country: Russia
- Federal subject: Arkhangelsk Oblast
- Established: April 10, 1924
- Administrative center: Krasnoborsk

Area
  - Total: 9,500 km^{2} (3,700 sq mi)

Population (2010 Census)
  - Total: 13,815
  - Density: 1.5/km^{2} (3.8/sq mi)
  - Urban: 0%
  - Rural: 100%

Administrative structure
  - Administrative divisions: 10 selsoviet
  - Inhabited localities: 341 rural localities

Municipal structure
  - Municipally incorporated as: Krasnoborsky Municipal District
  - Municipal divisions: 0 urban settlements, 7 rural settlements
- Time zone: UTC+3 (MSK)
- OKTMO ID: 11630000
- Website: http://krasnoborskiy.ru/

Krasnoborsky District (Russian: Краснобо́рский райо́н) is an administrative district (raion), one of the twenty-one in Arkhangelsk Oblast, Russia. Municipally, it is incorporated as Krasnoborsky Municipal District. It is located in the southeast of the oblast and borders with Verkhnetoyemsky District in the north, Udorsky District of the Komi Republic in the northeast, Lensky District in the east, Kotlassky District in the south, and with Ustyansky District in the west. Its administrative center is the rural locality (a selo) of Krasnoborsk. District's population: 13,815 (2010 census); 17,144 (2002 census); 20,491 (1989 Soviet census). The population of Krasnoborsk accounts for 34.5% of the district's total population.

== History ==
The area was populated by speakers of Uralic languages and then colonized by the Novgorod Republic. After the fall of Novgorod, the area became a part of the Grand Duchy of Moscow. Krasnoborsk was founded in 1602 as Krasny Bor. From the 17th century, Krasny Bor held an annual trade fair.

In the course of the administrative reform carried out in 1708 by Peter the Great, the area was included into Archangelgorod Governorate. In 1780, the governorate was abolished and transformed into Vologda Viceroyalty. Simultaneously, Krasny Bor was renamed Krasnoborsk, granted town status, and Krasnoborsky Uyezd was established. In 1796, the uyezd was abolished, and its territory was included into Solvychegodsky Uyezd of Vologda Governorate. In 1918, the area was transferred to the newly established Northern Dvina Governorate and in 1924 the uyezds were abolished in favor of the new divisions, the districts (raions). Krasnoborsky District was established on April 10, 1924.

In the following years, the district remained within the same borders, but the first-level administrative division of Russia kept changing. In 1929, Northern Dvina Governorate was merged into Northern Krai, which in 1936 was transformed into Northern Oblast. In 1937, Northern Oblast was split into Arkhangelsk Oblast and Vologda Oblast. Krasnoborsky District remained in Arkhangelsk Oblast ever since.

From 1924 to 1959, Cherevkovsky District existed, with its administrative center located in Cherevkovo, initially in Northern Dvina Governorate. On September 11, 1959, the district was abolished and split between Krasnoborsky, Verkhnetoyemsky, and Ustyansky Districts; the administrative center Cherevkovo became a part of Krasnoborsky District.

== Location and geography ==
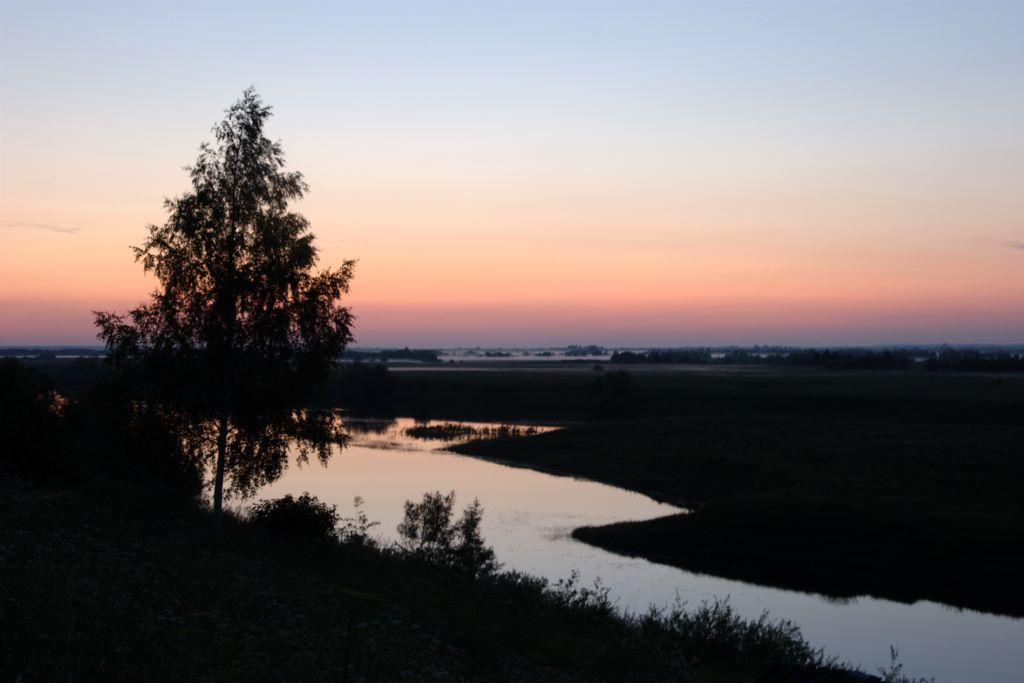
Lake Kotishche in the Northern Dvina floodplain, Cherevkovo

The district is located on both banks of the Northern Dvina. A major part of the district belongs to the basins of the Northern Dvina and its major tributaries. The main (right-hand) Northern Dvina tributary which flows through the district is the Uftyuga. Minor parts of the district belong to the basins of other major tributaries of the Northern Dvina: the Ustya (southwest) and the Pinega (northeast). The source of the Pinega is located in Verkhnetoyemsky District; however, the Pinega starts at the confluence of the Belaya and the Chyornaya, both of which have their sources in Krasnoborsky District. A very small area in the northeast of the district, adjacent to the Komi Republic, belongs to the basin of the Vashka River, a tributary of the Mezen (not of the Northern Dvina basin). The whole area of the district lies in the drainage basin of the White Sea.

Almost the whole of the district is covered by coniferous forests (taiga). The exception are the meadows in the floodplains.

== Divisions ==
=== Administrative divisions ===
Administratively, the district is divided into ten selsoviets. The following selsoviets have been established (the administrative centers are given in parentheses):

- Alexeyevsky (Krasnoborsk)
- Belosludsky (Bolshaya Sludka)
- Beryozonavolotsky (Beryozonavolok)
- Cherevkovsky (Cherevkovo)
- Kulikovsky (Kulikovo)
- Lyakhovsky (Yemelyanovskaya)
- Novoshinsky (Komsomolsky)
- Permogorsky (Bolshaya)
- Telegovsky (Yershevskaya)
- Verkhneuftyugsky (Verkhnyaya Uftyuga)

=== Municipal divisions ===
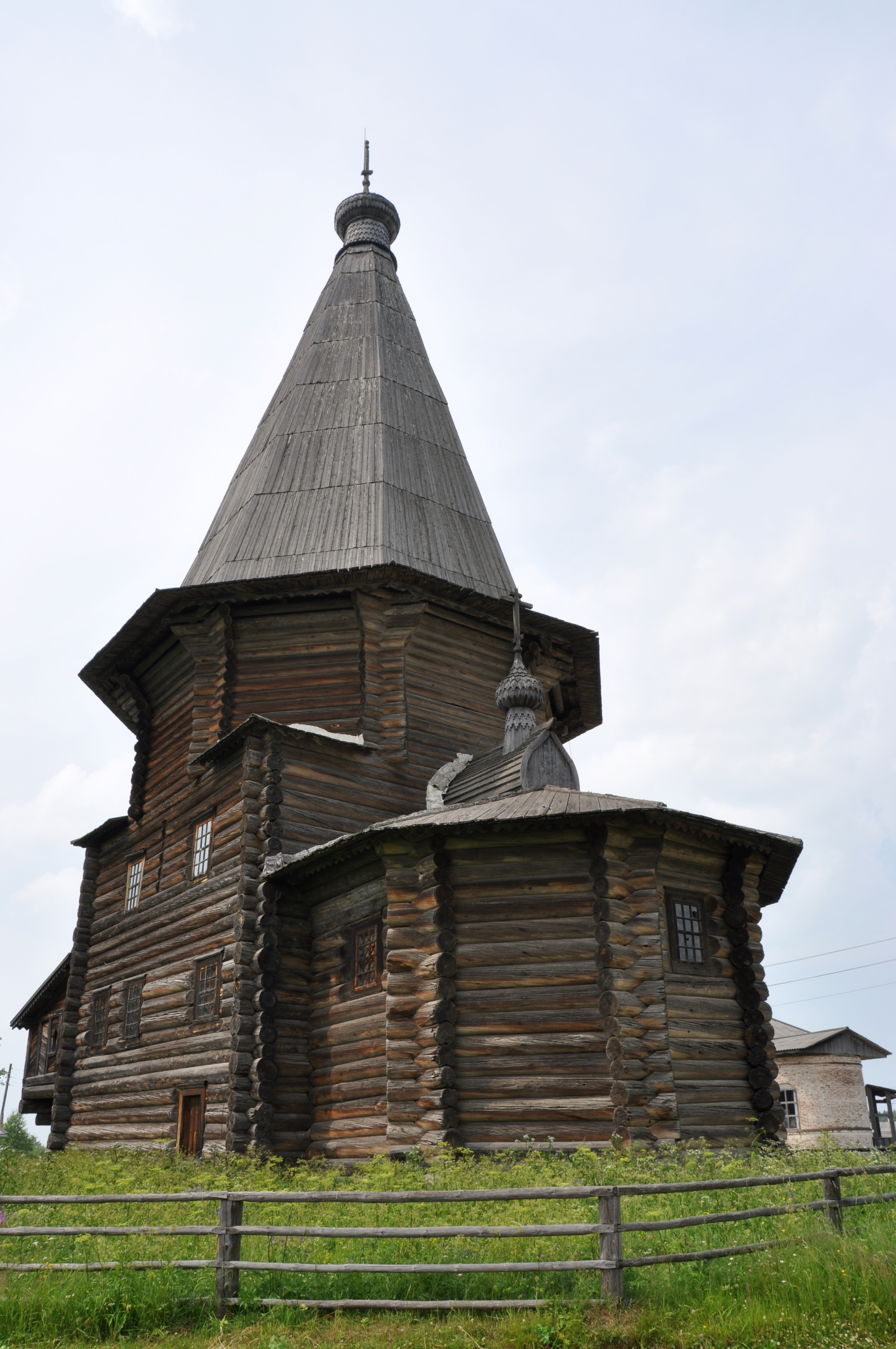
St. Demetrius Church in Verkhnyaya Uftyuga

Municipally, the district is divided into seven rural settlements (the administrative centers are given in parentheses):

- Alexeyevskoye Rural Settlement (Krasnoborsk)
- Belosludskoye Rural Settlement (Bolshaya Sludka)
- Cherevkovskoye Rural Settlement (Cherevkovo)
- Kulikovskoye Rural Settlement (Kulikovo)
- Permogorskoye Rural Settlement (Bolshaya)
- Telegovskoye Rural Settlement (Yershevskaya)
- Verkhneuftyugskoye Rural Settlement (Verkhnyaya Uftyuga)

== Economy ==
=== Industry ===
The basis of the economy of the district is timber industry, which is more developed on the left bank of the Northern Dvina than on the right bank. Food industry is also present.

=== Agriculture ===
In 2008, there were twenty-four farms of various sizes in the district. These produced meat (beef and pork), milk, cereals, and potatoes. There were also two posts buying wild berries and mushrooms from the gatherers.

=== Transportation ===
The Northern Dvina is navigable, although there is no regular passenger navigation.

There is a road connecting Kotlas and Arkhangelsk which passes through Krasnoborsk. There are also local roads. There is regular passenger bus traffic over the district, and also from Krasnoborsk to Arkhangelsk.

== Education ==
There are three high schools in the district (located in Krasnoborsk, Cherevkovo, and Verkhnyaya Uftyuga), and six basic (providing nine-year education) and elementary schools/ There is also a technical college in Krasnoborsk which was founded in 1911 and mostly caters to the timber industry.

== Culture and recreation ==
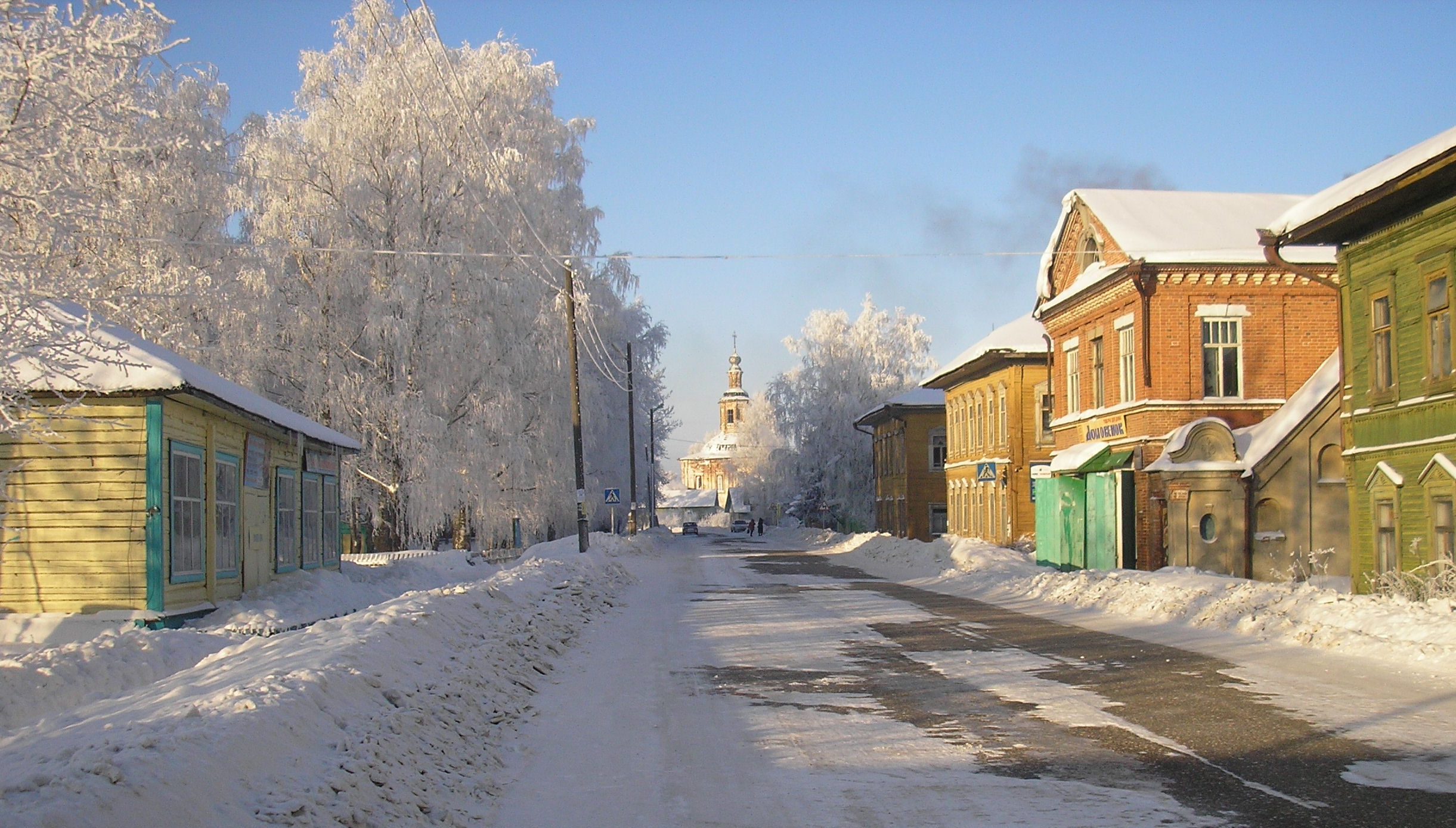
The selo of Cherevkovo

The district contains fourteen objects classified as cultural and historical heritage by Russian Federal law, and additionally sixty-three objects classified as cultural and historical heritage of local importance. Most of these are wooden churches and wooden rural houses built prior to 1917.

The only state museum in the district is Sergey Tupitsyn Museum of History and Art (founded in 1958) with the main building in Krasnoborsk and a branch in the selo of Cherevkovo.

Aleksandr Borisov, a Russian landscape painter, had an estate in the village of Gorodishchenskaya, close to Krasnoborsk. He lived there most of his life from 1909, and died in his house in 1934.
