= Solvychegodsky Uyezd =

Solvychegodsky Uyezd (Russian: Сольвычегодский уезд) was one of the subdivisions of the Vologda Governorate of the Russian Empire. It was situated in the northern part of the governorate. Its administrative centre was Solvychegodsk. In terms of present-day administrative borders, the territory of Solvychegodsky Uyezd is divided between the Kotlassky, Krasnoborsky and Verkhnetoyemsky districts of Arkhangelsk Oblast.

== Demographics ==
At the time of the Russian Empire Census of 1897, Solvychegodsky Uyezd had a population of 117,635. Of these, 99.9% spoke Russian as their native language.
