= Krasnoborsk, Arkhangelsk Oblast =

Krasnoborsk Красноборск
- Selo
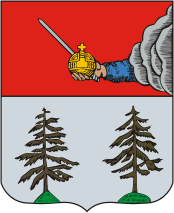
- Coat of arms
- Interactive map of Krasnoborsk
- Location of Krasnoborsk Krasnoborsk (Arkhangelsk Oblast)
- Coordinates: 61°33′N 45°46′E
- Country: Russia
- Federal subject: Arkhangelsk Oblast
- Administrative district: Krasnoborsky District
- Selsoviet: Alexeyevsky Selsoviet

Population (2010 Census)
  - Total: 4,771
  - Estimate (1897): 671 (−85.9%)

Administrative status
  - Capital of: Krasnoborsky District, Alexeyevsky Selsoviet

Municipal status
  - Municipal district: Krasnoborsky Municipal District
  - Rural settlement: Alexeyevskoye Rural Settlement
  - Capital of: Krasnoborsky Municipal District, Alexeyevskoye Rural Settlement
- Time zone: UTC+3 (MSK)
- Postal code: 165430
- Dialing code: +7 81840
- OKTMO ID: 11530000101

Krasnoborsk (Russian: Краснобо́рск) is a rural locality (a selo) and the administrative center of Krasnoborsky District, Arkhangelsk Oblast, Russia, located on the left bank of the Northern Dvina. It also serves as the administrative center of Alexeyevsky Selsoviet, one of the ten selsoviets into which the district is administratively divided. Municipally, it is the administrative center of Alexeyevskoye Rural Settlement in Krasnoborsky Municipal District. Population: 4,771 (2010 census); 5,030 (2002 census); 5,110 (1989 Soviet census).

== History ==
Krasnoborsk was founded in 1602 as Krasny Bor. From 17th century Krasny Bor held an annual trade fair. In 1780, it was renamed Krasnoborsk and was granted town rights as the seat of Krasnoborsky Uyezd in the newly established Vologda Viceroyalty. In 1796, the uyezd was abolished, and Krasnoborsk became a part of the Solvychegodsky Uyezd of the Vologda Governorate. In 1897, the population of Krasnoborsk was 671, and in 1917 it lost the town rights. On 10 April 1924, the Krasnoborsky district was established, at the time as a part of the Northern Dvina Governorate.

== Geography and location ==
Krasnoborsk is located on the left bank of the Northern Dvina, between the confluences of the Nechmezh (south) and Lyabla (north), approximately opposite to the confluence of the Uftyuga, a major tributary of the Northern Dvina.

== Economy ==
=== Industry ===
There is small-scale food industry in Krasnoborsk producing bread and milk products. It is also a regional center of the timber industry.

=== Transportation ===
Northern Dvina is navigable, although there is no regular passenger navigation.

There is a road connecting Kotlas and Arkhangelsk which passes Krasnoborsk, with regular passenger bus traffic from Krasnoborsk to Arkhangelsk and local traffic from Krasnoborsk to the villages of the Krasnoborsky District.

== Culture and recreation ==
The district contains 4 objects classified as cultural and historical heritage of local importance. There is the Trinity Church built in 1812, which is a part of the former Ustye Pogost (ensemble of churches). Another protected heritage building is the Tolubensky House (Gagarin street, 8).

There is Sergey Tupitsyn Museum of History and Art (founded in 1958) with the main building in Krasnoborsk which is actually the only museum in Krasnoborsk District. Sergey Tupitsyn was a school teacher in Krasnoborsk who founded the museum.

Aleksandr Borisov, a Russian landscape painter, had an estate in the village of Gorodishchenskaya, close to Krasnoborsk. He lived there most of his time from 1909, and died in his house in 1934. He is buried in Krasnoborsk, and his grave is classified and protected as a historical monument.
