= Nyuksensky District =

Nyuksensky District Нюксенский район (Russian)
- District
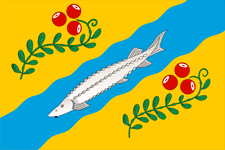
- Flag Coat of arms
- Location of Nyuksensky District in Vologda Oblast
- Coordinates: 60°25′N 44°14′E
- Country: Russia
- Federal subject: Vologda Oblast
- Established: June 10, 1924
- Administrative center: Nyuksenitsa

Area
  - Total: 5,167.42 km^{2} (1,995.15 sq mi)

Population (2010 Census)
  - Total: 9,777
  - Density: 1.892/km^{2} (4.900/sq mi)
  - Urban: 0%
  - Rural: 100%

Administrative structure
  - Administrative divisions: 11 selsoviet
  - Inhabited localities: 138 rural localities

Municipal structure
  - Municipally incorporated as: Nyuksensky Municipal District
  - Municipal divisions: 0 urban settlements, 4 rural settlements
- Time zone: UTC+3 (MSK)
- OKTMO ID: 19636000
- Website: http://nuksenitca.ru/

Nyuksensky District (Russian: Ню́ксенский райо́н) is an administrative and municipal district (raion), one of the twenty-six in Vologda Oblast, Russia. It is located in the northeast of the oblast and borders with Ustyansky District of Arkhangelsk Oblast in the north, Velikoustyugsky District in the east, Kichmengsko-Gorodetsky District in the southeast, Babushkinsky District in the south, Totemsky District in the southwest, and with Tarnogsky District in the west. The area of the district is 5,167.42 square kilometers (1,995.15 sq mi). Its administrative center is the rural locality (a selo) of Nyuksenitsa. District's population: 9,777 (2010 Census); 11,714 (2002 Census); 13,287 (1989 Soviet census). The population of Nyuksenitsa accounts for 43.7% of the district's total population.

== Geography ==
The district is located on both banks of the Sukhona River. It is elongated from north to south and divided by the Sukhona roughly into two equal parts. The major part of the district belongs to the basin of the Sukhona and two of its tributaries: the Uftyuga (left) and the Gorodishna (right). The rivers in the north of the district drain into the Ustya River basin and thus into the basin of the Vaga, a major tributary of the Northern Dvina. Some rivers in the southeast of the district drain into the Kichmenga and the Sharzhenga, left tributaries of the Yug River. The whole district belongs to the basin of the Northern Dvina.

The district is almost completely covered by coniferous forests (taiga). The exception are the meadows in the floodplains.

== History ==
The area was populated by Finnic peoples and then colonized by the Novgorod Republic (Totma) and Vladimir-Suzdal Principality (Veliky Ustyug). The Novgorod merchants used the Sukhona River as one of the main waterways leading to the White Sea and the Pechora. After the fall of Novgorod, the area became a part of the Grand Duchy of Moscow. The village of Bobrovy Yam (currently Bobrovskoye) was mentioned in the chronicles in 1425. Nyuksenitsa was first mentioned in 1619.

In the course of the administrative reform carried out in 1708 by Peter the Great, the area was included into Archangelgorod Governorate. In 1780, the governorate was abolished and transformed into Vologda Viceroyalty. The latter was abolished in 1796, and the part of it which included Nyuksenitsa became Vologda Governorate. It was included into Velikoustyugsky Uyezd. In 1918, the area was transferred to the newly established Northern Dvina Governorate, and in 1924 the uyezds were abolished in favor of the new divisions, the districts (raions).

Nyuksensky District was established on June 10, 1924 and included areas of former Solvychegodsky and Velikoustyugsky Uyezds. On February 27, 1928, it was renamed Sukhonsky District. In 1929, Northern Dvina Governorate was merged into Northern Krai, and Kokshengsky District was established. On July 30, 1931, Sukhonsky and Kokshengsky Districts were merged, and Nyuksensky District was re-established, with the administrative center located in Nyuksenitsa. In 1935, Tarnogsky District was split off from Nyuksensky District. In 1936, Northern Krai was transformed into Northern Oblast, and in 1937, Northern Oblast itself was split into Arkhangelsk Oblast and Vologda Oblast. Nyuksensky District remained in Vologda Oblast ever since.

== Administrative and municipal divisions ==
Rural settlements of Nyuksensky Municipal District (in Russian)

Administratively, the district is divided into eleven selsoviets. Municipally, the district is incorporated as Nyuksensky Municipal District and is divided into four rural settlements. The municipal district includes all of the inhabited localities of the administrative district, with the exception of the settlement of Ilezka, which is municipally a part of Babushkinsky District.

== Economy ==
=== Industry ===
The economy of the district is based on timber production. There is some food industry present, including a milk factory in Nyuksenitsa.

=== Agriculture ===
There is cattle farming in the district, which is still in crisis after the fall in the 1990s.

=== Transportation ===
Nyuksenitsa stands on the road connecting Vologda and Veliky Ustyug, and in Nyuksenitsa the road moves over the bridge from the left bank to the right bank of the Sukhona. Another paved road branches off in Nyuksenitsa northwest to Tarnogsky Gorodok and further to Oktyabrsky in Arkhangelsk Oblast. There is regular passenger bus service on both roads.

The Sukhona is navigable within the district; however, there is no passenger navigation.

Nyuksenitsa has an oil-pumping station in the Baltic Pipeline System.

== Culture and recreation ==
The district contains 130 objects classified as cultural and historical heritage of local importance. Most of these are wooden farm buildings and churches built prior to 1917.

The only state museum in the district is the Nyuksenitsa Regional Museum, located in Nyuksenitsa.

== Controversies ==
=== Dismissal of Yulia Shevtsova ===
Yulia Shevtsova (Russian: Юлия Шевцова), head of the Nyuksensky municipal district, was dismissed in May 2025 following a scandal involving a TikTok video of her 19-year-old daughter, Ksenia. In the video, Ksenia boasted about her mother's position and threatened to send her enemies to a "special military operation," (Russian invasion of Ukraine) prompting public outrage. In the video, the girl is heard in Russian saying: “What’s wrong with you, dumbo? Do you know who my mother is? The mayor! (We’ll send you to the SVO).” The comment was allegedly made during a personal conflict with her boyfriend.

Despite apologies from both Shevtsova and her daughter, Vologda Region Governor Georgy Filimonov condemned the remarks as offensive and incompatible with the region's values, leading to Shevtsova's resignation. Filimonov suggested Shevtsova focus on her daughter's upbringing, recommending nursing courses and a volunteer internship at a military hospital for Ksenia. Shevtsova, born in 1975, had served as head of the district since October 2024, with a background in law and regional administration.
