= Nyuksenitsa =

Nyuksenitsa Нюксеница
- Selo
- Interactive map of Nyuksenitsa
- Location of Nyuksenitsa Nyuksenitsa (Vologda Oblast)
- Coordinates: 60°25′N 44°14′E
- Country: Russia
- Federal subject: Vologda Oblast
- Administrative district: Nyuksensky District
- Selsoviet: Nyuksensky Selsoviet
- Founded: 1619

Population (2010 Census)
  - Total: 4,271
  - Estimate (2021): 4,333 (+1.5%)

Administrative status
  - Capital of: Nyuksensky District, Beryozovsky Selsoviet, Nyuksensky Selsoviet

Municipal status
  - Municipal district: Nyuksensky Municipal District
  - Rural settlement: Nyuksenskoye Rural Settlement
  - Capital of: Nyuksensky Municipal District, Nyuksenskoye Rural Settlement
- Time zone: UTC+3 (MSK)
- Postal code: 161380
- OKTMO ID: 19636444101

Nyuksenitsa (Russian: Ню́ксеница) is a rural locality (a selo) and the administrative center of Nyuksensky District, Vologda Oblast, Russia, located on the left bank of the Sukhona River. It also serves as the administrative center of Beryozovsky and Nyuksensky Selsoviets, two of the eleven selsoviets into which the district is administratively divided. Municipally, it is the administrative center of Nyuksenskoye Rural Settlement. Population: 4,271 (2010 census); 4,407 (2002 census); 4,164 (1989 Soviet census).

== History ==
Nyuksenitsa has been first mentioned in 1619. At the time, the Sukhona was intensively used as a transport waterway, connecting Moscow to Arkhangelsk, till 1703 the main hub of Russian foreign trade. In the 19th century, Nyuksenitsa belonged to Velikoustyugsky Uyezd of Vologda Governorate. In 1918, the area was transferred to the newly established Northern Dvina Governorate, and in 1924 the uyezds were abolished in favor of the new divisions, the districts (raions).

Nyuksensky District was established on June 25, 1924 and included areas of former Solvychegodsky and Velikoustyugsky Uyezds. On February 27, 1928, it was renamed into Sukhonsky District. On July 30, 1931 Sukhonsky and Kokshengsky Districts of the Northern Krai were merged, and Nyuksensky District was re-established, with the administrative center again located in Nyuksenitsa.

== Economy ==
=== Industry ===
In Nyuksenitsa, timber and food industry are present, including a milk factory.

=== Transportation ===
Nyuksenitsa is on the road connecting Vologda and Veliky Ustyug, and in Nyuksenitsa the road moves over the bridge from the left bank to the right bank of the Sukhona. Another paved road branches off in Nyuksenitsa northwest to Tarnogsky Gorodok and further to Oktyabrsky in Arkhangelsk Oblast. There is regular passenger bus service on both roads.

The Sukhona is navigable within the district, however, there is no passenger navigation.

Nyuksenitsa has an oil-pumping station in the Baltic Pipeline System.

== Culture and recreation ==
Nyuksenitsa hosts the District is the Nyuksenitsa Regional Museum.
