= List of rural localities in Arkhangelsk Oblast =

Map of Russia with Arkhangelsk Oblast highlighted; Nenets Autonomous Okrug within the Oblast is highlighted in light red

This is a list of rural localities in Arkhangelsk Oblast, organized by district. It also includes rural localities in Nenets Autonomous Okrug, which is fully within Arkhangelsk Oblast. Nenets Autonomous Okrug only contains one district, Zapolyarny District.

Arkhangelsk Oblast (Russian: Арха́нгельская о́бласть, Arkhangelskaya oblast) is a federal subject of Russia (an oblast). It includes the Arctic archipelagos of Franz Josef Land and Novaya Zemlya, as well as the Solovetsky Islands in the White Sea. Arkhangelsk Oblast also has administrative jurisdiction over Nenets Autonomous Okrug. Including Nenetsia, Arkhangelsk Oblast has an area of 587,400 km^{2}. Its population (including Nenetsia) was 1,227,626 as of the 2010 Census.

== Arkhangelsk City ==
Rural localities in Arkhangelsk city of republic significance:

- Talazhsky aviagorodok

== Kargopolsky District ==
Rural localities in Kargopolsky District:

- Abakumovo
- Agafonovskaya
- Andronovskaya
- Belaya
- Bolshaya Kondratovskaya
- Bolshoy Khaluy
- Gar
- Gavrilovskaya
- Kalitinka
- Kazakovo
- Kiprovo
- Krominskaya
- Lapinskaya
- Lazarevskaya
- Lodygino
- Lukino
- Malaya Kondratovskaya
- Martakovo
- Morshchikhinskaya
- Myza
- Nifantovskaya
- Nikiforovo
- Niz
- Patrovskaya
- Pesok
- Petrovskaya
- Podzyshevskaya
- Pogost Navolochny
- Pogost
- Prigorodny
- Savino
- Shelokhovskaya
- Shiryaikha
- Skoryukovo
- Solza
- Stegnevskaya
- Svarozero
- Timoshinskaya
- Turovo
- Vatamanovskaya
- Volosovskaya
- Vorobyovskaya
- Zalyazhye
- Zazhigino
- Zelyony Bor

== Kholmogorsky District ==
Rural localities in Kholmogorsky District:

- Belaya Gora
- Belogorsky
- Bolshaya Tovra
- Dvinskoy
- Gbach
- Ichkovo
- Kholmogory
- Konoksa
- Kopachyovo
- Lomonosovo
- Lysitsa
- Malaya Tovra
- Plakhino
- Pochtovoye
- Pogost, Khavrogorsky Selsoviet
- Pogost, Seletsky Selsoviet
- Pogost, Yemetsky Selsoviet
- Pyatkovo
- Svetly
- Ust-Pinega
- Vavchuga
- Vaymuzhsky
- Yemetsk
- Zabolotye
- Zachachye

== Konoshsky District ==
Rural localities in Konoshsky District:

- Fominskaya
- Fominsky
- Klimovskaya
- Melentyevsky
- Mirny
- Motylyovo
- Norinskaya
- Podyuga
- Ponomaryovskaya
- Voloshka
- Yertsevo

== Kotlassky District ==
Rural localities in Kotlassky District:

- Basharovo
- Borovinka
- Burmasovo
- Cheryomushsky
- Chupanovo
- Fedotovskaya
- Kharitonovo
- Kotelnikovo
- Kudrino
- Medvedki
- Novinki
- Olyushino
- Osokorskaya
- Peschanitsa
- Pustosh
- Savvatiya
- Slovenskoye
- Sogra
- Udimsky
- Varavino
- Vystavka
- Yadrikha

== Krasnoborsky District ==
Rural localities in Krasnoborsky District:

- Andreyevskaya
- Berezonavolok
- Bolshaya
- Bolshaya Sludka
- Cherevkovo
- Davydkovo
- Dyabrino
- Frolovskaya
- Gorodishchenskaya
- Komarovo
- Komsomolsky
- Krasnoborsk
- Kulikovo
- Monastyrskaya Pashnya
- Sakulinskaya
- Tsivozersky Pogost
- Verkhneye Shilovo
- Verkhnyaya Sergiyevskaya
- Verkhnyaya Uftyuga
- Vershina

== Lensky District ==
Rural localities in Lensky District:

- Belopashino
- Lena
- Pustosh
- Vyyemkovo
- Yarensk

== Leshukonsky District ==
Rural localities in Leshukonsky District:

- Keba
- Leshukonskoye
- Malaya Nisogora
- Pustynya

== Mezensky District ==
Rural localities in Mezensky District:

- Bychye
- Chizhgora
- Dolgoshchelskoye Rural Settlement
- Dorogorskoye
- Ezevets
- Intsy
- Kamenka
- Kiltsa
- Kimzha
- Lampozhnya
- Melogora
- Moseyevo
- Okulovsky
- Pogorelets
- Ruchyi
- Safonovo
- Sovpolye
- Soyana

== Nyandomsky District ==
Rural localities in Nyandomsky District:

- Kodino
- Loginovskaya
- Makarovskaya
- Midyuga
- Shalakusha
- Shozhma
- Sibir

== Onezhsky District ==
Rural localities in Onezhsky District:

- Abramovskaya
- Bolshoy Bor
- Chekuyevo
- Glazanikha
- Karamino
- Korelskoye
- Kushereka
- Kyanda
- Lyamtsa
- Malozhma
- Medvedevskaya
- Naumovskaya
- Nimenga
- Pachepelda
- Pole
- Ponga
- Porog
- Posad
- Priluky
- Purnema
- Shasta
- Syrya
- Tamitsa
- Vorzogory

== Pinezhsky District ==
Rural localities in Pinezhsky District:

- Aynova
- Bereznik
- Bolshoye Krotovo
- Chakola
- Gorodetsk
- Karpogory
- Kevrola
- Krasnaya Gorka
- Krivyye Ozyora
- Kulogora
- Kuloy
- Kushkopala
- Mezhdurechensky
- Novolavela
- Nyukhcha
- Pachikha
- Pinega
- Pirinem
- Ruchyi
- Shardonem
- Shasta
- Shotogorka
- Shotova
- Shuyga
- Siya
- Sosnovka
- Sura
- Valdokurye
- Vaymusha
- Verkola
- Yasny
- Yedoma
- Yorkino
- Zanyukhcha

== Plesetsky District ==
Rural localities in Plesetsky District:

- Alexeyevskaya
- Baratikha
- Bogdanovo
- Bolshaya Kyama
- Bulatovo
- Denislavye
- Fedovo
- Grishina
- Iksa
- Karelskoye
- Konyovo
- Koryakino
- Kositsyna
- Lipakovo
- Lomovoye
- Luzhma
- Malinovka
- Matnema
- Navolok
- Nizhneye Ustye
- Oksovsky
- Pervomaysky
- Podgornya
- Podvolochye
- Puksoozero
- Samoded
- Seza
- Shchukozerye
- Sheleksa
- Shestovo
- Sheyna
- Shishkina
- Shurenga
- Shvakino
- Skripovo
- Tarasikha
- Tarasovo
- Ulitino
- Undozero
- Vershinino
- Yakshina
- Yangory
- Yarnema
- Yemtsa
- Yura-Gora
- Yurmala
- Zakumikhinskaya
- Zashondomye

== Primorsky District ==
Rural localities in Primorsky District:

- Bobrovo (settlement)
- Bobrovo (village)
- Dolgoye
- Katunino
- Khorkovo
- Konetsdvorye
- Korely
- Kuya
- Lastola
- Laysky Dok
- Letnyaya Zolotitsa
- Lopshenga
- Luda
- Odinochka
- Oporno-Opytny Punkt
- Patrakeyevka
- Pertominsk
- Povrakulskaya
- Pushlakhta
- Rembuyevo
- Rikasikha
- Talagi
- Una
- Uyemsky
- Vaskovo
- Verkhnyaya Zolotitsa
- Voznesenye

== Severodvinsk ==
Rural localities in Severodvinsk urban okrug:

- Nyonoksa
- Solza
- Sopka

== Shenkursky District ==
Rural localities in Shenkursky District:

- Chashchinskaya
- Ivanovskoye
- Kameshnik
- Kulikovskaya
- Nikiforovskaya
- Nizhnezolotilovo
- Nosovskaya
- Nosovskaya
- Odintsovskaya
- Rakovskaya
- Rovdino
- Rybogorskaya
- Shegovary
- Shipunovskaya
- Stepychevskaya

== Solovetsky District ==
Rural localities in Solovetsky District:

- Solovetsky

== Ustyansky District ==
Rural localities in Ustyansky District:

- Akichkin Pochinok
- Andreyev Pochinok
- Bereznik
- Edma
- Ileza
- Kizema
- Kononovskaya
- Loyga
- Mitinskaya
- Podgornaya
- Shangaly
- Stroyevskoye
- Studenets
- Zadorye
- Zubarevskaya

== Velsky District ==
Rural localities in Velsky District:

- Argunovskaya
- Argunovsky
- Artemkovskaya
- Begunovskaya
- Blagoveshchenskoye
- Borovinka
- Dolmatovo
- Dyukovskaya
- Fedkovo
- Filyayevskaya
- Georgiyevskoye
- Golovkovskaya
- Gorka Muravyovskaya
- Gridinskaya
- Ivanskoye
- Khozmino
- Kolokolovskaya
- Komsomolsky
- Kozlovskaya
- Kulakovo-Podgorye
- Luchinskaya
- Lukinskaya
- Malaya Lipovka
- Meledinskaya
- Nadruchevskaya
- Neklyudovskaya
- Nikitinskaya
- Okulovskaya
- Ovsyannikovskaya
- Palkino
- Palkinskaya
- Pasva
- Pavlovskoye
- Pershinskaya
- Petregino
- Petukhovskaya
- Pezhma
- Plesovskaya
- Pogost
- Pokrovskaya
- Prilutskaya
- Pritykinskaya
- Pugachevskaya
- Pustynga
- Rystseva Gorka
- Shilovskaya
- Shoksha
- Shunema
- Smolyanskaya
- Solginsky
- Stepankovskaya
- Terebino
- Tyogro-Ozero
- Ulasovskaya
- Ust-Shonosha
- Voronovskaya
- Voskresenskoye
- Yefremkovskaya
- Yukhnevo
- Zalemenga

== Verkhnetoyemsky District ==
Rural localities in Verkhnetoyemsky District:

- Abramkovo
- Akulovskaya
- Avnyugsky
- Borisovskaya
- Chyoda
- Dvinskoy
- Glinny Mys
- Isakovskaya
- Kondratovskaya
- Kornilovskaya
- Krasnaya
- Lambas
- Larionovskaya
- Lukinskaya
- Novgorodskaya
- Okulovskaya
- Rechnoy
- Shoromskaya
- Sogra
- Sosnovy
- Verkhnyaya Toyma
- Vlasyevskaya
- Voznesenskoye
- Yefimovo
- Zaytsevo
- Zelennik

== Vilegodsky District ==
Rural localities in Vilegodsky District:

- Ilyinsko-Podomskoye
- Kochnegovskaya
- Nikolsk
- Penkino
- Shiroky Priluk

== Vinogradovsky District ==
Rural localities in Vinogradovsky District:

- Alexeyevskaya
- Antonovskaya
- Artyushinskaya
- Bereznik
- Bereznichek
- Chamovo
- Fillipovskaya
- Gora
- Gorodok
- Gridinskaya
- Gusevo
- Kargovino
- Khetovo
- Khokhnovskaya
- Klykovskaya
- Konetsgorye
- Konovalovskaya
- Korbala
- Kuliga
- Kvakhtyuga
- Mikhaylovskaya
- Moleprovod
- Monastyryok
- Morshikhinskaya
- Morzhegory
- Nadozerye
- Navolok
- Nikitinskaya
- Nironovskaya
- Nizhneye Chazhestrovo
- Nizhnyaya Topsa
- Nizhnyaya Vayenga
- Novy
- Osinovo
- Panitsa
- Plyoso
- Priluk
- Pyanda
- Pyanda
- Rochegda
- Rodionovskaya
- Rostovskoye
- Ryazanovo
- Safronovskaya
- Savinskaya
- Selmenga
- Seltso
- Sergeyevskaya
- Shidrovo
- Shidrovo
- Shilenga
- Shosheltsy
- Shuzhega
- Sidorovskaya
- Skobeli
- Sloboda
- Topsa
- Troynichevskaya
- Tugarinskaya
- Ust-Morzh
- Ust-Vaga
- Ust-Vayenga
- Uyta
- Vazhsky
- Verkhneye-Chazhestrovo
- Verkhnyaya Kitsa
- Verkhnyaya Vayenga
- Vlasyevskaya
- Vorontsy
- Vysokusha
- Yakovlevskaya
- Zaborye
- Zadorikha

== Zapolyarny District ==
Rural localities in Zapolyarny District: (Note: Zapolyarny District is the only district in Nenets Autonomous Okrug.)

- Amderma
- Karataika
- Khorey-Ver
- Khoseda-Khardsky
- Mgla
- Nelmin-Nos
- Nes
- Pustozersk
- Shoyna
- Ust-Kara
- Varnek

== See also ==
- Lists of rural localities in Russia
