= Medvedevskaya, Onezhsky District, Arkhangelsk Oblast =

Medvedevskaya Медведевская
- Village
- Location within Arkhangelsk Oblast Location within Russia
- Coordinates: 63°49′N 38°18′E
- Country: Russia
- Region: Arkhangelsk Oblast
- District: Onezhsky District
- Time zone: UTC+3:00

Medvedevskaya (Russian: Медведевская) is a rural locality (a village) in Porozhskoye Rural Settlement of Onezhsky District, Arkhangelsk Oblast, Russia. The population was 18 as of 2010.

== Geography ==
Medvedevskaya is located on the Onega River, 17 km southeast of Onega (the district's administrative centre) by road. Amosovskaya is the nearest rural locality.
