= Burmasovo =

Burmasovo Бурмасово
- Village
- Location within Arkhangelsk Oblast Location within Russia
- Coordinates: 61°03′N 46°36′E
- Country: Russia
- Region: Arkhangelsk Oblast
- District: Kotlassky District
- Time zone: UTC+3:00

Burmasovo (Russian: Бурмасово) is a rural locality (a village) in Cheryomushskoye Rural Settlement of Kotlassky District, Arkhangelsk Oblast, Russia. The population was 14 as of 2010.

== Geography ==
Burmasovo is located on the Ukhtomka River, 24 km south of Kotlas (the district's administrative centre) by road. Medvedki is the nearest rural locality.
