= Solza, Arkhangelsk Oblast =

Solza Солза
- Village
- Location within Arkhangelsk Oblast Location within Russia
- Coordinates: 64°32′N 39°32′E
- Country: Russia
- Region: Arkhangelsk Oblast
- District: Severodvinsk Urban okrug
- Time zone: UTC+3:00

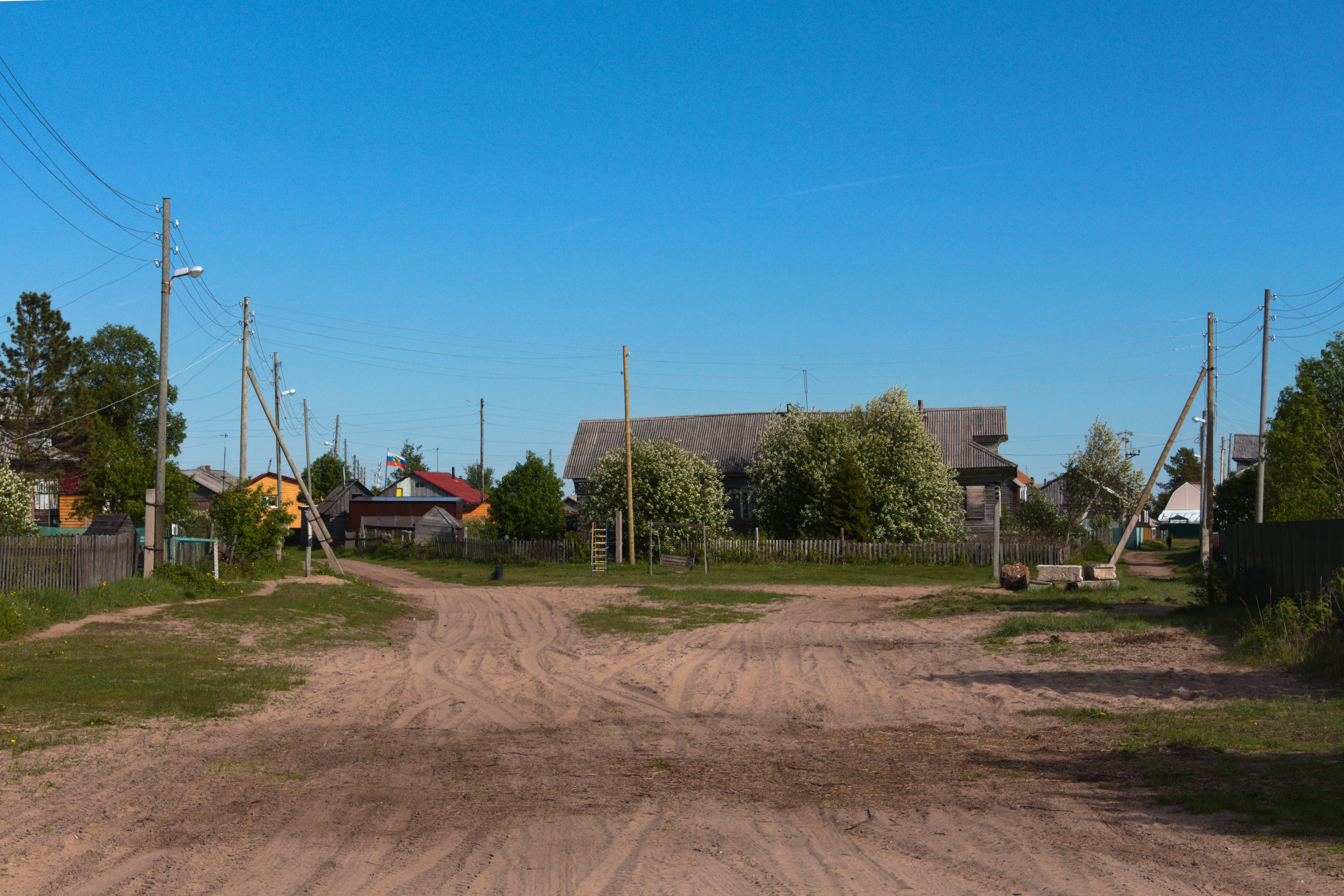
Center of Solza village.

Solza (Russian: Со́лза) is a rural locality (a village) in Nyonokskiy Administrative okrug of Severodvinsk Urban okrug, Arkhangelsk Oblast, Russia. The population was 49 as of 2010.
