= Yefremkovskaya =

Yefremkovskaya Ефремковская
- Village
- Location within Arkhangelsk Oblast Location within Russia
- Coordinates: 61°20′N 42°05′E
- Country: Russia
- Region: Arkhangelsk Oblast
- District: Velsky District
- Time zone: UTC+3:00

Yefremkovskaya (Russian: Ефремковская) is a rural locality (a village) and the administrative center of Pakshengskoye Rural Settlement of Velsky District, Arkhangelsk Oblast, Russia. The population was 281 as of 2014. There are 5 streets.

== Geography ==
Yefremkovskaya is located 38 km north of Velsk (the district's administrative centre) by road. Artemkovskaya is the nearest rural locality.
