= Kulogora =

Kulogora Кулогора
- Village
- Location within Arkhangelsk Oblast Location within Russia
- Coordinates: 64°43′N 43°27′E
- Country: Russia
- Region: Arkhangelsk Oblast
- District: Pinezhsky District
- Time zone: UTC+3:00

Kulogora (Russian: Кулогора) is a rural locality (a village) in Pinezhsky District, Arkhangelsk Oblast, Russia. The population was 78 as of 2012.

== Geography ==
Kulogora is located 134 km northwest of Karpogory (the district's administrative centre) by road. Pinega is the nearest rural locality.
