= Rakovskaya =

Rakovskaya Раковская
- Village
- Location within Arkhangelsk Oblast Location within Russia
- Coordinates: 62°20′N 41°55′E
- Country: Russia
- Region: Arkhangelsk Oblast
- District: Shenkursky District
- Time zone: UTC+3:00

Rakovskaya (Russian: Раковская) is a rural locality (a village) in Shenkursky District, Arkhangelsk Oblast, Russia. The population was 76 as of 2010.

== Geography ==
Rakovskaya is located 96 km northwest of Shenkursk (the district's administrative centre) by road, on the Led River. Ukolok is the nearest rural locality.
