= Ust-Morzh =

Ust-Morzh Усть-Морж
- Village
- Location within Arkhangelsk Oblast Location within Russia
- Coordinates: 63°02′N 42°18′E
- Country: Russia
- Region: Arkhangelsk Oblast
- District: Vinogradovsky District
- Time zone: UTC+3:00

Ust-Morzh (Russian: Усть-Морж) is a rural locality (a village) in Vinogradovsky District, Arkhangelsk Oblast, Russia. The population was 49 as of 2010. There are 3 streets.

== Geography ==
Ust-Morzh is located on the Severnaya Dvina River, 36 km northwest of Bereznik (the district's administrative centre) by road. Khetovo is the nearest rural locality.
