= Savino, Kargopolsky District, Arkhangelsk Oblast =

Savino Савино
- Village
- Location within Arkhangelsk Oblast Location within Russia
- Coordinates: 61°37′N 38°52′E
- Country: Russia
- Region: Arkhangelsk Oblast
- District: Kargopolsky District
- Time zone: UTC+3:00

Savino (Russian: Савино) is a rural locality (a village) in Kargopolsky District, Arkhangelsk Oblast, Russia. The population was 3 as of 2012.

== Geography ==
Savino is located 16 km north of Kargopol (the district's administrative centre) by road. Petrovskaya is the nearest rural locality.
