= Abramovskaya, Arkhangelsk Oblast =

Abramovskaya Абрамовская
- Village
- Location within Arkhangelsk Oblast Location within Russia
- Coordinates: 63°44′N 37°24′E
- Country: Russia
- Region: Arkhangelsk Oblast
- District: Onezhsky District
- Time zone: UTC+3:00

Abramovskaya (Russian: Абрамовская) is a rural locality (a village) in Maloshuyskoye Urban Settlement of Onezhsky District, Arkhangelsk Oblast, Russia. The population was 237 as of 2010. There are 3 streets.

== Geography ==
It is located on the Maloshuyka River, 975 km southwest of Onega (the district's administrative centre) by road. Maloshuyka is the nearest rural locality.
