= Sidorovskaya =

Sidorovskaya Сидоровская
- Village
- Location within Arkhangelsk Oblast Location within Russia
- Coordinates: 62°42′N 43°17′E
- Country: Russia
- Region: Arkhangelsk Oblast
- District: Vinogradovsky District
- Time zone: UTC+3:00

Sidorovskaya (Russian: Сидоровская) is a rural locality (a village) in Osinovskoye Rural Settlement, Vinogradovsky District, Arkhangelsk Oblast, Russia. The population was 15 as of 2010.

== Geography ==
Sidorovskaya is located on the Severnaya Dvina River, 37 km southeast of Bereznik (the district's administrative centre) by road. Filippovskaya is the nearest rural locality.
