= Bolshaya Sludka =

Bolshaya Sludka Большая Слудка
- Village
- Location within Arkhangelsk Oblast Location within Russia
- Coordinates: 61°37′N 46°05′E
- Country: Russia
- Region: Arkhangelsk Oblast
- District: Krasnoborsky District
- Time zone: UTC+3:00

Bolshaya Sludka (Russian: Большая Слудка) is a rural locality (a village) and the administrative center of Belosludskoye Rural Settlement of Krasnoborsky District, Arkhangelsk Oblast, Russia. The population was 517 as of 2010.

== Geography ==
Bolshaya Sludka is located 16 km northeast of Krasnoborsk (the district's administrative centre) by road. Tolsha 1-ya is the nearest rural locality.
