= Oporno-Opytny Punkt =

Oporno-Opytny Punkt Опорно-Опытный Пункт
- Village
- Location within Arkhangelsk Oblast Location within Russia
- Coordinates: 64°28′N 40°27′E
- Country: Russia
- Region: Arkhangelsk Oblast
- District: Primorsky District
- Time zone: UTC+3:00

Oporno-Opytny Punkt (Russian: Опорно-Опытный Пункт) is a rural locality (a village) in Zaostrovskoye Rural Settlement of Primorsky District, Arkhangelsk Oblast, Russia. The population was 10 as of 2010.

== Geography ==
Oporno-Opytny Punkt is located 16 km southwest of Arkhangelsk (the district's administrative centre) by road. Perkhachevo is the nearest rural locality.
