= Shasta, Onezhsky District, Arkhangelsk Oblast =

Shasta Шаста
- Settlement
- Location within Arkhangelsk Oblast Location within Russia
- Coordinates: 63°42′N 37°49′E
- Country: Russia
- Region: Arkhangelsk Oblast
- District: Onezhsky District
- Time zone: UTC+3:00

Shasta (Russian: Шаста) is a rural locality (a settlement) in Nimengskoye Rural Settlement of Onezhsky District, Arkhangelsk Oblast, Russia. The population was 329 as of 2010. There are 5 streets.

== Geography ==
Shasta is located 995 km southwest of Onega (the district's administrative centre) by road. Nimenga is the nearest rural locality.
