= Navolok, Plesetsky District, Arkhangelsk Oblast =

Navolok Наволок
- Village
- Location within Arkhangelsk Oblast Location within Russia
- Coordinates: 62°49′N 41°12′E
- Country: Russia
- Region: Arkhangelsk Oblast
- District: Plesetsky District
- Time zone: UTC+3:00

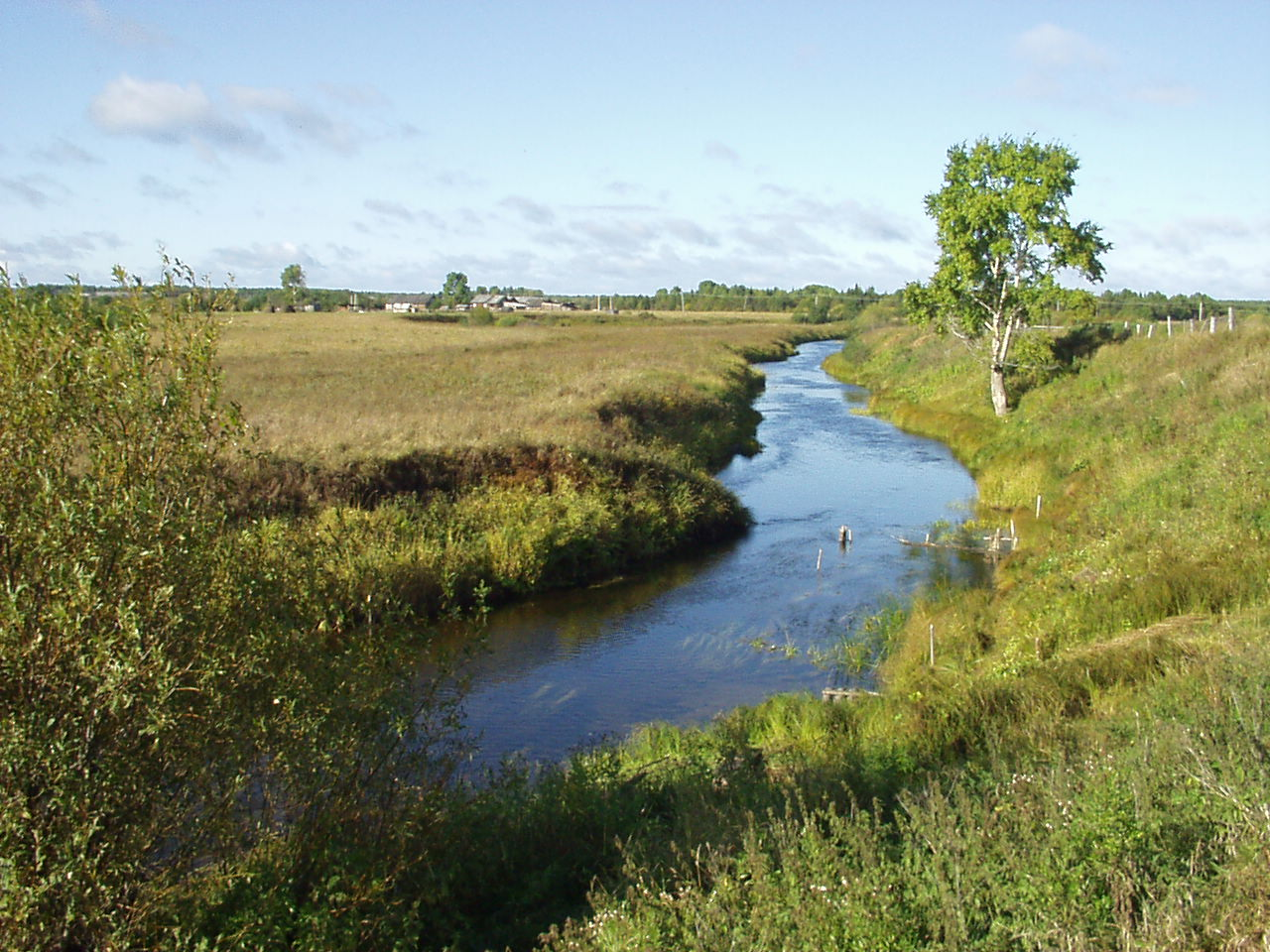

Navolok (Russian: Наволок) is a rural locality (a village) in Plesetsky District, Arkhangelsk Oblast, Russia. The population was 4 in 2012.

== Geography ==
It is located on the Puksa River.
