= Glazanikha =

Glazanikha Глазаниха
- Settlement
- Location within Arkhangelsk Oblast Location within Russia
- Coordinates: 63°47′N 38°59′E
- Country: Russia
- Region: Arkhangelsk Oblast
- District: Onezhsky District
- Time zone: UTC+3:00

Glazanikha (Russian: Глазаниха) is a rural locality (a settlement) in Kodinskoye Rural Settlement of Onezhsky District, Arkhangelsk Oblast, Russia. The population was 415 as of 2010. There are 12 streets.

== Geography ==
It is located on the Shomboruchey River, 57 km southeast of Onega (the district's administrative centre) by road. Vonguda is the nearest rural locality.
