= Akulovskaya =

Akulovskaya Акуловская
- Village
- Location within Arkhangelsk Oblast Location within Russia
- Coordinates: 61°59′N 45°24′E
- Country: Russia
- Region: Arkhangelsk Oblast
- District: Verkhnetoyemsky District
- Time zone: UTC+3:00

Akulovskaya (Russian: Акуловская) is a rural locality (a village) in Dvinskoye Rural Settlement of Verkhnetoyemsky District, Arkhangelsk Oblast, Russia. The population was 22 as of 2010.

== Geography ==
Akulovskaya is located on the Yorga River, 48 km southeast of Verkhnyaya Toyma (the district's administrative centre) by road. Fominskaya is the nearest rural locality.
