= Shuyga =

Shuyga Шуйга
- Settlement
- Location within Arkhangelsk Oblast Location within Russia
- Coordinates: 63°31′N 45°41′E
- Country: Russia
- Region: Arkhangelsk Oblast
- District: Pinezhsky District
- Time zone: UTC+3:00

Shuyga (Russian: Шуйга) is a rural locality (a settlement) in Surskoye Rural Settlement of Pinezhsky District, Arkhangelsk Oblast, Russia. The population was 472 as of 2010. There are 11 streets.

== Geography ==
Shuyga is located on the Shuyga River, 99 km southeast of Karpogory (the district's administrative centre) by road. Shulomen is the nearest rural locality.
