= Verkhnyaya Sergiyevskaya =

Verkhnyaya Sergiyevskaya Верхняя Сергиевская
- Village
- Location within Arkhangelsk Oblast Location within Russia
- Coordinates: 61°41′N 45°24′E
- Country: Russia
- Region: Arkhangelsk Oblast
- District: Krasnoborsky District

Population (2010)
  - Total: 104
- Time zone: UTC+3:00

Verkhnyaya Sergiyevskaya (Russian: Верхняя Сергиевская) is a rural locality (a village) in Cherevkovskoye Rural Settlement, Krasnoborsky District, Arkhangelsk Oblast, Russia. The population was 104 as of 2010.

== Geography ==
Verkhnyaya Sergiyevskaya is located 35 km northwest of Krasnoborsk (the district's administrative centre) by road. Andreyevskaya is the nearest rural locality.
