= Lapinskaya =

Lapinskaya Лапинская
- Village
- Location within Arkhangelsk Oblast Location within Russia
- Coordinates: 61°21′N 38°55′E
- Country: Russia
- Region: Arkhangelsk Oblast
- District: Kargopolsky District
- Time zone: UTC+3:00

Lapinskaya (Russian: Лапинская) is a rural locality (a village) in Kargopolsky District, Arkhangelsk Oblast, Russia. The population was 10 as of 2012.

== Geography ==
Lapinskaya is located 20 km south of Kargopol (the district's administrative centre) by road. Sidorovskaya is the nearest rural locality.
