= Myza, Kargopolsky District, Arkhangelsk Oblast =

Myza Мыза
- Village
- Location within Arkhangelsk Oblast Location within Russia
- Coordinates: 61°30′N 38°49′E
- Country: Russia
- Region: Arkhangelsk Oblast
- District: Kargopolsky District
- Time zone: UTC+3:00

Myza (Russian: Мыза) is a rural locality (a village) in Kargopolsky District, Arkhangelsk Oblast, Russia. The population was 3 as of 2012.

== Geography ==
Myza is located 7 km west of Kargopol (the district's administrative centre) by road. Lukino is the nearest rural locality.
