= Vorontsy =

Vorontsy Воронцы
- Settlement
- Location within Arkhangelsk Oblast Location within Russia
- Coordinates: 62°56′N 43°03′E
- Country: Russia
- Region: Arkhangelsk Oblast
- District: Vinogradovsky District
- Time zone: UTC+3:00

Vorontsy (Russian: Воронцы) is a rural locality (a settlement) in Vinogradovsky District, Arkhangelsk Oblast, Russia. The population was 249 as of 2010. There are 4 streets.

== Geography ==
Vorontsy is located on the Vayenga River, 38 km northeast of Bereznik (the district's administrative centre) by road.
