= Vaymusha =

Vaymusha Ваймуша
- Village
- Location within Arkhangelsk Oblast Location within Russia
- Coordinates: 63°58′N 44°30′E
- Country: Russia
- Region: Arkhangelsk Oblast
- District: Pinezhsky District
- Time zone: UTC+3:00

Vaymusha (Russian: Ваймуша) is a rural locality (a village) in Karpogorskoye Rural Settlement of Pinezhsky District, Arkhangelsk Oblast, Russia. The population was 723 as of 2010. There are 7 streets present in the locality.

== Geography ==
Vaymusha is located on the Pinega River, 5 km southeast of Karpogory (the district's administrative centre) by road. Karpogory is the nearest rural locality.

== History ==
=== Pre-Slavic ===
Before the arrival of Slavs in Pinzhsky District, the village was inhabited by Finno-Ugric tribes. The Finno-Ugric names they used for villages and bodies of water have been preserved.

=== Russian Colonization ===
During the 15th and 16th century, there was high immigration by Slavs to the Pinega River surrondings.
