= Kulakovo-Podgorye =

Kulakovo-Podgorye Кулаково-Подгорье
- Village
- Location within Arkhangelsk Oblast Location within Russia
- Coordinates: 61°20′N 42°05′E
- Country: Russia
- Region: Arkhangelsk Oblast
- District: Velsky District
- Time zone: UTC+3:00

Kulakovo-Podgorye (Russian: Кулаково-Подгорье) is a rural locality (a village) in Pakshengskoye Rural Settlement of Velsky District, Arkhangelsk Oblast, Russia. The population was 64 as of 2014. There is 1 street.

== Geography ==
Kulakovo-Podgorye is located 39 km north of Velsk (the district's administrative centre) by road. Petregino is the nearest rural locality.
