= Krivyye Ozyora =

Krivyye Ozyora Кривые Озёра
- Settlement
- Location within Arkhangelsk Oblast Location within Russia
- Coordinates: 64°53′N 43°14′E
- Country: Russia
- Region: Arkhangelsk Oblast
- District: Pinezhsky District
- Time zone: UTC+3:00

Krivyye Ozyora (Russian: Кривые Озёра) is a rural locality (a settlement) in Pinezhskoye Rural Settlement of Pinezhsky District, Arkhangelsk Oblast, Russia. The population was 162 as of 2010. There are 4 streets.

== Geography ==
Krivyye Ozyora is located 155 km northwest of Karpogory (the district's administrative centre) by road. Voyepala is the nearest rural locality.
