= Iksa =

Iksa Икса
- Settlement
- Location within Arkhangelsk Oblast Location within Russia
- Coordinates: 62°35′N 39°49′E
- Country: Russia
- Region: Arkhangelsk Oblast
- District: Plesetsky District
- Time zone: UTC+3:00

Iksa (Russian: Икса) is a rural locality (a settlement) in Plesetsky District, Arkhangelsk Oblast, Russia. The population was 1,149 as of 2010. There are 8 streets.

== Geography ==
Iksa is located 36 km southwest of Plesetsk (the district's administrative centre) by road. Severoonezhsk is the nearest rural locality.
