= Klykovskaya =

Klykovskaya Клыковская
- Village
- Location within Arkhangelsk Oblast Location within Russia
- Coordinates: 62°36′N 43°39′E
- Country: Russia
- Region: Arkhangelsk Oblast
- District: Vinogradovsky District
- Time zone: UTC+3:00

Klykovskaya (Russian: Клыковская) is a rural locality (a village) in Vinogradovsky District, Arkhangelsk Oblast, Russia. The population was 14 as of 2010. There are 2 streets.

== Geography ==
Klykovskaya is located on the Topsa River, 62 km southeast of Bereznik (the district's administrative centre) by road. Topsa is the nearest rural locality.
