= Navolok =

Navolok Наволок
- Village
- Location within Arkhangelsk Oblast Location within Russia
- Coordinates: 62°45′N 43°01′E
- Country: Russia
- Region: Arkhangelsk Oblast
- District: Vinogradovsky District
- Time zone: UTC+3:00

Navolok (Russian: Наволок) is a rural locality (a village) in Vinogradovsky District, Arkhangelsk Oblast, Russia. The population was 42 as of 2010.

== Geography ==
It is located on the Severnaya Dvina River.
