= Laysky Dok =

Laysky Dok Лайский Док
- Settlement
- Location within Arkhangelsk Oblast Location within Russia
- Coordinates: 64°32′N 40°15′E
- Country: Russia
- Region: Arkhangelsk Oblast
- District: Primorsky District
- Time zone: UTC+3:00

Laysky Dok (Russian: Лайский Док) is a rural locality (a settlement) in Primorsky District, Arkhangelsk Oblast, Russia. The population was 728 as of 2010. There are 6 streets.

== Geography ==
Laysky Dok is located on the Laya River, 24 km west of Arkhangelsk (the district's administrative centre) by road. Tsiglomen is the nearest rural locality.
