= Patrovskaya =

Patrovskaya Патровская
- Village
- Location within Arkhangelsk Oblast Location within Russia
- Coordinates: 61°16′N 38°34′E
- Country: Russia
- Region: Arkhangelsk Oblast
- District: Kargopolsky District
- Time zone: UTC+3:00

Patrovskaya (Russian: Патровская) is a rural locality (a village) in Kargopolsky District, Arkhangelsk Oblast, Russia. The population was 319 as of 2012. There is 1 street.

== Geography ==
Patrovskaya is located 44 km southwest of Kargopol (the district's administrative centre) by road. Filosofskaya is the nearest rural locality.
