= Nironovskaya =

Nironovskaya Нироновская
- Village
- Location within Arkhangelsk Oblast Location within Russia
- Coordinates: 62°36′N 43°28′E
- Country: Russia
- Region: Arkhangelsk Oblast
- District: Vinogradovsky District
- Time zone: UTC+3:00

Nironovskaya (Russian: Нироновская) is a rural locality (a village) in Vinogradovsky District, Arkhangelsk Oblast, Russia. The population was 6 as of 2010.

== Geography ==
Nironovskaya is located on the Severnaya Dvina River, 60 km southeast of Bereznik (the district's administrative centre) by road. Stepanovskaya is the nearest rural locality.
