= Nizhneye Chazhestrovo =

Nizhneye Chazhestrovo Нижнее Чажестрово
- Village
- Location within Arkhangelsk Oblast Location within Russia
- Coordinates: 62°53′N 42°36′E
- Country: Russia
- Region: Arkhangelsk Oblast
- District: Vinogradovsky District
- Time zone: UTC+3:00

Nizhneye Chazhestrovo (Russian: Нижнее Чажестрово) is a rural locality (a village) in Vinogradovsky District, Arkhangelsk Oblast, Russia. The population was 197 as of 2010. There are 6 streets.

== Geography ==
Nizhneye Chazhestrovo is located on the Severnaya Dvina River, 7 km northwest of Bereznik (the district's administrative centre) by road. Verkhneye Chazhestrovo is the nearest rural locality.
