= Korely =

Korely Корелы
- Village
- Location within Arkhangelsk Oblast Location within Russia
- Coordinates: 64°39′N 40°38′E
- Country: Russia
- Region: Arkhangelsk Oblast
- District: Primorsky District
- Time zone: UTC+3:00

Korely (Russian: Корелы) is a rural locality (a village) in Talazhskoye Rural Settlement of Primorsky District, Arkhangelsk Oblast, Russia. The population was 5 as of 2010.

== Geography ==
Korely is located on the Povrakulsky Island, 20 km northeast of Arkhangelsk (the district's administrative centre) by road. Povrakulskaya is the nearest rural locality.
