= Bolshaya Kondratovskaya =

Bolshaya Kondratovskaya Большая Кондратовская
- Village
- Location within Arkhangelsk Oblast Location within Russia
- Coordinates: 61°21′N 38°54′E
- Country: Russia
- Region: Arkhangelsk Oblast
- District: Kargopolsky District
- Time zone: UTC+3:00

Bolshaya Kondratovskaya (Russian: Большая Кондратовская) is a rural locality (a village) in Kargopolsky District, Arkhangelsk Oblast, Russia. The population was 18 as of 2012.

== Geography ==
Bolshaya Kondratovskaya is located 21 km south of Kargopol (the district's administrative centre) by road. Sidorovskaya is the nearest rural locality.
