= Abramkovo, Arkhangelsk Oblast =

Abramkovo Абрамково
- Settlement
- Location within Arkhangelsk Oblast Location within Russia
- Coordinates: 62°05′N 45°06′E
- Country: Russia
- Region: Arkhangelsk Oblast
- District: Verkhnetoyemsky District
- Time zone: UTC+3:00

Abramkovo (Russian: Абрамково) is a rural locality (a settlement) in Verkhnetoyemsky District, Arkhangelsk Oblast, Russia. The population was 89 as of 2010. There is 1 street.

== Geography ==
Abramkovo is located on the Severnaya Dvina River, 23 km south of Verkhnyaya Toyma (the district's administrative centre) by road. Yazinets is the nearest rural locality.
