= Svarozero =

Svarozero Сварозеро
- Village
- Location within Arkhangelsk Oblast Location within Russia
- Coordinates: 61°01′N 38°32′E
- Country: Russia
- Region: Arkhangelsk Oblast
- District: Kargopolsky District
- Time zone: UTC+3:00

Svarozero (Russian: Сварозеро) is a rural locality (a village) in Ukhotskoye Rural Settlement of Kargopolsky District, Arkhangelsk Oblast, Russia. The population was 25 as of 2010.

== Geography ==
Svarozero is located 73 km south of Kargopol (the district's administrative centre) by road. Medvedevo is the nearest rural locality.
