= Slovenskoye =

Slovenskoye Словенское
- Village
- Location within Arkhangelsk Oblast Location within Russia
- Coordinates: 61°15′N 46°35′E
- Country: Russia
- Region: Arkhangelsk Oblast
- District: Kotlassky District
- Time zone: UTC+3:00

Slovenskoye (Russian: Словенское) is a rural locality (a village) in Privodinskoye Urban Settlement of Kotlassky District, Arkhangelsk Oblast, Russia. The population was 1 as of 2010.

== Geography ==
Slovenskoye is located on the Severnaya Dvina River, 5 km west of Kotlas (the district's administrative centre) by road. Mezhnik is the nearest rural locality.
