= Luda, Arkhangelsk Oblast =

Luda Луда
- Village
- Location within Arkhangelsk Oblast Location within Russia
- Coordinates: 64°58′N 38°09′E
- Country: Russia
- Region: Arkhangelsk Oblast
- District: Primorsky District
- Time zone: UTC+3:00

Luda (Russian: Луда) is a rural locality (a village) in Pertominskoye Rural Settlement of Primorsky District, Arkhangelsk Oblast, Russia. The population was 74 as of 2010.

== Geography ==
Luda is located on the Luda River, 154 km west of Arkhangelsk (the district's administrative centre) by road. Una is the nearest rural locality.
