= Artyushinskaya =

Artyushinskaya Артюшинская
- Village
- Location within Arkhangelsk Oblast Location within Russia
- Coordinates: 62°44′N 43°15′E
- Country: Russia
- Region: Arkhangelsk Oblast
- District: Vinogradovsky District
- Time zone: UTC+3:00

Artyushinskaya (Russian: Артюшинская) is a rural locality (a village) in Osinovskoye Rural Settlement of Vinogradovsky District, Arkhangelsk Oblast, Russia. The population was 25 as of 2010.

== Geography ==
Artyushinskaya is located 33 km southeast of Bereznik (the district's administrative centre) by road. Morshikhinskaya is the nearest rural locality.
