= Seza =

Seza Сеза
- Settlement
- Location within Arkhangelsk Oblast Location within Russia
- Coordinates: 62°25′N 39°05′E
- Country: Russia
- Region: Arkhangelsk Oblast
- District: Plesetsky District
- Time zone: UTC+3:00

Seza (Russian: Сеза) is a rural locality (a settlement) in Fedovskoye Rural Settlement of Plesetsky District, Arkhangelsk Oblast, Russia. The population was 83 as of 2010. There are 4 streets.

== Geography ==
Seza is located 99 km southwest of Plesetsk (the district's administrative centre) by road. Kurlayevskaya is the nearest rural locality.
