= Malinovka, Plesetsky District, Arkhangelsk Oblast =

Malinovka Малиновка
- Settlement
- Location within Arkhangelsk Oblast Location within Russia
- Coordinates: 63°16′N 40°34′E
- Country: Russia
- Region: Arkhangelsk Oblast
- District: Plesetsky District
- Time zone: UTC+3:00

Malinovka (Russian: Малиновка) is a rural locality (a settlement) in Obozerskoye Urban Settlement of Plesetsky District, Arkhangelsk Oblast, Russia. The population was 122 as of 2010. There are 2 streets.

== Geography ==
Malinovka is located 73 km north of Plesetsk (the district's administrative centre) by road. Sosnovka is the nearest rural locality.
