= Sheyna =

Sheyna Шейна
- Village
- Location within Arkhangelsk Oblast Location within Russia
- Coordinates: 62°17′N 39°30′E
- Country: Russia
- Region: Arkhangelsk Oblast
- District: Plesetsky District
- Time zone: UTC+3:00

Sheyna (Russian: Шейна) is a rural locality (a village) in Plesetsky District, Arkhangelsk Oblast, Russia. The population was 1 as of 2010.

== Geography ==
Sheyna is located 72 km southwest of Plesetsk (the district's administrative centre) by road. Kuvakino is the nearest rural locality.
