= Voznesenye, Arkhangelsk Oblast =

Voznesenye Вознесенье
- Selo
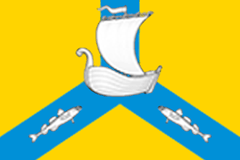
- Flag

- Location within Arkhangelsk Oblast Location within Russia
- Coordinates: 64°34′N 40°20′E
- Country: Russia
- Region: Arkhangelsk Oblast
- District: Primorsky District
- Time zone: UTC+3:00

Voznesenye (Russian: Вознесенье) is a rural locality (a selo) in Ostrovnoye Rural Settlement of Primorsky District, Arkhangelsk Oblast, Russia. The population was 377 as of 2010. There are 3 streets.

== Geography ==
Voznesenye is located on the Andrianov island, 25 km northwest of Arkhangelsk (the district's administrative centre) by road. Bolshaya Fyodorovskaya is the nearest rural locality.
