= Kargovino =

Kargovino Карговино
- Village
- Location within Arkhangelsk Oblast Location within Russia
- Coordinates: 63°04′N 42°10′E
- Country: Russia
- Region: Arkhangelsk Oblast
- District: Vinogradovsky District
- Time zone: UTC+3:00

Kargovino (Russian: Карговино) is a rural locality (a village) in Vinogradovsky District, Arkhangelsk Oblast, Russia. The population was 56 as of 2010. There are 2 streets.

Poles were deported to Kargovino in the early 1940s. A cross was erected in their memory in 1996.

== Geography ==
Kargovino is located on the Severnaya Dvina River, 46 km northwest of Bereznik (the district's administrative centre) by road. Morzhegory is the nearest rural locality.
