= Pesok =

Pesok Песок
- Village
- Location within Arkhangelsk Oblast Location within Russia
- Coordinates: 61°11′N 38°34′E
- Country: Russia
- Region: Arkhangelsk Oblast
- District: Kargopolsky District
- Time zone: UTC+3:00

Pesok (Russian: Песок) is a rural locality (a village) and the administrative center of Ukhotskoye Rural Settlement of Kargopolsky District, Arkhangelsk Oblast, Russia. The population was 108 as of 2010.

== Geography ==
Pesok is located 56 km southwest of Kargopol (the district's administrative centre) by road. Ilyino is the nearest rural locality.
