= Pachepelda =

Pachepelda Пачепельда
- Village
- Location within Arkhangelsk Oblast Location within Russia
- Coordinates: 63°27′N 39°02′E
- Country: Russia
- Region: Arkhangelsk Oblast
- District: Onezhsky District
- Time zone: UTC+3:00

Pachepelda (Russian: Пачепельда) is a rural locality (a village) in Chekuyevskoye Rural Settlement of Onezhsky District, Arkhangelsk Oblast, Russia. The population was 10 as of 2010.

== Geography ==
Pachepelda is located on the Onega River, 101 km southeast of Onega (the district's administrative centre) by road. Kaska is the nearest rural locality.
