= Georgiyevskoye, Arkhangelsk Oblast =

Georgiyevskoye Георгиевское
- Selo
- Location within Arkhangelsk Oblast Location within Russia
- Coordinates: 61°32′N 41°33′E
- Country: Russia
- Region: Arkhangelsk Oblast
- District: Velsky District
- Time zone: UTC+3:00

Georgiyevskoye (Russian: Георгиевское) is a rural locality (a selo) in Lipovskoye Rural Settlement of Velsky District, Arkhangelsk Oblast, Russia. The population was 105 as of 2014. There are 6 streets.

== Geography ==
Georgiyevskoye is located on the Verkhopuyskoye Lake, 120 km northwest of Velsk (the district's administrative centre) by road. Kuznetsovskaya is the nearest rural locality.
