= Andronovskaya =

Andronovskaya Андроновская
- Village
- Location within Arkhangelsk Oblast Location within Russia
- Coordinates: 61°38′N 39°06′E
- Country: Russia
- Region: Arkhangelsk Oblast
- District: Kargopolsky District
- Time zone: UTC+3:00

Andronovskaya (Russian: Андроновская) is a rural locality (a village) in Kargopolsky District, Arkhangelsk Oblast, Russia. The population was 26 as of 2012. There is 1 street.

== Geography ==
Andronovskaya is located 19 km north of Kargopol (the district's administrative centre) by road. Potanikha is the nearest rural locality.
