= Kondratovskaya =

Kondratovskaya Кондратовская
- Village
- Location within Arkhangelsk Oblast Location within Russia
- Coordinates: 62°22′N 43°57′E
- Country: Russia
- Region: Arkhangelsk Oblast
- District: Verkhnetoyemsky District
- Time zone: UTC+3:00

Kondratovskaya (Russian: Кондратовская) is a rural locality (a village) in Puchuzhskoye Rural Settlement of Verkhnetoyemsky District, Arkhangelsk Oblast, Russia. The population was 173 as of 2010.

== Geography ==
It is located on the Severnaya Dvina River, 70 km north-west from Verknyaya Toyma.
