= Kharitonovo, Kotlassky District, Arkhangelsk Oblast =

Kharitonovo Харитоново
- Settlement
- Location within Arkhangelsk Oblast Location within Russia
- Coordinates: 61°24′N 47°29′E
- Country: Russia
- Region: Arkhangelsk Oblast
- District: Kotlassky District
- Time zone: UTC+3:00

Kharitonovo (Russian: Харитоново) is a rural locality (a settlement) in Kotlassky District, Arkhangelsk Oblast, Russia. The population was 1,419 as of 2012. There are 28 streets.

== Geography ==
Kharitonovo is located 73 km northeast of Kotlas (the district's administrative centre) by road. Zalupya is the nearest rural locality.
