= Studenets, Arkhangelsk Oblast =

Studenets Студенец
- Settlement
- Location within Arkhangelsk Oblast Location within Russia
- Coordinates: 61°28′N 43°43′E
- Country: Russia
- Region: Arkhangelsk Oblast
- District: Ustyansky District
- Time zone: UTC+3:00

Studenets (Russian: Студенец) is a rural locality (a settlement) in Plosskoye Rural Settlement of Ustyansky District, Arkhangelsk Oblast, Russia. The population was 281 as of 2010. There are 14 streets.

== Geography ==
Studenets is located on the Ustya River, 69 km northeast of Oktyabrsky (the district's administrative centre) by road. Isakovskaya is the nearest rural locality.
