= Vatamanovskaya =

Vatamanovskaya Ватамановская
- Village
- Location within Arkhangelsk Oblast Location within Russia
- Coordinates: 61°33′N 38°35′E
- Country: Russia
- Region: Arkhangelsk Oblast
- District: Kargopolsky District
- Time zone: UTC+3:00

Vatamanovskaya (Russian: Ватамановская) is a rural locality (a village) in Kargopolsky District, Arkhangelsk Oblast, Russia. The population was 412 as of 2010. There are 7 streets.

== Geography ==
Vatamanovskaya is located 20 km northwest of Kargopol (the district's administrative centre) by road. Krasnikovskaya is the nearest rural locality.
