= Kolokolovskaya =

Kolokolovskaya Колоколовская
- Village
- Location within Arkhangelsk Oblast Location within Russia
- Coordinates: 61°32′N 41°31′E
- Country: Russia
- Region: Arkhangelsk Oblast
- District: Velsky District
- Time zone: UTC+3:00

Kolokolovskaya (Russian: Колоколовская) is a rural locality (a village) in Lipovskoye Rural Settlement of Velsky District, Arkhangelsk Oblast, Russia. The population was 33 as of 2014. There are 3 streets.

== Geography ==
Kolokolovskaya is located on the Verkhopuyskoye Lake, 123 km northwest of Velsk (the district's administrative centre) by road. Sidorovskaya is the nearest rural locality.
