= Novgorodskaya (rural locality) =

Rural locality in Arkhangelsk Oblast, Russia

Coordinates: 62°01′N 45°11′E

Novgorodskaya (Russian: Новгородская) is a rural locality (a village) in Timoshinsky Selsoviet of Verkhnetoyemsky District of Arkhangelsk Oblast, Russia.
