= Okulovsky, Mezensky District, Arkhangelsk Oblast =

Okulovsky Окуловский
- Settlement
- Location within Arkhangelsk Oblast Location within Russia
- Coordinates: 66°02′N 44°02′E
- Country: Russia
- Region: Arkhangelsk Oblast
- District: Mezensky District
- Time zone: UTC+3:00

Okulovsky (Russian: Окуловский) is a rural locality (a settlement) in Kamenskoye Urban Rural Settlement of Mezensky District, Arkhangelsk Oblast, Russia. The population was 2 as of 2010.

== Geography ==
Okulovsky is located on the Mezen River, 19 km north of Mezen (the district's administrative centre) by road. Chetsa is the nearest rural locality.
