= Talazhsky aviagorodok =

Talazhsky aviagorodok Талажский авиагородок
- Settlement
- Location within Arkhangelsk Oblast Location within Russia
- Coordinates: 64°35′N 40°42′E
- Country: Russia
- Region: Arkhangelsk Oblast
- District: Arkhangelsk
- Time zone: UTC+3:00

Talazhsky aviagorodok (Russian: Тала́жский авиагородо́к) is a rural locality (a settlement) in Arkhangelsk city of republic significance, Arkhangelsk Oblast, Russia. The population was 3,298 as of 2010.

== Geography ==
Talazhsky aviagorodok is located 14 km northeast of Arkhangelsk (the district's administrative centre) by road. Arkhangelsk is the nearest rural locality.
