= Khokhnovskaya =

Khokhnovskaya Хохновская
- Village
- Location within Arkhangelsk Oblast Location within Russia
- Coordinates: 63°03′N 42°07′E
- Country: Russia
- Region: Arkhangelsk Oblast
- District: Vinogradovsky District
- Time zone: UTC+3:00

Khokhnovskaya (Russian: Хохновская) is a rural locality (a village) in Vinogradovsky District, Arkhangelsk Oblast, Russia. The population was 2 as of 2012.

== Geography ==
Khokhnovskaya is located on the Severnaya Dvina River, 46 km northwest of Bereznik (the district's administrative centre) by road. Savinskaya is the nearest rural locality.
