= Talagi =

Talagi Талаги
- Settlement
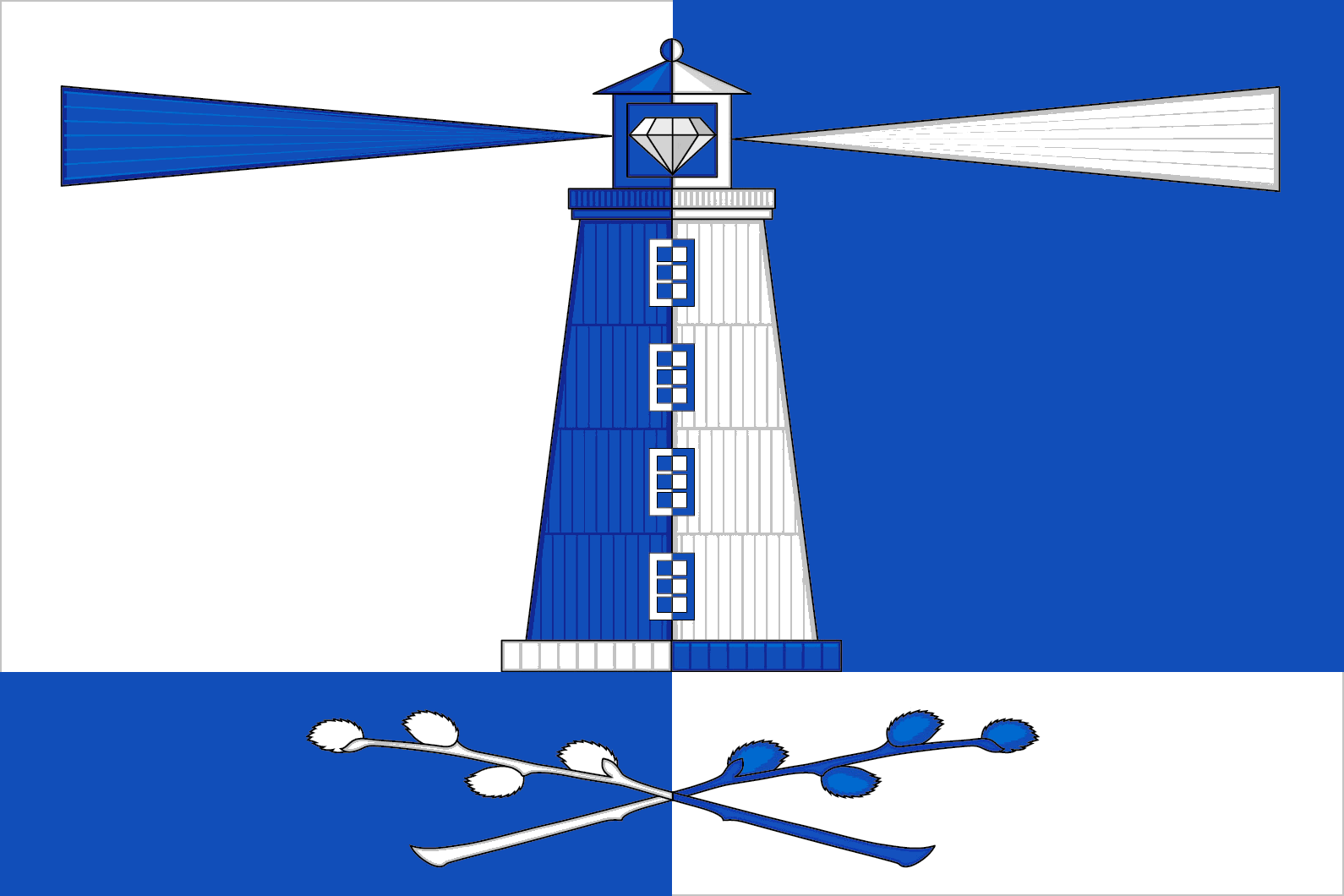
- Flag

- Location within Arkhangelsk Oblast Location within Russia
- Coordinates: 64°37′N 40°37′E
- Country: Russia
- Region: Arkhangelsk Oblast
- District: Primorsky District
- Time zone: UTC+3:00

Talagi (Russian: Талаги) is a rural locality (a settlement) and the administrative center of Talazhskoye Rural Settlement of Primorsky District, Arkhangelsk Oblast, Russia. The population was 1,829 as of 2010.

== Geography ==
Talagi is located 15 km northeast of Arkhangelsk (the district's administrative centre) by road. Povrakulskaya is the nearest rural locality.
