= Solza, Kargopolsky District, Arkhangelsk Oblast =

Solza Солза
- Settlement
- Location within Arkhangelsk Oblast Location within Russia
- Coordinates: 60°54′N 38°22′E
- Country: Russia
- Region: Arkhangelsk Oblast
- District: Kargopolsky District
- Time zone: UTC+3:00

Solza (Russian: Солза) is a rural locality (a settlement) in Ukhotskoye Rural Settlement of Kargopolsky District, Arkhangelsk Oblast, Russia. The population was 65 as of 2010. There are 6 streets.

== Geography ==
Solza is located 92 km south of Kargopol (the district's administrative centre) by road. Krechetovo is the nearest rural locality.
