= Matnema =

Matnema Матнема
- Village
- Location within Arkhangelsk Oblast Location within Russia
- Coordinates: 62°44′N 41°19′E
- Country: Russia
- Region: Arkhangelsk Oblast
- District: Plesetsky District
- Time zone: UTC+3:00

Matnema (Russian: Матнема) is a rural locality (a village) in Tarasovskoye Rural Settlement of Plesetsky District, Arkhangelsk Oblast, Russia. The population was 15 as of 2010.

== Geography ==
Matnema is located 99 km east of Plesetsk (the district's administrative centre) by road. Kurka Gora is the nearest rural locality.
