= Pochtovoye =

Pochtovoye Почтовое
- Settlement
- Location within Arkhangelsk Oblast Location within Russia
- Coordinates: 63°09′N 42°01′E
- Country: Russia
- Region: Arkhangelsk Oblast
- District: Kholmogorsky District

Population
  - Total: 205
- Time zone: UTC+3:00

Pochtovoye (Russian: Почтовое) is a rural locality (a settlement) in Yemetskoye Rural Settlement of Kholmogorsky District, Arkhangelsk Oblast, Russia. The population was 205 as of 2010.

== Geography ==
Pochtovoye is located 145 km south of Kholmogory (the district's administrative centre) by road. Kalyi is the nearest rural locality.
