= Malaya Lipovka =

Malaya Lipovka Малая Липовка
- Village
- Location within Arkhangelsk Oblast Location within Russia
- Coordinates: 61°30′N 41°51′E
- Country: Russia
- Region: Arkhangelsk Oblast
- District: Velsky District
- Time zone: UTC+3:00

Malaya Lipovka (Russian: Малая Липовка) is a rural locality (a village) and the administrative center of Lipovskoye Rural Settlement of Velsky District, Arkhangelsk Oblast, Russia. The population was 342 as of 2014. There are 6 streets.

== Geography ==
Malaya Lipovka is located 99 km north of Velsk (the district's administrative centre) by road. Zalemenga is the nearest rural locality.
