= Pirinem =

Pirinem Пиринемь
- Village
- Location within Arkhangelsk Oblast Location within Russia
- Coordinates: 64°13′N 44°13′E
- Country: Russia
- Region: Arkhangelsk Oblast
- District: Pinezhsky District
- Time zone: UTC+3:00

Pirinem (Russian: Пиринемь) is a rural locality (a village) in Pinezhsky District, Arkhangelsk Oblast, Russia. The population was 399 as of 2012. There are 9 streets.

== Geography ==
Pirinem is located on the Pinega River, 42 km northwest of Karpogory (the district's administrative centre) by road. Cheshegora is the nearest rural locality.
