= Sergeyevskaya =

Sergeyevskaya Сергеевская
- Village
- Location within Arkhangelsk Oblast Location within Russia
- Coordinates: 62°34′N 43°40′E
- Country: Russia
- Region: Arkhangelsk Oblast
- District: Vinogradovsky District
- Time zone: UTC+3:00

Sergeyevskaya (Russian: Сергеевская) is a rural locality (a village) in Rochegodskoye Rural Settlement of Vinogradovsky District, Arkhangelsk Oblast, Russia. The population was 17 as of 2010.

== Geography ==
Sergeyevskaya is located 64 km southeast of Bereznik (the district's administrative centre) by road. Topsa is the nearest rural locality.
