= Yorkino, Arkhangelsk Oblast =

Yorkino Ёркино
- Village
- Location within Arkhangelsk Oblast Location within Russia
- Coordinates: 63°53′N 44°41′E
- Country: Russia
- Region: Arkhangelsk Oblast
- District: Pinezhsky District
- Time zone: UTC+3:00

Yorkino (Russian: Ёркино) is a rural locality (a village) in Kushkopalskoye Rural Settlement of Pinezhsky District, Arkhangelsk Oblast, Russia. The population was 257 as of 2010. There are 4 streets.

== Geography ==
Yorkino is located on the Pinega River, 24 km southeast of Karpogory (the district's administrative centre) by road. Shardonem is the nearest rural locality.
