= Smolyanskaya =

Smolyanskaya Смольянская
- Village
- Location within Arkhangelsk Oblast Location within Russia
- Coordinates: 61°17′N 41°33′E
- Country: Russia
- Region: Arkhangelsk Oblast
- District: Velsky District
- Time zone: UTC+3:00

Smolyanskaya (Russian: Смольянская) is a rural locality (a village) in Khozminskoye Rural Settlement of Velsky District, Arkhangelsk Oblast, Russia. The population was 100 as of 2014.

== Geography ==
Smolyanskaya is located on the Yelyuga River, 56 km northwest of Velsk (the district's administrative centre) by road. Burtsevskaya is the nearest rural locality.
