= Pogost, Oshevenskoye Rural Settlement =

Pogost Погост
- Village
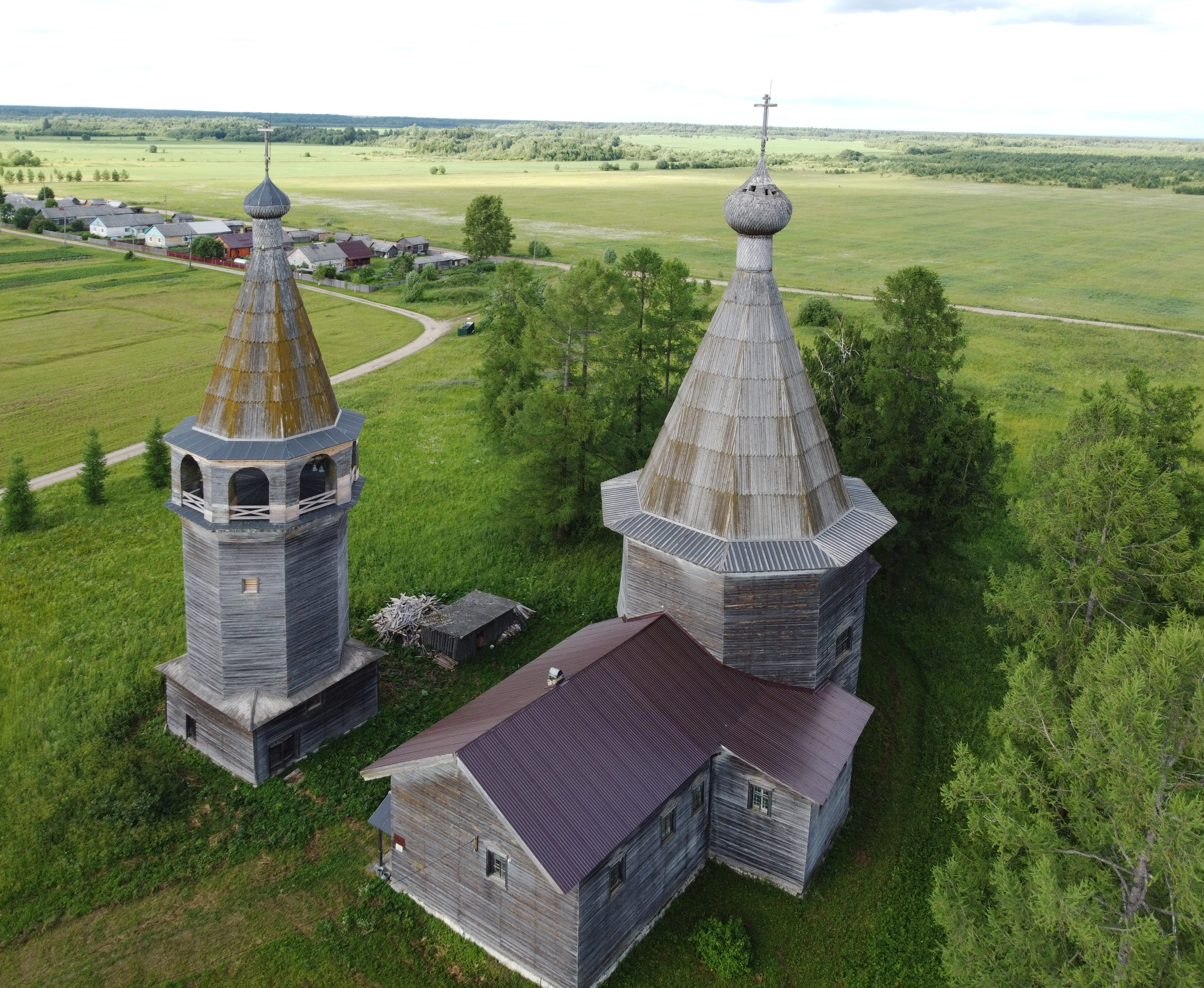
- Church of the Epiphany

- Location within Arkhangelsk Oblast Location within Russia
- Coordinates: 61°52′N 38°48′E
- Country: Russia
- Region: Arkhangelsk Oblast
- District: Kargopolsky District
- Time zone: UTC+3:00

Pogost (Russian: Погост) is a rural locality (a village) in Oshevenskoye Rural Settlement of Kargopolsky District, Arkhangelsk Oblast, Russia. The population was 73 as of 2010.
