= Nikitinskaya =

Nikitinskaya Никитинская
- Village
- Location within Arkhangelsk Oblast Location within Russia
- Coordinates: 61°12′N 41°34′E
- Country: Russia
- Region: Arkhangelsk Oblast
- District: Velsky District
- Time zone: UTC+3:00

Nikitinskaya (Russian: Никитинская) is a rural locality (a village) in Khozminskoye Rural Settlement of Velsky District, Arkhangelsk Oblast, Russia. The population was 24 as of 2014.

== Geography ==
Nikitinskaya is located on the Yelyuga River, 44 km northwest of Velsk (the district's administrative centre) by road. Ispolinovka is the nearest rural locality.
