= Vavchuga =

Vavchuga Вавчуга
- Village
- Location within Arkhangelsk Oblast Location within Russia
- Coordinates: 64°13′N 41°55′E
- Country: Russia
- Region: Arkhangelsk Oblast
- District: Kholmogorsky District

Population (2012)
  - Total: 8
- Time zone: UTC+3:00

Vavchuga (Russian: Вавчуга) is a rural locality (a village) in Kholmogorsky District, Arkhangelsk Oblast, Russia. The population was 8 as of 2012.

== Geography ==
Vavchuga is located 18 km east of Kholmogory (the district's administrative centre) by road. Lubyanki is the nearest rural locality.
