= Una, Arkhangelsk Oblast =

Una Уна
- Village
- Location within Arkhangelsk Oblast Location within Russia
- Coordinates: 64°36′N 38°09′E
- Country: Russia
- Region: Arkhangelsk Oblast
- District: Primorsky District
- Time zone: UTC+3:00

Una (Russian: Уна) is a rural locality (a village) in Pertominskoye Rural Settlement of Primorsky District, Arkhangelsk Oblast, Russia. The population was 69 as of 2010.

== Geography ==
Una is located 151 km west of Arkhangelsk (the district's administrative centre) by road. Luda is the nearest rural locality.
