= Lukinskaya, Verkhnetoyemsky District, Arkhangelsk Oblast =

Lukinskaya Лукинская
- Village
- Location within Arkhangelsk Oblast Location within Russia
- Coordinates: 62°24′N 44°15′E
- Country: Russia
- Region: Arkhangelsk Oblast
- District: Verkhnetoyemsky District
- Time zone: UTC+3:00

Lukinskaya (Russian: Лукинская) is a rural locality (a village) in Verkhnetoyemsky District, Arkhangelsk Oblast, Russia. The population was 26 as of 2010.

== Geography ==
Lukinskaya is located on the Nizhnyaya Toyma River, 62 km northwest of Verkhnyaya Toyma (the district's administrative centre) by road. Mitroninskaya is the nearest rural locality.
