= Pavlovskoye, Lipovsky Selsoviet, Velsky District, Arkhangelsk Oblast =

Pavlovskoye Павловское
- Selo
- Location within Arkhangelsk Oblast Location within Russia
- Coordinates: 61°31′N 42°00′E
- Country: Russia
- Region: Arkhangelsk Oblast
- District: Velsky District
- Time zone: UTC+3:00

Pavlovskoye (Russian: Павловское) is a rural locality (a selo) in Lipovskoye Rural Settlement of Velsky District, Arkhangelsk Oblast, Russia. The population was 9 as of 2014.

== Geography ==
It is located on the Puya River, 91 km north-west from Velsk.
