= Osokorskaya =

Osokorskaya Осокорская
- Village
- Location within Arkhangelsk Oblast Location within Russia
- Coordinates: 61°07′N 46°38′E
- Country: Russia
- Region: Arkhangelsk Oblast
- District: Kotlassky District
- Time zone: UTC+3:00

Osokorskaya (Russian: Осокорская) is a rural locality (a village) in Cheryomushskoye Rural Settlement of Kotlassky District, Arkhangelsk Oblast, Russia. The population was 37 as of 2010. There is 1 street.

== Geography ==
Osokorskaya is located 16 km south of Kotlas (the district's administrative centre) by road. Peschanitsa is the nearest rural locality.
