= Lukino, Kargopolsky District, Arkhangelsk Oblast =

Lukino Лукино
- Village
- Location within Arkhangelsk Oblast Location within Russia
- Coordinates: 61°29′N 38°49′E
- Country: Russia
- Region: Arkhangelsk Oblast
- District: Kargopolsky District
- Time zone: UTC+3:00

Lukino (Russian: Лукино) is a rural locality (a village) in Kargopolsky District, Arkhangelsk Oblast, Russia. The population was 210 as of 2012.
