= Nadruchevskaya =

Nadruchevskaya Надручевская
- Village
- Location within Arkhangelsk Oblast Location within Russia
- Coordinates: 61°08′N 42°48′E
- Country: Russia
- Region: Arkhangelsk Oblast
- District: Velsky District
- Time zone: UTC+3:00

Nadruchevskaya (Russian: Надручевская) is a rural locality (a village) in Rakulo-Kokshengskoye Rural Settlement of Velsky District, Arkhangelsk Oblast, Russia. The population was 8 as of 2014.

== Geography ==
Nadruchevskaya is located 56 km east of Velsk (the district's administrative centre) by road. Ulasovskaya is the nearest rural locality.
