= Odinochka =

Odinochka Одиночка
- Village
- Location within Arkhangelsk Oblast Location within Russia
- Coordinates: 64°35′N 40°26′E
- Country: Russia
- Region: Arkhangelsk Oblast
- District: Primorsky District
- Time zone: UTC+3:00

Odinochka (Russian: Одиночка) is a rural locality (a village) in Ostrovnoye Rural Settlement of Primorsky District, Arkhangelsk Oblast, Russia. The population was 41 as of 2010.

== Geography ==
Odinochka is located on the Ostrovsky island, 16 km northwest of Arkhangelsk (the district's administrative centre) by road. Peski is the nearest rural locality.
