= Verkhneye Shilovo =

Verkhneye Shilovo Верхнее Шилово
- Village
- Location within Arkhangelsk Oblast Location within Russia
- Coordinates: 61°40′N 45°32′E
- Country: Russia
- Region: Arkhangelsk Oblast
- District: Krasnoborsky District
- Time zone: UTC+3:00

Verkhneye Shilovo (Russian: Верхнее Шилово) is a rural locality (a village) in Permogorskoye Rural Settlement, Krasnoborsky District, Arkhangelsk Oblast, Russia. The population was 219 as of 2010. There are 6 streets.

== Geography ==
Verkhneye Shilovo is located 27 km northwest of Krasnoborsk (the district's administrative centre) by road. Lisitsinskaya is the nearest rural locality.
