= Lodygino =

Lodygino Лодыгино
- Village
- Location within Arkhangelsk Oblast Location within Russia
- Coordinates: 61°31′N 39°09′E
- Country: Russia
- Region: Arkhangelsk Oblast
- District: Kargopolsky District
- Time zone: UTC+3:00

Lodygino (Russian: Лодыгино) is a rural locality (a village) in Pavlovskoye Rural Settlement of Kargopolsky District, Arkhangelsk Oblast, Russia. The population was 16 as of 2010.

== Geography ==
Lodygino is located 12 km east of Kargopol (the district's administrative centre) by road. Kazakovo is the nearest rural locality.
