= Yurmala, Arkhangelsk Oblast =

Yurmala Юрмала
- Village
- Location within Arkhangelsk Oblast Location within Russia
- Coordinates: 62°48′N 41°10′E
- Country: Russia
- Region: Arkhangelsk Oblast
- District: Plesetsky District
- Time zone: UTC+3:00

Yurmala (Russian: Юрмала) is a rural locality (a village) in Plesetsky District, Arkhangelsk Oblast, Russia. The population was 21 as of 2012.

== Geography ==
Yurmala is located on the Puksa River, 114 km east of Plesetsk (the district's administrative centre) by road. Yakshina is the nearest rural locality.
