= Nadozerye =

Nadozerye Надозерье
- Village
- Location within Arkhangelsk Oblast Location within Russia
- Coordinates: 63°00′N 42°31′E
- Country: Russia
- Region: Arkhangelsk Oblast
- District: Vinogradovsky District
- Time zone: UTC+3:00

Nadozerye (Russian: Надозерье) is a rural locality (a village) in Morzhegorskoye Rural Settlement of Vinogradovsky District, Arkhangelsk Oblast, Russia. The population was 11 as of 2010.

== Geography ==
It is located on the Talto Lake, 25 km northwest of Bereznik (the district's administrative centre) by road. Uyta is the nearest rural locality.
