= Moleprovod =

Moleprovod Молепровод
- Village
- Location within Arkhangelsk Oblast Location within Russia
- Coordinates: 62°51′N 42°44′E
- Country: Russia
- Region: Arkhangelsk Oblast
- District: Vinogradovsky District
- Time zone: UTC+3:00

Moleprovod (Russian: Молепровод) is a rural locality (a village) in Osinovskoye Rural Settlement of Vinogradovsky District, Arkhangelsk Oblast, Russia. The population was 1 as of 2010.

== Geography ==
Moleprovod is located on the Severnaya Dvina River, 2 km northeast of Bereznik (the district's administrative centre) by road. Bereznik is the nearest rural locality.
