= Ovsyannikovskaya =

Ovsyannikovskaya Овсянниковская
- Village
- Location within Arkhangelsk Oblast Location within Russia
- Coordinates: 61°06′01″N 42°10′34″E
- Country: Russia
- Region: Arkhangelsk Oblast
- District: Velsky District
- Time zone: UTC+3:00

Ovsyannikovskaya (Russian: Овсянниковская) is a rural locality (a village) in Argunovskoye Rural Settlement of Velsky District, Arkhangelsk Oblast, Russia. The population was 51 as of 2014.

== Geography ==
Ovsyannikovskaya is located on the Vaga River, 10 km northeast of Velsk (the district's administrative centre) by road. Luchinskaya is the nearest rural locality.
