= Shurenga =

Shurenga Шуреньга
- Village
- Location within Arkhangelsk Oblast Location within Russia
- Coordinates: 62°16′N 39°29′E
- Country: Russia
- Region: Arkhangelsk Oblast
- District: Plesetsky District
- Time zone: UTC+3:00

Shurenga (Russian: Шуреньга) is a rural locality (a village) in Plesetsky District, Arkhangelsk Oblast, Russia. The population was 178 as of 2010.

== Geography ==
Shurenga is located 71 km southwest of Plesetsk (the district's administrative centre) by road. Trufanovskaya is the nearest rural locality.
