= Khorkovo =

Khorkovo Хорьково
- Village
- Location within Arkhangelsk Oblast Location within Russia
- Coordinates: 64°22′N 41°01′E
- Country: Russia
- Region: Arkhangelsk Oblast
- District: Primorsky District
- Time zone: UTC+3:00

Khorkovo (Russian: Хорьково) is a rural locality (a village) and the administrative center of Lyavlenskoye Rural Settlement of Primorsky District, Arkhangelsk Oblast, Russia. The population was 341 as of 2010.

== Geography ==
Khorkovo is located 34 km southeast of Arkhangelsk (the district's administrative centre) by road. Novinki is the nearest rural locality.
