= Morshikhinskaya =

Morshikhinskaya Моршихинская
- Village
- Location within Arkhangelsk Oblast Location within Russia
- Coordinates: 62°43′N 43°16′E
- Country: Russia
- Region: Arkhangelsk Oblast
- District: Vinogradovsky District
- Time zone: UTC+3:00

Morshikhinskaya (Russian: Моршихинская) is a rural locality (a village) in Vinogradovsky District, Arkhangelsk Oblast, Russia. The population was 12 as of 2010.

== Geography ==
Morshikhinskaya is located on the Severnaya Dvina River, 35 km (22 mi) southeast of Bereznik (the district's administrative centre) by road. Artyushinskaya is the nearest rural locality.
