= Kvakhtyuga =

Kvakhtyuga Квахтюга
- Settlement
- Location within Arkhangelsk Oblast Location within Russia
- Coordinates: 62°54′N 43°07′E
- Country: Russia
- Region: Arkhangelsk Oblast
- District: Vinogradovsky District
- Time zone: UTC+3:00

Kvakhtyuga (Russian: Квахтюга) is a rural locality (a settlement) in Osinovskoye Rural Settlement of Vinogradovsky District, Arkhangelsk Oblast, Russia. The population was 86 as of 2010. There are 7 streets.

== Geography ==
Kvakhtyuga is located on the Vayenga River, 30 km northeast of Bereznik (the district's administrative centre) by road. Verkhnyaya Vayenga is the nearest rural locality.
