= Khozmino =

Khozmino Хозьмино
- Settlement
- Location within Arkhangelsk Oblast Location within Russia
- Coordinates: 61°11′N 41°36′E
- Country: Russia
- Region: Arkhangelsk Oblast
- District: Velsky District
- Time zone: UTC+3:00

Khozmino (Russian: Хозьмино) is a rural locality (a settlement) and the administrative center of Khozminskoye Rural Settlement of Velsky District, Arkhangelsk Oblast, Russia. The population was 456 as of 2014. There are 9 streets.

== Geography ==
Khozmino is located on the Vel River, 42 km northwest of Velsk (the district's administrative centre) by road. Ispolinovka is the nearest rural locality.
