= Gorodok, Vinogradovsky District, Arkhangelsk Oblast =

Gorodok Городок
- Village
- Location within Arkhangelsk Oblast Location within Russia
- Coordinates: 62°30′N 43°51′E
- Country: Russia
- Region: Arkhangelsk Oblast
- District: Vinogradovsky District
- Time zone: UTC+3:00

Gorodok (Russian: Городок) is a rural locality (a village) in Boretskoye Rural Settlement of Vinogradovsky District, Arkhangelsk Oblast, Russia. The population was 41 as of 2010.

== Geography ==
Gorodok is located on the Tyoda River, 77 km southeast of Bereznik (the district's administrative centre) by road. Ostrovetskaya is the nearest rural locality.
