= Neklyudovskaya =

Neklyudovskaya Неклюдовская
- Village
- Location within Arkhangelsk Oblast Location within Russia
- Coordinates: 61°05′N 42°10′E
- Country: Russia
- Region: Arkhangelsk Oblast
- District: Velsky District
- Time zone: UTC+3:00

Neklyudovskaya (Russian: Неклюдовская) is a rural locality (a village) in Argunovskoye Rural Settlement of Velsky District, Arkhangelsk Oblast, Russia. The population was 117 as of 2014. There is 1 street.

== Geography ==
Neklyudovskaya is located on the Vaga River, 8 km northeast of Velsk (the district's administrative centre) by road. Argunovsky is the nearest rural locality.
