= Korelskoye =

Korelskoye Корельское
- Village
- Location within Arkhangelsk Oblast Location within Russia
- Coordinates: 63°41′N 38°35′E
- Country: Russia
- Region: Arkhangelsk Oblast
- District: Onezhsky District
- Time zone: UTC+3:00

Korelskoye (Russian: Корельское) is a rural locality (a village) in Porozhskoye Rural Settlement of Onezhsky District, Arkhangelsk Oblast, Russia. The population was 4 as of 2010.

== Geography ==
Korelskoye is located 26 km southeast of Onega (the district's administrative centre) by road. Porog is the nearest rural locality.
