= Sibir, Arkhangelsk Oblast =

Sibir Сибирь
- Village
- Location within Arkhangelsk Oblast Location within Russia
- Coordinates: 62°04′N 40°12′E
- Country: Russia
- Region: Arkhangelsk Oblast
- District: Nyandomsky District
- Time zone: UTC+3:00

Sibir (Russian: Сибирь) is a rural locality (a village) in Shalakushskoye Rural Settlement of Nyandomsky District, Arkhangelsk Oblast, Russia. The population was 7 as of 2010. There is 1 street.

== Geography ==
Sibir is located 64 km north of Nyandoma (the district's administrative centre) by road. Mezhdudvorye is the nearest rural locality.
