= Artemkovskaya =

Artemkovskaya Артемковская
- Village
- Location within Arkhangelsk Oblast Location within Russia
- Coordinates: 61°20′N 42°05′E
- Country: Russia
- Region: Arkhangelsk Oblast
- District: Velsky District
- Time zone: UTC+3:00

Artemkovskaya (Russian: Артемковская) is a rural locality (a village) in Pakshengskoye Rural Settlement of Velsky District, Arkhangelsk Oblast, Russia. The population was 145 as of 2014.

== Geography ==
Artemkovskaya is located 39 km north of Velsk (the district's administrative centre) by road. Yefremkovskaya is the nearest rural locality.
