= Pasva =

Pasva Пасьва
- Settlement
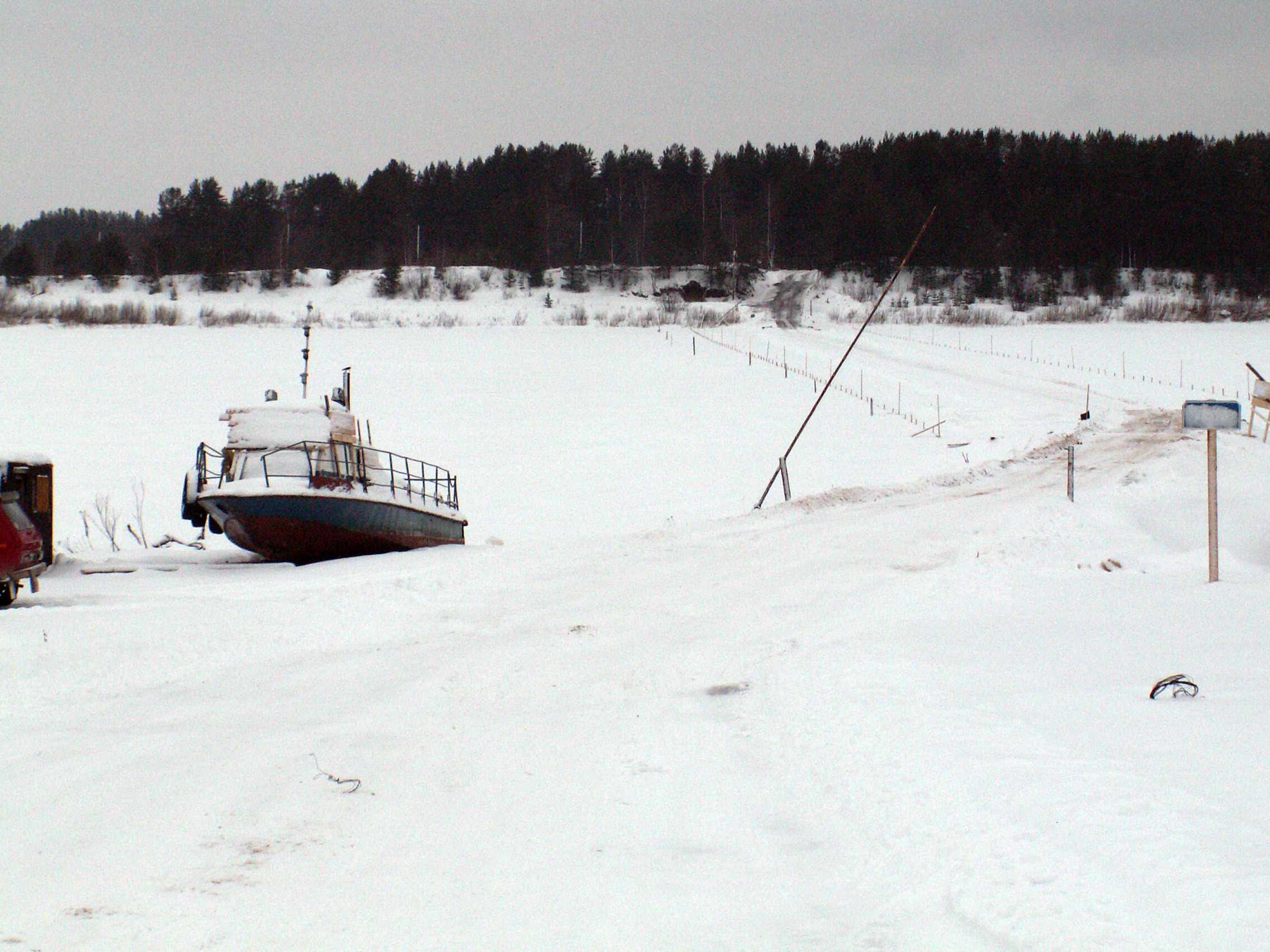

- Location within Arkhangelsk Oblast Location within Russia
- Coordinates: 61°35′N 42°42′E
- Country: Russia
- Region: Arkhangelsk Oblast
- District: Velsky District
- Time zone: UTC+3:00

Pasva (Russian: Пасьва) is a rural locality (a settlement) and the administrative center of Poponavolotskoye Rural Settlement of Velsky District, Arkhangelsk Oblast, Russia. The population was 1,384 as of 2014. There are 21 streets.

== Geography ==
Pasva is located 93 km northeast of Velsk (the district's administrative centre) by road. Levkovo is the nearest rural locality.
