= Bolshoy Bor =

Bolshoy Bor Большой Бор
- Village
- Location within Arkhangelsk Oblast Location within Russia
- Coordinates: 63°36′N 39°07′E
- Country: Russia
- Region: Arkhangelsk Oblast
- District: Onezhsky District
- Time zone: UTC+3:00

Bolshoy Bor (Russian: Большой Бор) is a rural locality (a village) in Chekuyevskoye Rural Settlement of Onezhsky District, Arkhangelsk Oblast, Russia. The population was 306 as of 2010. There are 8 streets.

== Geography ==
Bolshoy Bor is located on the Kodina River, 80 km southeast of Onega (the district's administrative centre) by road. Pavlovsky Bor is the nearest rural locality.
