= Denislavye =

Denislavye Дениславье
- Selo
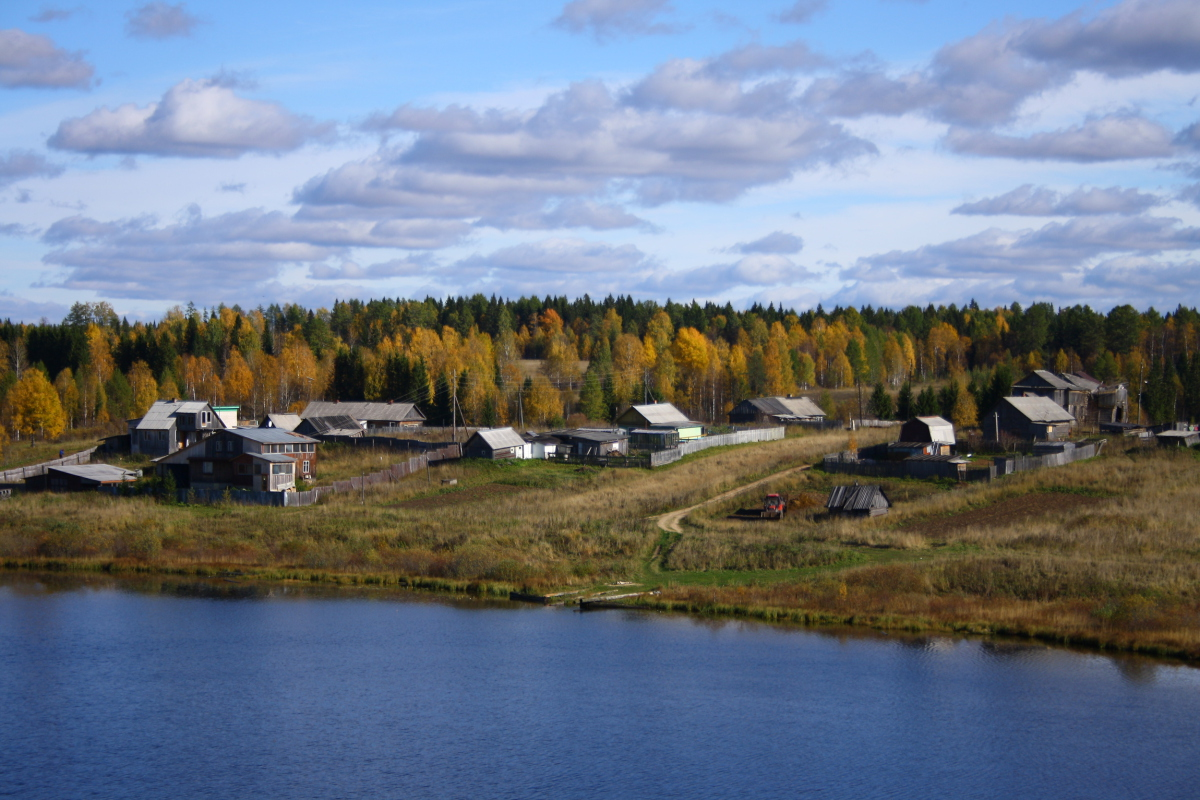
- View of the settlement in 2010

- Location within Arkhangelsk Oblast Location within Russia
- Coordinates: 62°35′N 40°03′E
- Country: Russia
- Region: Arkhangelsk Oblast
- District: Plesetsky District
- Time zone: UTC+3:00

Denislavye (Russian: Дениславье) is a rural locality (a selo) in Oksovskoye Rural Settlement of Plesetsky District, Arkhangelsk Oblast, Russia. The population was 38 as of 2010.

== Geography ==
Denislavye is located 21 km southwest of Plesetsk (the district's administrative centre) by road. Novostroyka is the nearest rural locality.
