= Fedotovskaya =

Fedotovskaya Федотовская
- Village
- Location within Arkhangelsk Oblast Location within Russia
- Coordinates: 61°24′N 46°16′E
- Country: Russia
- Region: Arkhangelsk Oblast
- District: Kotlassky District
- Time zone: UTC+3:00

Fedotovskaya (Russian: Федотовская) is a rural locality (a village) in Kotlassky District, Arkhangelsk Oblast, Russia. The population was 613 as of 2010. There are 9 streets.

== Geography ==
Fedotovskaya is located on the Severnaya Dvina River, 39 km northwest of Kotlas (the district's administrative centre) by road. Kharitonovo is the nearest rural locality.
