= Savvatiya =

Savvatiya Савватия
- Settlement
- Location within Arkhangelsk Oblast Location within Russia
- Coordinates: 60°59′N 46°47′E
- Country: Russia
- Region: Arkhangelsk Oblast
- District: Kotlassky District
- Time zone: UTC+3:00

Savvatiya (Russian: Савватия) is a rural locality (a settlement) in Cheryomushskoye Rural Settlement of Kotlassky District, Arkhangelsk Oblast, Russia. The population was 1,740 as of 2010. There are 14 streets.

== Geography ==
Savvatiya is located 38 km south of Kotlas (the district's administrative centre) by road. Berezovy is the nearest rural locality.
