= Verkhnyaya Kitsa =

Verkhnyaya Kitsa Верхняя Кица
- Village
- Location within Arkhangelsk Oblast Location within Russia
- Coordinates: 62°34′N 42°56′E
- Country: Russia
- Region: Arkhangelsk Oblast
- District: Vinogradovsky District
- Time zone: UTC+3:00

Verkhnyaya Kitsa (Russian: Верхняя Кица) is a rural locality (a village) in Vinogradovsky District, Arkhangelsk Oblast, Russia. The population was 116 as of 2010. There are 4 streets.

== Geography ==
Verkhnyaya Kitsa is located on the Vaga River, 41 km south of Bereznik (the district's administrative centre) by road. Bereznichek is the nearest rural locality.
