= Tarasikha =

Tarasikha Тарасиха
- Village
- Location within Arkhangelsk Oblast Location within Russia
- Coordinates: 62°47′N 41°10′E
- Country: Russia
- Region: Arkhangelsk Oblast
- District: Plesetsky District
- Time zone: UTC+3:00

Tarasikha (Russian: Тарасиха) is a rural locality (a village) in Plesetsky District, Arkhangelsk Oblast, Russia. The population was 1 as of 2010.

== Geography ==
Tarasikha is located 115 km east of Plesetsk (the district's administrative centre) by road. Monastyr is the nearest rural locality.
