= Kyanda =

Kyanda Кянда
- Village
- Location within Arkhangelsk Oblast Location within Russia
- Coordinates: 64°17′N 38°05′E
- Country: Russia
- Region: Arkhangelsk Oblast
- District: Onezhsky District
- Time zone: UTC+3:00

Kyanda (Russian: Кянда) is a rural locality (a village) in Pokrovskoye Rural Settlement of Onezhsky District, Arkhangelsk Oblast, Russia. The population was 120 as of 2010. There are 3 streets.

== Geography ==
Kyanda is located 54 km north of Onega (the district's administrative centre) by road. Tamitsa is the nearest rural locality.
