= Andreyev Pochinok =

Andreyev Pochinok Андреев Починок
- Village
- Location within Arkhangelsk Oblast Location within Russia
- Coordinates: 61°40′N 43°49′E
- Country: Russia
- Region: Arkhangelsk Oblast
- District: Ustyansky District
- Time zone: UTC+3:00

Andreyev Pochinok (Russian: Андреев Починок) is a rural locality (a village) in Ustyansky District, Arkhangelsk Oblast, Russia. The population was 4 as of 2010.

== Geography ==
It is located on the Veryuga River, 100 km from Oktyabrsky.
