= Berezonavolok =

Berezonavolok Березонаволок
- Villagesigma
- Location within Arkhangelsk Oblast Location within Russia
- Coordinates: 61°36′N 46°23′E
- Country: Russia
- Region: Arkhangelsk Oblast
- District: Krasnoborsky District
- Time zone: UTC+3:00

Berezonavolok (Russian: Березонаволок) is a rural locality (a village) in Verkhneuftyugskoye Rural Settlement, Krasnoborsky District, Arkhangelsk Oblast, Russia. The population was 134 as of 2010, and there are 14 streets.

== Geography ==
Berezonavolok is located 36 km east of Krasnoborsk (the district's administrative centre) by road. Zavasevskaya is the nearest rural locality.
