= Larionovskaya =

Larionovskaya Ларионовская
- Village
- Location within Arkhangelsk Oblast Location within Russia
- Coordinates: 62°19′N 44°39′E
- Country: Russia
- Region: Arkhangelsk Oblast
- District: Verkhnetoyemsky District
- Time zone: UTC+3:00

Larionovskaya (Russian: Ларионовская) is a rural locality (a village) in Verkhnetoyemsky District, Arkhangelsk Oblast, Russia. The population was 3 as of 2010.

== Geography ==
Larionovskaya is located on the Severnaya Dvina River, 29 km northwest of Verkhnyaya Toyma (the district's administrative centre) by road. Zelennik is the nearest rural locality.
