= Skoryukovo =

Skoryukovo Скорюково
- Village
- Location within Arkhangelsk Oblast Location within Russia
- Coordinates: 61°05′N 38°34′E
- Country: Russia
- Region: Arkhangelsk Oblast
- District: Kargopolsky District
- Time zone: UTC+3:00

Skoryukovo (Russian: Скорюково) is a rural locality (a village) in Kargopolsky District, Arkhangelsk Oblast, Russia. The population was 29 as of 2010. There are 2 streets.

== Geography ==
Skoryukovo is located 64 km south of Kargopol (the district's administrative centre) by road. Nikiforovo is the nearest rural locality.
