= Zubarevskaya =

Zubarevskaya Зубаревская
- Village
- Location within Arkhangelsk Oblast Location within Russia
- Coordinates: 60°53′N 43°15′E
- Country: Russia
- Region: Arkhangelsk Oblast
- District: Ustyansky District
- Time zone: UTC+3:00

Zubarevskaya (Russian: Зубаревская) is a rural locality (a village) in Rostovsko-Minskoye Rural Settlement of Ustyansky District, Arkhangelsk Oblast, Russia. The population was 3 as of 2010.

== Geography ==
Zubarevskaya is located 34 km south of Oktyabrsky (the district's administrative centre) by road. Zayachevskaya is the nearest rural locality.
