= Avnyugsky =

Avnyugsky Авнюгский
- Settlement
- Location within Arkhangelsk Oblast Location within Russia
- Coordinates: 61°59′N 45°05′E
- Country: Russia
- Region: Arkhangelsk Oblast
- District: Verkhnetoyemsky District
- Time zone: UTC+3:00

Avnyugsky (Russian: Авнюгский) is a rural locality (a settlement) and the administrative center of Fedkovskoye Rural Settlement of Verkhnetoyemsky District, Arkhangelsk Oblast, Russia. The population was 1,183 as of 2010. There are 16 streets.

== Geography ==
Avnyugsky is located on the Severnaya Dvina River, 33 km south of Verkhnyaya Toyma (the district's administrative centre) by road. Avnyuga-Posadochnaya is the nearest rural locality.
