= Pogost (Khavrogorsky Selsoviet) =

Pogost Погост
- Village
- Location within Arkhangelsk Oblast Location within Russia
- Coordinates: 63°31′N 41°54′E
- Country: Russia
- Region: Arkhangelsk Oblast
- District: Kholmogorsky District

Population
  - Total: 7
- Time zone: UTC+3:00

Pogost (Russian: Погост) is a rural locality (a village) in Khavrogorskoye Rural Settlement of Kholmogorsky District, Arkhangelsk Oblast, Russia. The population was 7 as of 2010.

== Geography ==
The Village is located on the Pingisha River.
