= Pershinskaya =

Pershinskaya Першинская
- Village
- Location within Arkhangelsk Oblast Location within Russia
- Coordinates: 61°14′N 42°07′E
- Country: Russia
- Region: Arkhangelsk Oblast
- District: Velsky District
- Time zone: UTC+3:00

Pershinskaya (Russian: Першинская) is a rural locality (a village) in Muravyovskoye Rural Settlement of Velsky District, Arkhangelsk Oblast, Russia. The population was 14 as of 2014.

== Geography ==
It is located on the Bolshaya Churga River, 17 km from Voronovskaya.
