= Pushlakhta =

Pushlakhta Пушлахта
- Village
- Location within Arkhangelsk Oblast Location within Russia
- Coordinates: 64°48′N 36°34′E
- Country: Russia
- Region: Arkhangelsk Oblast
- District: Primorsky District
- Time zone: UTC+3:00

Pushlakhta (Russian: Пушлахта) is a rural locality (a village) in Pertominskoye Rural Settlement of Primorsky District, Arkhangelsk Oblast, Russia. The population was 54 as of 2010.

== Geography ==
Pushlakhta is located 284 km west of Arkhangelsk (the district's administrative centre) by road.

== History ==
In July 1854, during the Crimean War, allied troops landed at Pushlakhta and defeated the village's militia in a short battle. After this, the allies burned most of the village.
