= Gorodetsk, Arkhangelsk Oblast =

Gorodetsk Городецк
- Village
- Location within Arkhangelsk Oblast Location within Russia
- Coordinates: 63°34′N 45°41′E
- Country: Russia
- Region: Arkhangelsk Oblast
- District: Pinezhsky District
- Time zone: UTC+3:00

Gorodetsk (Russian: Городецк) is a rural locality (a village) in Surskoye Rural Settlement of Pinezhsky District, Arkhangelsk Oblast, Russia. The population was 313 as of 2010. There are 6 streets.

== Geography ==
Gorodetsk is located on the Mysovaya River, 93 km southeast of Karpogory (the district's administrative centre) by road. Ostrov is the nearest rural locality.
