= Gar, Arkhangelsk Oblast =

Gar Гарь
- Village
- Location within Arkhangelsk Oblast Location within Russia
- Coordinates: 61°55′N 38°47′E
- Country: Russia
- Region: Arkhangelsk Oblast
- District: Kargopolsky District
- Time zone: UTC+3:00

Gar (Russian: Гарь) is a rural locality (a village) in Kargopolsky District, Arkhangelsk Oblast, Russia. The population was 15 as of 2012.

== Geography ==
Gar is located 54 km north of Kargopol (the district's administrative centre) by road. Shiryaikha is the nearest rural locality.
