= Shotova =

Shotova Шотова
- Village
- Location within Arkhangelsk Oblast Location within Russia
- Coordinates: 64°00′N 44°20′E
- Country: Russia
- Region: Arkhangelsk Oblast
- District: Pinezhsky District
- Time zone: UTC+3:00

Shotova (Russian: Шотова) is a rural locality (a village) in Karpogorskoye Rural Settlement of Pinezhsky District, Arkhangelsk Oblast, Russia. The population was 429 as of 2010. There are 12 streets.

== Geography ==
Shotova is located on the Pinega River, 6 km west of Karpogory (the district's administrative centre) by road. Karpogory is the nearest rural locality.
