= Pole, Arkhangelsk Oblast =

Pole Поле
- Village
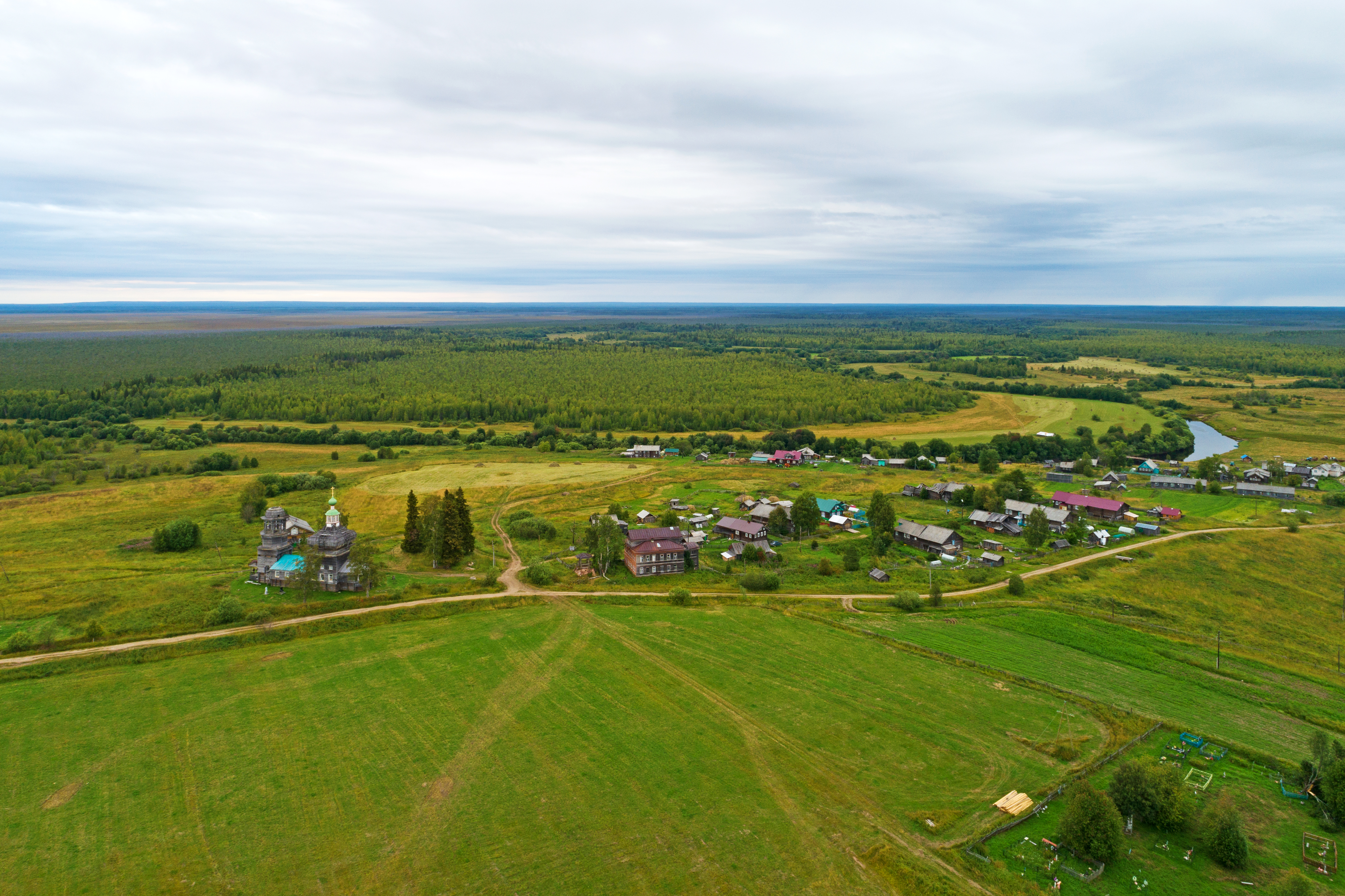

- Location within Arkhangelsk Oblast Location within Russia
- Coordinates: 63°37′N 39°15′E
- Country: Russia
- Region: Arkhangelsk Oblast
- District: Onezhsky District
- Time zone: UTC+3:00

Pole (Russian: Поле) is a rural locality (a village) in Chekuyevskoye Rural Settlement of Onezhsky District, Arkhangelsk Oblast, Russia. The population was 82 as of 2010.

== Geography ==
Pole is located on the Kodina River, 89 km southeast of Onega (the district's administrative centre) by road. Bolshoy Bor is the nearest rural locality.
