= Mitinskaya =

Mitinskaya Митинская
- Village
- Location within Arkhangelsk Oblast Location within Russia
- Coordinates: 61°07′N 43°36′E
- Country: Russia
- Region: Arkhangelsk Oblast
- District: Ustyansky District
- Time zone: UTC+3:00

Mitinskaya (Russian: Митинская) is a rural locality (a village) in Orlovskoye Rural Settlement of Ustyansky District, Arkhangelsk Oblast, Russia. The population was 25 as of 2010.

== Geography ==
Mitinskaya is located on the Ustya River, 31 km east of Oktyabrsky (the district's administrative centre) by road. Koptyayevskaya is the nearest rural locality.
