= Shvakino =

Shvakino Швакино
- Settlement
- Location within Arkhangelsk Oblast Location within Russia
- Coordinates: 63°32′18″N 40°06′21″E
- Country: Russia
- Region: Arkhangelsk Oblast
- District: Plesetsky District
- Time zone: UTC+3:00

Shvakino (Russian: Швакино) is a rural locality (a settlement) in Obozerskoye Rural Settlement of Plesetsky District, Arkhangelsk Oblast, Russia. The population was 105 as of 2010. There are 2 streets.

== Geography ==
Shvakino is located 132 km north of Plesetsk (the district's administrative centre) by road. Uromets is the nearest rural locality.
