= Basharovo =

Basharovo Башарово
- Village
- Location within Arkhangelsk Oblast Location within Russia
- Coordinates: 61°06′N 46°39′E
- Country: Russia
- Region: Arkhangelsk Oblast
- District: Kotlassky District
- Time zone: UTC+3:00

Basharovo (Russian: Башарово) is a rural locality (a village) in Cheremushksoye Rural Settlement, Kotlassky District, Arkhangelsk Oblast, Russia. The population was 2 as of 2012. There are 3 streets.

== Geography ==
Basharovo is located on the Basharovka River, 18 km south of Kotlas (the district's administrative centre) by road. Chupanovo is the nearest rural locality.
