= Ryazanovo =

Ryazanovo Рязаново
- Settlement
- Location within Arkhangelsk Oblast Location within Russia
- Coordinates: 63°01′N 42°22′E
- Country: Russia
- Region: Arkhangelsk Oblast
- District: Vinogradovsky District
- Time zone: UTC+3:00

Ryazanovo (Russian: Рязаново) is a rural locality (a settlement) in Vinogradovsky District, Arkhangelsk Oblast, Russia. The population was 333 as of 2010. There is 1 street.

== Geography ==
Ryazanovo is located on the Severnaya Dvina River, 31 km northwest of Bereznik (the district's administrative centre) by road. Khetovo is the nearest rural locality.
