= Prilutskaya =

Prilutskaya Прилуцкая
- Village
- Location within Arkhangelsk Oblast Location within Russia
- Coordinates: 61°04′N 41°58′E
- Country: Russia
- Region: Arkhangelsk Oblast
- District: Velsky District
- Time zone: UTC+3:00

Prilutskaya (Russian: Прилуцкая) is a rural locality (a village) in Ust-Velskoye Rural Settlement of Velsky District, Arkhangelsk Oblast, Russia. The population was 331 as of 2014. There are 4 streets.

== Geography ==
Prilutskaya is located on the Vel River, 9 km west of Velsk (the district's administrative centre) by road. Silyutinsky is the nearest rural locality.
