= Shilenga =

Shilenga Шиленьга
- Village
- Location within Arkhangelsk Oblast Location within Russia
- Coordinates: 62°49′N 42°56′E
- Country: Russia
- Region: Arkhangelsk Oblast
- District: Vinogradovsky District
- Time zone: UTC+3:00

Shilenga (Russian: Шиленьга) is a rural locality (a village) in Osinovskoye Rural Settlement of Vinogradovsky District, Arkhangelsk Oblast, Russia. The population was 5 as of 2010.

== Geography ==
Shilenga is located 14 km southeast of Bereznik (the district's administrative centre) by road. Priluk is the nearest rural locality.
