= Argunovskaya =

Argunovskaya Аргуновская
- Village
- Location within Arkhangelsk Oblast Location within Russia
- Coordinates: 61°04′N 42°09′E
- Country: Russia
- Region: Arkhangelsk Oblast
- District: Velsky District
- Time zone: UTC+3:00

Argunovskaya (Russian: Аргуновская) is a rural locality (a village) in Argunovskoye Rural Settlement of Velsky District, Arkhangelsk Oblast, Russia. The population was 133 as of 2014. There are 2 streets.

== Geography ==
Argunovskaya is located on the Vaga River, 7 km east of Velsk (the district's administrative centre) by road. Argunovsky is the nearest rural locality.
