= Nikitinskaya, Vinogradovsky District, Arkhangelsk Oblast =

Nikitinskaya Никитинская
- Village
- Location within Arkhangelsk Oblast Location within Russia
- Coordinates: 62°37′N 43°36′E
- Country: Russia
- Region: Arkhangelsk Oblast
- District: Vinogradovsky District
- Time zone: UTC+3:00

Nikitinskaya (Russian: Никитинская) is a rural locality (a village) in Vinogradovsky District, Arkhangelsk Oblast, Russia. The population was 5 as of 2010. There are 2 streets.

== Geography ==
Nikitinskaya is located on the Topsa River, 57 km southeast of Bereznik (the district's administrative centre) by road. Nizhnyaya Topsa is the nearest rural locality.
