= Antonovskaya =

Antonovskaya Антоновская
- Village
- Location within Arkhangelsk Oblast Location within Russia
- Coordinates: 62°47′N 43°08′E
- Country: Russia
- Region: Arkhangelsk Oblast
- District: Vinogradovsky District
- Time zone: UTC+3:00

Antonovskaya (Russian: Антоновская) is a rural locality (a village) in Osinovskoye Rural Settlement, Vinogradovsky District, Arkhangelsk Oblast, Russia. The population was 17 as of 2010.

== Geography ==
Antonovskaya is located on the Severnaya Dvina River, 25 km southeast of Bereznik (the district's administrative centre) by road. Rostovskoye is the nearest rural locality.
