= Timoshinskaya =

Timoshinskaya Тимошинская
- Village
- Location within Arkhangelsk Oblast Location within Russia
- Coordinates: 61°13′N 38°52′E
- Country: Russia
- Region: Arkhangelsk Oblast
- District: Kargopolsky District
- Time zone: UTC+3:00

Timoshinskaya (Russian: Тимошинская) is a rural locality (a village) in Kargopolsky District, Arkhangelsk Oblast, Russia. The population was 7 as of 2012. There are 2 streets.

== Geography ==
Timoshinskaya is located 39 km south of Kargopol (the district's administrative centre) by road. Belaya is the nearest rural locality.
