= Bolshoy Khaluy =

Bolshoy Khaluy Большой Халуй
- Village
- Location within Arkhangelsk Oblast Location within Russia
- Coordinates: 61°52′N 38°42′E
- Country: Russia
- Region: Arkhangelsk Oblast
- District: Kargopolsky District
- Time zone: UTC+3:00

Bolshoy Khaluy (Russian: Большой Халуй) is a rural locality (a village) in Oshevenskoye Rural Settlement of Kargopolsky District, Arkhangelsk Oblast, Russia. The population was 14 as of 2010.

== Geography ==
Bolshoy Khaluy is located 51 km north of Kargopol (the district's administrative centre) by road. Shiryaikha is the nearest rural locality.
