= Ust-Vayenga =

Ust-Vayenga Усть-Ваеньга
- Settlement
- Location within Arkhangelsk Oblast Location within Russia
- Coordinates: 63°00′N 42°37′E
- Country: Russia
- Region: Arkhangelsk Oblast
- District: Vinogradovsky District
- Time zone: UTC+3:00

Ust-Vayenga (Russian: Усть-Ваеньга) is a rural locality (a settlement) and the administrative center of Ust-Vayengskoye Rural Settlement of Vinogradovsky District, Arkhangelsk Oblast, Russia. The population was 964 as of 2010. There are 15 streets.

== Geography ==
Ust-Vayenga is located 22 km north of Bereznik (the district's administrative centre) by road.
