= Shosheltsy =

Shosheltsy Шошельцы
- Settlement
- Location within Arkhangelsk Oblast Location within Russia
- Coordinates: 62°31′N 44°23′E
- Country: Russia
- Region: Arkhangelsk Oblast
- District: Vinogradovsky District
- Time zone: UTC+3:00

Shosheltsy (Russian: Шошельцы) is a rural locality (a settlement) in Boretskoye Rural Settlement of Vinogradovsky District, Arkhangelsk Oblast, Russia. The population was 75 as of 2010.

== Geography ==
Shosheltsy is located on the Nizhnyaya Toyma River, 189 km southeast of Bereznik (the district's administrative centre) by road. Georgiyevskaya is the nearest rural locality.
