= Chizhgora =

Chizhgora Чижгора
- Village
- Location within Arkhangelsk Oblast Location within Russia
- Coordinates: 65°17′N 43°56′E
- Country: Russia
- Region: Arkhangelsk Oblast
- District: Mezensky District
- Time zone: UTC+3:00

Chizhgora (Russian: Чижгора) is a rural locality (a village) in Mezensky District, Arkhangelsk Oblast, Russia. The population was 151 as of 2010. There are 4 streets.

== Geography ==
Chizhgora is located on the Sova River, 97 km south of Mezen (the district's administrative centre) by road.
