= Kulikovskaya =

Kulikovskaya Куликовская
- Village
- Location within Arkhangelsk Oblast Location within Russia
- Coordinates: 62°30′N 42°47′E
- Country: Russia
- Region: Arkhangelsk Oblast
- District: Shenkursky District
- Time zone: UTC+3:00

Kulikovskaya (Russian: Куликовская) is a rural locality (a village) in Syumskoye Rural Settlement of Shenkursky District, Arkhangelsk Oblast, Russia. The population was 163 as of 2010. There are 10 streets.

== Geography ==
Kulikovskaya is located 62 km north of Shenkursk (the district's administrative centre) by road. Lekhovskaya is the nearest rural locality.
