= Bolshoye Krotovo =

Bolshoye Krotovo Большое Кротово
- Village
- Location within Arkhangelsk Oblast Location within Russia
- Coordinates: 63°55′N 44°12′E
- Country: Russia
- Region: Arkhangelsk Oblast
- District: Pinezhsky District
- Time zone: UTC+3:00

Bolshoye Krotovo (Russian: Большое Кротово) is a rural locality (a village) in Pinezhsky District, Arkhangelsk Oblast, Russia. The population was 39 as of 2012.

== Geography ==
Bolshoye Krotovo is located 21 km northeast of Karpogory (the district's administrative centre) by road. Vaymusha is the nearest rural locality.
