= Lipakovo =

Lipakovo Липаково
- Settlement
- Location within Arkhangelsk Oblast Location within Russia
- Coordinates: 62°24′N 39°41′E
- Country: Russia
- Region: Arkhangelsk Oblast
- District: Plesetsky District
- Time zone: UTC+3:00

Lipakovo (Russian: Липаково) is a rural locality (a settlement) in Fedovskoye Rural Settlement of Plesetsky District, Arkhangelsk Oblast, Russia. The population was 356 as of 2010. There are 9 streets.

== Geography ==
Lipakovo is located on the Onega River, 55 km southwest of Plesetsk (the district's administrative centre) by road. Onega is the nearest rural locality.
