= Yukhnevo =

Yukhnevo Юхнево
- Village
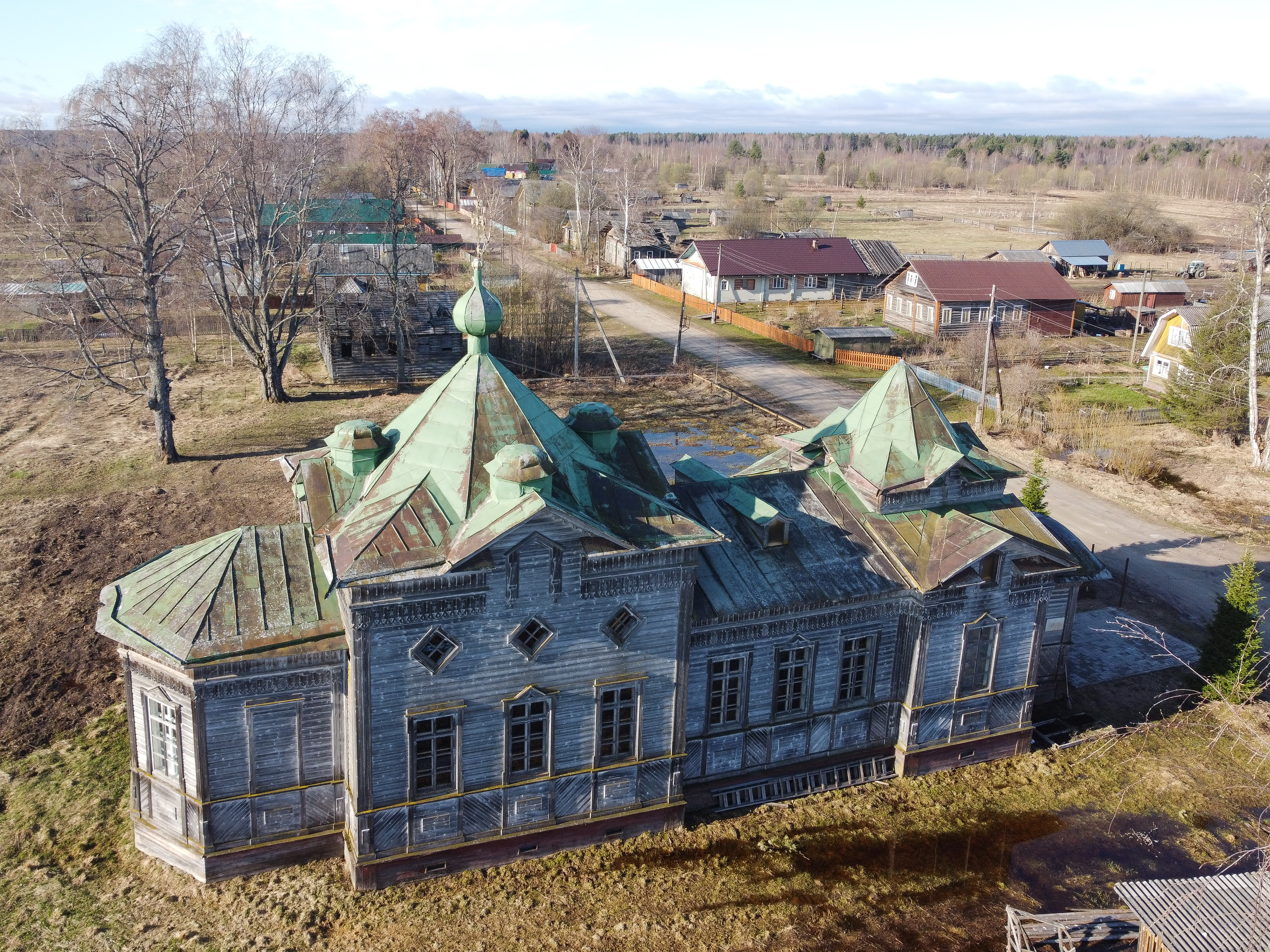

- Location within Arkhangelsk Oblast Location within Russia
- Coordinates: 61°28′N 42°24′E
- Country: Russia
- Region: Arkhangelsk Oblast
- District: Velsky District
- Time zone: UTC+3:00

Yukhnevo (Russian: Юхнево) is a rural locality (a village) in Puyskoye Rural Settlement of Velsky District, Arkhangelsk Oblast, Russia. The population was 67 as of 2014.

== Geography ==
Yukhnevo is located 55 km north of Velsk (the district's administrative centre) by road. Ignatovka is the nearest rural locality.
