= Katunino =

Katunino Катунино
- Settlement
- Location within Arkhangelsk Oblast Location within Russia
- Coordinates: 64°23′N 40°37′E
- Country: Russia
- Region: Arkhangelsk Oblast
- District: Primorsky District
- Time zone: UTC+3:00

Katunino (Russian: Катунино) is a rural locality (a settlement) and the administrative center of Katuninskoye Rural Settlement of Primorsky District, Arkhangelsk Oblast, Russia. The population was 3,443 as of 2010. There are 9 streets.

== Geography ==
Katunino is located on the Lakhtinskoye Lake, 22 km south of Arkhangelsk (the district's administrative centre) by road. Lakhta is the nearest rural locality.
