= Plyoso =

Plyoso Плёсо
- Village
- Location within Arkhangelsk Oblast Location within Russia
- Coordinates: 62°41′N 43°19′E
- Country: Russia
- Region: Arkhangelsk Oblast
- District: Vinogradovsky District
- Time zone: UTC+3:00

Plyoso (Russian: Плёсо) is a rural locality (a village) in Rochegodskoye Rural Settlement of Vinogradovsky District, Arkhangelsk Oblast, Russia. The population was 9 as of 2010.

== Geography ==
Plyoso is located 39 km southeast of Bereznik (the district's administrative centre) by road. Filippovskaya is the nearest rural locality.
