= Lyamtsa =

Lyamtsa Лямца
- Village
- Location within Arkhangelsk Oblast Location within Russia
- Coordinates: 64°26′N 37°04′E
- Country: Russia
- Region: Arkhangelsk Oblast
- District: Onezhsky District
- Time zone: UTC+3:00

Lyamtsa (Russian: Лямца) is a rural locality (a village) in Pokrovskoye Rural Settlement of Onezhsky District, Arkhangelsk Oblast, Russia. The population was 115 as of 2010. There are 5 streets.

== Geography ==
Lyamtsa is located 129 km northwest of Onega (the district's administrative centre) by road. Purnema is the nearest rural locality.
