= Lastola =

Lastola Ластола
- Village
- Location within Arkhangelsk Oblast Location within Russia
- Coordinates: 64°35′N 40°17′E
- Country: Russia
- Region: Arkhangelsk Oblast
- District: Primorsky District
- Time zone: UTC+3:00

Lastola (Russian: Ластола) is a rural locality (a village) and the administrative center of Lastolskoye Rural Settlement of Primorsky District, Arkhangelsk Oblast, Russia. The population was 443 as of 2010. There are 7 streets.

== Geography ==
Lastola is located 29 km northwest of Arkhangelsk (the district's administrative centre) by road. Onishovo is the nearest rural locality.
