= Isakovskaya =

Isakovskaya Исаковская
- Village
- Location within Arkhangelsk Oblast Location within Russia
- Coordinates: 62°06′N 45°13′E
- Country: Russia
- Region: Arkhangelsk Oblast
- District: Verkhnetoyemsky District
- Time zone: UTC+3:00

Isakovskaya (Russian: Исаковская) is a rural locality (a village) in Dvinskoye Rural Settlement of Verkhnetoyemsky District, Arkhangelsk Oblast, Russia. The population was 53 as of 2010.

== Geography ==
It is located on the Sodonga River.
