= Tsivozersky Pogost =

Tsivozersky Pogost Цивозерский Погост
- Village
- Location within Arkhangelsk Oblast Location within Russia
- Coordinates: 61°37′N 45°54′E
- Country: Russia
- Region: Arkhangelsk Oblast
- District: Krasnoborsky District
- Time zone: UTC+3:00

Tsivozersky Pogost (Russian: Цивозерский Погост) is a rural locality (a village) in Belosludskoye Rural Settlement of Krasnoborsky District, Arkhangelsk Oblast, Russia. The population was two as of 2010.

== Geography ==
Tsivozersky Pogost is located 26 km north of Krasnoborsk (the district's administrative centre) by road. Sidorovskaya is the nearest rural locality.
