= Blagoveshchenskoye, Arkhangelsk Oblast =

Blagoveshchenskoye Благовещенское
- Selo
- Location within Arkhangelsk Oblast Location within Russia
- Coordinates: 61°27′N 42°33′E
- Country: Russia
- Region: Arkhangelsk Oblast
- District: Velsky District
- Time zone: UTC+3:00

Blagoveshchenskoye (Russian: Благовещенское) is a rural locality (a selo) and the administrative center of Blagoveshchenskoye Rural Settlement of Velsky District, Arkhangelsk Oblast, Russia. The population was 1,086 as of 2014. There are 12 streets.

== Geography ==
Blagoveshchenskoye is located on the Ustya River, 62 km northeast of Velsk (the district's administrative centre) by road. Plovskaya is the nearest rural locality.
