= Shasta, Pinezhsky District, Arkhangelsk Oblast =

Shasta Шаста
- Village
- Location within Arkhangelsk Oblast Location within Russia
- Coordinates: 64°16′N 44°17′E
- Country: Russia
- Region: Arkhangelsk Oblast
- District: Pinezhsky District
- Time zone: UTC+3:00

Shasta (Russian: Шаста) is a rural locality (a village) in Pirinemskoye Rural Settlement of Pinezhsky District, Arkhangelsk Oblast, Russia. The population was 2 as of 2010.

== Geography ==
Shasta is located on the Pinega River, 48 km north of Karpogory (the district's administrative centre) by road. Veyegora is the nearest rural locality.
