= Luzhma =

Luzhma Лужма
- Settlement
- Location within Arkhangelsk Oblast Location within Russia
- Coordinates: 62°26′N 39°26′E
- Country: Russia
- Region: Arkhangelsk Oblast
- District: Plesetsky District
- Time zone: UTC+3:00

Luzhma (Russian: Лужма) is a rural locality (a settlement) in Fedovskoye Rural Settlement of Plesetsky District, Arkhangelsk Oblast, Russia. The population was 72 as of 2010. There are 6 streets.

== Geography ==
Luzhma is located 70 km southwest of Plesetsk (the district's administrative centre) by road. Lipakovo is the nearest rural locality.
