= Shardonem =

Shardonem Шардонемь
- Village
- Location within Arkhangelsk Oblast Location within Russia
- Coordinates: 63°54′N 44°35′E
- Country: Russia
- Region: Arkhangelsk Oblast
- District: Pinezhsky District
- Time zone: UTC+3:00

Shardonem (Russian: Шардонемь) is a rural locality (a village) in Karpogorskoye Rural Settlement of Pinezhsky District, Arkhangelsk Oblast, Russia. The population was 366 as of 2010. The locality has 3 streets.

== Geography ==
Shardonem is located 15 km from Karpogory on the Pinega River, 15 km southeast of Karpogory (the district's administrative centre) by road. Yerkino is the nearest rural locality.
