= Monastyrskaya Pashnya =

Monastyrskaya Pashnya Монастырская Пашня
- Village
- Location within Arkhangelsk Oblast Location within Russia
- Coordinates: 61°30′N 46°08′E
- Country: Russia
- Region: Arkhangelsk Oblast
- District: Krasnoborsky District
- Time zone: UTC+3:00

Monastyrskaya Pashnya (Russian: Монастырская Пашня) is a rural locality (a village) in Telegovskoye Rural Settlement, Krasnoborsky District, Arkhangelsk Oblast, Russia. The population was 213 as of 2010.

== Geography ==
Monastyrskaya Pashnya is located 13 km southeast of Krasnoborsk (the district's administrative centre) by road. Zapolye is the nearest rural locality.
