= Stegnevskaya =

Stegnevskaya Стегневская
- Village
- Location within Arkhangelsk Oblast Location within Russia
- Coordinates: 61°28′N 39°29′E
- Country: Russia
- Region: Arkhangelsk Oblast
- District: Kargopolsky District
- Time zone: UTC+3:00

Stegnevskaya (Russian: Стегневская) is a rural locality (a village) in Kargopolsky District, Arkhangelsk Oblast, Russia. The population was 21 as of 2012. There is 1 street.

== Geography ==
Stegnevskaya is located 35 km east of Kargopol (the district's administrative centre) by road. Lazarevskaya is the nearest rural locality.
