= Gorka Muravyovskaya =

Gorka Muravyovskaya Горка Муравьёвская
- Village
- Location within Arkhangelsk Oblast Location within Russia
- Coordinates: 61°06′N 42°08′E
- Country: Russia
- Region: Arkhangelsk Oblast
- District: Velsky District
- Time zone: UTC+3:00

Gorka Muravyovskaya (Russian: Горка Муравьёвская) is a rural locality (a village) in Muravyovskoye Rural Settlement of Velsky District, Arkhangelsk Oblast, Russia. The population was 1,553 as of 2014. There are 28 streets.

== Geography ==
Gorka Muravyovskaya is located on the Vaga River, 7 km northeast of Velsk (the district's administrative centre) by road. Petukhovskaya is the nearest rural locality.
