= Pogost, Velsky District, Arkhangelsk Oblast =

Pogost Погост
- Settlement
- Location within Arkhangelsk Oblast Location within Russia
- Coordinates: 61°16′N 42°22′E
- Country: Russia
- Region: Arkhangelsk Oblast
- District: Velsky District
- Time zone: UTC+3:00

Pogost (Russian: Погост) is a rural locality (a settlement) and the administrative center of Sudromskoye Rural Settlement of Velsky District, Arkhangelsk Oblast, Russia. The population was 465 as of 2014. There are 3 streets.

== Geography ==
Pogost is located on the Vaga River, 34 km northeast of Velsk (the district's administrative centre) by road. Paytovskaya is the nearest rural locality.
