= Makarovskaya, Nyandomsky District, Arkhangelsk Oblast =

Makarovskaya Макаровская
- Village
- Location within Arkhangelsk Oblast Location within Russia
- Coordinates: 61°47′N 40°51′E
- Country: Russia
- Region: Arkhangelsk Oblast
- District: Nyandomsky District
- Time zone: UTC+3:00

Makarovskaya (Russian: Макаровская) is a rural locality (a village) and the administrative center of Moshinskoye Rural Settlement of Nyandomsky District, Arkhangelsk Oblast, Russia. The population was 71 as of 2010. There are 3 streets.

== Geography ==
Makarovskaya is located 44 km northeast of Nyandoma (the district's administrative centre) by road. Petarikha is the nearest rural locality.
