= Rikasikha =

Rikasikha Рикасиха
- Village
- Location within Arkhangelsk Oblast Location within Russia
- Coordinates: 64°32′N 40°09′E
- Country: Russia
- Region: Arkhangelsk Oblast
- District: Primorsky District
- Time zone: UTC+3:00

Rikasikha (Russian: Рикасиха) is a rural locality (a village) and the administrative center of Primorskoye Rural Settlement of Primorsky District, Arkhangelsk Oblast, Russia. The population was 1,877 as of 2010. The locality contains 11 streets.

== Geography ==
Rikasikha is located 28 km west of Arkhangelsk (the district's administrative centre) by road. Lichka is the nearest rural locality.
