= Syrya =

Syrya Сырья
- Village
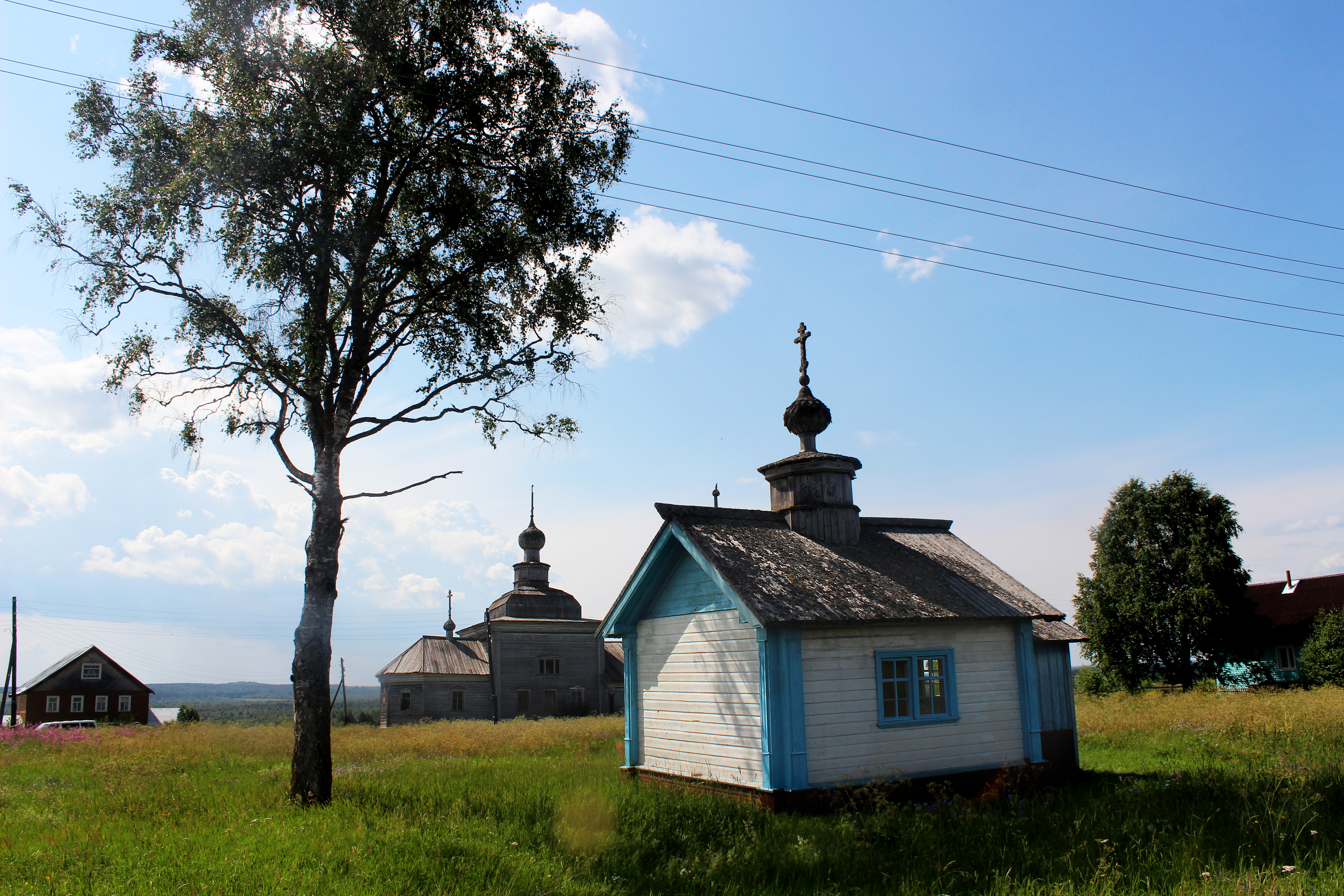
- St. Cyril's chapel

- Location within Arkhangelsk Oblast Location within Russia
- Coordinates: 63°38′N 39°06′E
- Country: Russia
- Region: Arkhangelsk Oblast
- District: Onezhsky District
- Time zone: UTC+3:00

Syrya (Russian: Сырья) is a rural locality (a village) in Chekuyevskoye Rural Settlement of Onezhsky District, Arkhangelsk Oblast, Russia. The population was 25 as of 2010.

== Geography ==
Syrya is located 77 km southeast of Onega (the district's administrative centre) by road. Bolshoy Bor is the nearest rural locality.
