= Olyushino =

Olyushino Олюшино
- Village
- Location within Arkhangelsk Oblast Location within Russia
- Coordinates: 61°05′N 46°38′E
- Country: Russia
- Region: Arkhangelsk Oblast
- District: Kotlassky District
- Time zone: UTC+3:00

Olyushino (Russian: Олюшино) is a rural locality (a village) in Cheryomushskoye Rural Settlement of Kotlassky District, Arkhangelsk Oblast, Russia. The population was 1 as of 2010.

== Geography ==
It is located on the Besedka River.
