= Konoksa =

Konoksa Конокса
- Village
- Location within Arkhangelsk Oblast Location within Russia
- Coordinates: 63°25′N 41°53′E
- Country: Russia
- Region: Arkhangelsk Oblast
- District: Kholmogorsky District

Population
  - Total: 7
- Time zone: UTC+3:00

Konoksa (Russian: Конокса) is a rural locality (a village) in Kholmogorsky District, Arkhangelsk Oblast, Russia. The population was 7 as of 2010.

== Geography ==
Konoksa is located on the Severnaya Dvina River, 122 km south of Kholmogory (the district's administrative centre) by road. Zakonoksa is the nearest rural locality.
