= Melogora =

Melogora Мелогора
- Village
- Location within Arkhangelsk Oblast Location within Russia
- Coordinates: 65°19′N 45°10′E
- Country: Russia
- Region: Arkhangelsk Oblast
- District: Mezensky District
- Time zone: UTC+3:00

Melogora (Russian: Мелогора) is a rural locality (a village) in Mezensky District, Arkhangelsk Oblast, Russia. The population was 53 as of 2012.

== Geography ==
Melogora is located on the Mezen River, 84 km south of Mezen (the district's administrative centre) by road. Tselegora is the nearest rural locality.
