= Karamino =

Karamino Карамино
- Village
- Location within Arkhangelsk Oblast Location within Russia
- Coordinates: 63°42′N 38°48′E
- Country: Russia
- Region: Arkhangelsk Oblast
- District: Onezhsky District
- Time zone: UTC+3:00

Karamino (Russian: Карамино) is a rural locality (a village) in Porozhskoye Rural Settlement of Onezhsky District, Arkhangelsk Oblast, Russia. The population was 1 as of 2010.

== Geography ==
Karamino is located between Bolshaya and Malaya Onega, 57 km southeast of Onega (the district's administrative centre) by road.
