= Kiltsa =

Rural locality in Mezensky District, Russia

Coordinates: 65°30′07″N 44°48′50″E

Kiltsa (Russian: Кильца) is a rural locality (a selo) in Mezensky District of Arkhangelsk Oblast, Russia.( 46 (2010 census); 89 (2002 census);

In 2016 Kiltsa was included in The Most Beautiful Villages in Russia.
