= Morzhegory =

Morzhegory Моржегоры
- Village
- Location within Arkhangelsk Oblast Location within Russia
- Coordinates: 63°03′N 42°08′E
- Country: Russia
- Region: Arkhangelsk Oblast
- District: Vinogradovsky District
- Time zone: UTC+3:00

Morzhegory (Russian: Моржегоры) is a rural locality (a village) in Morzhegorskoye Rural Settlement of Vinogradovsky District, Arkhangelsk Oblast, Russia. The population was 412 as of 2010. There are 3 streets.

== Geography ==
Morzhegory is located on the Severnaya Dvina River, 43 km northwest of Bereznik (the district's administrative centre) by road. Savinskaya is the nearest rural locality.
