= Pyanda (settlement) =

Pyanda Пянда
- Settlement
- Location within Arkhangelsk Oblast Location within Russia
- Coordinates: 62°57′54″N 42°36′09″E
- Country: Russia
- Region: Arkhangelsk Oblast
- District: Vinogradovsky District
- Time zone: UTC+3:00

Pyanda (Russian: Пянда) is a rural locality (a settlement) in Vinogradovsky District, Arkhangelsk Oblast, Russia. The population was 446 as of 2010. There are 9 streets in Pyanda.

== Geography ==
Pyanda is located on the Severnaya Dvina River, 17 km northwest of Bereznik (the district's administrative centre) by road. Ustye is the nearest rural locality.
