= Priluk =

Priluk Прилук
- Village
- Location within Arkhangelsk Oblast Location within Russia
- Coordinates: 62°49′N 42°59′E
- Country: Russia
- Region: Arkhangelsk Oblast
- District: Vinogradovsky District

Population (2010)
  - Total: 17
- Time zone: UTC+3:00

Priluk (Russian: Прилук) is a rural locality (a village) in Vinogradovsky District, Arkhangelsk Oblast, Russia. The population was 17 as of 2010.

In the 1940s prisoners of the Sevdvinlag camps who died in the infirmary 3 km away were buried here.

== Geography ==
Priluk is located 16 km east of Bereznik (the district's administrative centre) by road. Shilenga is the nearest rural locality.
