= Naumovskaya =

Naumovskaya Наумовская
- Village
- Location within Arkhangelsk Oblast Location within Russia
- Coordinates: 63°49′N 38°16′E
- Country: Russia
- Region: Arkhangelsk Oblast
- District: Onezhsky District
- Time zone: UTC+3:00

Naumovskaya (Russian: Наумовская) is a rural locality (a village) in Porozhskoye Rural Settlement of Onezhsky District, Arkhangelsk Oblast, Russia. The population was 10 as of 2010.

== Geography ==
Naumovskaya is located on the Onega River, 14 km southeast of Onega (the district's administrative centre) by road. Medvedevskaya is the nearest rural locality.
