= Krominskaya =

Krominskaya Кроминская
- Village
- Location within Arkhangelsk Oblast Location within Russia
- Coordinates: 61°45′N 38°43′E
- Country: Russia
- Region: Arkhangelsk Oblast
- District: Kargopolsky District
- Time zone: UTC+3:00

Krominskaya (Russian: Кроминская) is a rural locality (a village) in Oshevenskoye Rural Settlement of Kargopolsky District, Arkhangelsk Oblast, Russia. The population was 8 as of 2010.

== Geography ==
Krominskaya is located 35 km north of Kargopol (the district's administrative centre) by road. Pogost Navolochny is the nearest rural locality.
