= Voronovskaya =

Voronovskaya Вороновская
- Village
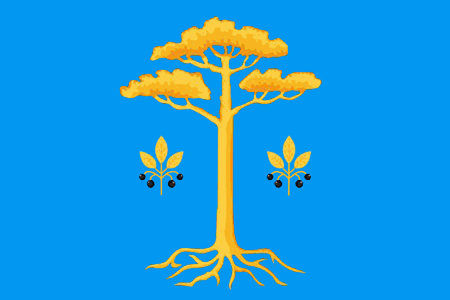
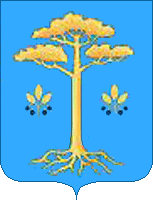
- Flag Seal

- Location within Arkhangelsk Oblast Location within Russia
- Coordinates: 61°05′N 42°06′E
- Country: Russia
- Region: Arkhangelsk Oblast
- District: Velsky District
- Time zone: UTC+3:00

Voronovskaya (Russian: Вороновская) is a rural locality (a village) in Muravyovskoye Rural Settlement of Velsky District, Arkhangelsk Oblast, Russia. The population was 464 as of 2014. In total, there are 8 streets.

== Geography ==
Voronovskaya is located on the Vaga River, 4 km north of Velsk (the district's administrative centre) by road. Lukinskaya is the nearest rural locality.
