= Panitsa =

Panitsa Паница
- Village
- Location within Arkhangelsk Oblast Location within Russia
- Coordinates: 62°57′N 42°38′E
- Country: Russia
- Region: Arkhangelsk Oblast
- District: Vinogradovsky District

Panitsa (Russian: Паница) is a rural locality (a village) in Ust-Vayengskoye Rural Settlement of Vinogradovsky District, Arkhangelsk Oblast, Russia. The population was 1 as of 2010.

== Geography ==
Panitsa is located 17 kilometres (11 mi) north of Bereznik (the district's administrative centre) by road. Vysokusha is the nearest rural locality.
