= Konetsdvorye =

Konetsdvorye Конецдворье
- Village
- Location within Arkhangelsk Oblast Location within Russia
- Coordinates: 64°34′N 40°13′E
- Country: Russia
- Region: Arkhangelsk Oblast
- District: Primorsky District
- Time zone: UTC+3:00

Konetsdvorye (Russian: Конецдворье) is a rural locality (a village) in Ostrovnoye Rural Settlement of Primorsky District, Arkhangelsk Oblast, Russia. The population was 54 as of 2010.

== Geography ==
Konetsdvorye is located on the Koneshny island, 34 km west of Arkhangelsk (the district's administrative centre) by road. Priluk is the nearest rural locality.
