= Akichkin Pochinok =

Akichkin Pochinok Акичкин Починок
- Village
- Location within Arkhangelsk Oblast Location within Russia
- Coordinates: 61°41′N 43°50′E
- Country: Russia
- Region: Arkhangelsk Oblast
- District: Ustyansky District
- Time zone: UTC+3:00

Akichkin Pochinok (Russian: Акичкин Починок) is a rural locality (a village) in Bestuzhevskoye Rural Settlement of Ustyansky District, Arkhangelsk Oblast, Russia. The population was 47 as of 2010.

== Geography ==
Akichkin Pochinok is located on the Veryuga River, 100 km northeast of Oktyabrsky (the district's administrative centre) by road. Andreyev Pochinok is the nearest rural locality.
