= Pustynga =

Pustynga Пустыньга
- Village
- Location within Arkhangelsk Oblast Location within Russia
- Coordinates: 61°09′N 42°16′E
- Country: Russia
- Region: Arkhangelsk Oblast
- District: Velsky District
- Time zone: UTC+3:00

Pustynga (Russian: Пустыньга) is a rural locality (a village) in the Muravyovskoye Rural Settlement of Velsky District, Arkhangelsk Oblast, Russia. The population was 54 as of 2014.

== Geography ==
Pustynga is located 19 km northeast of Velsk (the district's administrative centre) by road. Vazhskaya Zapan is the nearest rural locality.
