= Fedotovo =

Fedotovo (Russian: Федотово) is the name of several rural localities in Russia.

== Ivanovo Oblast ==
As of 2010, two rural localities in Ivanovo Oblast bear this name:

- Fedotovo, Puchezhsky District, Ivanovo Oblast, a village in Puchezhsky District
- Fedotovo, Shuysky District, Ivanovo Oblast, a village in Shuysky District

== Kaliningrad Oblast ==
As of 2010, one rural locality in Kaliningrad Oblast bears this name:

- Fedotovo, Kaliningrad Oblast, a settlement under the administrative jurisdiction of the town of district significance of Pravdinsk in Pravdinsky District

== Kaluga Oblast ==
As of 2010, one rural locality in Kaluga Oblast bears this name:

- Fedotovo, Kaluga Oblast, a selo in Borovsky District

== Republic of Karelia ==
As of 2010, one rural locality in the Republic of Karelia bears this name:

- Fedotovo, Republic of Karelia, a village in Medvezhyegorsky District

== Kostroma Oblast ==
As of 2010, five rural localities in Kostroma Oblast bear this name:

- Fedotovo, Tsentralnoye Settlement, Buysky District, Kostroma Oblast, two villages in Tsentralnoye Settlement of Buysky District
- Fedotovo, Chukhlomsky District, Kostroma Oblast, a village in Nozhkinskoye Settlement of Chukhlomsky District
- Fedotovo, Makaryevsky District, Kostroma Oblast, a village in Voznesenskoye Settlement of Makaryevsky District
- Fedotovo, Susaninsky District, Kostroma Oblast, a village in Buyakovskoye Settlement of Susaninsky District

== Moscow Oblast ==
As of 2010, four rural localities in Moscow Oblast bear this name:

- Fedotovo, Dmitrovsky District, Moscow Oblast, a village in Gabovskoye Rural Settlement of Dmitrovsky District
- Fedotovo, Orekhovo-Zuyevsky District, Moscow Oblast, a village in Belavinskoye Rural Settlement of Orekhovo-Zuyevsky District
- Fedotovo, Ruzsky District, Moscow Oblast, a village in Dorokhovskoye Rural Settlement of Ruzsky District
- Fedotovo, Taldomsky District, Moscow Oblast, a village in Guslevskoye Rural Settlement of Taldomsky District

== Nizhny Novgorod Oblast ==
As of 2010, one rural locality in Nizhny Novgorod Oblast bears this name:

- Fedotovo, Nizhny Novgorod Oblast, a village in Semenovsky Selsoviet of Urensky District

== Oryol Oblast ==
As of 2010, one rural locality in Oryol Oblast bears this name:

- Fedotovo, Oryol Oblast, a village in Apalkovsky Selsoviet of Kromskoy District

== Perm Krai ==
As of 2010, three rural localities in Perm Krai bear this name:

- Fedotovo, Beryozovsky District, Perm Krai, a village in Beryozovsky District
- Fedotovo, Permsky District, Perm Krai, a village in Permsky District
- Fedotovo, Yusvinsky District, Perm Krai, a village in Yusvinsky District

== Pskov Oblast ==
As of 2010, two rural localities in Pskov Oblast bear this name:

- Fedotovo, Novorzhevsky District, Pskov Oblast, a village in Novorzhevsky District
- Fedotovo, Porkhovsky District, Pskov Oblast, a village in Porkhovsky District

== Republic of Tatarstan ==
As of 2010, one rural locality in the Republic of Tatarstan bears this name:

- Fedotovo, Republic of Tatarstan, a selo in Zainsky District

== Tver Oblast ==
As of 2010, three rural localities in Tver Oblast bear this name:

- Fedotovo, Rzhevsky District, Tver Oblast, a village in Rzhevsky District
- Fedotovo, Toropetsky District, Tver Oblast, a village in Toropetsky District
- Fedotovo, Vesyegonsky District, Tver Oblast, a village in Vesyegonsky District

== Vladimir Oblast ==
As of 2010, two rural localities in Vladimir Oblast bear this name:

- Fedotovo, Gus-Khrustalny District, Vladimir Oblast, a village in Gus-Khrustalny District
- Fedotovo, Sobinsky District, Vladimir Oblast, a village in Sobinsky District

== Vologda Oblast ==
As of 2010, six rural localities in Vologda Oblast bear this name:

- Fedotovo, Belozersky District, Vologda Oblast, a village in Antushevsky Selsoviet of Belozersky District
- Fedotovo, Kirillovsky District, Vologda Oblast, a village in Ferapontovsky Selsoviet of Kirillovsky District
- Fedotovo, Sheksninsky District, Vologda Oblast, a village in Charomsky Selsoviet of Sheksninsky District
- Fedotovo, Totemsky District, Vologda Oblast, a village in Matveyevsky Selsoviet of Totemsky District
- Fedotovo, Borisovsky Selsoviet, Vologodsky District, Vologda Oblast, a village in Borisovsky Selsoviet of Vologodsky District
- Fedotovo, Fedotovsky Selsoviet, Vologodsky District, Vologda Oblast, a settlement in Fedotovsky Selsoviet of Vologodsky District

== Yaroslavl Oblast ==
As of 2010, three rural localities in Yaroslavl Oblast bear this name:

- Fedotovo, Bolsheselsky District, Yaroslavl Oblast, a village in Markovsky Rural Okrug of Bolsheselsky District
- Fedotovo, Lyubimsky District, Yaroslavl Oblast, a village in Kirillovsky Rural Okrug of Lyubimsky District
- Fedotovo, Uglichsky District, Yaroslavl Oblast, a village in Pokrovsky Rural Okrug of Uglichsky District
