= Shidrovo =

Shidrovo (Russian: Шидрово) is the name of several rural localities in Shidrovsky Selsoviet of Vinogradovsky District of Arkhangelsk Oblast, Russia:

- Shidrovo (settlement), a settlement
- Shidrovo (village), a village
