= Arthur Sullivan (Australian soldier) =

Australian banker, soldier, and recipient of the Victoria Cross

Arthur Sullivan VC
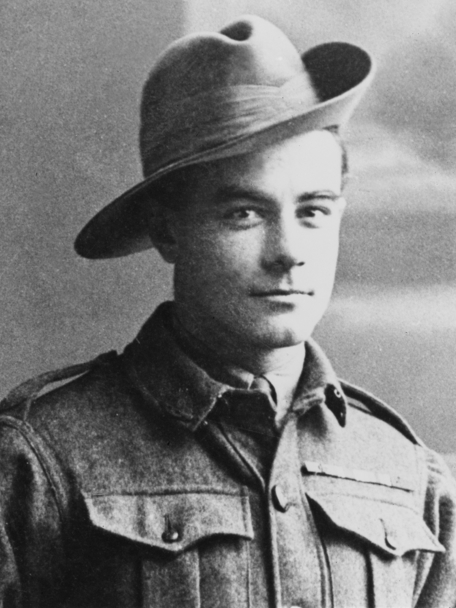
- Sullivan c. 1919
- Born: 27 November 1896; Prospect, South Australia
- Died: 9 April 1937 (aged 40); Westminster, United Kingdom
- Spouse: Dorothy Frances Veale (m. 1928)
- Children: 3
- Military career
- Allegiance: Australia; United Kingdom
- Branch: Australian Imperial Force (1918–1919); British Army (1919)
- Service years: 1918–1919
- Rank: Corporal
- Units: Royal Australian Artillery; 45th Battalion, Royal Fusiliers
- Conflicts: World War I; Russian Civil War
- Awards: Victoria Cross

Arthur Percy Sullivan VC (27 November 1896 – 9 April 1937) was an Australian recipient of the Victoria Cross (VC), the highest award for gallantry in the face of the enemy that can be awarded to a member of the British Armed Forces. Born in South Australia, Sullivan worked for the National Bank of Australasia prior to enlisting in the Australian Imperial Force (AIF) in April 1918 for service in World War I. He had arrived in the United Kingdom, but had not completed training when the Armistice came into effect on 11 November. Sullivan was promoted to corporal in March 1919, but wanting to see active service he sought and received his discharge from the AIF on 28 May. On the same day, he enlisted in the British Army for service with the North Russia Relief Force, part of the Allied intervention in the Russian Civil War.

Sullivan was deployed to northern Russia with the relief force. Following a successful attack, he was a member of the rearguard of a column withdrawing across the Sheika River. As his platoon crossed the river on a crude one-plank bridge in the early hours of 11 August 1919, it came under intense fire from Bolshevik troops, and four members fell into the river. Sullivan immediately jumped in and rescued them all, one by one, and was awarded the VC for his actions. Demobilised from the British Army after completing his service, Sullivan returned to Australia and resumed his civilian career as a banker. He was in London for the coronation of King George VI as part of the Australian Coronation Contingent in 1937, when he died of head injuries received in a fall. His medal set is displayed in the Hall of Valour at the Australian War Memorial in Canberra.

== Early life ==
Arthur Percy Sullivan was born on 27 November 1896 at Prospect, South Australia, (Note: Staunton, Quinlivian and the Australian War Memorial give his place of birth as Prospect, but this is contradicted by Wigmore & Harding and South Australian Births, Deaths and Marriages data, which state he was born in Crystal Brook. Blanch and Pegram are silent on the issue.) the only child of Arthur Monks Sullivan, a storekeeper, and his wife Eliza née Dobbs of Crystal Brook in the mid-north of the state. Beginning on 9 February 1904, he was educated at Crystal Brook Public School and from 1910 at Gladstone High School where he was the school captain. Sullivan was also editor of the school magazine and the best Australian rules football player for his school.

After completing his education in mid-1913, he gained employment at a branch of the National Bank of Australasia in Gladstone on 25 September. After six months' probation, he was taken on as a clerk on 8 April 1914. Only 17 at the outbreak of World War I, Sullivan wanted to enlist, but his parents would not give the necessary permission. On 25 May 1915, he was promoted and transferred to a branch at Broken Hill, New South Wales, just over the northeastern border of South Australia, where he was promoted to ledger keeper. The following year he returned to his home state to work at a branch in Maitland commencing on 30 October, where he was promoted to teller. Sullivan played golf and Australian rules football, and was the secretary of the Maitland Patriotic Society, which organised farewells and welcome home events for local men who had enlisted or returned from the war. He turned 20 soon after his arrival in Maitland, and his parents permitted him to enlist, although he did not do so immediately.

== Military service ==
=== World War I ===
On 27 April 1918, Sullivan attended a fund-raising parade in Port Pirie for the Returned Soldiers' Appeal. After the parade, the attendees congregated at the town recreation grounds, where a sports carnival was held, and volunteers for the Australian Imperial Force (AIF) were encouraged to come forward. Sullivan enlisted that day as a private in the AIF and was allocated as a general reinforcement. He underwent training at Mitcham Camp in Adelaide between 14 May and 4 June, and was then farewelled in Maitland at an event similar to those he had organised for other recruits before their departure. He embarked with about 700 others on the troopship HMAT A74 Marathon in Melbourne on 23 July bound for the United Kingdom. The convoy in which the Marathon travelled sailed via Albany, Western Australia, Durban and Cape Town, South Africa, and Freetown, Sierra Leone. Upon arriving in Tilbury in the UK on 27 September, Sullivan was briefly allocated as a reinforcement to the 10th Battalion before transferring to the Royal Regiment of Australian Artillery training camp at Heytesbury, Wiltshire, on 5 October 1918. He was still in training when the Armistice was declared on 11 November 1918, and Sullivan therefore saw no action in World War I.

=== Russia ===
While posted to the camp at Heytesbury, Sullivan contracted gonorrhea and was hospitalised at Bulford Camp between 25 November 1918 and 11 March 1919. Upon discharge from hospital he was transferred to a training battalion at Codford, and on 23 March he was promoted to acting corporal, and employed as a camp orderly room corporal. He was keen for a tour of active duty with the North Russia Relief Force (NRRF) as part of the Allied intervention in the Russian Civil War. This intervention had begun after the Bolsheviks had overthrown the Russian government and made peace with the Central Powers in 1917. Allied troops had become involved in the ongoing civil war, and after the Armistice in November 1918, their involvement continued, albeit with poorly defined objectives. In March 1919, the NRRF was conceived to intervene against the Bolsheviks and create a situation where the original force could be withdrawn. Although no Australian contingent was being sent with the NRRF, it was recruiting amongst Australians then in the UK, and a recruiting officer visited Codford in April. Sullivan was attracted by the high pay and potential for adventure. The Australian government limited recruitment to single Australians who were willing to forgo their right to repatriation. Sullivan was discharged from the AIF on 28 May 1919, and enlisted in the British Army on the same day as a corporal. (Note: Staunton, Wigmore & Harding, and the Australian War Memorial give his AIF discharge date as 12 June, but this is contradicted by his discharge certificate which says 28 May.)

The NRRF was an 8,000-strong force of two brigades that included about 150 Australians who had been awaiting repatriation from the UK. Sullivan was allotted to the 45th Battalion, the Royal Fusiliers (45th RF), part of the NRRF brigade commanded by Brigadier General Lionel Sadleir-Jackson. The Australians were permitted to continue wearing the Australian uniform, and wore the NRRF colour patch on their sleeve. The commanding officer of the 45th RF was Lieutenant Colonel Charles Davies, an Australian who had commanded the 32nd Battalion on the Western Front. Sullivan and the other Australians went into camp at Sandling in Kent where they prepared for their deployment. The Australians who volunteered for the NRRF were concentrated in two units: the 45th RF, and the 201st Company, Machine Gun Corps.

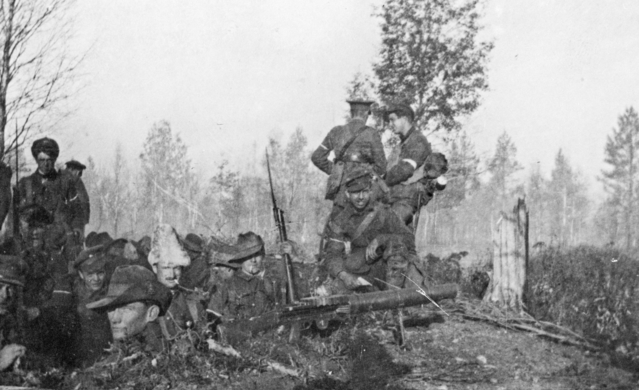
Members of the 45th Battalion, the Royal Fusiliers in North Russia in 1919, including Australians wearing slouch hats

Sullivan sailed directly from Leith to Russia with an advance party on board the cargo ship Steigerwald on 9 June, and, travelling via Murmansk, landed at Arkhangelsk on 20 June. A 50-man detachment of the advance party was almost immediately sent up the Dvina River by paddle steamer to the village of Pinega, where they stayed for five days, ostensibly to quell rioting, although they actually encountered no trouble. They returned downstream to the village of Osinovo where they were reunited with the rest of the advance party. Osinovo was about 19 miles (30 km) behind the frontline at the village of Seltso, and the camp contained about 4,000 troops. At Osinovo, they went into camp with the rest of the advance force, and underwent intensive training. On the river was a flotilla of British monitors and gunboats. The main body of the NRRF arrived in Arkhangelsk on 11 July, following two mutinies by British-led White Russian battalions in the area. The Bolsheviks held a fortified line about 25 miles (40 km) south of Osinovo.

=== Dvina offensive ===
In August the NRRF was ordered to advance 150 miles (240 km) down the Dvina River to attack the Bolsheviks. About 4,000 men of the NRRF, supported by the river flotilla, artillery and aircraft, were set against about 6,000 Bolshevik troops of the 3rd Brigade of the 18th Division, also supported by artillery. D Company of the 45th RF, which included Sullivan and about 20 other Australians, was to push down the western side of the Dvina and take the villages of Sludka and Lipovets from the rear. Other columns were to attack other villages on the river. The D Company column included machine gun sections, mortars, mountain guns and some cavalry. They were ferried across the river to the village of Yakovlevskoye and set off on the afternoon of 7 August. They then undertook a wide-sweeping approach march of nearly 31 miles (50 km) through a thick forest to be in position for the attack at 12:00 on 10 August. The aims of the overall offensive were three-fold: to lower Bolshevik morale; to push back the Bolshevik river flotilla so that mines could be laid to impede any follow-up of the imminent British withdrawal; and to improve the morale of the anti-Bolshevik forces.

Sludka was the column's first objective, but on 9 August, scouts reported that the location of a swamp made a direct attack on the village impossible. As a result, the column pushed further south to attack the village of Kochamika, after which they would turn north and capture Sludka. The approach march began at 06:00 on 10 August, and the men slogged through the mud to positions at the edge of the forest by 11:00. Thirty minutes later, the British artillery, the river flotilla and aircraft began bombarding Kochamika. At 12:00, the D Company column, which included Sullivan's 16 Platoon, launched its assault, although without the support of the mountain guns and cavalry that had been left behind owing to the difficult terrain. With bayonets fixed, the force easily put the stunned Bolshevik defenders to flight. As soon as the village was taken, they came under fire from the Bolshevik river flotilla.

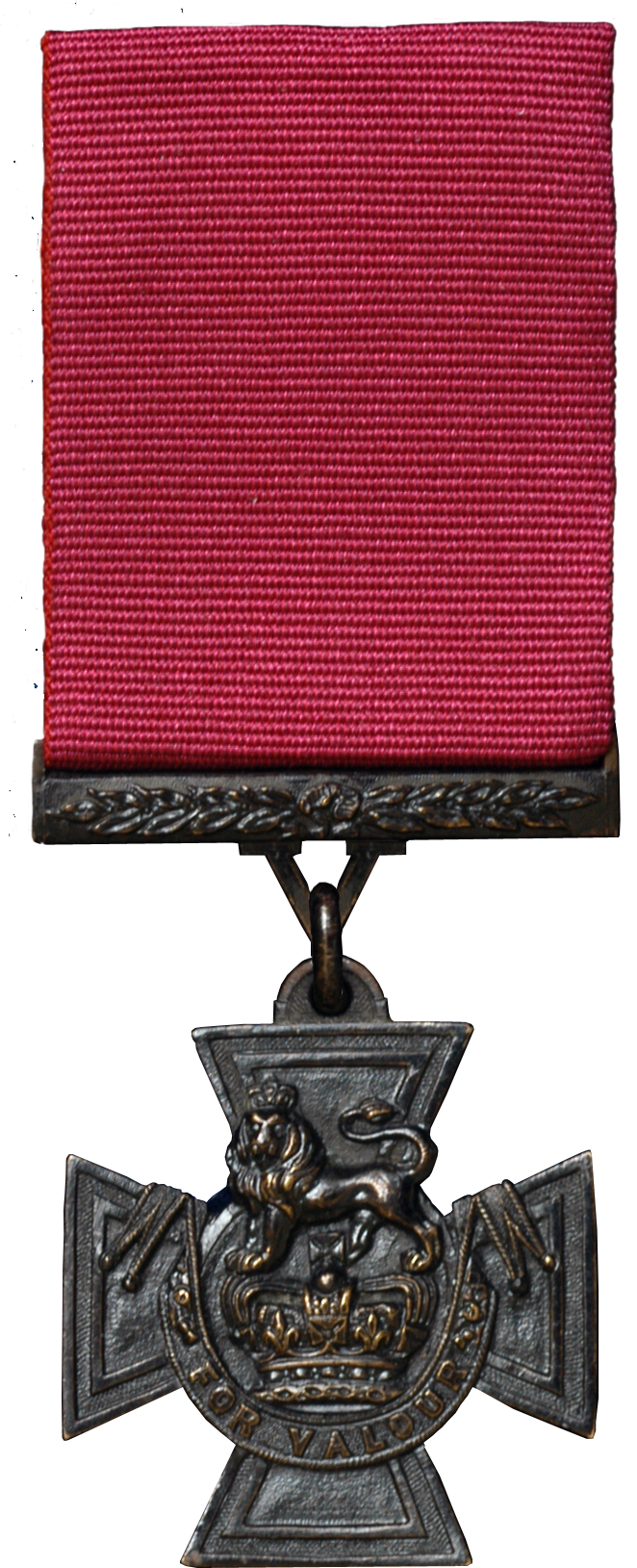
The Victoria Cross

D Company then pushed northwards, capturing several hamlets and many Bolshevik prisoners, although D Company's commander was killed by river gunboat fire. After scouting out Sludka, a successful assault was mounted on that village as well, while another column led by A Company captured Lipovets. The D Company column then joined A Company at Lipovets aiming to then reunite with the rest of the force, which had been unsuccessfully attacking the village of Seltso from the north. The Bolsheviks landed around 100 sailors between the two Allied columns, cutting off the southerly column including A and D Companies. Without their commander and running low on ammunition, the remaining officers decided to try to break out rather than push on towards Seltso. Impeded by their own wounded, over 500 prisoners-of-war, and local townspeople forced to accompany the column to stop them informing the Bolsheviks, the column made slow progress. Sullivan's 16 Platoon was designated as the rearguard.

About 02:30 on 11 August, having covered 12 miles (20 km) in eight hours, the column crossed the Sheika River, which at this point resembled a deep swamp about 330 feet (100 m) wide. The crossing was over a crude single-plank bridge. Sullivan's platoon was holding the near bank. As the long column crossed in single file, it was hit by Bolshevik rifle and machine gun fire at a range of less than 330 feet (100 m). The fire from the ambush increased as the rearguard crossed, and four men fell into the swamp and were in danger of drowning owing to exhaustion. Despite the intense Bolshevik gunfire and already nearly across the river himself, Sullivan immediately set about rescuing them. The first man that Sullivan saved from the swamp was Lieutenant Charles Henry Gordon-Lennox, Lord Settrington, who had been wounded prior to falling off the bridge. He was the eldest son of the 8th Duke of Richmond and heir to the dukedoms of Richmond, Lennox and Gordon. He died of his wounds two weeks later in hospital at Bereznik. The second and third soldiers rescued were similarly pulled out of the swamp by Sullivan after either being hit or avoiding enemy fire. The fourth man was some distance away and Sullivan waded out with a piece of broken handrail from the temporary bridge that the soldier was able to grab and be pulled to safety. All four would have drowned without Sullivan's action. The fusiliers returned fire from the far bank, and suppressed the Bolshevik fire. After the river crossing, some members of the column broke off into smaller groups, but all remaining members made their way back to the British lines at Troitsa about 07:00. Total British casualties during the overall attack were less than 30 killed with over 100 wounded.

For his actions on 11 August, Sullivan was recommended for the Victoria Cross (VC), the highest award for gallantry in the face of the enemy that can be awarded to a member of the British armed forces. Two other Australians were awarded the Distinguished Conduct Medal (DCM), second only to the VC, for their actions at the river crossing.

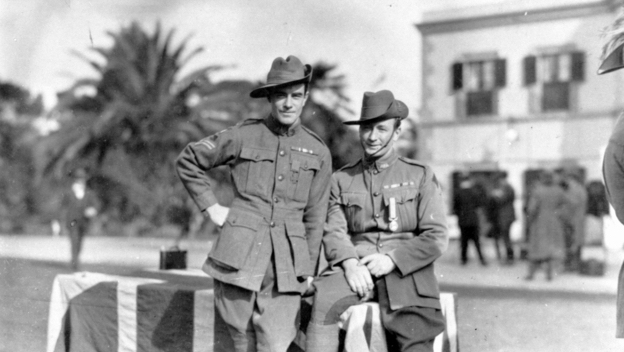
Arthur Sullivan VC (left) and another soldier after their investitures on 13 July 1920 at Government House, Adelaide

British forces successfully evacuated from North Russia by late September, leaving Troitsa by 10 September, and sailing from Arkhangelsk on 27 September, with Sullivan having spent 100 days in Russia. On 26 September, Sullivan's VC was formally announced in The London Gazette. The citation read: (Note: The citation states that his actions took place on 10 August, but this is an error.)

For most conspicuous bravery and devotion to duty on the 10th August, 1919 at the Sheika River, North Russia. The platoon to which he belonged, after fighting a rearguard covering action, had to cross the river by means of a narrow plank, and during the passage an officer and three men fell into a deep swamp. Without hesitation, under intense fire, Corporal Sullivan jumped into the river and rescued all four, bringing them out singly. But for this gallant action his comrades would undoubtedly have been drowned. It was a splendid example of heroism, as all ranks were on the point of exhaustion and the enemy less than 100 yards distant.

— The London Gazette 26 September 1919

When told of his award, Sullivan said that his comrades were also worthy of recognition and stated that his VC should be raffled, although the latter did not occur.

=== Return to Australia ===
The Australians arrived in Plymouth on 9 October, and were then sent to a repatriation camp near Winchester. After a rowdy night out on leave following their arrival, a British sergeant tried to get the names of all the miscreants in his notebook. When questioned about his name, Sullivan replied, "Corporal Sullivan VC to you, you pommie bastard". Despite the insubordination, no action was taken against him. Sullivan gave only one interview about his VC exploits, and was modest and unassuming, saying that it was "not much to talk about", and that he had been lucky. He remained reluctant to talk about his VC actions, and became known as the "Shy VC".

The NRRF was demobilised upon its return to the UK. Sullivan wished to return to Australia immediately without waiting for his investiture by King George V. He left England on 1 November aboard the troopship Nestor, and travelling the reverse of the route he had followed in 1918, Sullivan returned to Adelaide, the South Australian capital, on 12 December where he was greeted as a hero and afforded a reception at the Adelaide Town Hall. During the voyage he became friends with a Tasmanian VC recipient, Walter Brown. On his return to Maitland, the Maitland Patriotic Society held one last welcome home event, on 6 January 1920, at which Sullivan was the guest of honour.

On hearing of his VC, the National Bank decided to give Sullivan a gratuity of A£100, which was enough to pay for a small house in Adelaide. He was presented with his VC at Government House, Adelaide, on 13 July 1920 by Edward, the Prince of Wales, during his royal tour of Australia. The prince smiled at Sullivan and quipped "Aren't you the man who ran away from father?" Soon after his investiture, he became seriously ill with malaria, which he had contracted while in Russia, but he soon recovered. For his service in World War I and the Russian Civil War, in addition to the VC, he was also awarded the British War Medal and Victory Medal.

== Later life ==
Arthur Sullivan was a very popular man, and his reputation as the "Shy VC" was enhanced by his "unassuming character and reluctance to talk of his exploits". Upon his return to Australia, he resumed his former employment with the National Bank of Australasia, initially at Maitland from 9 February 1920, and re-immersed himself in the local community and sports. In July 1921, he was promoted and had to be transferred to take up his new appointment as part of the bank's relieving staff. He fulfilled this role until 7 May 1925, when he took up the position of accountant at the Orroroo branch which he held until November 1927. While there, he met Dorothy Frances Veale, a nurse at the local hospital, and they began a courtship. During this time he donated a machete he had carried in North Russia to the Australian War Memorial. In 1927 he travelled to Melbourne to participate in a dinner and in the Anzac Day Commemorative March alongside 28 other VC recipients. Later that year he was transferred back to the South Australian relieving staff for four months, followed by a move to New South Wales, still as part of the relieving staff pool. After writing to each other daily during their separation, Sullivan married Dorothy, whose family were from the state of Victoria, at an Anglican church in Fairfield, Victoria, on 5 December 1928.

In 1929 he transferred to the bank's head office in Sydney where he and Dorothy lived at Manly for five years. They had three children, Moya born in 1931, and twins Brian and Shirley in 1933. In July 1934, Sullivan was made the manager of the bank's branch in Casino, New South Wales. He was closely involved with the community, was president of the local Returned Sailors and Soldiers Imperial League of Australia sub-branch, and was widely admired and respected in the town.

=== Australian Coronation Contingent ===
In 1937, Sullivan was selected to join the Australian contingent to attend the coronation of King George VI and Queen Elizabeth, although Sullivan had another reason to want to travel to the UK. His friend, British Sergeant Arthur Evans, VC, DCM, formerly of the Lincolnshire Regiment, had died in Australia, and Sullivan had promised to escort Evans' ashes to his family in the UK. The Australian Coronation Contingent (ACC) comprised 100 soldiers, 25 sailors and 25 airmen. Half the soldiers were serving troops and half were returned members of the AIF. Sullivan was the only VC recipient in the group. As a condition of joining the ACC, Sullivan was re-enlisted as a gunner in the Royal Regiment of Australian Artillery on 31 January. The ACC went into camp in Melbourne on 1 February, where they were subjected to drill, physical exercise, route marches and picquet duty for two weeks. On 16 February, the ACC embarked at Melbourne on the ocean liner SS Oronsay, and Sullivan was upgraded to a first-class berth. Sullivan did not take to being under military discipline again, and he was charged with two disciplinary offences whilst aboard.

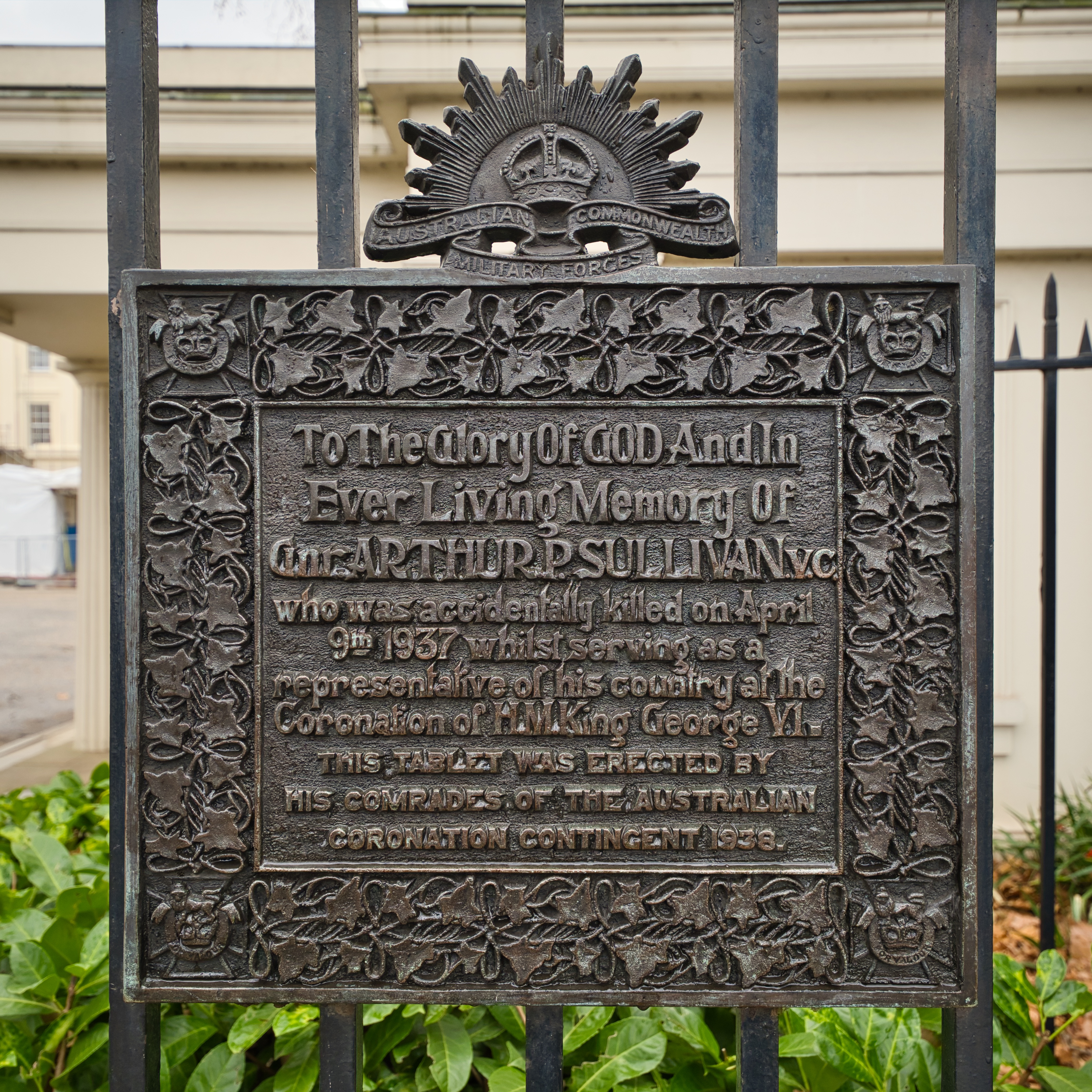
The memorial plaque in memory of Arthur Percy Sullivan, on the railings of Wellington Barracks, London

Oronsay sailed via Adelaide, Perth, Colombo, Aden, Suez, Naples, Monte Carlo and Toulon, including several opportunities for shore leave. The ship docked in London on 25 March. Sullivan handed his friend's ashes to representatives of the British Legion at Lytham St Annes in Lancashire on 27 March, and they were passed on to Evans' sister. Despite an intense schedule of parade ground drill, the main purpose of the visit was ambassadorial and ceremonial, so leave was granted most afternoons and evenings and there were many offers of hospitality.

On 9 April 1937, a little over a month before King George VI's coronation, Sullivan attended an afternoon tea in St James's along with about fifty members of the ACC. He left the tea party early in order to get ready for a reunion dinner that evening at the Royal Fusiliers regimental headquarters located in the Tower of London. About 19:40, as it was getting dark, he was returning to his accommodation at Wellington Barracks on Birdcage Walk, Westminster, when he was mobbed by autograph hunters. While attempting to avoid them, he slipped and struck his head against the kerb, fracturing his skull; a cyclist also struck him. He was taken to hospital, but died soon after, aged 40.

In the wake of Sullivan's death, the ACC cancelled all their scheduled activities for three days, including an honour guard they were to mount for the arrival in London of the ACC commander, General Sir Harry Chauvel and his wife. Chauvel was also a friend of Sullivan's and, as a director of the National Bank of Australasia, knew Sullivan on a professional level. Sullivan's death deeply affected the members of the ACC as well as both governments, with King George VI and Queen Elizabeth sending a message to the Australian high commissioner and former prime minister of Australia, Stanley Bruce, to express their sadness. Because of legislative requirements, Sullivan's inquest was conducted with his coffin in the court. The coroner found that his death was accidental, and was caused by a fracture to the base of the skull and lacerations to the brain. One of the autograph hunters provided compelling evidence that Sullivan had fallen before the cyclist collided with him.

=== Legacy ===
After lying in state with an ACC catafalque party for ninety minutes, Sullivan was afforded a full military funeral at the Guards Chapel, Wellington Barracks, on 13 April, which was attended by many notables, including between nine and twelve VC recipients, including one Australian, Frank McNamara. The funeral was said to have been the largest military funeral given to a soldier of his rank. Afterwards, his body was cremated at Golders Green after a short service by the former Australian World War I chaplain George Green. The ACC lined the route to Golders Green, along with thousands of onlookers. On 12 May, to acknowledge Sullivan's death, a gap was deliberately left in the ranks of the ACC as they marched in the coronation parade. His ashes were returned to Sydney with the ACC where they were met by Dorothy. A pallbearer party including nine VC recipients was one element of a long procession from Man O'War Steps to the Northern Suburbs Crematorium with much of the route lined with onlookers. After a short service, his ashes were interred under a tree marked by a simple metal plaque.

The National Bank of Australasia gave Dorothy a gratuity of £250, sufficient to purchase a cottage near Manly so she could be close to friends and family. In March 1939, Sullivan's mother presented an enlarged photograph of her son to the Crystal Brook Primary School. In the same year, a bronze plaque was made by a member of the ACC, but owing to World War II it was not placed upon the iron railings of Wellington Barracks, close to where Sullivan was killed, until January 1946. Dorothy attended the 1956 VC centenary celebrations in London, with her travel costs picked up by the National Bank of Australasia. When she died in 1980, she left his medal set, including the VC and King George VI Coronation Medal, to the Australian War Memorial in Canberra. They are displayed in the Hall of Valour. In 1996, the Vietnam veteran Keith Payne VC unveiled a plaque in Crystal Brook dedicated to him. In 2015, a memorial to Sullivan was unveiled in Crystal Brook. His name is inscribed on the Maitland War Memorial.
