= Malyshi =

Malyshi Малыши
- Village
- Location within Perm Krai Location within Russia
- Coordinates: 57°36′N 57°39′E
- Country: Russia
- Region: Perm Krai
- District: Beryozovsky District
- Time zone: UTC+5:00

Malyshi (Russian: Малыши) is a rural locality (a village) in Klyapovskoye Rural Settlement, Beryozovsky District, Perm Krai, Russia. The population was 143 as of 2010. There are 3 streets.

== Geography ==
Malyshi is located on the Barda River, 28 km east of Beryozovka (the district's administrative centre) by road. Zernino is the nearest rural locality.
