= Konetsgorskaya narrow-gauge railway =

Coordinates: 62.66821°N 43.41518°E

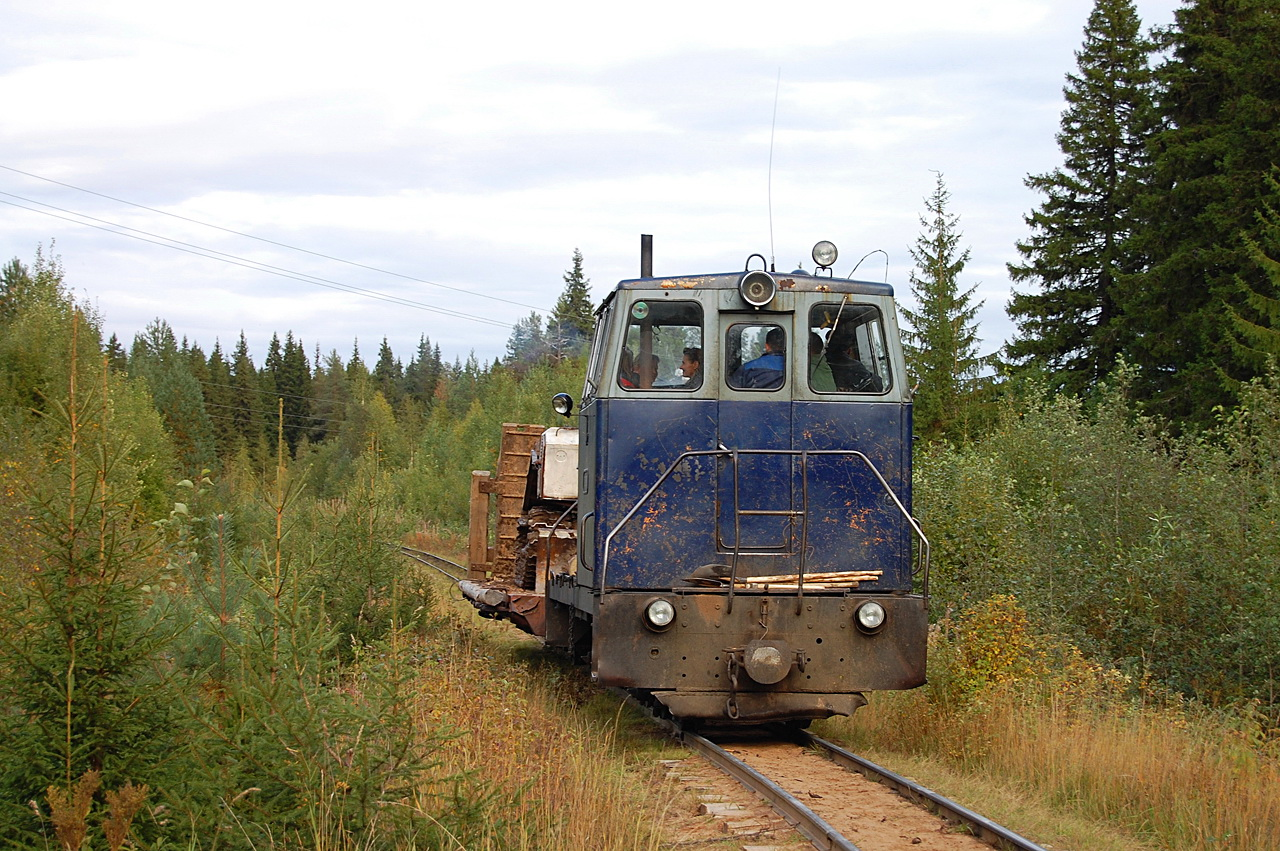

Overview
- Locale: Arkhangelsk Oblast, Russia
- Termini: Rochegda
- Website: www.solombala.com

Service
- Type: Narrow-gauge railway
- Operator: LZP Konetsgorsky

History
- Opened: 1942

Technical
- Line length: 80 kilometres (50 mi)
- Track gauge: 750 mm (2 ft 5 1/2 in)
Route map
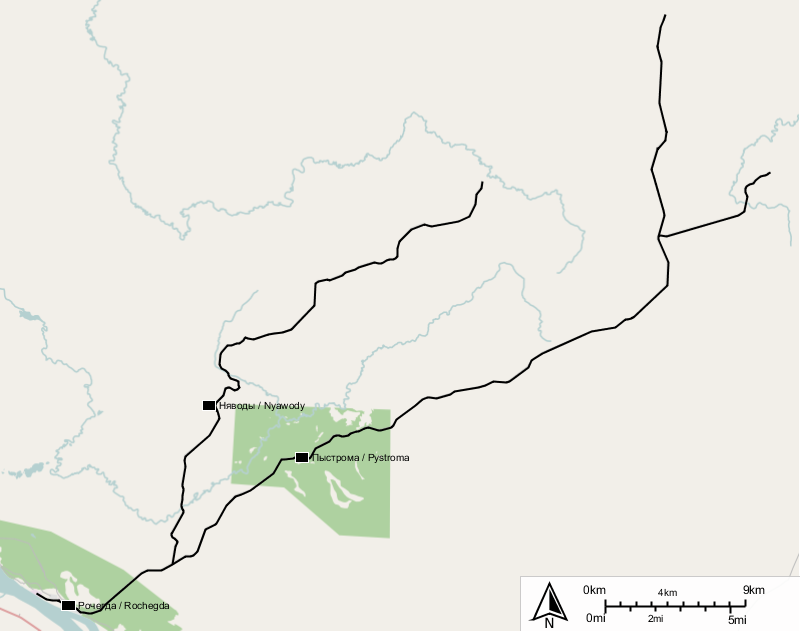

The Konetsgorskaya narrow-gauge railway is located in Arkhangelsk Oblast, Russia. The forest railway was opened in 1942, has a total length of 80 kilometres (50 mi) and is operational as of 2015. The track gauge is 750 mm (2 ft 5 1/2 in) and operates year-round.

== Current status ==
The Konetsgorskaya forestry railway's first line was constructed in 1942, in the area of Vinogradovsky District, Arkhangelsk Oblast from the village Rochegda. The total length of the Konetsgorskaya narrow-gauge railway at the peak of its development exceeded 153 kilometres (95 mi), of which 80 kilometres (50 mi) is currently operational. The railway operates scheduled freight services from Rochegda, used for forestry tasks such as the transportation of felled logs and forestry workers. In 2015, repairs are being made to the track.

== Rolling stock ==
=== Locomotives ===
- TU7 – № 2304, 1710, 1331, 1437, 3290
- TU6A – № 3017, 3109
- TU6SPA – № 005
- TU8 – № 0012
- TD-5U "Pioneer"

=== Railroad cars ===
- Boxcar
- Tank car
- Snowplow
- Dining car
- Passenger car
- DM-20 «Loglift»
- Railway log-car and Flatcar
- Hopper car to transport track ballast

== Gallery ==
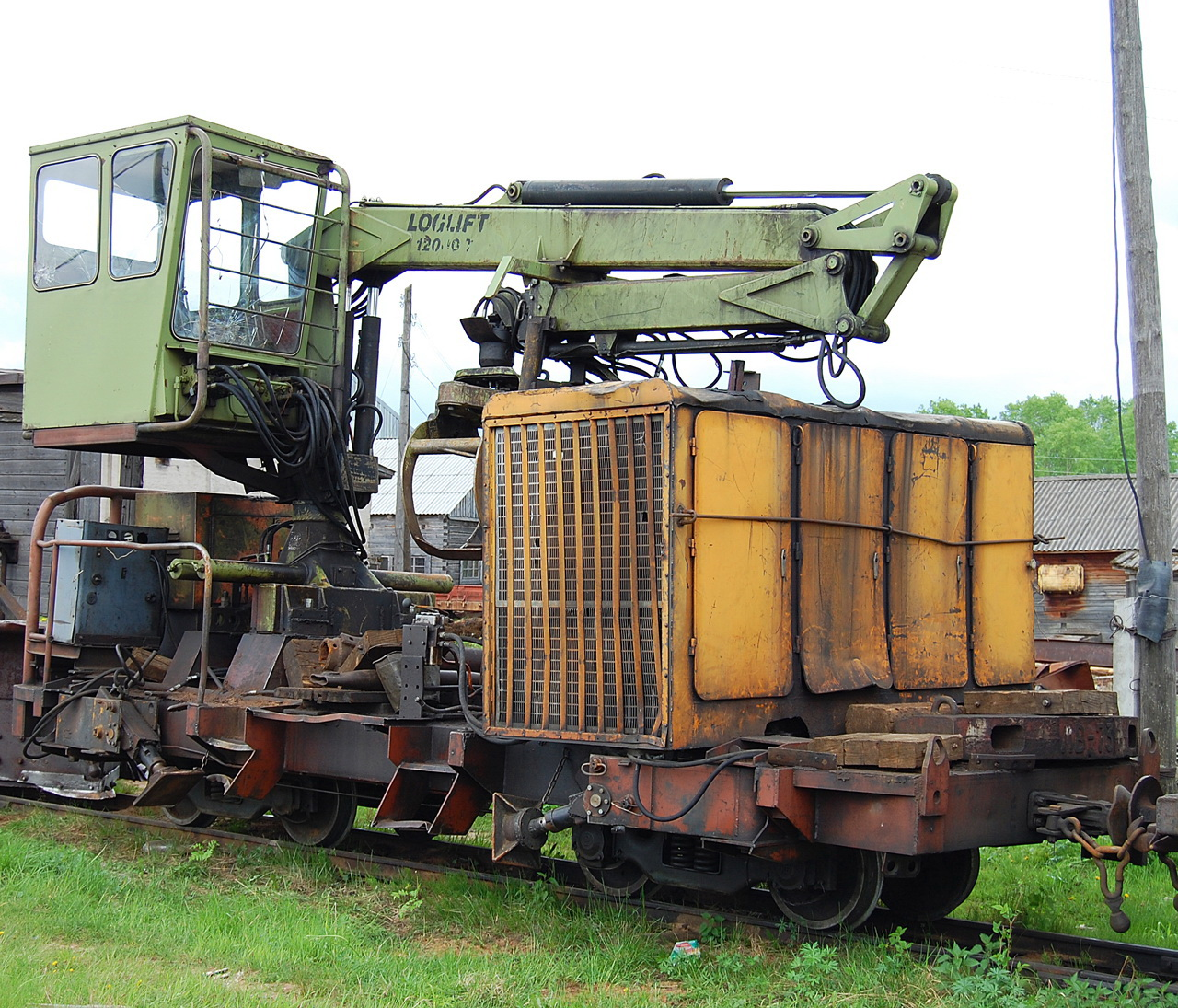
DM-20 «Loglift»

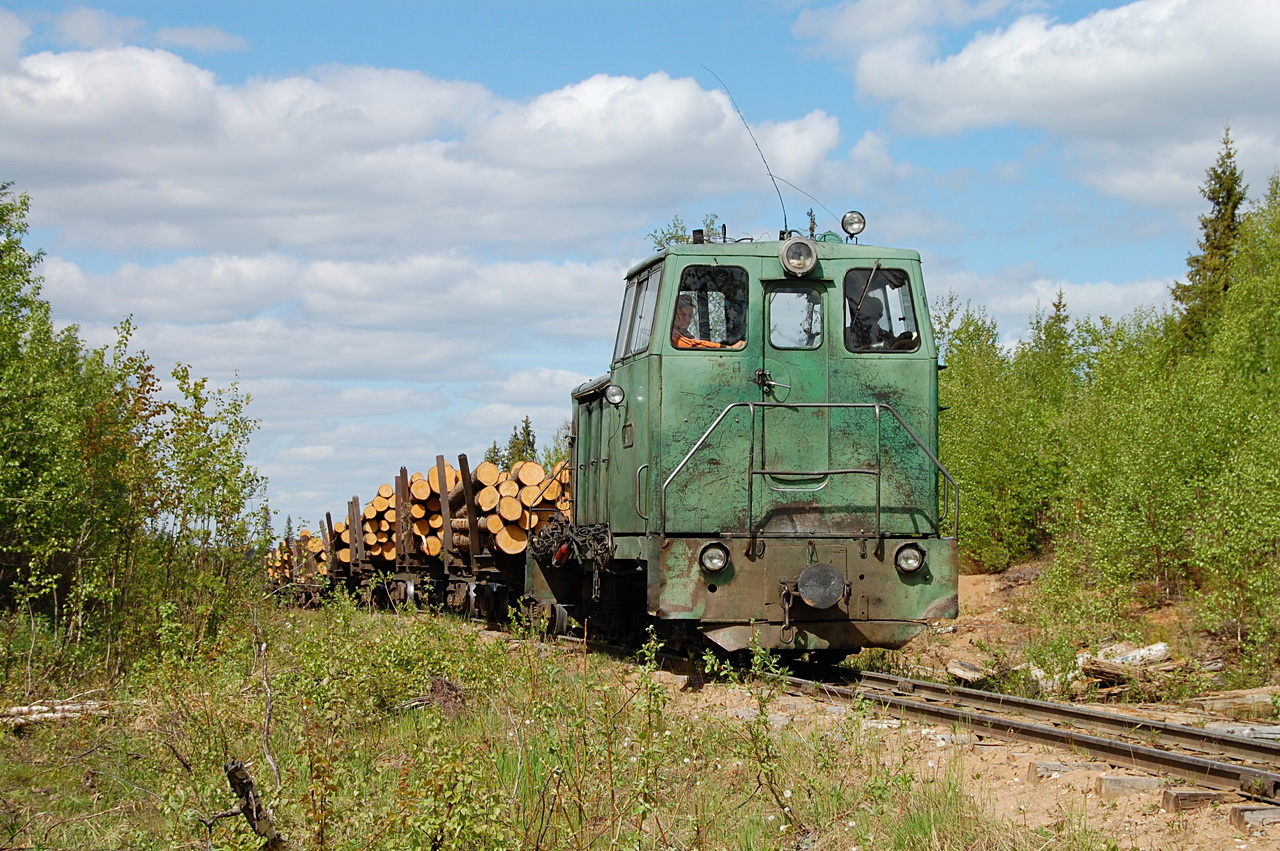
Locomotive TU7 – № 2304

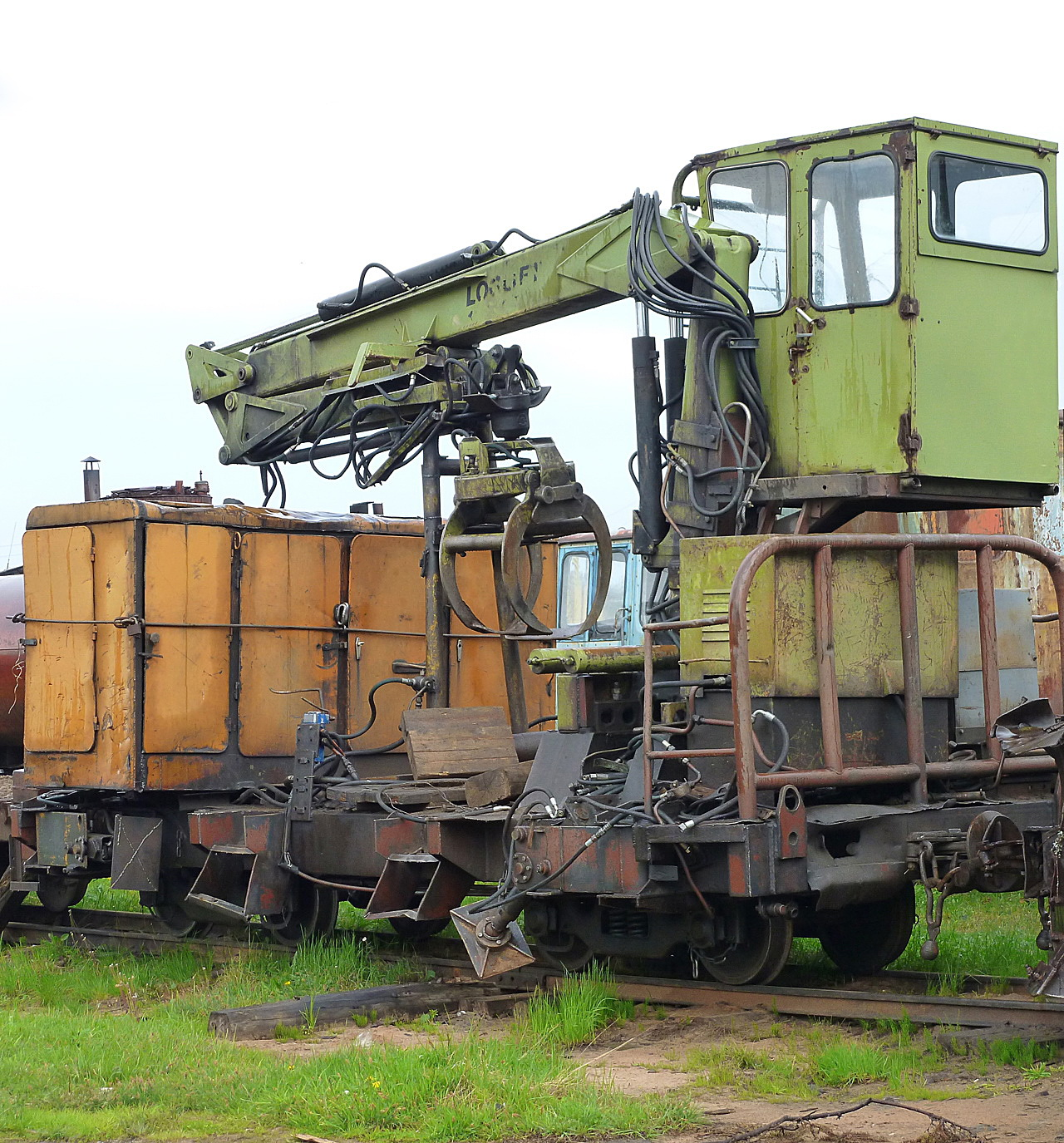
DM-20 «Loglift»

== See also ==
- Narrow-gauge railways in Russia
