= Kopchikovo =

Kopchikovo Копчиково
- Village
- Location within Perm Krai Location within Russia
- Coordinates: 57°38′N 57°21′E
- Country: Russia
- Region: Perm Krai
- District: Beryozovsky District
- Time zone: UTC+5:00

Kopchikovo (Russian: Копчиково) is a rural locality (a village) in Beryozovskoye Rural Settlement, Beryozovsky District, Perm Krai, Russia. The population was 391 as of 2010. There are 6 streets.

== Geography ==
Kopchikovo is located on the Shakva River, 7 km northeast of Beryozovka (the district's administrative centre) by road. Bartym is the nearest rural locality.
