= Tulumbasy =

Tulumbasy Тулумбасы
- Settlement
- Location within Perm Krai Location within Russia
- Coordinates: 57°25′N 57°37′E
- Country: Russia
- Region: Perm Krai
- District: Beryozovsky District
- Time zone: UTC+5:00

Tulumbasy (Russian: Тулумбасы) is a rural locality (a settlement) in Asovskoye Rural Settlement, Beryozovsky District, Perm Krai, Russia. The population was 109 as of 2010. There are 7 streets.

== Geography ==
Tulumbasy is located 32 km southeast of Beryozovka (the district's administrative centre) by road. Sosnovka is the nearest rural locality.
