= Antonkovo =

Antonkovo Антонково
- Village
- Location within Perm Krai Location within Russia
- Coordinates: 57°41′N 57°13′E
- Country: Russia
- Region: Perm Krai
- District: Beryozovsky District
- Time zone: UTC+5:00

Antonkovo (Russian: Антонково) is a rural locality (a village) in Dubovskoye Rural Settlement, Beryozovsky District, Perm Krai, Russia. The population was 135 as of 2010. There are 7 streets.

== Geography ==
It is located on the Saya River, 16 km northwest of Beryozovka (the district's administrative centre) by road. Rassokhi is the nearest rural locality.
