= Makhtyata =

Makhtyata Махтята
- Village
- Location within Perm Krai Location within Russia
- Coordinates: 57°40′N 57°27′E
- Country: Russia
- Region: Perm Krai
- District: Beryozovsky District
- Time zone: UTC+5:00

Makhtyata (Russian: Махтята) is a rural locality (a village) in Beryozovsky District, Perm Krai, Russia. The population was 26 as of 2010.

== Geography ==
Makhtyata is located 15 km northeast of Beryozovka (the district's administrative centre) by road. Malaya Sosnovka is the nearest rural locality.
