= Uyta =

Uyta Уйта
- Village
- Location within Arkhangelsk Oblast Location within Russia
- Coordinates: 63°00′N 42°31′E
- Country: Russia
- Region: Arkhangelsk Oblast
- District: Vinogradovsky District
- Time zone: UTC+3:00

Uyta (Russian: Уйта) is a rural locality (a village) in Morzhegorskoye Rural Settlement of Vinogradovsky District, Arkhangelsk Oblast, Russia. The population was 202 as of 2010. There are 6 streets.

== Geography ==
Uyta is located on the Severnaya Dvina River, 24 km north of Bereznik (the district's administrative centre) by road. Shastki is the nearest rural locality.
