= Karnaukhovo =

Karnaukhovo (Russian: Карнаухово) is the name of several rural localities in Russia:

- Karnaukhovo, Beryozovskoye Rural Settlement, Beryozovsky District, Perm Krai, a village in Beryozovskoye Rural Settlement, Beryozovsky District, Perm Krai
- Karnaukhovo, Zaboryinskoye Rural Settlement, Beryozovsky District, Perm Krai, a village in Zaboryinskoye Rural Settlement, Beryozovsky District, Perm Krai
