= Starkovo =

Starkovo Старково
- Village
- Location within Perm Krai Location within Russia
- Coordinates: 57°37′N 57°18′E
- Country: Russia
- Region: Perm Krai
- District: Beryozovsky District
- Time zone: UTC+5:00

Starkovo (Russian: Старково) is a rural locality (a village) in Pereborskoye Rural Settlement, Beryozovsky District, Perm Krai, Russia. The population was 14 as of 2010.

== Geography ==
Starkovo is located on the Shakva River, 4 km north of Beryozovka (the district's administrative centre) by road. Shishkino is the nearest rural locality.
