= Uraskovo =

Uraskovo Урасково
- Village
- Location within Perm Krai Location within Russia
- Coordinates: 57°40′N 57°19′E
- Country: Russia
- Region: Perm Krai
- District: Beryozovsky District
- Time zone: UTC+5:00

Uraskovo (Russian: Урасково) is a rural locality (a village) in Pereborskoye Rural Settlement, Beryozovsky District, Perm Krai, Russia. The population was 62 as of 2010. There are 2 streets.

== Geography ==
Uraskovo is located on the Shakva River, 12 km north of Beryozovka, the district's administrative centre, by road. Shakva is the nearest rural locality.
