= Gridinskaya =

Gridinskaya (Russian: Гридинская) is the name of several rural localities in Russia:

- Gridinskaya, Velsky District, Arkhangelsk Oblast, a selo in Khozminskoye Rural Settlement of Verkhnetoyemsky District, Arkhangelsk Oblast
- Gridinskaya, Vinogradovsky District, Arkhangelsk Oblast, a selo in Boretskoye Rural Settlement of Vinogradovsky District, Arkhangelsk Oblast
