= Shuzhega =

Shuzhega Шужега
- Village
- Location within Arkhangelsk Oblast Location within Russia
- Coordinates: 62°41′N 43°17′E
- Country: Russia
- Region: Arkhangelsk Oblast
- District: Vinogradovsky District
- Time zone: UTC+3:00

Shuzhega (Russian: Шужега) is a rural locality (a village) in Vinogradovsky District, Arkhangelsk Oblast, Russia. The population was five as of 2010.

== Geography ==
Shuzhega is located on the Severnaya Dvina River, 47 km southeast of Bereznik (the district's administrative centre) by road. Pleso is the nearest rural locality.
