= Zaborye =

Zaborye (Russian: Заборье) is the name of several rural localities in Russia:

- Zaborye, Vinogradovsky District, Arkhangelsk Oblast, a village in Vinogradovsky District, Arkhangelsk Oblast
- Zaborye, Beryozovsky District, Perm Krai, a village in Beryozovsky District, Perm Krai
