= Baykino =

Baykino Байкино
- Village
- Location within Perm Krai Location within Russia
- Coordinates: 57°30′N 57°18′E
- Country: Russia
- Region: Perm Krai
- District: Beryozovsky District
- Time zone: UTC+5:00

Baykino (Russian: Байкино) is a rural locality (a village) in Zaboryinskoye Rural Settlement, Beryozovsky District, Perm Krai, Russia. The population was 84 as of 2010. There are 2 streets.

== Geography ==
Baykino is located 18 km south of Beryozovka (the district's administrative centre) by road. Taz Russky is the nearest rural locality.
