= Ust-Vaga =

Ust-Vaga Усть-Вага
- Village
- Location within Arkhangelsk Oblast Location within Russia
- Coordinates: 62°44′N 42°49′E
- Country: Russia
- Region: Arkhangelsk Oblast
- District: Vinogradovsky District
- Time zone: UTC+3:00

Ust-Vaga (Russian: Усть-Вага) is a rural locality (a village) in Bereznikovskoye Rural Settlement of Vinogradovsky District, Arkhangelsk Oblast, Russia. The population was 199 as of 2010.

== Geography ==
Ust-Vaga is located on the Vaga River, 18 km southeast of Bereznik (the district's administrative centre) by road. Zaborye is the nearest rural locality.
