= Podvoloshino =

Podvoloshino Подволошино
- Village
- Location within Perm Krai Location within Russia
- Coordinates: 57°33′N 57°47′E
- Country: Russia
- Region: Perm Krai
- District: Beryozovsky District
- Time zone: UTC+5:00

Podvoloshino (Russian: Подволошино) is a rural locality (a village) in Asovskoye Rural Settlement, Beryozovsky District, Perm Krai, Russia. The population was 190 as of 2010. There are 5 streets.

== Geography ==
Podvoloshino is located 35 km southeast of Beryozovka (the district's administrative centre) by road. Shestaki is the nearest rural locality.
