= Issinyayevo =

Issinyayevo Иссиняево
- Village
- Location within Perm Krai Location within Russia
- Coordinates: 57°33′N 57°11′E
- Country: Russia
- Region: Perm Krai
- District: Beryozovsky District
- Time zone: UTC+5:00

Issinyayevo (Russian: Иссиняево) is a rural locality (a village) in Zaboryinskoye Rural Settlement, Beryozovsky District, Perm Krai, Russia. The population was 65 as of 2010.

== Geography ==
It is located on the Shakva River, 13 km southwest of Beryozovka (the district's administrative centre) by road. Karnaukhovo is the nearest rural locality.
