= Gora, Vinogradovsky District, Arkhangelsk Oblast =

Gora Гора
- Village
- Location within Arkhangelsk Oblast Location within Russia
- Coordinates: 63°01′26″N 42°25′01″E
- Country: Russia
- Region: Arkhangelsk Oblast
- District: Vinogradovsky District
- Time zone: UTC+3:00

Gora (Russian: Гора) is a rural locality (a village) in Vinogradovsky District, Arkhangelsk Oblast, Russia. The population was 35, as of 2012.

== Geography ==
Gora is located on the Severnaya Dvina River, 29 km northwest of Bereznik (the district's administrative centre) by road. Shastki is the nearest rural locality.
