= Vanino, Perm Krai =

Vanino Ванино
- Village
- Location within Perm Krai Location within Russia
- Coordinates: 57°36′N 57°16′E
- Country: Russia
- Region: Perm Krai
- District: Beryozovsky District
- Time zone: UTC+5:00

Vanino (Russian: Ванино) is a rural locality (a village) in Beryozovskoye Rural Settlement, Beryozovsky District, Perm Krai, Russia. The population was 34 as of 2010.

== Geography ==
Vanino is located on the Shakva River, 4 km northwest of Beryozovka (the district's administrative centre) by road. Yaburovo is the nearest rural locality.
