= Sloboda, Vinogradovsky District =

Sloboda Слобода
- Village
- Location within Arkhangelsk Oblast Location within Russia
- Coordinates: 62°53′N 42°41′E
- Country: Russia
- Region: Arkhangelsk Oblast
- District: Vinogradovsky District
- Time zone: UTC+3:00

Sloboda (Russian: Слобода) is a rural locality (a village) in Osinovskoye Rural Settlement of Vinogradovsky District, Arkhangelsk Oblast, Russia. The population was 64 as of 2010.

== Geography ==
Sloboda is located on the Severnaya Dvina River, 7 km north of Bereznik (the district's administrative centre) by road. Verkhneye Chazhestrovo is the nearest rural locality.
