= Verkhniye Isady =

Verkhniye Isady Верхние Исады
- Village
- Location within Perm Krai Location within Russia
- Coordinates: 57°42′N 57°36′E
- Country: Russia
- Region: Perm Krai
- District: Beryozovsky District
- Time zone: UTC+5:00

Verkhniye Isady (Russian: Верхние Исады) is a rural locality (a village) in Beryozovsky District, Perm Krai, Russia. The population was 8 as of 2010.

== Geography ==
Verkhniye Isady is located 25 km northeast of Beryozovka (the district's administrative centre) by road. Nizhniye Isady is the nearest rural locality.
