= Yaburovo =

Yaburovo Ябурово
- Village
- Location within Perm Krai Location within Russia
- Coordinates: 57°36′N 57°16′E
- Country: Russia
- Region: Perm Krai
- District: Beryozovsky District
- Time zone: UTC+5:00

Yaburovo (Russian: Ябурово) is a rural locality (a village) in Beryozovskoye Rural Settlement, Beryozovsky District, Perm Krai, Russia. The population was 19 as of 2010.

== Geography ==
Yaburovo is located on the Shakva River, 5 km west of Beryozovka, the district's administrative centre, by road. Vanino is the nearest rural locality.
