= Vazhsky =

Vazhsky Важский
- Settlement
- Location within Arkhangelsk Oblast Location within Russia
- Coordinates: 62°38′N 42°57′E
- Country: Russia
- Region: Arkhangelsk Oblast
- District: Vinogradovsky District
- Time zone: UTC+3:00

Vazhsky (Russian: Важский) is a rural locality (a settlement) in Kitskoye Rural Settlement of Vinogradovsky District, Arkhangelsk Oblast, Russia. The population was 423 as of 2010. There are 6 streets.

== Geography ==
Vazhsky is located on the Vaga River, 32 km southeast of Bereznik (the district's administrative centre) by road. Bereznichek is the nearest rural locality.
