= Demidyata =

Demidyata Демидята
- Village
- Location within Perm Krai Location within Russia
- Coordinates: 57°36′N 57°37′E
- Country: Russia
- Region: Perm Krai
- District: Beryozovsky District
- Time zone: UTC+5:00

Demidyata (Russian: Демидята) is a rural locality (a village) in Klyapovskoye Rural Settlement, Beryozovsky District, Perm Krai, Russia. The population was 2 as of 2010.

== Geography ==
Demidyata is located on the Barda River, 25 km east of Beryozovka (the district's administrative centre) by road. Zernino is the nearest rural locality.
