= Rodionovskaya =

Rodionovskaya Родионовская
- Village
- Location within Arkhangelsk Oblast Location within Russia
- Coordinates: 63°02′N 42°11′E
- Country: Russia
- Region: Arkhangelsk Oblast
- District: Vinogradovsky District
- Time zone: UTC+3:00

Rodionovskaya (Russian: Родионовская) is a rural locality (a village) in Rochegodskoye Rural Settlement of Vinogradovsky District, Arkhangelsk Oblast, Russia. The population was 117 as of 2010. There is 1 street.

== Geography ==
Rodionovskaya is located on the Severnaya Dvina River, 41 km northwest of Bereznik (the district's administrative centre) by road. Morzhegory is the nearest rural locality.
