= Taranysh =

Taranysh Тараныш
- Village
- Location within Perm Krai Location within Russia
- Coordinates: 57°42′N 57°28′E
- Country: Russia
- Region: Perm Krai
- District: Beryozovsky District
- Time zone: UTC+5:00

Taranysh (Russian: Тараныш) is a rural locality (a village) in Beryozovsky District, Perm Krai, Russia. The population was 10 as of 2010.

== Geography ==
Taranysh is located 18 km northeast of Beryozovka (the district's administrative centre) by road. Martely is the nearest rural locality.
