= Vayenga =

Vayenga or Vaenga may refer to:

- Vayenga, former name of Severomorsk, a town in Murmansk Oblast, Russia
- Elena Vaenga (b. 1977), Russian singer, songwriter, and actress
- Vayenga (Northern Dvina), a river in Arkhangelsk Oblast, Russia
- Vayenga (Barents Sea), a river in Murmansk Oblast, Russia
- Vayenga Bay, a bay in Murmansk Oblast, Russia, the mouth of the Vayenga River
- Vaenga, a tapere (sub-district) of Matavera, the island of Rarotonga in the Cook Islands
