= Samokhino =

Samokhino Самохино
- Village
- Location within Perm Krai Location within Russia
- Coordinates: 57°31′N 57°45′E
- Country: Russia
- Region: Perm Krai
- District: Beryozovsky District
- Time zone: UTC+5:00

Samokhino (Russian: Самохино) is a rural locality (a village) in Asovskoye Rural Settlement, Beryozovsky District, Perm Krai, Russia. The population was 20 as of 2010. There is 1 street.

== Geography ==
Samokhino is located on the Asovka River, 33 km southeast of Beryozovka (the district's administrative centre) by road. Polushkino is the nearest rural locality.
