= Podperebor =

Podperebor Подперебор
- Village
- Location within Perm Krai Location within Russia
- Coordinates: 57°42′N 57°18′E
- Country: Russia
- Region: Perm Krai
- District: Beryozovsky District
- Time zone: UTC+5:00

Podperebor (Russian: Подперебор) is a rural locality (a village) in Pereborskoye Rural Settlement, Beryozovsky District, Perm Krai, Russia. The population was 3 as of 2010.

== Geography ==
Podperebor is located on the Shakva River, 20 km north of Beryozovka (the district's administrative centre) by road. Perebor is the nearest rural locality.
