= Konetsgorye =

Rural localities in Arkhangelsk Oblast, Russia

Konetsgorye (Russian: Конецгорье) is the name of several rural localities in Arkhangelsk Oblast, Russia:

- Konetsgorye, Pinezhsky District, Arkhangelsk Oblast, a village in Trufanogorsky Selsoviet of Pinezhsky District
- Konetsgorye, Plesetsky District, Arkhangelsk Oblast, a village in Tarasovsky Selsoviet of Plesetsky District
- Konetsgorye, Primorsky District, Arkhangelsk Oblast, a village in Lyavlensky Selsoviet of Primorsky District
- Konetsgorye, Vinogradovsky District, Arkhangelsk Oblast, a village in Konetsgorsky Selsoviet of Vinogradovsky District
