= Nizhnyaya Vayenga =

Nizhnyaya Vayenga Нижняя Ваеньга
- Village
- Location within Arkhangelsk Oblast Location within Russia
- Coordinates: 62°55′N 42°55′E
- Country: Russia
- Region: Arkhangelsk Oblast
- District: Vinogradovsky District
- Time zone: UTC+3:00

Nizhnyaya Vayenga (Russian: Нижняя Ваеньга) is a rural locality (a village) in Vinogradovsky District, Arkhangelsk Oblast, Russia. The population was 9 as of 2010. There are 3 streets.

== Geography ==
Nizhnyaya Vayenga is located on the Vayenga River, 16 km northeast of Bereznik (the district's administrative centre) by road.
