= Nizhnyaya Topsa =

Nizhnyaya Topsa Нижняя Топса
- Village
- Location within Arkhangelsk Oblast Location within Russia
- Coordinates: 62°36′N 43°37′E
- Country: Russia
- Region: Arkhangelsk Oblast
- District: Vinogradovsky District
- Time zone: UTC+3:00

Nizhnyaya Topsa (Russian: Нижняя Топса) is a rural locality (a village) in Vinogradovsky District, Arkhangelsk Oblast, Russia. The population was 31 as of 2010. There are 2 streets.

== Geography ==
Nizhnyaya Topsa is located on the Topsa River, 62 km southeast of Bereznik (the district's administrative centre) by road. Nikitinskaya is the nearest rural locality.
