= Tugarinskaya =

Tugarinskaya Тугаринская
- Village
- Location within Arkhangelsk Oblast Location within Russia
- Coordinates: 62°37′N 43°39′E
- Country: Russia
- Region: Arkhangelsk Oblast
- District: Vinogradovsky District
- Time zone: UTC+3:00

Tugarinskaya (Russian: Тугаринская) is a rural locality (a village) in Vinogradovsky District, Arkhangelsk Oblast, Russia. The population was 11 as of 2010.

== Geography ==
Tugarinskaya is located 64 km southeast of Bereznik (the district's administrative centre) by road. Nizhnyaya Topsa is the nearest rural locality.
