= Gusevo, Vinogradovsky District, Arkhangelsk Oblast =

Gusevo Гусево
- Village
- Location within Arkhangelsk Oblast Location within Russia
- Coordinates: 62°48′N 43°03′E
- Country: Russia
- Region: Arkhangelsk Oblast
- District: Vinogradovsky District
- Time zone: UTC+3:00

Gusevo (Russian: Гусево) is a rural locality (a village) in Vinogradovsky District, Arkhangelsk Oblast, Russia. The population was 2 as of 2010.

== Geography ==
Gusevo is located 20 km southeast of Bereznik (the district's administrative centre) by road. Korbala is the nearest rural locality.
