= Osinovo =

Osinovo (Russian: Осиново) is the name of several rural localities in Russia:

- Osinovo, Arkhangelsk Oblast, a village in Vinogradovsky District, Arkhangelsk Oblast
- Osinovo, Perm Krai, a village in Beryozovsky District, Perm Krai
