= Metalnikovo =

Metalnikovo Метальниково
- Village
- Location within Perm Krai Location within Russia
- Coordinates: 57°37′N 57°11′E
- Country: Russia
- Region: Perm Krai
- District: Beryozovsky District
- Time zone: UTC+5:00

Metalnikovo (Russian: Метальниково) is a rural locality (a village) in Dubovskoye Rural Settlement, Beryozovsky District, Perm Krai, Russia. The population was 120 as of 2010. There are 3 streets.

== Geography ==
Metalnikovo is located 9 km northwest of Beryozovka (the district's administrative centre) by road. Sazhino is the nearest rural locality.
