= Gladkovo =

Gladkovo Гладково
- Village
- Location within Perm Krai Location within Russia
- Coordinates: 57°34′N 57°17′E
- Country: Russia
- Region: Perm Krai
- District: Beryozovsky District
- Time zone: UTC+5:00

Gladkovo (Russian: Гладково) is a rural locality (a village) in Zaboryinskoye Rural Settlement, Beryozovsky District, Perm Krai, Russia. The population was 10 as of 2010.

== Geography ==
Gladkovo is located on the Sharlanka River, 7 km southwest of Beryozovka (the district's administrative centre) by road. Klychi is the nearest rural locality.
