= Vankino =

Vankino Ванькино
- Village
- Location within Perm Krai Location within Russia
- Coordinates: 57°44′N 57°15′E
- Country: Russia
- Region: Perm Krai
- District: Beryozovsky District
- Time zone: UTC+5:00

Vankino (Russian: Ванькино) is a rural locality (a village) in Pereborskoye Rural Settlement, Beryozovsky District, Perm Krai, Russia. The population was 289 as of 2010. There are 7 streets.

== Geography ==
Vankino is located on the Shakva River, 26 km north of Beryozovka (the district's administrative centre) by road. Yermolino is the nearest rural locality.
