= Khetovo =

Khetovo Хетово
- Settlement
- Location within Arkhangelsk Oblast Location within Russia
- Coordinates: 63°02′N 42°20′E
- Country: Russia
- Region: Arkhangelsk Oblast
- District: Vinogradovsky District
- Time zone: UTC+3:00

Khetovo (Russian: Хетово) is a rural locality (a settlement) and the administrative center of Morzhegorskoye Rural Settlement of Vinogradovsky District, Arkhangelsk Oblast, Russia. The population was 454 as of 2010. There are 9 streets.

== Geography ==
Khetovo is located on the Severnaya Dvina River, 33 km northwest of Bereznik (the district's administrative centre) by road.
