= Polchata =

Polchata Полчата
- Village
- Location within Perm Krai Location within Russia
- Coordinates: 57°37′N 57°28′E
- Country: Russia
- Region: Perm Krai
- District: Beryozovsky District
- Time zone: UTC+5:00

Polchata (Russian: Полчата) is a rural locality (a village) in Beryozovsky District, Perm Krai, Russia. The population was 4 as of 2010.

== Geography ==
Polchata is located 21 km northeast of Beryozovka (the district's administrative centre) by road. Tuyasy is the nearest rural locality.
