= Tarnaboyevo =

Tarnaboyevo Тарнабоево
- Village
- Location within Perm Krai Location within Russia
- Coordinates: 57°31′N 57°10′E
- Country: Russia
- Region: Perm Krai
- District: Beryozovsky District
- Time zone: UTC+5:00

Tarnaboyevo (Russian: Тарнабоево) is a rural locality (a village) in Zaboryinskoye Rural Settlement, Beryozovsky District, Perm Krai, Russia. The population was 12 as of 2010.

== Geography ==
Tarnaboyevo is located on the Shakva River, 17 km southwest of Beryozovka (the district's administrative centre) by road. Karnaukhovo is the nearest rural locality.
