= Pozdyanka =

Pozdyanka Поздянка
- Village
- Location within Perm Krai Location within Russia
- Coordinates: 57°46′N 57°14′E
- Country: Russia
- Region: Perm Krai
- District: Beryozovsky District
- Time zone: UTC+5:00

Pozdyanka (Russian: Поздянка) is a rural locality (a village) in Pereborskoye Rural Settlement, Beryozovsky District, Perm Krai, Russia. The population was 20 as of 2010. There are 5 streets.

== Geography ==
Pozdyanka is located 32 km north of Beryozovka (the district's administrative centre) by road. Kuliga is the nearest rural locality.
