= Zadorikha =

Zadorikha Задориха
- Village
- Location within Arkhangelsk Oblast Location within Russia
- Coordinates: 62°27′N 43°55′E
- Country: Russia
- Region: Arkhangelsk Oblast
- District: Vinogradovsky District
- Time zone: UTC+3:00

Zadorikha (Russian: Задориха) is a rural locality (a village) in Boretskoye Rural Settlement of Vinogradovsky District, Arkhangelsk Oblast, Russia. The population was 22 as of 2010.

== Geography ==
Zadorikha is located on the Severnaya Dvina River, 84 km southeast of Bereznik (the district's administrative centre) by road. Skobeli is the nearest rural locality.
