= Taz Russky =

Taz Russky Таз Русский
- Selo
- Location within Perm Krai Location within Russia
- Coordinates: 57°31′N 57°22′E
- Country: Russia
- Region: Perm Krai
- District: Beryozovsky District
- Time zone: UTC+5:00

Taz Russky (Russian: Таз Русский) is a rural locality (a selo) in Klyapovskoye Rural Settlement, Beryozovsky District, Perm Krai, Russia. The population was 175 as of 2010. There are 6 streets.

== Geography ==
It is located on the Taz River, 13 km southeast of Beryozovka (the district's administrative centre) by road. Taz Tatarsky is the nearest rural locality.
