= Klyapovo =

Klyapovo Кляпово
- Village
- Location within Perm Krai Location within Russia
- Coordinates: 57°34′N 57°23′E
- Country: Russia
- Region: Perm Krai
- District: Beryozovsky District
- Time zone: UTC+5:00

Klyapovo (Russian: Кляпово) is a rural locality (a village) and the administrative center of Klyapovskoye Rural Settlement, Beryozovsky District, Perm Krai, Russia. The population was 505 as of 2010. There are 8 streets.

== Geography ==
Klyapovo is located 7 km southeast of Beryozovka (the district's administrative centre) by road. Osinovo is the nearest rural locality.
