= Basargi =

Basargi Басарги
- Village
- Location within Perm Krai Location within Russia
- Coordinates: 57°35′N 57°40′E
- Country: Russia
- Region: Perm Krai
- District: Beryozovsky District
- Time zone: UTC+5:00

Basargi (Russian: Басарги) is a rural locality (a village) in Asovskoye Rural Settlement, Beryozovsky District, Perm Krai, Russia. The population was 4 as of 2010.

== Geography ==
Basargi is located 30 km east of Beryozovka (the district's administrative centre) by road. Malyshi is the nearest rural locality.
