= Korbala =

Korbala Корбала
- Village
- Location within Arkhangelsk Oblast Location within Russia
- Coordinates: 62°48′N 43°05′E
- Country: Russia
- Region: Arkhangelsk Oblast
- District: Vinogradovsky District
- Time zone: UTC+3:00

Korbala (Russian: Корбала) is a rural locality (a village) in Osinovskoye Rural Settlement of Vinogradovsky District, Arkhangelsk Oblast, Russia. The population was 4 as of 2010.

== Geography ==
Korbala is located 22 km southeast of Bereznik (the district's administrative centre) by road. Gusevo is the nearest rural locality.
