= Kostyata =

Kostyata Костята
- Village
- Location within Perm Krai Location within Russia
- Coordinates: 57°35′N 57°27′E
- Country: Russia
- Region: Perm Krai
- District: Beryozovsky District
- Time zone: UTC+5:00

Kostyata (Russian: Костята) is a rural locality (a village) in Klyapovskoye Rural Settlement, Beryozovsky District, Perm Krai, Russia. The population was 6 as of 2010.

== Geography ==
Kostyata is located 15 km southeast of Beryozovka (the district's administrative centre) by road. Galashino is the nearest rural locality.
