= Shakva =

Shakva Шаква
- Village
- Location within Perm Krai Location within Russia
- Coordinates: 57°39′N 57°19′E
- Country: Russia
- Region: Perm Krai
- District: Beryozovsky District
- Time zone: UTC+5:00

Shakva (Russian: Шаква) is a rural locality (a village) in Pereborskoye Rural Settlement, Beryozovsky District, Perm Krai, Russia. The population was 75 as of 2010. There are 5 streets.

== Geography ==
Shakva is located on the Shakva River, 10 km north of Beryozovka, the district's administrative centre, by road. Slobodka is the nearest rural locality.
