= Verkhneye-Chazhestrovo =

Verkhneye-Chazhestrovo Верхнее Чажестрово
- Village
- Location within Arkhangelsk Oblast Location within Russia
- Coordinates: 62°52′N 42°39′E
- Country: Russia
- Region: Arkhangelsk Oblast
- District: Vinogradovsky District
- Time zone: UTC+3:00

Verkhneye-Chazhestrovo (Russian: Верхнее Чажестрово) is a rural locality (a village) in Bereznikovskoye Rural Settlement of Vinogradovsky District, Arkhangelsk Oblast, Russia. The population was 205 as of 2010. There is 1 street.

== Geography ==
Verkhneye-Chazhestrovo is located on the Severnaya Dvina River, 4 km northwest of Bereznik (the district's administrative centre) by road. Bereznik is the nearest rural locality.
