= Pirozhkovo =

Pirozhkovo Пирожково
- Village
- Location within Perm Krai Location within Russia
- Coordinates: 57°35′N 57°16′E
- Country: Russia
- Region: Perm Krai
- District: Beryozovsky District
- Time zone: UTC+5:00

Pirozhkovo (Russian: Пирожково) is a rural locality (a village) in Zaboryinskoye Rural Settlement, Beryozovsky District, Perm Krai, Russia. The population was 48 as of 2010.

== Geography ==
Pirozhkovo is located 3 km southwest of Beryozovka (the district's administrative centre) by road. Shumkovo is the nearest rural locality.
