= Sazhino =

Sazhino Сажино
- Selo
- Location within Perm Krai Location within Russia
- Coordinates: 57°37′N 57°07′E
- Country: Russia
- Region: Perm Krai
- District: Beryozovsky District
- Time zone: UTC+5:00

Sazhino (Russian: Сажино) is a rural locality (a selo) in Dubovskoye Rural Settlement, Beryozovsky District, Perm Krai, Russia. The population was 130 as of 2010. There are 3 streets.

== Geography ==
Sazhino is located 15 km west of Beryozovka (the district's administrative centre) by road. Metalnikovo is the nearest rural locality.
