= Bereznichek =

Bereznichek Березничек
- Village
- Location within Arkhangelsk Oblast Location within Russia
- Coordinates: 62°38′N 42°56′E
- Country: Russia
- Region: Arkhangelsk Oblast
- District: Vinogradovsky District
- Time zone: UTC+3:00

Bereznichek (Russian: Березничек) is a rural locality (a village) in Vinogradovsky District, Arkhangelsk Oblast, Russia. The population was 20 as of 2010. There are 2 streets.

== Geography ==
Bereznichek is located on the Vaga River, 33 km southeast of Bereznik (the district's administrative centre) by road. Vazhsky is the nearest rural locality.
