= Verkhnyaya Vayenga =

Verkhnyaya Vayenga Верхняя Ваеньга
- Village
- Location within Arkhangelsk Oblast Location within Russia
- Coordinates: 62°53′N 43°04′E
- Country: Russia
- Region: Arkhangelsk Oblast
- District: Vinogradovsky District
- Time zone: UTC+3:00

Verkhnyaya Vayenga (Russian: Верхняя Ваеньга) is a rural locality (a village) in Osinovskoye Rural Settlement of Vinogradovsky District, Arkhangelsk Oblast, Russia. The population was 31 as of 2010. There are four streets.

== Geography ==
Verkhnyaya Vayenga is located 26 km east of Bereznik (the district's administrative centre) by road. Kvakhtyuga is the nearest rural locality.
