= Plotnikovo =

Plotnikovo Плотниково
- Village
- Location within Perm Krai Location within Russia
- Coordinates: 57°26′N 57°33′E
- Country: Russia
- Region: Perm Krai
- District: Beryozovsky District
- Time zone: UTC+5:00

Plotnikovo (Russian: Плотниково) is a rural locality (a village) in Asovskoye Rural Settlement, Beryozovsky District, Perm Krai, Russia. The population was 137 as of 2010.

== Geography ==
Plotnikovo is located on the Sosnovka River, 33 km southeast of the district's administrative centre, Beryozovka, by road. Sosnovka is the nearest rural locality.
