= Taz Tatarsky =

Taz Tatarsky Таз Татарский
- Village
- Location within Perm Krai Location within Russia
- Coordinates: 57°32′N 57°23′E
- Country: Russia
- Region: Perm Krai
- District: Beryozovsky District
- Time zone: UTC+5:00

Taz Tatarsky (Russian: Таз Татарский) is a rural locality (a village) in Klyapovskoye Rural Settlement, Beryozovsky District, Perm Krai, Russia. The population is 174 as of 2010.

== Geography ==
Taz Tatarsky is located on the Taz River, 11 km southeast of Beryozovka (the district's administrative centre) by road. Taz Russky is the nearest rural locality.
