= Klychi =

Klychi Клычи
- Village
- Location within Perm Krai Location within Russia
- Coordinates: 57°34′N 57°15′E
- Country: Russia
- Region: Perm Krai
- District: Beryozovsky District
- Time zone: UTC+5:00

Klychi (Russian: Клычи) is a rural locality (a village) in Zaboryinskoye Rural Settlement, Beryozovsky District, Perm Krai, Russia. The population was 180 as of 2010. There are 3 streets.

== Geography ==
It is located on the Shakva River, 5 km southwest of Beryozovka (the district's administrative centre) by road. Shumkovo is the nearest rural locality.
