= Troynichevskaya =

Troynichevskaya Тройничевская
- Village
- Location within Arkhangelsk Oblast Location within Russia
- Coordinates: 62°45′N 43°12′E
- Country: Russia
- Region: Arkhangelsk Oblast
- District: Vinogradovsky District
- Time zone: UTC+3:00

Troynichevskaya (Russian: Тройничевская) is a rural locality (a village) in Osinovskoye Rural Settlement of Vinogradovsky District, Arkhangelsk Oblast, Russia. The population was 26 as of 2010.

== Geography ==
Troynichevskaya is located 30 km southeast of Bereznik (the district's administrative centre) by road. Selivanovskaya is the nearest rural locality.
