= Shulgino =

Shulgino Шульгино
- Village
- Location within Perm Krai Location within Russia
- Coordinates: 57°30′N 57°34′E
- Country: Russia
- Region: Perm Krai
- District: Beryozovsky District
- Time zone: UTC+5:00

Shulgino (Russian: Шульгино) is a rural locality (a village) in Asovskoye Rural Settlement, Beryozovsky District, Perm Krai, Russia. The population was 65 as of 2010. There are streets.

== Geography ==
Shulgino is located 23 km southeast of Beryozovka, the district's administrative centre, by road. Boronduki is the nearest rural locality.
