= Monastyryok =

Monastyryok Монастырёк
- Village
- Location within Arkhangelsk Oblast Location within Russia
- Coordinates: 63°04′N 42°04′E
- Country: Russia
- Region: Arkhangelsk Oblast
- District: Vinogradovsky District
- Time zone: UTC+3:00

Monastyryok (Russian: Монастырёк) is a rural locality (a village) in Morzhegorskoye Rural Settlement of Vinogradovsky District, Arkhangelsk Oblast, Russia. The population was 2 as of 2010.

== Geography ==
Monastyryok is located on the Severnaya Dvina River, 49 km northwest of Bereznik (the district's administrative centre) by road. Khokhnovskaya is the nearest rural locality.
