= Nizhniye Isady =

Nizhniye Isady Нижние Исады
- Village
- Location within Perm Krai Location within Russia
- Coordinates: 57°43′N 57°37′E
- Country: Russia
- Region: Perm Krai
- District: Beryozovsky District
- Time zone: UTC+5:00

Nizhniye Isady (Russian: Нижние Исады) is a rural locality (a village) in Beryozovsky District, Perm Krai, Russia. The population was 42 as of 2010.

== Geography ==
Nizhniye Isady is located 26 km northeast of Beryozovka (the district's administrative centre) by road. Verkhniye Isady is the nearest rural locality.
