= Martely, Beryozovsky District, Perm Krai =

Martely Мартелы
- Village
- Location within Perm Krai Location within Russia
- Coordinates: 57°42′N 57°27′E
- Country: Russia
- Region: Perm Krai
- District: Beryozovsky District
- Time zone: UTC+5:00

Martely (Russian: Мартелы) is a rural locality (a village) in Beryozovsky District, Perm Krai, Russia. The population was 51 as of 2010.

== Geography ==
Martely is located 17 km northeast of Beryozovka (the district's administrative centre) by road. Potanitsy is the nearest rural locality.
