= Palnik =

Palnik Пальник
- Village
- Location within Perm Krai Location within Russia
- Coordinates: 57°45′N 57°12′E
- Country: Russia
- Region: Perm Krai
- District: Beryozovsky District
- Time zone: UTC+5:00

Palnik (Russian: Пальник) is a rural locality (a village) in Pereborskoye Rural Settlement, Beryozovsky District, Perm Krai, Russia. The population was 3 as of 2010.

== Geography ==
Palnik is located 33 km north of Beryozovka (the district's administrative centre) by road. Pozdyanka is the nearest rural locality.
