= Pronosnoye =

Pronosnoye Проносное
- Village
- Location within Perm Krai Location within Russia
- Coordinates: 57°29′N 57°34′E
- Country: Russia
- Region: Perm Krai
- District: Beryozovsky District
- Time zone: UTC+5:00

Pronosnoye (Russian: Проносное) is a rural locality (a village) in Asovskoye Rural Settlement, Beryozovsky District, Perm Krai, Russia. The population was 319 as of 2010. There are 4 streets.

== Geography ==
Pronosnoye is located 27 km southeast of Beryozovka (the district's administrative centre) by road. Vilisovo is the nearest rural locality.
