= Fillipovskaya =

Fillipovskaya Филипповская
- Village
- Location within Arkhangelsk Oblast Location within Russia
- Coordinates: 62°42′N 43°18′E
- Country: Russia
- Region: Arkhangelsk Oblast
- District: Vinogradovsky District
- Time zone: UTC+3:00

Fillipovskaya (Russian: Филипповская) is a rural locality (a village) in Vinogradovsky District, Arkhangelsk Oblast, Russia. The population was 5 as of 2012.

== Geography ==
Fillipovskaya is located on the Severnaya Dvina River, 38 km southeast of Bereznik (the district's administrative centre) by road. Sidorovskaya is the nearest rural locality.
