= Bateriki =

Bateriki Батерики
- Village
- Location within Perm Krai Location within Russia
- Coordinates: 57°45′N 57°15′E
- Country: Russia
- Region: Perm Krai
- District: Beryozovsky District
- Time zone: UTC+5:00

Bateriki (Russian: Батерики) is a rural locality (a village) in Pereborskoye Rural Settlement, Beryozovsky District, Perm Krai, Russia. The population was 212 as of 2010. There are 7 streets.

== Geography ==
Bateriki is located on the Shakva River, 29 km north of Beryozovka (the district's administrative centre) by road. Pozdino is the nearest rural locality.
