= Vysokusha =

Vysokusha Высокуша
- Village
- Location within Arkhangelsk Oblast Location within Russia
- Coordinates: 62°58′N 42°39′E
- Country: Russia
- Region: Arkhangelsk Oblast
- District: Vinogradovsky District
- Time zone: UTC+3:00

Vysokusha (Russian: Высокуша) is a rural locality (a village) in Ust-Vayengskoye Rural Settlement of Vinogradovsky District, Arkhangelsk Oblast, Russia. The population was 10 as of 2010.

== Geography ==
Vysokusha is located 19 km north of Bereznik (the district's administrative centre) by road. Goltsovo is the nearest rural locality.
