= Bartovo =

Bartovo Бартово
- Village
- Location within Perm Krai Location within Russia
- Coordinates: 57°39′N 57°04′E
- Country: Russia
- Region: Perm Krai
- District: Beryozovsky District
- Time zone: UTC+5:00

Bartovo (Russian: Бартово) is a rural locality (a village) in Dubovskoye Rural Settlement, Beryozovsky District, Perm Krai, Russia. The population was 37 as of 2010.

== Geography ==
Bartovo is located 19 km northwest of Beryozovka (the district's administrative centre) by road. Fedotovo is the nearest rural locality.
