= Pentyurino =

Pentyurino Пентюрино
- Village
- Location within Perm Krai Location within Russia
- Coordinates: 57°37′N 57°17′E
- Country: Russia
- Region: Perm Krai
- District: Beryozovsky District
- Time zone: UTC+5:00

Pentyurino (Russian: Пентюрино) is a rural locality (a village) in Beryozovskoye Rural Settlement, Beryozovsky District, Perm Krai, Russia. The population was 145 as of 2010.

== Geography ==
It is located on the Shakva River, 3 km north of Beryozovka (the district's administrative centre) by road. Shishkino is the nearest rural locality.
