= Zernino =

Zernino Зернино
- Selo
- Location within Perm Krai Location within Russia
- Coordinates: 57°37′N 57°39′E
- Country: Russia
- Region: Perm Krai
- District: Beryozovsky District
- Time zone: UTC+5:00

Zernino (Russian: Зернино) is a rural locality (a selo) in Klyapovskoye Rural Settlement, Beryozovsky District, Perm Krai, Russia. The population was 315 as of 2010. There are 5 streets.

== Geography ==
Zernino is located on the Barda River, 27 km east of Beryozovka (the district's administrative centre) by road. Malyshi is the nearest rural locality.
