= Perebor =

Perebor Перебор
- Village
- Location within Perm Krai Location within Russia
- Coordinates: 57°42′N 57°19′E
- Country: Russia
- Region: Perm Krai
- District: Beryozovsky District
- Time zone: UTC+5:00

Perebor (Russian: Перебор) is a rural locality (a village) and the administrative center of Pereborskoye Rural Settlement, Beryozovsky District, Perm Krai, Russia. The population was 516 as of 2010. There are 11 streets.

== Geography ==
Perebor is located on the Shakva River, 19 km north of Beryozovka (the district's administrative centre) by road. Podperebor is the nearest rural locality.
