= Tuyasy =

Tuyasy Туясы
- Village
- Location within Perm Krai Location within Russia
- Coordinates: 57°38′N 57°28′E
- Country: Russia
- Region: Perm Krai
- District: Beryozovsky District
- Time zone: UTC+5:00

Tuyasy (Russian: Туясы) is a rural locality (a village) in Beryozovsky District, Perm Krai, Russia. The population was 171 as of 2010. There are 3 streets.

== Geography ==
Tuyasy is located 19 km northeast of Beryozovka (the district's administrative centre) by road. Puzdrino is the nearest rural locality.
