= Pechatka =

Pechatka Печатка
- Village
- Location within Perm Krai Location within Russia
- Coordinates: 57°40′N 57°31′E
- Country: Russia
- Region: Perm Krai
- District: Beryozovsky District
- Time zone: UTC+5:00

Pechatka (Russian: Печатка) is a rural locality (a village) in Beryozovsky District, Perm Krai, Russia. The population was 15 as of 2010.

== Geography ==
Pechatka is located 19 km northeast of Beryozovka (the district's administrative centre) by road. Sosnovka is the nearest rural locality.
