= Yepishata =

Yepishata Епишата
- Village
- Location within Perm Krai Location within Russia
- Coordinates: 57°35′N 57°38′E
- Country: Russia
- Region: Perm Krai
- District: Beryozovsky District
- Time zone: UTC+5:00

Yepishata (Russian: Епишата) is a rural locality (a village) in Klyapovskoye Rural Settlement, Beryozovsky District, Perm Krai, Russia. The population was 33 as of 2010.

== Geography ==
Yepishata is located on the Barda River, 26 km east of Beryozovka (the district's administrative centre) by road. Demidyata is the nearest rural locality.
