= Tokmany =

Tokmany Токманы
- Village
- Location within Perm Krai Location within Russia
- Coordinates: 57°33′N 57°38′E
- Country: Russia
- Region: Perm Krai
- District: Beryozovsky District
- Time zone: UTC+5:00

Tokmany (Russian: Токманы) is a rural locality (a village) in Asovskoye Rural Settlement, Beryozovsky District, Perm Krai, Russia. The population was 2 as of 2010. There are 3 streets.

== Geography ==
Tokmany is located on the Barda River, 32 km southeast of Beryozovka (the district's administrative centre) by road. Yepishata is the nearest rural locality.
