= Zaborye, Vinogradovsky District, Arkhangelsk Oblast =

Zaborye Заборье
- Village
- Location within Arkhangelsk Oblast Location within Russia
- Coordinates: 62°44′N 42°51′E
- Country: Russia
- Region: Arkhangelsk Oblast
- District: Vinogradovsky District
- Time zone: UTC+3:00

Zaborye (Russian: Заборье) is a rural locality (a village) in Shidrovskoye Rural Settlement of Vinogradovsky District, Arkhangelsk Oblast, Russia. The population was 52 as of 2010.

== Geography ==
Zaborye is located on the Vaga River, 54 km southeast of Bereznik (the district's administrative centre) by road. Ust-Vaga is the nearest rural locality.
