= Shidrovo (settlement) =

Shidrovo Шидрово
- Settlement
- Location within Arkhangelsk Oblast Location within Russia
- Coordinates: 62°47′N 42°52′E
- Country: Russia
- Region: Arkhangelsk Oblast
- District: Vinogradovsky District
- Time zone: UTC+3:00

Shidrovo (Russian: Шидрово) is a rural locality (a settlement) and the administrative center of Shidrovskoye Rural Settlement of Vinogradovsky District, Arkhangelsk Oblast, Russia. The population was 493 as of 2010. There are 7 streets.

== Geography ==
Shidrovo is located on the Vaga River, 49 km southeast of Bereznik (the district's administrative centre) by road. Shidrovo (village) is the nearest rural locality.
