= Gridinskaya, Vinogradovsky District, Arkhangelsk Oblast =

Gridinskaya Гридинская
- Village
- Location within Arkhangelsk Oblast Location within Russia
- Coordinates: 62°28′N 43°56′E
- Country: Russia
- Region: Arkhangelsk Oblast
- District: Vinogradovsky District
- Time zone: UTC+3:00

Gridinskaya (Russian: Гридинская) is a rural locality (a village) in Boretskoye Rural Settlement of Vinogradovsky District, Arkhangelsk Oblast, Russia. The population was 174 as of 2010. There is 1 street.

== Geography ==
Gridinskaya is located on the Tyoda River, 83 km southeast of Bereznik (the district's administrative centre) by road. Zadorikha is the nearest rural locality.
