= Vinogradovsky =

Vinogradovsky (masculine), Vinogradovskaya (feminine), or Vinogradovskoye (neuter) may refer to:

- Vinogradovsky District, a district of Arkhangelsk Oblast, Russia
- Vinogradovsky (rural locality), a rural locality (a khutor) in Rostov Oblast, Russia
