= Seltso, Arkhangelsk Oblast =

Seltso Сельцо
- Village
- Location within Arkhangelsk Oblast Location within Russia
- Coordinates: 62°29′N 43°46′E
- Country: Russia
- Region: Arkhangelsk Oblast
- District: Vinogradovsky District
- Time zone: UTC+3:00

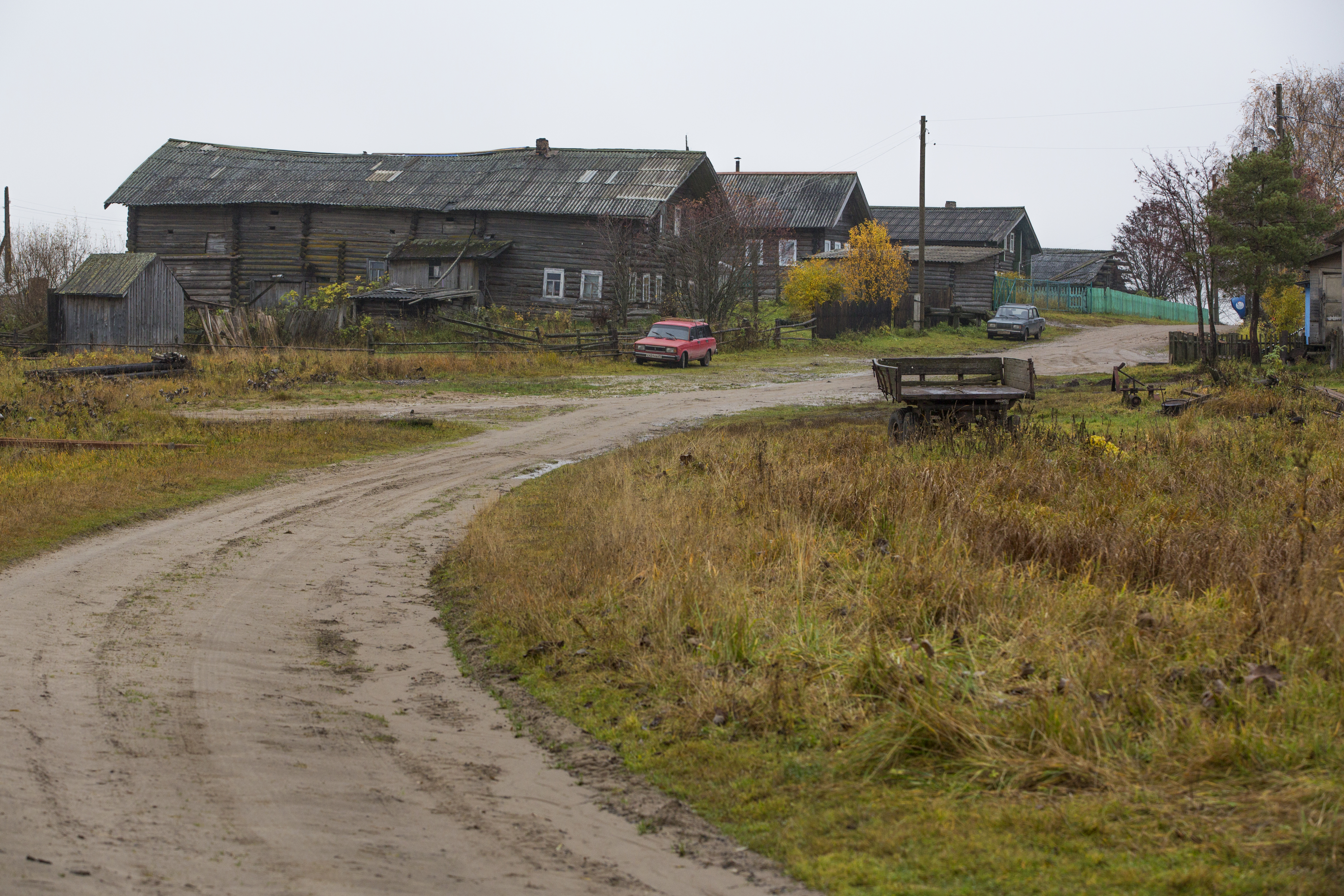
Development complex in Seltso village, Vinogradovsky district, Arkhangelsk region

Seltso (Russian: Сельцо) is a rural locality (a village) in Vinogradovsky District, Arkhangelsk Oblast, Russia. The population was 32 as of 2010.

== Geography ==
Seltso is located on the Severnaya Dvina River, 84 km southeast of Bereznik (the district's administrative centre) by road. Kovernikovskaya is the nearest rural locality.
