= Malaya Sosnovka =

Malaya Sosnovka Малая Сосновка
- Village
- Location within Perm Krai Location within Russia
- Coordinates: 57°39′N 57°28′E
- Country: Russia
- Region: Perm Krai
- District: Beryozovsky District
- Time zone: UTC+5:00

Malaya Sosnovka (Russian: Малая Сосновка) is a rural locality (a village) in Beryozovsky District, Perm Krai, Russia. The population was 35 as of 2010.
