= Zaborye, Beryozovsky District, Perm Krai =

Zaborye Заборье
- Village
- Location within Perm Krai Location within Russia
- Coordinates: 57°32′N 57°14′E
- Country: Russia
- Region: Perm Krai
- District: Beryozovsky District
- Time zone: UTC+5:00

Zaborye (Russian: Заборье) is a rural locality (a village) and the administrative center of Zaboryinskoye Rural Settlement, Beryozovsky District, Perm Krai, Russia. The population was 522 as of 2010. There are 4 streets.

== Geography ==
Zaborye is located 10 km southwest of Beryozovka (the district's administrative centre) by road. Karnaukhovo is the nearest rural locality.
