= Yakovlevskaya, Vinogradovsky District, Arkhangelsk Oblast =

Yakovlevskaya Яковлевская
- Village
- Location within Arkhangelsk Oblast Location within Russia
- Coordinates: 62°31′N 43°39′E
- Country: Russia
- Region: Arkhangelsk Oblast
- District: Vinogradovsky District
- Time zone: UTC+3:00

Yakovlevskaya (Russian: Яковлевская) is a rural locality (a village) and the administrative center of Zaostrovskoye Rural Settlement of Vinogradovsky District, Arkhangelsk Oblast, Russia. The population was 310 as of 2010. There are 3 streets.

== Geography ==
Yakovlevskaya is located on the Nyuma River, 75 km southeast of Bereznik (the district's administrative centre) by road. Zherlyginskaya is the nearest rural locality.
