= Osinovo, Perm Krai =

Osinovo Осиново
- Village
- Location within Perm Krai Location within Russia
- Coordinates: 57°33′N 57°24′E
- Country: Russia
- Region: Perm Krai
- District: Beryozovsky District
- Time zone: UTC+5:00

Osinovo (Russian: Осиново) is a rural locality (a village) in Klyapovskoye Rural Settlement, Beryozovsky District, Perm Krai, Russia. The population was 20 as of 2010. There are 2 streets.

== Geography ==
Osinovo is located on the Taz River, 9 km southeast of Beryozovka (the district's administrative centre) by road. Borodino is the nearest rural locality.
