= Karnaukhovo, Zaboryinskoye Rural Settlement =

Karnaukhovo Карнаухово
- Selo
- Location within Perm Krai Location within Russia
- Coordinates: 57°32′N 57°11′E
- Country: Russia
- Region: Perm Krai
- District: Beryozovsky District
- Time zone: UTC+5:00

Karnaukhovo (Russian: Карнаухово) is a rural locality (a selo) in Zaboryinskoye Rural Settlement, Beryozovsky District, Perm Krai, Russia. The population was 165 as of 2010. There are 3 streets.

== Geography ==
Karnaukhovo is located 13 km southwest of Beryozovka (the district's administrative centre) by road. Issinyayevo is the nearest rural locality.
