= Vilisovo =

Vilisovo Вилисово
- Village
- Location within Perm Krai Location within Russia
- Coordinates: 57°29′N 57°33′E
- Country: Russia
- Region: Perm Krai
- District: Beryozovsky District
- Time zone: UTC+5:00

Vilisovo (Russian: Вилисово) is a rural locality (a village) in Asovskoye Rural Settlement, Beryozovsky District, Perm Krai, Russia. The population was 38 as of 2010.

== Geography ==
Vilisovo is located on the Barda River, 29 km southeast of Beryozovka (the district's administrative centre) by road. Pronosnoye is the nearest rural locality.
