= Shestaki =

Shestaki (Russian: Шестаки) is the name of several rural localities in Russia:

- Shestaki, Beryozovsky District, Perm Krai, a village in Beryozovsky District, Perm Krai
- Shestaki, Gubakhinsky Urban okrug, a settlement in Gubakhinsky Urban okrug
