= Fedotovo, Beryozovsky District, Perm Krai =

Fedotovo Федотово
- Village
- Location within Perm Krai Location within Russia
- Coordinates: 57°39′N 57°09′E
- Country: Russia
- Region: Perm Krai
- District: Beryozovsky District
- Time zone: UTC+5:00

Fedotovo (Russian: Федотово) is a rural locality (a village) in Dubovskoye Rural Settlement, Beryozovsky District, Perm Krai, Russia. The population was 35 as of 2010.

== Geography ==
Fedotovo is located 13 km northwest of Beryozovka, the district's administrative centre, by road. Dubovoye is the nearest rural locality.
