= Shestaki, Beryozovsky District, Perm Krai =

Shestaki Шестаки
- Village
- Location within Perm Krai Location within Russia
- Coordinates: 57°32′N 57°46′E
- Country: Russia
- Region: Perm Krai
- District: Beryozovsky District
- Time zone: UTC+5:00

Shestaki (Russian: Шестаки) is a rural locality (a village) in Asovskoye Rural Settlement, Beryozovsky District, Perm Krai, Russia. The population was 25 as of 2010. There is 1 street.

== Geography ==
Shestaki is located on the Asovka River, 34 km southeast of Beryozovka, the district's administrative centre, by road. Podvoloshino is the nearest rural locality.
