= Shidrovo (village) =

Shidrovo Шидрово
- Village
- Location within Arkhangelsk Oblast Location within Russia
- Coordinates: 62°46′N 42°52′E
- Country: Russia
- Region: Arkhangelsk Oblast
- District: Vinogradovsky District
- Time zone: UTC+3:00

Shidrovo (Russian: Шидрово) is a rural locality (a village) in Shidrovskoye Rural Settlement of Vinogradovsky District, Arkhangelsk Oblast, Russia. The population was 63 as of 2010.

== Geography ==
Shidrovo is located on the Vaga River, 50 km southeast of Bereznik (the district's administrative centre) by road. Shidrovo (settlement) is the nearest rural locality.
