= Rochegda =

Rochegda Рочегда
- Settlement
- Location within Arkhangelsk Oblast Location within Russia
- Coordinates: 62°40′N 43°24′E
- Country: Russia
- Region: Arkhangelsk Oblast
- District: Vinogradovsky District
- Time zone: UTC+3:00

Rochegda (Russian: Рочегда) is a rural locality (a settlement) and the administrative center of Rochegodskoye Rural Settlement of Vinogradovsky District, Arkhangelsk Oblast, Russia. The population was 1989 as of 2010. There are 21 streets.

in 1996 a memorial was erected outside the village in the camp cemetery of Kuloilag, which existed for two years nearby.

== Geography ==
Rochegda is located 45 km southeast of Bereznik (the district's administrative centre) by road. Pleso is the nearest rural locality.
