= Vayenga (Barents Sea) =

Location
- Country: Russia

Physical characteristics
- Mouth: Barents Sea
  - location: Kola Bay
  - coordinates: 69°04′58″N 33°28′07″E
- Length: 25 km (16 mi)

The Vayenga (Russian: Ваенга) is a river in Murmansk Oblast, Russia that flows into the Vayenga Bay (Russian: Губа Ваенга) of the Kola Bay, Barents Sea. It is 25 kilometres (16 mi) long.

The town of Severomorsk (formerly Vayenga) is located by the Vayenga Bay.
