= Fedotovo, Sobinsky District, Vladimir Oblast =

Fedotovo Федотово
- Village
- Location within Vladimir Oblast Location within Russia
- Coordinates: 55°54′N 39°52′E
- Country: Russia
- Region: Vladimir Oblast
- District: Sobinsky District
- Time zone: UTC+3:00

Fedotovo (Russian: Федотово) is a rural locality (a village) in Kopninskoye Rural Settlement, Sobinsky District, Vladimir Oblast, Russia. The population was 15 as of 2010.

== Geography ==
Fedotovo is located 26 km southwest of Sobinka (the district's administrative centre) by road. Kopnino is the nearest rural locality.
