= Fedotovo, Totemsky District, Vologda Oblast =

Fedotovo Федотово
- Village
- Location within Vologda Oblast Location within Russia
- Coordinates: 60°06′N 42°48′E
- Country: Russia
- Region: Vologda Oblast
- District: Totemsky District
- Time zone: UTC+3:00

Fedotovo (Russian: Федотово) is a rural locality (a village) in Pyatovskoye Rural Settlement, Totemsky District, Vologda Oblast, Russia. The population was 22 as of 2002.

== Geography ==
Fedotovo is located 16 km north of Totma (the district's administrative centre) by road. Kuzemkino is the nearest rural locality.
