= Fedotovo, Gus-Khrustalny District, Vladimir Oblast =

Fedotovo Федотово
- Village
- Location within Vladimir Oblast Location within Russia
- Coordinates: 55°40′N 40°55′E
- Country: Russia
- Region: Vladimir Oblast
- District: Gus-Khrustalny District
- Time zone: UTC+3:00

Fedotovo (Russian: Федотово) is a rural locality (a village) in Posyolok Anopino, Gus-Khrustalny District, Vladimir Oblast, Russia. The population was 59 as of 2010.

== Geography ==
Fedotovo is located 21 km east of Gus-Khrustalny (the district's administrative centre) by road. Vyoshki is the nearest rural locality.
