= Gridinskaya, Velsky District, Arkhangelsk Oblast =

Gridinskaya Гридинская
- Village
- Location within Arkhangelsk Oblast Location within Russia
- Coordinates: 61°18′N 41°31′E
- Country: Russia
- Region: Arkhangelsk Oblast
- District: Velsky District
- Time zone: UTC+3:00

Gridinskaya (Russian: Гридинская) is a rural locality (a village) in Khozminskoye Rural Settlement of Velsky District, Arkhangelsk Oblast, Russia. The population was 13 as of 2014.

== Geography ==
Gridinskaya is located on the Yelyuga River, 60 km northwest of Velsk (the district's administrative centre) by road. Nikolskaya is the nearest rural locality.
