= Vayenga (Northern Dvina) =

- Native name: Ваенга (Russian); Ваеньга (Russian)

Location
- Country: Russia

Physical characteristics
- Mouth: Northern Dvina
  - coordinates: 62°58′53″N 42°38′33″E
- Length: 218 km (135 mi)
- Basin size: 3,370 km^{2} (1,300 sq mi)
- Discharge
  - average: 30.4 m^{3}/s (1,070 cu ft/s)

Basin features
- Progression: Northern Dvina→ White Sea

The Northern Dvina basin (also shows the Vayenga)

The Vayenga (Russian: Ваенга, Ваеньга) is a river in Vinogradovsky District of Arkhangelsk Oblast in Russia. It is a right tributary of the Northern Dvina. The length of the river is 218 kilometres (135 mi). The area of its basin 3,370 square kilometres (1,300 sq mi). Its main tributaries are the Yugna (right) and the Nondrus (left).

The river basin of the Vayenga occupies the whole northern and central parts of Vinogradovsky District and minor parts of adjacent Kholmogorsky and Pinezhsky Districts.

The source of the Vayenga is in the center of the district, north-east of the village of Nyavody. It flows initially to the west, then turns north, and after accepting the Kisema from the right, turns north-west. After accepting from the north a right tributary, the Yugna, the Vayenga turns south-west, and eventually south and south-east. The first village in the course of the Vayenga is Vorontsy, upstream from Vorontsy the valley is not populated. South of Vorontsy the Vayenga makes a loop, accepts the Nondrus from the left, and eventually turns 180 degrees and flows north-west. Below the village of Nizhnyaya Vayenga the river turns east. The mouth of the Vayenga is located close to the village of Goltsovo, 334 kilometres (208 mi) upstream from the mouth of the Northern Dvina.

Until the 1990s, the Vayenga was used for timber rafting.
