= Vinogradovsky District =

Vinogradovsky District Виноградовский район (Russian)
- District
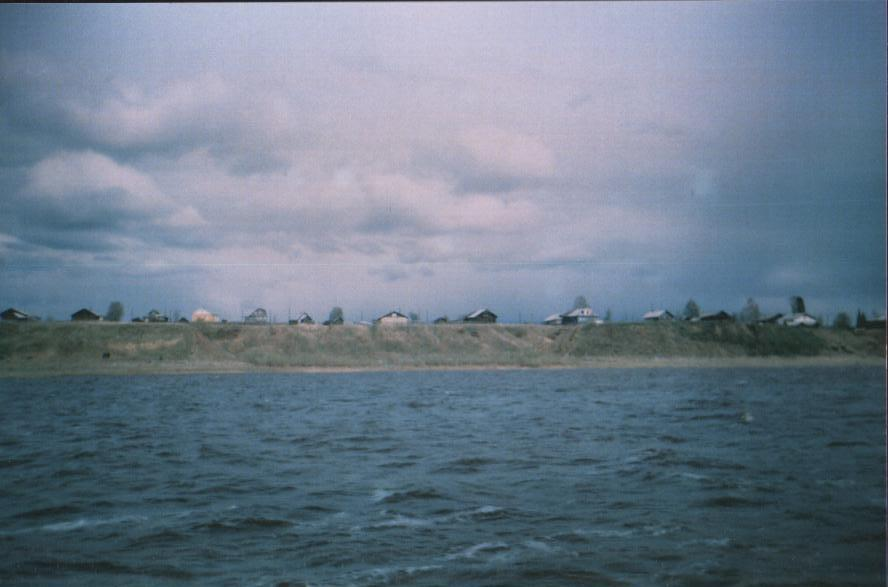
- The village of Konetsgorye in Vinogradovsky District

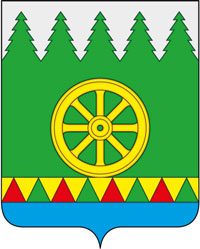
- Flag Coat of arms
- Location of Vinogradovsky District in Arkhangelsk Oblast
- Coordinates: 62°51′N 42°43′E
- Country: Russia
- Federal subject: Arkhangelsk Oblast
- Established: July 15, 1929
- Administrative center: Bereznik

Area
  - Total: 12,600 km^{2} (4,900 sq mi)

Population (2010 Census)
  - Total: 16,753
  - Density: 1.33/km^{2} (3.44/sq mi)
  - Urban: 35.9%
  - Rural: 64.1%

Administrative structure
  - Administrative divisions: 1 Urban-type settlements with jurisdictional territory, 13 Selsoviets
  - Inhabited localities: 1 urban-type settlements, 98 rural localities

Municipal structure
  - Municipally incorporated as: Vinogradovsky Municipal District
  - Municipal divisions: 1 urban settlements, 8 rural settlements
- Time zone: UTC+3 (MSK)
- OKTMO ID: 11614000

Vinogradovsky District (Russian: Виногра́довский райо́н) is an administrative district (raion), one of the twenty-one in Arkhangelsk Oblast, Russia. As a municipal division, it is incorporated as Vinogradovsky Municipal District. It is located in the center of the oblast and borders with Pinezhsky District in the northeast, Verkhnetoyemsky District in the southeast, Shenkursky District in the south, Plesetsky District in the southwest, the town of oblast significance of Mirny in the west, and with Kholmogorsky District in the northwest. The area of the district is 12,600 square kilometers (4,900 sq mi). Its administrative center is the urban locality (an urban-type settlement) of Bereznik. Population: 16,753 (2010 census); 20,862 (2002 census); 24,834 (1989 Soviet census). The population of Bereznik accounts for 35.9% of the district's total population.

== Etymology ==
The district is named after Pavlin Vinogradov, a Bolshevik and an active participant of the October Revolution and the Russian Civil War. In 1918, Vinogradov was sent to Arkhangelsk and eventually charged with the organization of the Bolshevik resistance to British and American troops. Vinogradov died in combat at the village of Shidrovo, now within the area of the district.

== History ==
The area was originally populated by speakers of Uralic languages and then colonized by the Novgorod Republic. After the fall of Novgorod, the area became a part of the Grand Duchy of Moscow. Historically, it was a part of Vazhsky Uyezd, a vast area including almost all of the river basin of the Vaga. In the course of the administrative reform carried out in 1708 by Peter the Great, the area was included into Archangelgorod Governorate. In 1780, the governorate was abolished and transformed into Vologda Viceroyalty. Vazhsky Uyezd was split, and the area of the current Vinogradovsky District became a part of the newly established Shenkursky Uyezd. In 1796, Shenkursky Uyezd was transferred to Arkhangelsk Governorate. The area was known as Podvinsky Stan.

During the Russian Civil War, battles between British and American troops and the Bolshevik troops took place on the territory of the modern district. The battles also involved the Northern Dvina Flotilla, which acted on the Northern Dvina.

Shenkursky Uyezd remained in Arkhangelsk Governorate until 1929, when several governorates were merged into Northern Krai. On July 15, 1929, the uyezds were abolished, and Shenkursky Uyezd was split into Shenkursky, Bereznikovsky, and Rovdinsky Districts. Bereznikovsky District became a part of Nyandoma Okrug of Northern Krai.

In the following years, the first-level administrative division of Russia kept changing. In 1930, the okrug was abolished, and the district was subordinated to the central administration of Northern Krai. In 1936, the krai itself was transformed into Northern Oblast. In 1937, Northern Oblast was split into Arkhangelsk Oblast and Vologda Oblast. In 1940, Bereznikovsky District was renamed Vinogradovsky District and remained in Arkhangelsk Oblast ever since.

== Geography ==
The district is located on both banks of the Northern Dvina; the left-bank part of the district is considerably smaller than the right-bank one. The whole of the district belongs to the basins of the Northern Dvina River and its major tributaries. The main tributaries of the Northern Dvina within the district are the Vaga (left) and the Vayenga (right). The eastern part of the district belongs to the basin of the Pinega via its major left tributaries, the Yula and the Pokshenga.

Almost the whole of the district is covered by coniferous forests (taiga). The exception are the meadows in the floodplains.

== Divisions ==
=== Administrative divisions ===
As an administrative division, the district is divided into thirteen selsoviets and one urban-type settlement with jurisdictional territory (Bereznik). One locality which previously had urban-type settlement status, Rochegda, was downgraded in status to that of a rural locality in 2005. The following selsoviets have been established (the administrative centers are given in parentheses):

- Boretsky (Gridinskaya)
- Kitsky (Vazhsky)
- Konetsgorsky (Konetsgorye)
- Morzhegorsky (Rodionovskaya)
- Osinovsky (Osinovo)
- Rochegodsky (Rochegda)
- Selmengsky (Selmenga)
- Shastozyorsky (Uyta)
- Shidrovsky (Shidrovo)
- Topetsky (Topsa)
- Ust-Vayengsky (Ust-Vayenga)
- Vayengsky (Vorontsy)
- Zaostrovsky (Yakovlevskaya)

=== Municipal divisions ===
As a municipal division, the district is divided into one urban settlement and eight rural settlements (the administrative centers are given in parentheses):

- Bereznikovskoye Urban Settlement (Bereznik)
- Boretskoye Rural Settlement (Selmenga)
- Kitskoye Rural Settlement (Vazhsky)
- Morzhegorskoye Rural Settlement (Khetovo)
- Osinovskoye Rural Settlement (Osinovo)
- Rochegodskoye Rural Settlement (Rochegda)
- Shidrovskoye Rural Settlement (Shidrovo)
- Ust-Vayengskoye Rural Settlement (Ust-Vayenga)
- Zaostrovskoye Rural Settlement (Yakovlevskaya)

== Economy ==
=== Industry ===
The basis of the economy of the district is timber industry, which in 2010 was responsible for 95% of the district production. Food industry, including milk production, is also developed to some extent.

=== Agriculture ===
Agriculture specializations include cattle production, as well as growing of potatoes and vegetables. Agriculture in the district suffered heavily from the economic crisis of the 1990s, from which it has not recovered.

=== Transportation ===
One of the principal highways in Russia, M8 connecting Moscow and Arkhangelsk, crosses the district from south to north.

The Northern Dvina and the Vaga are navigable within the boundaries of the district.

== Culture and recreation ==
The district contains twelve objects classified as cultural and historical heritage by the Russian Federal law, and additionally seventy-one objects classified as cultural and historical heritage of local importance. Most of these are wooden rural houses, churches, and bridges built prior to 1917.

Of the four ensembles protected at the federal level only one survives,

- Seletsky Pogost is an all-wooden ensemble of St. Iliya Church (1798), Church of the Erection of the Cross (1802–1808), and the bell-tower (1800).
- Kalezhsky Pogost was an ensemble of two wooden churches - St. Nicholas Church (1773), St. Demetrius Church (1890), as well as the wooden bell-tower (1745), in the village of Kalyi. Burned down in 2006, it no longer exists.
- Church of the Nativity of the Theotokos (1726) in the village of Yakovlevskaya. Burned down in 1989, it no longer exists.
- The ensemble of wooden St. Joachim and St. Anna Church (1726) and St. Vasily Church (1700); no longer exists.

The only museum in the district is Vinogradovsky District Museum in Bereznik, open in 1970.

In the selos of Borok and Puchuga, located along the Northern Dvina, traditional wood painting crafts developed in the 19th and 20th centuries, similar to the neighboring Nizhnyaya Toyma painting school. It is characteristic of painting in black and red colors over a yellow background. Their favorite motifs were the Sirin Bird and the black horses, symbols of a wealthy household. By the 1970s, the craft declined.
