= Bereznik, Vinogradovsky District, Arkhangelsk Oblast =

Bereznik Березник
- Settlement
- Interactive map of Bereznik
- Location of Bereznik Bereznik (Arkhangelsk Oblast)
- Coordinates: 62°51′N 42°45′E
- Country: Russia
- Federal subject: Arkhangelsk Oblast
- Administrative district: Vinogradovsky District
- Elevation: 15 m (49 ft)

Population (2010 Census)
  - Total: 6,018
  - Estimate (2021): 5,624 (−6.5%)

Municipal status
  - Municipal district: Vinogradovsky Municipal District
  - Urban settlement: =Bereznikovskoye Rural Settlement
  - Capital of: =Bereznikovskoye Rural Settlement
- Time zone: UTC+3 (MSK)
- Postal code: 164570
- OKTMO ID: 11514000101

Bereznik (Russian: Березник), also known as Dvinskoy Bereznik (Двинской Березник), is a rural locality (a settlement) and the administrative center of Vinogradovsky District of Arkhangelsk Oblast, Russia, located on the left bank of the Northern Dvina River, 192 kilometers (119 mi) southeast of Kholmogorskaya railway station and 276 kilometers (171 mi) from Arkhangelsk. Within the framework of municipal divisions, it serves as the administrative center of Bereznikovskoye Urban Settlement, the only urban settlement in the district. Population: 6,018 (2010 census); 6,464 (2002 census); 7,006 (1989 Soviet census); ~4,000 (1968).

== History ==
During the Russian Civil War, battles between British and American troops and the Bolshevik troops took place on the territory of the modern Vinogradovsky District. The battles also involved the Northern Dvina Flotilla, which acted on the Northern Dvina.

On July 15, 1929, the uyezds were abolished and Bereznikovsky District was established. It became a part of Nyandoma Okrug of Northern Krai. In 1940, Bereznikovsky District was renamed Vinogradovsky after Pavlin Vinogradov, a Bolshevik and an active participant in the October Revolution and the Russian Civil War. In 1918, Vinogradov was sent to Arkhangelsk and eventually charged with the organization of the Bolshevik resistance to British and American troops.

On 1 January 2021, Bereznik was transformed to a rural settlement. Economy-related legal and tax reasons were cited for this decision.

== Economy ==
=== Industry ===
The economy of Bereznik comprises mainly timber industry and food industry. Timber was rafted down the Northern Dvina until the 1990s but since then this practice has been abolished.

=== Transportation ===
The Northern Dvina is navigable in Bereznik.

Bereznik is located on one of the principal highways in Russia, M8 connecting Moscow and Arkhangelsk. There are regular bus connections with Arkhangelsk, Velsk, Kotlas, and Kargopol.

== Culture and recreation ==
Vinogradovsky District Museum in Bereznik, open in 1970, is the only museum in the district.
