= Beryozovka, Beryozovsky District, Perm Krai =

Beryozovka Берёзовка
- Selo
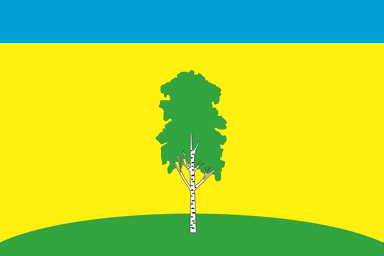
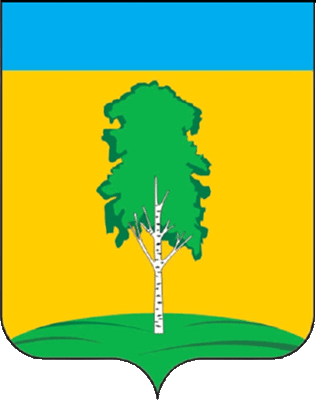
- Flag Coat of arms
- Interactive map of Beryozovka
- Location of Beryozovka Beryozovka (Perm Krai)
- Coordinates: 57°36′22″N 57°18′37″E
- Country: Russia
- Federal subject: Perm Krai
- Administrative district: Beryozovsky District

Population (2010 Census)
  - Total: 6,904
  - Estimate (2021): 6,466 (−6.3%)

Administrative status
  - Capital of: Beryozovsky District
- Time zone: UTC+5 (MSK+2)
- Postal code: 617570
- OKTMO ID: 57606404101

Beryozovka (Russian: Берёзовка) is a rural locality (a selo) and the administrative center of Beryozovsky District of Perm Krai, Russia. Population: 6,904 (2010 census); 7,062 (2002 census); 6,978 (1989 Soviet census).
