= Beryozovsky District, Perm Krai =

Beryozovsky District Берёзовский район (Russian)
- District
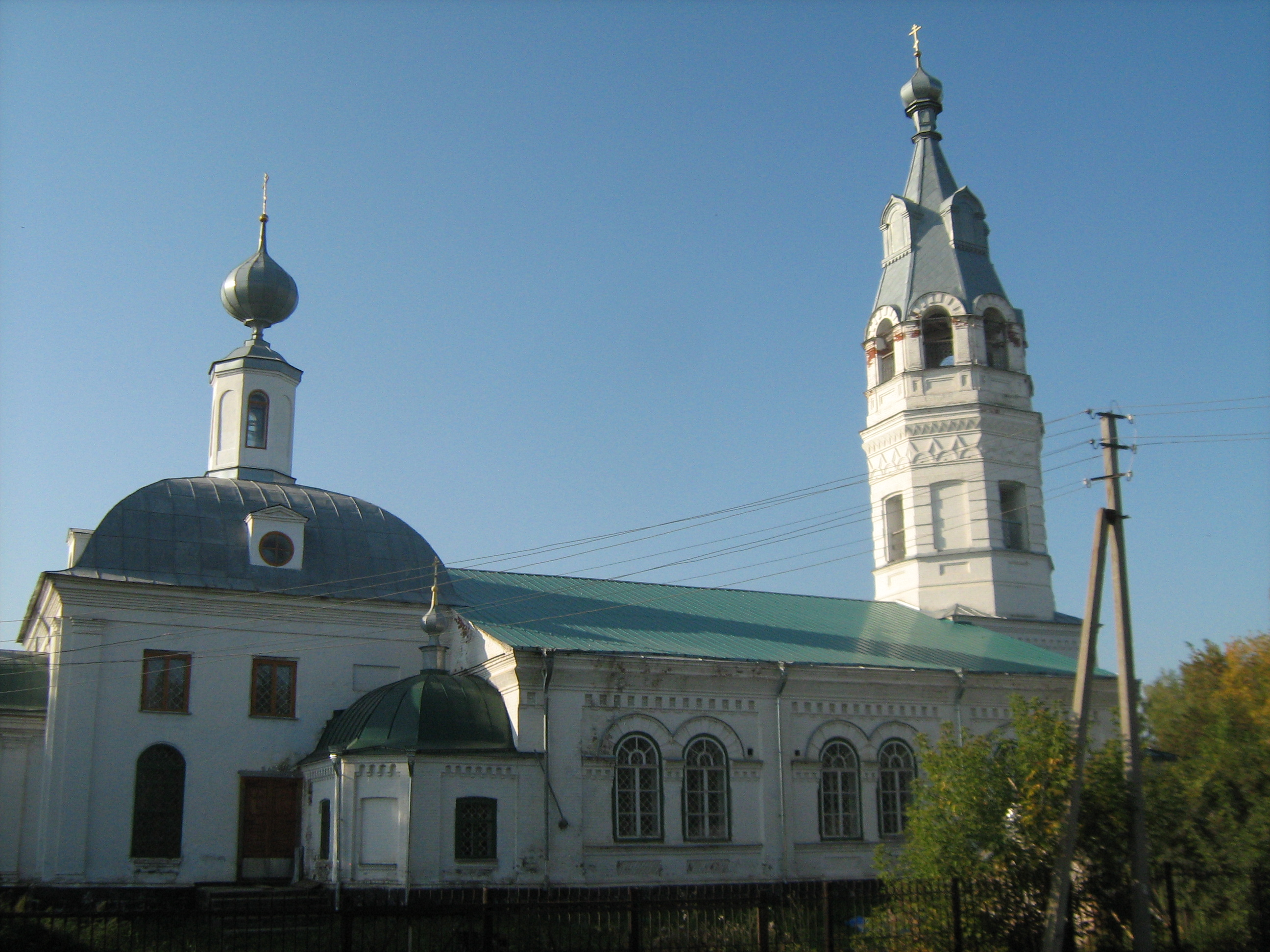
- Church of the Ascension, Beryozovsky District

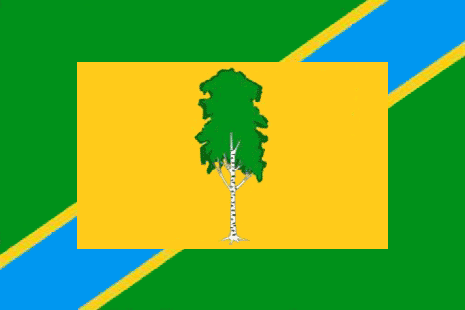
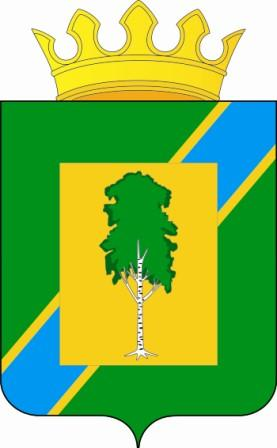
- Flag Coat of arms
- Location of Beryozovsky District in Perm Krai
- Coordinates: 57°36′22″N 57°18′37″E
- Country: Russia
- Federal subject: Perm Krai
- Established: February 27, 1924
- Administrative center: Beryozovka

Area
  - Total: 1,977 km^{2} (763 sq mi)

Population (2010 Census)
  - Total: 17,042
  - Density: 8.620/km^{2} (22.33/sq mi)
  - Urban: 0%
  - Rural: 100%

Administrative structure
  - Inhabited localities: 89 rural localities

Municipal structure
  - Municipally incorporated as: Beryozovsky Municipal District
  - Municipal divisions: 0 urban settlements, 7 rural settlements
- Time zone: UTC+5 (MSK+2)
- OKTMO ID: 57606000
- Website: http://berra.ru/

Beryozovsky District (Russian: Берёзовский райо́н) is an administrative district (raion) of Perm Krai, Russia; one of the thirty-three in the krai. Municipally, it is incorporated as Beryozovsky Municipal District. It is located in the southeast of the krai. The area of the district is 1,977 square kilometers (763 sq mi). Its administrative center is the rural locality (a selo) of Beryozovka. Population: 17,042 (2010 census); 18,516 (2002 census); 20,242 (1989 Soviet census). The population of Beryozovka accounts for 40.5% of the district's total population.

== History ==
The district was established on February 27, 1924. It was abolished between January 1, 1932 and January 25, 1935 and then again between February 1, 1963 and January 12, 1965. Since 1938, the district has been a part of Perm Oblast.

== Economy ==
District's economy is based on agriculture. Forestry, timber, and food industry are also present.

== Demographics ==
The most numerous ethnic groups, according to the 2002 Census, include Russians at 81.1% and Tatars at 16.9%.

== See also ==
- Vilisovo

== Sources ==
- Законодательное собрание Пермской области. Закон №416-67 от 28 февраля 1996 г. «Об административно-территориальном устройстве Пермского края», в ред. Закона №504-ПК от 9 июля 2015 г. «О внесении изменений в Закон Пермской области "Об административно-территориальном устройстве Пермского края"». Вступил в силу с момента опубликования. Опубликован: "Звезда", №38, 12 марта 1996 г. (Legislative Assembly of Perm Oblast. Law #416-67 of February 28, 1996 On the Administrative-Territorial Structure of Perm Krai, as amended by the Law #504-PK of July 9, 2015 On Amending the Law of Perm Oblast "On the Administrative-Territorial Structure of Perm Krai". Effective as of the moment of publication.).
- Законодательное собрание Пермской области. Закон №1872-404 от 1 декабря 2004 г. «Об утверждении границ и о наделении статусом муниципальных образований Берёзовского района Пермского края», в ред. Закона №470-ПК от 5 мая 2015 г. «О внесении изменений в отдельные Законы Пермской области, Коми-Пермяцкого автономного округа и Пермского края». Вступил в силу через десять дней со дня официального опубликования. Опубликован: "Бюллетень Законодательного Собрания и администрации Пермской области", №1, II часть, 27 января 2005 г. (Legislative Assembly of Perm Oblast. Law #1872-404 of December 1, 2004 On Establishing the Borders and on Granting the Status to the Municipal Formations of Beryozovsky District of Perm Krai, as amended by the Law #470-PK of May 5, 2015 On Amending Various Laws of Perm Oblast, Komi-Permyak Autonomous Okrug, and Perm Krai. Effective as of the day which is ten days following the day of the official publication.).
