= Lena, Russia =

Lena (Russian: Лена) is the name of several rural localities in Russia:

- Lena, Arkhangelsk Oblast, a selo in Lensky Selsoviet of Lensky District of Arkhangelsk Oblast
- Lena, Ilishevsky District, Republic of Bashkortostan, a village in Syultinsky Selsoviet of Ilishevsky District of the Republic of Bashkortostan
- Lena, Kuyurgazinsky District, Republic of Bashkortostan, a village in Taymasovsky Selsoviet of Kuyurgazinsky District of the Republic of Bashkortostan
- Lena, Chuvash Republic, a settlement in Malokarachkinskoye Rural Settlement of Yadrinsky District of the Chuvash Republic
- Lena, Kirov Oblast, a village in Ugorsky Rural Okrug of Verkhoshizhemsky District of Kirov Oblast
