= 2018–2021 Shies protests =

Environmental protests in Russia

2018-2021 Shies protests
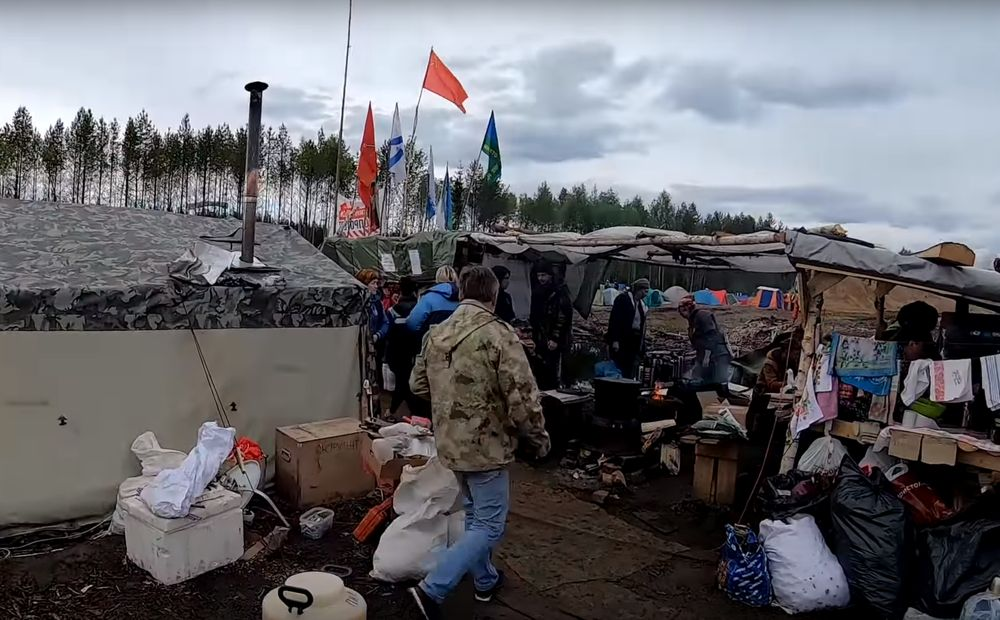
- Tent camp of activists during a protest at Shies station in the Arkhangelsk Oblast, June 2019
- Date: July 2018 – February 18, 2021
- Location: Russia: Arkhangelsk Oblast; Lensky District; Urdoma; Arkhangelsk; Severodvinsk; Kotlas; Shies station; Yarensk; Sverdlovsk Oblast; Yekaterinburg; Komi Republic; Vologda Oblast
- Goals: Termination of construction of a landfill at Shies station; Garbage reform and closure of landfills
- Methods: Protest encampment, Sit-ins, Roadblocks, Demonstrations, Internet activism
- Status: Goals achieved.: The government of the Arkhangelsk region terminated the contract with Technopark LLC.
- Concessions: Governor of the Arkhangelsk Oblast Igor Orlov and Head of the Komi Republic Sergei Gaplikov resigned

Parties
Russia; Presidential Administration; National Guard; State guards for Private security; Russian Police; Ministry of Natural resources and environment; Russian Railway Troops; Government of Arkhangelsk Oblast; Government of Lensky District; Government of Komi Republic; Government of Vologda Oblast	Protestors; Government of Urdoma; Government of Yekaterinburg; “Pomorye is not a trash heap!” movement; Pomor separatists; Libertarian Party; Republican Coalition; Navalny Headquarters; Left Front; Communist Party

Number
Unknown	30,000+ protestors

Protests against the construction of a landfill at Shies station were environmentalist protests in the Arkhangelsk Oblast, Vologda Oblast and the Komi Republic, which began in 2018 to stop the construction of a landfill and complete waste reform in Russia . The landfill was intended for storing solid household and industrial waste exported from Moscow and other regions of Russia, since its construction was planned in swampy areas and posed a danger to residents of the region, as it could lead to contamination of surface and underground water sources. The protests ultimately ended when the government accepted the demands of the protestors.

== Overview ==
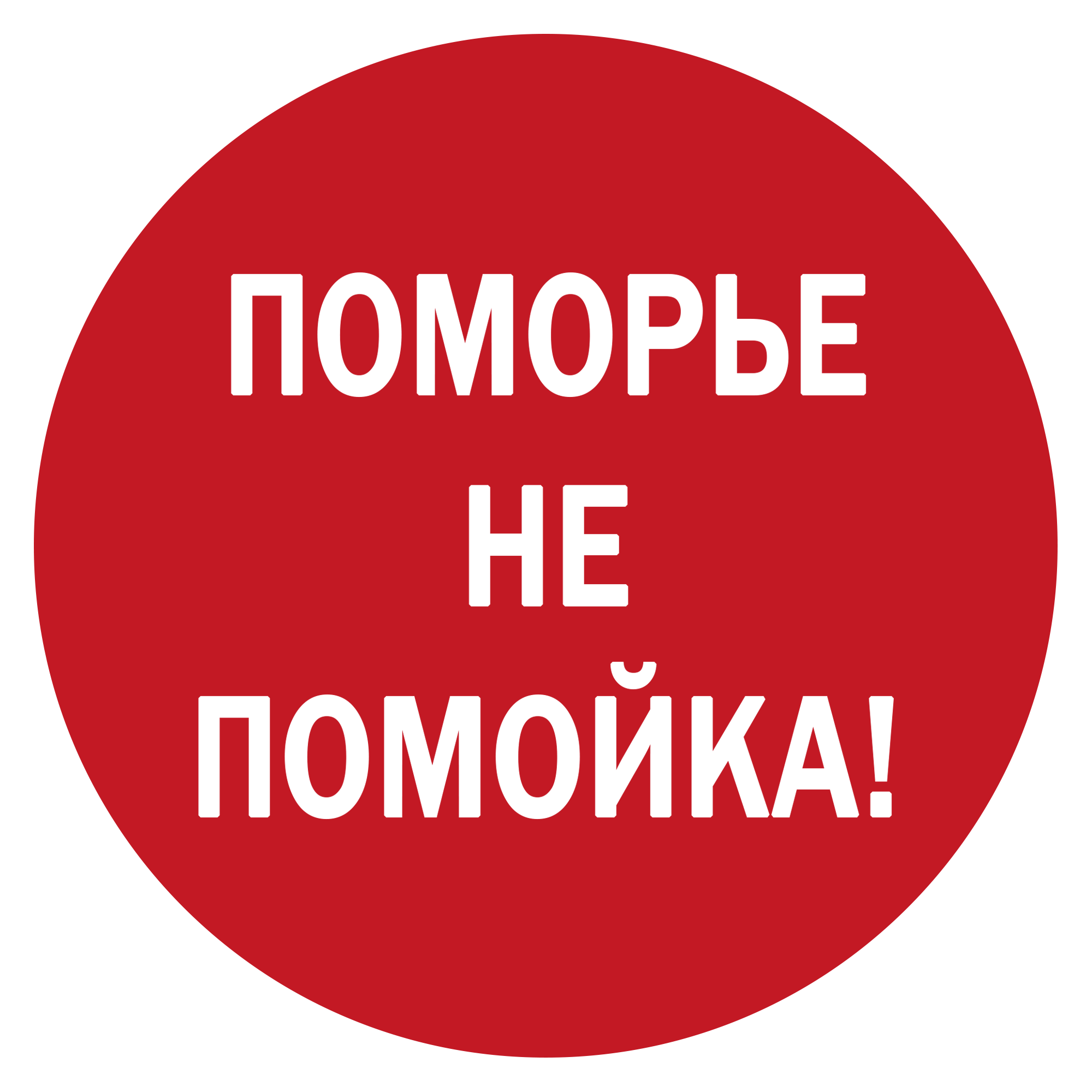
The emblem of the environmental movement “ Pomorye is not a trash heap ”, which organized protests in the Arkhangelsk Oblast

The protests started in July 2018 as an action by local residents, and by 2019 the protest had become the center of “anti-garbage” protests in Russia. In the second quarter of 2019, 34 of 56 environmental protests in the country were held in support of the Shies movement . The protests in support of the Shies movement took place in 30 regions of Russia. In the Arkhangelsk Oblast, 95% of citizens voiced against the construction of a landfill, and 25% stated that they were even ready to participate in uncoordinated protests; residents submitted over 60 thousand signatures to the presidential administration demanding that their opinion should be considered and construction should be stopped. In 2019, the protest received coverage in the international media.

In June 2019, construction of the landfill was temporarily suspended. On July 18, 2019, the European Parliament adopted a resolution demanding that Russia stop persecuting environmental activists in the Arkhangelsk Oblast. On July 20, 2019, Russian President Vladimir Putin instructed the Government of the Arkhangelsk Oblast and the Government of Moscow to ensure that the opinion of the population of the Arkhangelsk Oblast on the construction of solid municipal waste disposal facilities is considered. In December 2019, Moscow authorities prepared a territorial waste management plan, excluding the Shies landfill so as not to inflame further protests.

On July 26, 2019, Shies activists published an official appeal addressing the leaders and the governments of the Barents region states - Sweden, Norway, and Finland. The letter was sent on behalf of several public organizations, including the "Committee for the Salvation of Pechora," the "Committee for the Defense of Vychegda," the initiative group "Clean Urdma," and the "Izvata" movement. In the appeal, the activists asked for international support, pointing to the lack of response from the Russian authorities, drawing attention to numerous human rights violation and prosecution of the activists, and appealed to the successful experience of the Scandinavian countries in the field of waste processing.

According to expert Andrei Churakov, the exclusion of the facility at Shies station from the list of priority investment projects was of a formal nature. To complete the Moscow landfill project, it was necessary to exclude it from the general plan of Urdoma, into which it was included without taking into account the opinions of local residents and local authorities, and begin to restore the disturbed territory and cut down forests at the construction site. The story with Shies itself, according to Churakov, "was an attempt to bring waste from the capital’s renovation to the Shies station waste from Moscow five-story buildings, and the investment project later became only a cover for this story"

In December 2021, a crowdfunding project was launched to raise funds for the publication of a book about the protest in Shies. It will include more than 100 photographs by nine authors and memories of people who took part in the protest.

== Timeline ==
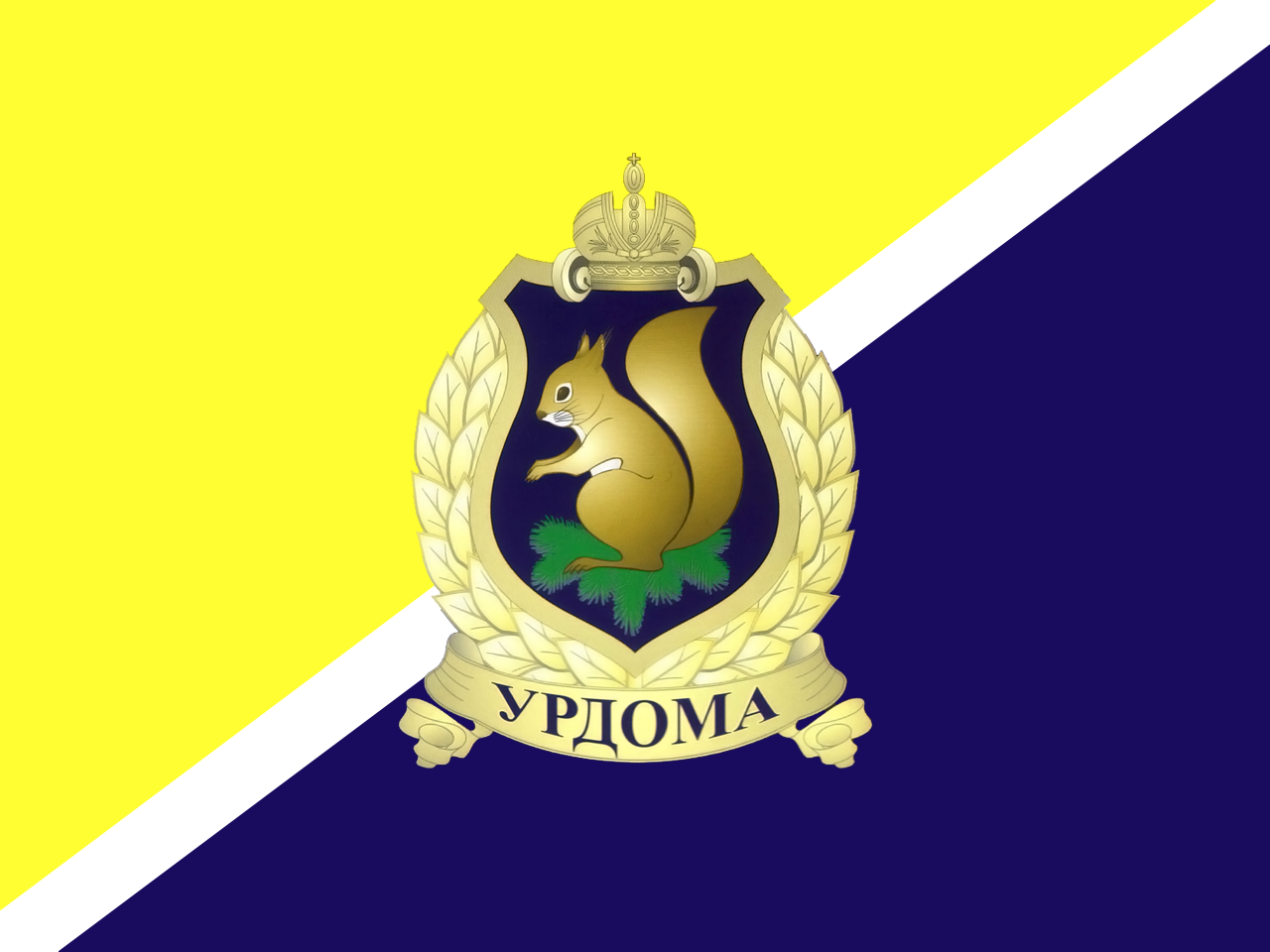
Old flag of Urdoma usually used by protestors

In 2018, construction of paved areas began on the territory of the Shies station with the help of Russian Railways . The first stage of construction began with the cutting down a hector of nearby forests.

In June of the same year, local residents accidentally discovered the construction site and equipment when two hunters accidentally came to the site. And at the end of the year, activists placed the first trailer near the construction site for round-the-clock duty, to which people came from nearby settlements and even from the entire region. Gradually, the protest camp grew and new posts appeared.

On December 2, 2018, rallies were held throughout the region, which, according to the organizers, gathered 30 thousand participants (including 5 thousand people in Arkhangelsk and 10 thousand people in Severodvinsk ). According to regional authorities, the rallies attracted 8 thousand people. Former senator from the Arkhangelsk Oblast, Konstantin Dobrynin also spoke out about the rallies: “30,000 people took to the streets of Arkhangelsk, Severodvinsk and other cities and towns in the region. That's a lot. 30,000 people for the Arkhangelsk Oblast is like 700,000 for Moscow”.

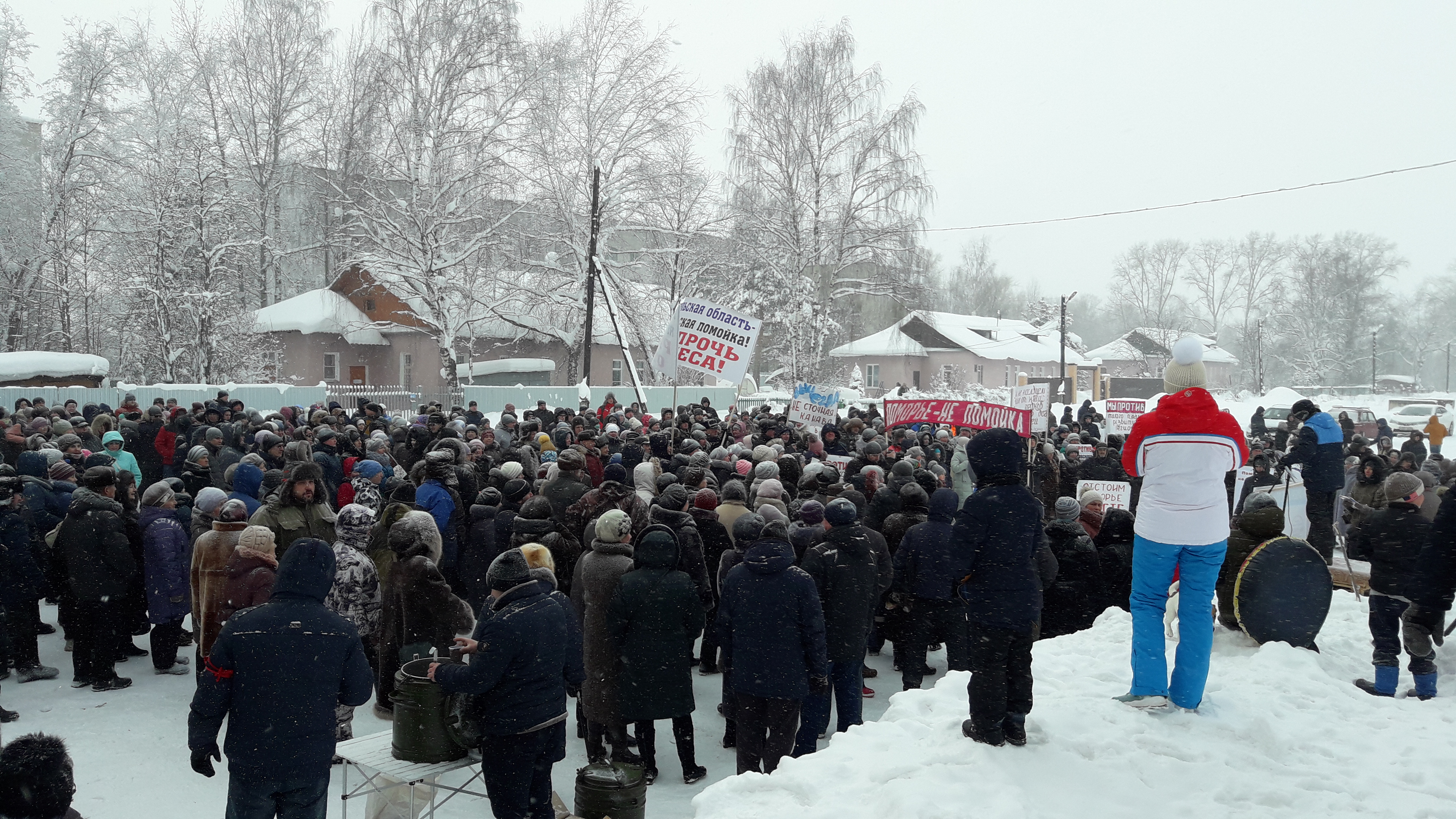
A protest against construction of Landfill in Shies

On February 3, 2019, a rally in Arkhangelsk attracted about 2 thousand people. The authorities, refused to hold the event in the city center, so the rally took place on the outskirts of the city on foot in 20-degree frost.

On February 24, a rally in Severodvinsk attracted more than 10 thousand people. A few hours before the start of the rally, volunteer Yulia Chapulina, who was counting the number of participants, was detained by the authorities.

On March 27, 2019, the Arkhangelsk Oblast Assembly of Deputies voted against holding a referendum on banning the import of garbage from other regions into the territory of the Arkhangelsk Oblast. A clash occurred between environmental activists on duty and workers from a garbage construction site. Subsequently, there were regular clashes between Shies’s defenders and employees of private security company. The activists tried to prevent the unloading of fuel and building materials, and later reported beatings and injuries.

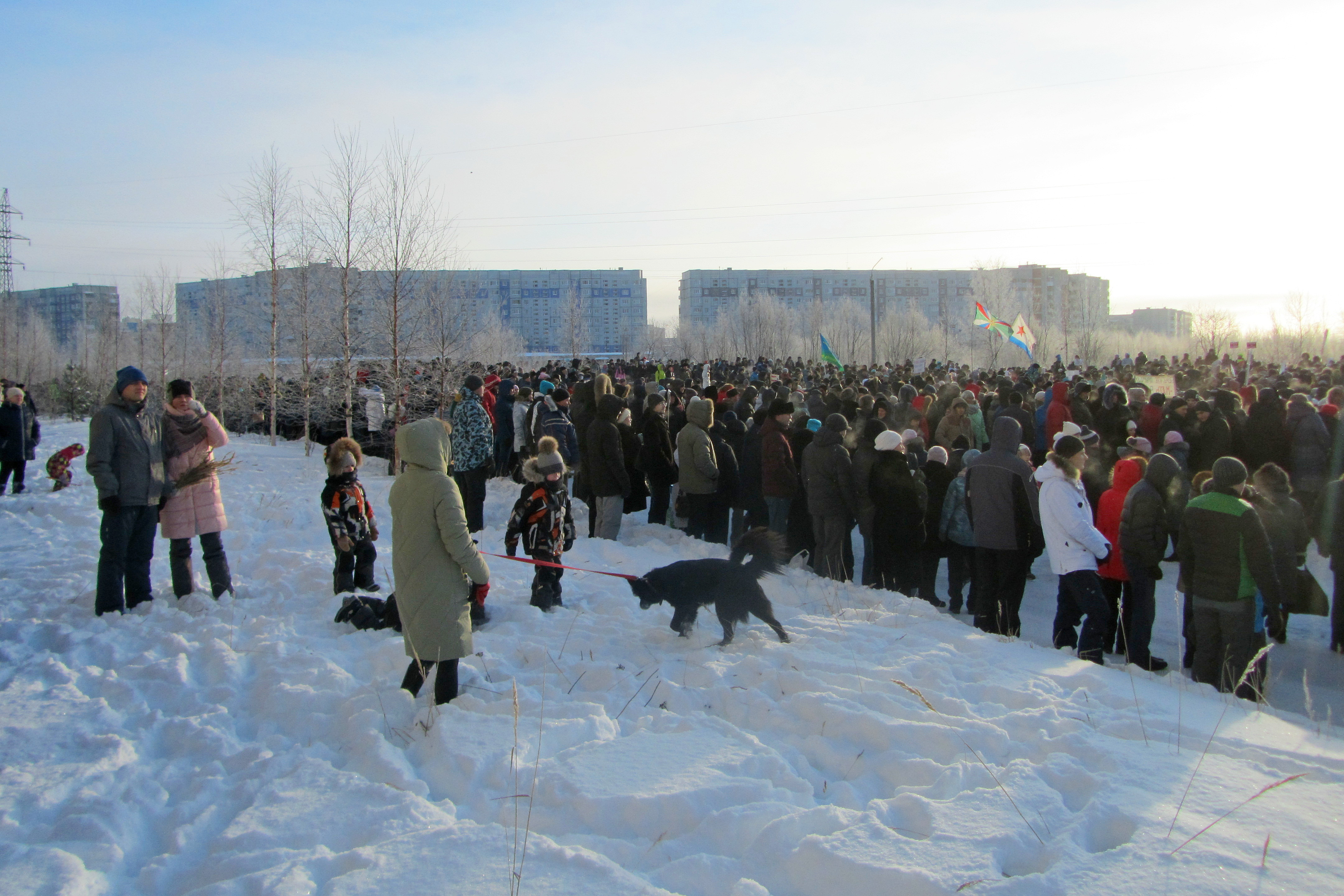
A gathering in Snow against Landfills

In April, two wooden bridges that were used to carry equipment were damaged by protestors.

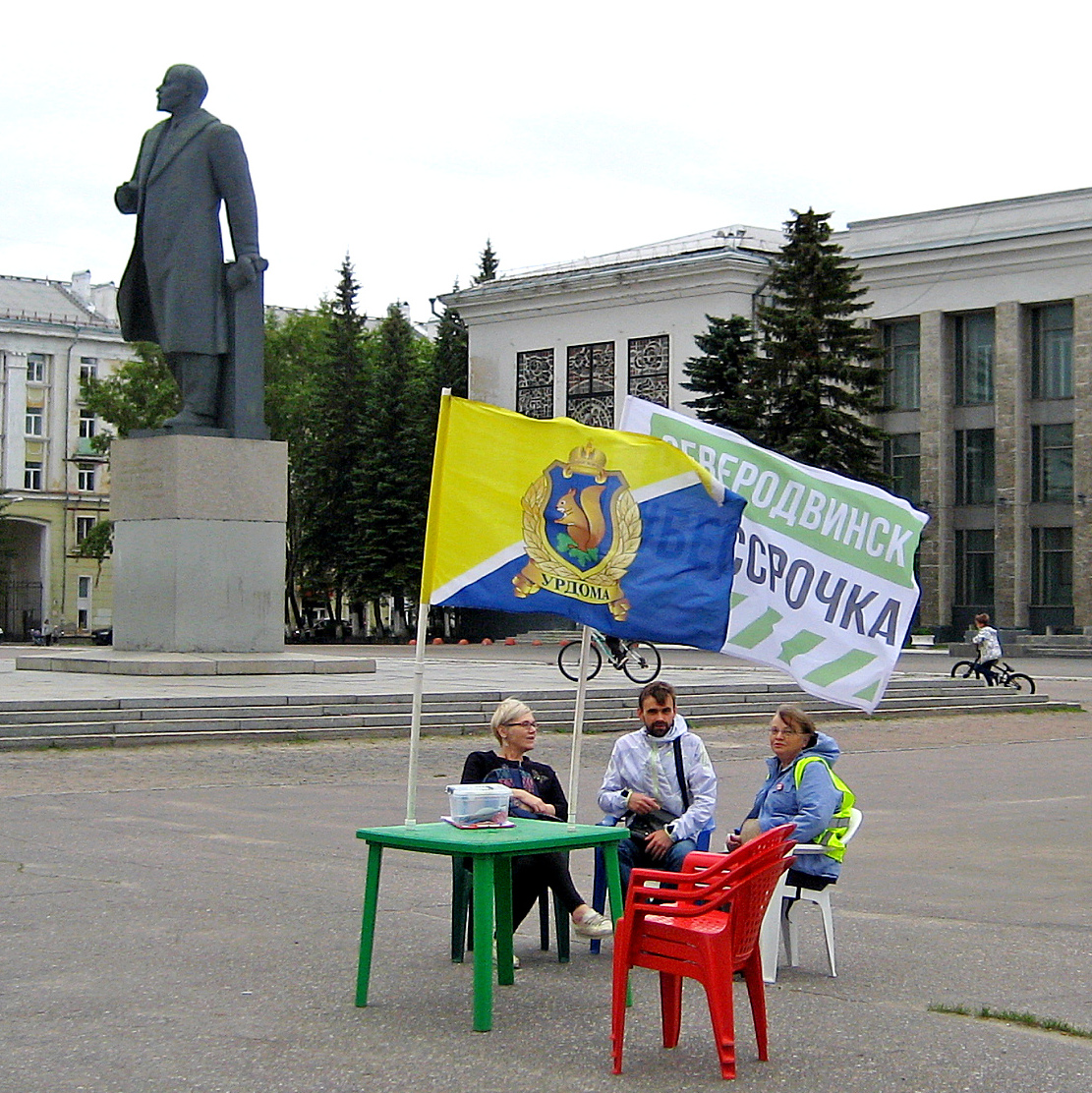
A sit-in the city centre of Arkhangelsk

On April 7, 2019, unauthorized protests took place in Arkhangelsk and the start of a sit-in was announced. The authorities detained protesters en masse.

On April 25, 2019, the Arkhangelsk Regional Court declared the resolution of the Arkhangelsk Oblast Assembly of Deputies against holding a referendum on banning the import of garbage from other regions into the territory of the Arkhangelsk Oblast as unconstitutional. After this, the Governor of the Arkhangelsk Oblast Igor Orlov, the Arkhangelsk Regional Assembly and the Prosecutor's Office of the Arkhangelsk Oblast appealed against the decision of the Arkhangelsk Regional Court in the Supreme Court of the Russian Federation.

Flag of “Pomorie is not a trash heap!” movement

On May 19, a rally and concert in support of Shies was held at Teryokhin Square in Arkhangelsk. At the same time other mass events were also being held in Arkhangelsk on behalf of the administration. According to estimates by activists of the “Pomorie is not a trash heap!” movement, 8 thousand people came to the rally.

On June 16, a rally was held at the Stroitel cultural center in Severodvinsk in support of activists at Shies station. At the same time, the city administration announced the celebration of the birthday of the Cultural Park. Despite this, the rally attracted 4 thousand people. After the rally, activists marched to Victory Square.

On June 25, 2019, the Supreme Court of the Russian Federation overturned the decision of the Arkhangelsk Regional Court to hold a referendum on the import of waste from other regions into the territory of the Arkhangelsk Oblast.

On July 26, 2019, the “Day of Solidarity with Shies” event was held, during which residents of the region hung red cloth outside their windows. Governor Igor Orlov, who had previously called the protesters “shitholes,” later commented on this event: he decided that people simply hung out their washed clothes to dry.

On August 26, 2019, Levada Center published a survey conducted among residents of the Arkhangelsk Oblast. According to its results, 95% of respondents opposed the construction of a landfill in Shies, only 3% expressed agreement.

On September 22, 2019, an anti-garbage rally was held in Solombala on Teryokhin Square, which was attended by two thousand people.

On September 30, a recording of a meeting was published on the website of the Arkhangelsk Oblast Assembly of Deputies, in which a deputy from the Libertarian Party of Russia demanded the return of a plot of land due to the expiration of the lease as the agreement on the use of the forest area in the area of the Shies station which was concluded in 2018 had expired.

On November 4, 2019, a 12-hour online Civil Solidarity Marathon was held in support of Shies.

On December 8, 2019, more than 10,000 people came to a rally in Kotlas against the construction of a landfill in Shies.

On January 9, 2020, the Arkhangelsk Regional Arbitration Court, at the request of the Urdoma administration, declared the construction of the Shies landfill as illegal.

On October 26, 2020, the 14th Arbitration Court of Appeal confirmed the decision of previous courts to demolish the erected landfill buildings in the area.

On November 6, the initiative group “Clean Urdoma” came to the camp on Shies and began to celebrate the “victory” in the struggle of activists against the construction of a landfill in the Arkhangelsk Oblast, after which the protesters began the systematic closure of posts.

On December 2, 2020, the Arbitration Court of the Northwestern Federal District (St. Petersburg ) accepted the cassation appeal of Technopark LLC dated November 23, 2020 suspending the demolition of the landfill for up to two months.

On January 9, 2021, the initiative group “Clean Urdoma” published a statement in the community “We are against the landfill in the Lensky district” on VKontakte, in which it declared the completion of protest campaign against the construction of a landfill. At the same time, the activists who remain to live in the tent camps were proposed to be considered unrelated to continue the fight against the construction of the landfill, since they allegedly left the “Stop-Shies” coalition.

On January 12, 2021, the management of Technopark LLC stated that activists at Shies station were hindering reclamation efforts by refusing to move the tent camp from a land plot of 15 hectares. The activists stated that it was too early to leave and they were going to continue to document violations committed by the contractor.

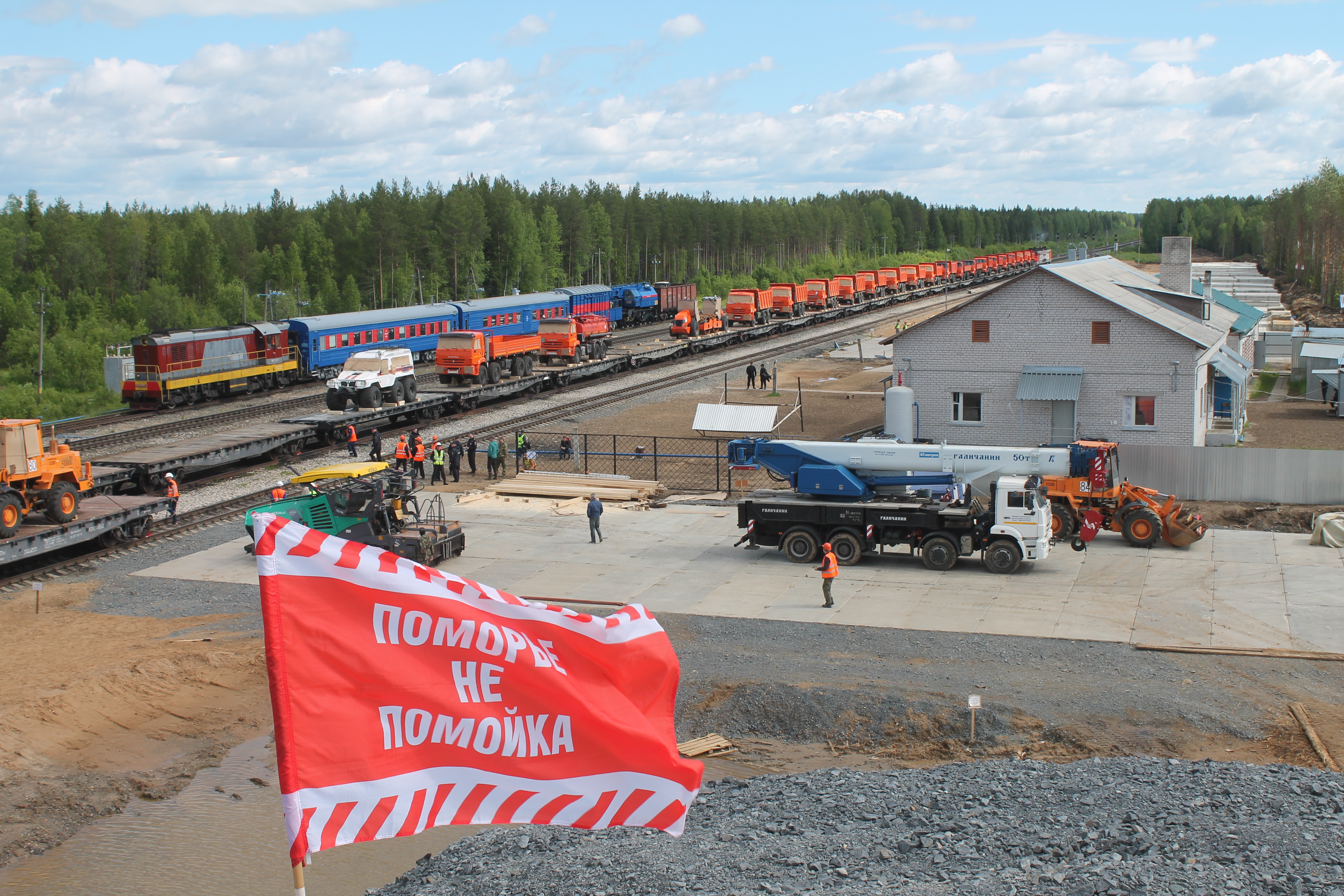
Flag saying: "Pomorie is not a garbage dump" near the landfill

On February 4, 2021, the "Leningrad" activist camp at Shies station was destroyed by the troops of National Guard of Russia, tents and other property, as well as food supplies were destroyed and buried in a deep pit dug by an excavator.

Also on February 4, 2021, in St. Petersburg, the Arbitration Court of the Northwestern Federal District considered the appeal of the Technopark company against the decision to demolish landfill buildings, which was previously made by the Arbitration Court of the Arkhangelsk Oblast, and upheld the decision of demolishing the landfill.

On the morning of February 18, 2021, the police blocked all roads tens of kilometers to the Shies station from Madmas and Urdoma, and then police vehicles arrived. The activists who were at the reserve post “Banya” were detained, and were taken to Yarensk for interrogation. During the same day, the posts "Bonfire" and "Fortress", were destroyed, and the post "Bath" was looted and burned. The activists were accused of unauthorized occupation of the area, and a trial was scheduled for early March.

In December 2021, Vladimir Putin demanded Minister of Ecology and Natural Resources, Alexander Kozlov to explain why, after over the three years of the project, project documentation for the elimination of 104 illegal landfills was never generated and instructed him to do so.

== Separatism ==
Slogans such "Pomorie is not a garbage dump" and "No to Moscow garbage" became highly popular amongst Pomor separatists. who seek an independent Pomorie (sometimes referred to as Biarmia) within the borders of Arkhangelsk Oblast and also include Murmansk Oblast and Nenets Autonomous Okrug as part of a proposed state.

== Authorities response and consequences ==
- Initially, regional authorities sought to hush up this news story, but almost immediately it became clear that this strategy was ineffective. Moreover, in many ways, it was the silence of the authorities that caused particular discontent among people and helped spread information online.
- The first reaction of the governor of the Arkhangelsk Oblast, Igor Orlov, was ambiguous. On April 5, at a public meeting with representatives of veterans and trade union organizations, he stated: “I have lived here [in the Arkhangelsk Oblast for more than twenty years. My children were born here. And every scoundrel, which no one here can even call, is trying to call me something incomprehensible: either a Kaliningrader or a Ukrainian. I don’t care about their ratings and votes, what they think about me.” This is how he responded to the statement of one of the meeting participants that 96% of residents of the Arkhangelsk Oblast are “against all these government decisions on Shies and all landfills.” This caused a huge wave of negativity. After the statement, a huge number of memes appeared on the network, and at rallies people ridiculed and criticized Orlov in every possible way for the above words.
- The reaction of the federal authorities appeared later; on May 16, Vladimir Putin said at the ONF media forum: “Moscow cannot be overgrown with garbage, it is a city of ten million. But there is no need to create problems in other regions either. In any case, it should be in dialogue with the people who live there. I will definitely talk with the head of the region and Sergey Sobyanin. They cannot decide this privately, without asking the opinions of people who live in close proximity to these test sites"
- At the beginning of 2020, the Minister of the Ministry of Internal Affairs of Komi, General Viktor Polovnikov, who was previously responsible for the police escort of fuel for the Shies testing site and the suppression of protests by environmental activists, was arrested on suspicion of taking a bribe.
- Governor of the Arkhangelsk region Igor Orlov and Head of Komi Sergey Gaplikov simultaneously resigned and left their posts in 2020.
- New Acting Governor of the Arkhangelsk Region, Alexander Tsybulsky and Acting Head of Komi Vladimir Uyba, appointed in April 2020, opposed the landfill project at Shies.
- On April 29, 2020, in an interview with the media, Alexander Tsybulsky promised to close the Shies project.
- On June 2, 2020, by order of the Government of the Arkhangelsk Oblast “On termination of the agreement on support of an investment project between the Government of the Arkhangelsk Oblast and the limited liability company Technopark dated May 20, 2019 dated June 2, 2020 No. 217-rp” the agreement between the Government of Arkhangelsk was terminated region and Technopark LLC. Upon termination of the agreement, information about the investment project of the EcoTechnoPark Shies company must be excluded from the register of priority investment projects in the Arkhangelsk Oblast. According to a court order, reclamation of a damaged piece of land would also be carried out at Shies station.

== In popular culture ==
=== In Music ===
- Свалка в нашей невинной тайге (автор — Е. Ратникова, песня — П. Картошкин) on YouTube // Александр Иваницкий. 25 декабря 2018.
- Марат Шатский — Это наше болото / This is our swamp on YouTube // esisergio. 28 января 2019.
- Лариса Бартева. Северное ополчение on YouTube // Семён Алёхов. 7 апреля 2019.
- Шиес — наша печаль on YouTube // Шиес. Архангельск. Экопротест. 27 апреля 2019.
- Руки прочь от Шиеса!!! on YouTube // Евгений Тропин. 29 апреля 2019. (Песня про наш дом. Про нашу Тайгу. Автор песни Павел Картошкин. Песня «Свалка в нашей невинной тайге»)
- Шиес on YouTube // Артем Уланов. 4 июня 2019.
- Песня про Шиес on YouTube // Серега Верещак. 14 июня 2019. (Автор-исполнитель из Няндомы)
- Шиес. Июнь 2019. Песня «Костёр» (исполняется автором) on YouTube // Елена Захаренкова. 15 июня 2019.
- Шиес. Песня Николая Мелехова on YouTube // Net_Svalke. 23 июня 2019.
- Шиес. Песня о мусорной реформе on YouTube // Дед Архимед. 10 июля 2019.
- Рваные кеды по шпалам на Шиес! on YouTube // Esipёnok Production. 27 июля 2019.
- Шиес наш! on YouTube // Андрей Чекмарёв. 26 сентября 2019 г.] (Евгений Кокшаров, выступление в Коряжме)
- Шиес — Время Рассвета on YouTube // Юрий Полянский. 5 декабря 2019. (Песня в поддержку жителей Севера, страны, за чистую и разумную экологию. За отмену мегасвалки на Шиесе и в других регионах страны. Стоп-Шиес! Stop Shies!)
- Ольга Дубова — Шиес on YouTube // Ольга Дубова. 23 декабря 2019.
