= Shiyes railway station =

Railway station in Lensky District, Russia

Shiyes Шиес
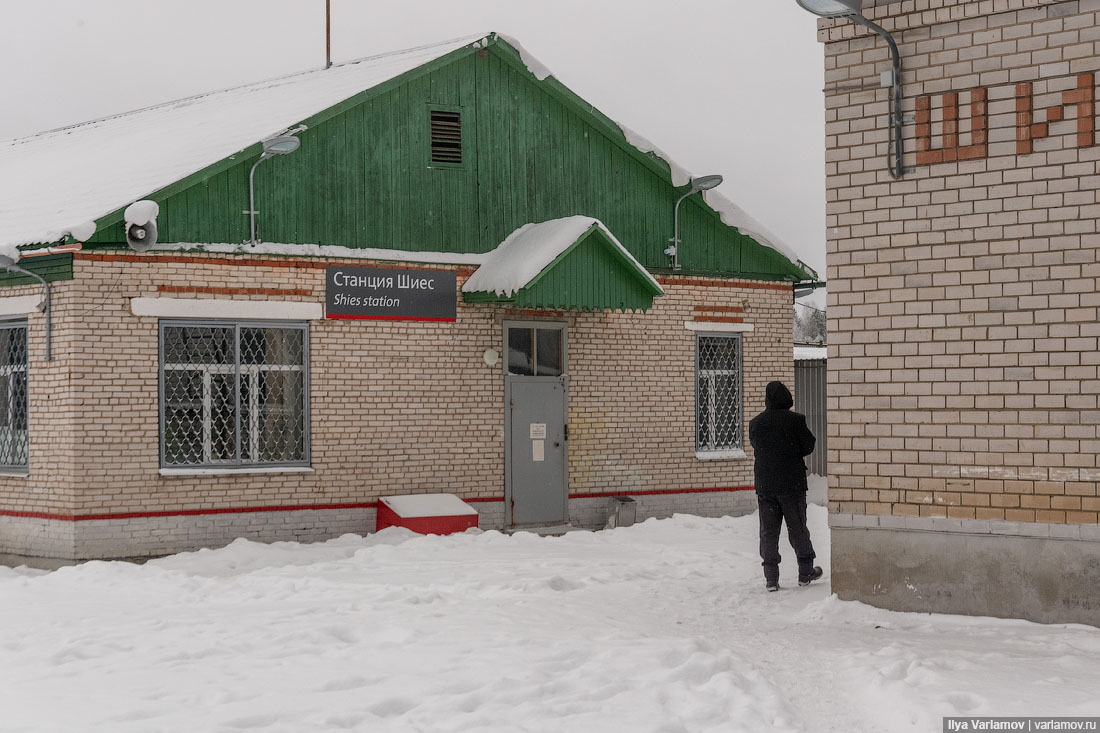

General information
- Location: Arkhangelsk Oblast, Russia
- Coordinates: 61°53′46″N 49°04′19″E
- Owner: Russian Railways

Other information
- Fare zone: 0

History
- Opened: 1940

Services
Preceding station	Northern Railway (Russia)	Following station
Location

Shiyes railway station is a railway station in Lensky District, Arkhangelsk Oblast, Russia. It is located on the section of the Northern Railway between the stations Urdoma (30 km) and Madmas (19 km), 4 km from the internal border with the Republic of Komi. It is part Urdomskoye Urban Settlement.

== Settlement ==
About 300 meter the station there was a logging settlement with the same name. In 1945 two residential barracks appeared, a small dining room and a shop. Construction was continuous, the village gradually grew. In 1951–1955, an elementary school and 54 panel houses were constructed. A store, a new canteen, a bakery, a kindergarten, a pigsty were also built. Later on production facilities rose: a power station, a garage with steam heating, a tare shop, a mechanized bottom warehouse, a groove. The doors of a seven-year school and nursery, a club and a large store, four new apartment houses opened hospitably. In 1971, the Shiyes logging camp became part of the Verkhne-Lupinskogo timber industry enterprise and in 1974 it ceased to exist. The last people left the settlement in 2002.

== Landfill ==
In July 2018 two hunters from Urdoma discovered that a huge landfill is under construction nearby, a step that created public outrage in the region due to concerns over pollution and ecological damage leading to the 2018–2020 Shies protests.
