= Vyyemkovo =

Vyyemkovo Выемково
- Village
- Location within Arkhangelsk Oblast Location within Russia
- Coordinates: 62°06′N 49°08′E
- Country: Russia
- Region: Arkhangelsk Oblast
- District: Lensky District
- Time zone: UTC+3:00

Vyyemkovo (Russian: Выемково) is a rural locality (a village) in Safronovskoye Rural Settlement of Lensky District, Arkhangelsk Oblast, Russia. The population was 1 as of 2010.

== Geography ==
Vyyemkovo is located on the Vychegda River, 10 km south of Yarensk (the district's administrative centre) by road. Lantysh is the nearest rural locality.
