= Pustosh =

Pustosh (Russian: Пустошь) is the name of several rural localities in Russia:

- Pustosh, Kotlassky District, Arkhangelsk Oblast, a village in Cheryomushskoye Rural Settlement of Kotlassky District, Arkhangelsk Oblast
- Pustosh, Lensky District, Arkhangelsk Oblast, a village in Safronovskoye Rural Settlement of Lensky District, Arkhangelsk Oblast
