= Belopashino =

Belopashino Белопашино
- Village
- Location within Arkhangelsk Oblast Location within Russia
- Coordinates: 61°39′N 48°07′E
- Country: Russia
- Region: Arkhangelsk Oblast
- District: Lensky District
- Time zone: UTC+3:00

Belopashino (Russian: Белопашино) is a rural locality (a village) in Lensky District, Arkhangelsk Oblast, Russia. The population was 235 as of 2012. There are 3 streets.

== Geography ==
Belopashino is located on the Vychegda River, 102 km southwest of Yarensk (the district's administrative centre) by road. Soyga is the nearest rural locality.
