= Viktor Uspaskich =

Lithuanian politician

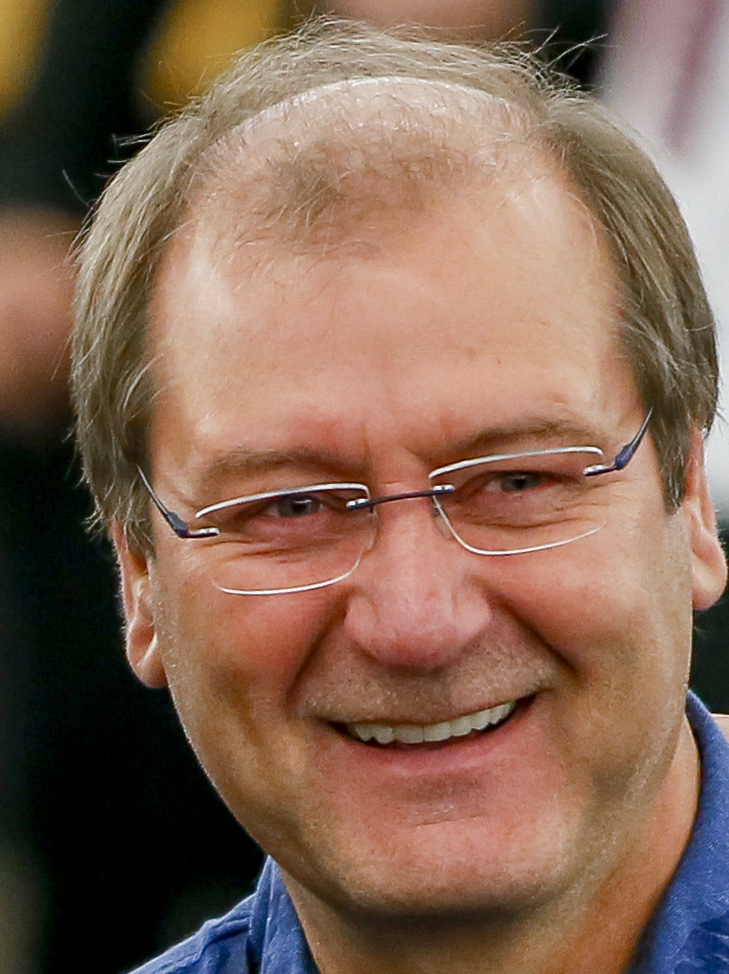
- Uspaskich in 2019

Member of the European Parliament for Lithuania
- In office 25 May 2014 – 9 June 2024
- In office 7 June 2009 – 2012
- Succeeded by: Justina Vitkauskaitė

Member of the Seimas
- In office 2000–2005
- Preceded by: Algimantas Salamakinas
- Succeeded by: Virginija Baltraitienė
- Constituency: Kėdainiai
- In office 2008–2009
- Succeeded by: Jonas Pinskus
- In office 2012–2014
- Succeeded by: Gintaras Tamošiūnas

Minister of Economy
- In office 29 October 2004 – 29 June 2005
- Preceded by: Petras Čėsna
- Succeeded by: Kęstutis Daukšys

Personal details
- Born: 24 July 1959 (age 67) Urdoma, Arkhangelsk Oblast, Russian SFSR, Soviet Union
- Party: Labour Party (2003–15; 2017–2022; 2024–present); Independent (2015–17; 2022–24)
- Spouse: Jolanta Blažytė (m. 1991; div. 2017)
- Children: 4

Viktor Uspaskich (Russian: Виктор Викторович Успасских, Lithuanian: Viktoras Uspaskichas; born 24 July 1959) is a Russian-born Lithuanian entrepreneur and politician who was a Member of the European Parliament from 2009 to 2012 and again from 2014 to 2024.

== Early life ==
Uspaskich was born in the village of Urdoma, Arkhangelsk Oblast in what was then the Russian SFSR. He was born into a family of forestry workers. He graduated from Urdom high school in 1976. From 1977 to 1979, he served in the Soviet Army. After the army, he continued to work in the construction of gas pipelines. He arrived in the Lithuanian SSR in 1985 and worked as a welder in the gas industry. He left shortly after for Finland, before returning in 1987, divorcing his Belarusian wife with two children (Julia, Eduard) and marrying Jolanta Blažytė. He formed his own company Efektas in 1990, and took citizenship of the newly formed Republic of Lithuania in 1991.

With power he quickly gained tremendous success in his business empire that now includes the importation of natural gas from Gazprom, in addition to flourishing enterprises in the food production (Kėdainių konservų fabrikas, UAB) and animal fodder industries.

== Political career ==
Between 1997 and 2003 was chairman of the Association of Lithuanian Employers, and in 2000 was selected as a non-party member of the New Union social liberal party in the Seimas (parliament). His own political ambitions and conflicts with party leader Artūras Paulauskas led him to form the Darbo Partija (Labour Party) in 2003. The DP scored highly during the 2004 European Parliamentary Elections, gaining 30.2% of the popular vote and returning five MEPs. That same year, he became Minister of Economic Affairs in Lithuania's coalition government. He held this until 2006.

Since 2014, and previously from 2009 to 2012, Viktor Uspaskich has been a Member of the European Parliament for Lithuania.

The European Parliament has twice stripped Uspaskich's legal immunity.

== Controversies ==
=== Tax fraud ===
In the end of May 2006 his political party Darbo Partija (Labour Party) was suspected of income violations by the financial police.

Victor Uspaskich flew to his hometown Urdoma (Russia) to his brother's funeral and came back in late 2007. He is believed to have been hiding from the law enforcement and interpol. Lithuania had issued an arrest warrant for Uspaskich, who was in Russia, as he was suspected of tax fraud. In July 2013, Uspaskich was sentenced to 4 years in prison for tax fraud.

He has not served the prison sentence claiming his legal immunity as member of the Lithuanian Parliament and, since the May 2014 elections, member of the European Parliament. Even though the immunity has been stripped, Lithuanian authorities were not able to actually persecute Uspaskich due to limitation period and the formal reorganisation of the Labour Party.

=== Pseudoscientific beliefs ===
Uspaskich is well known for his open eccentric and pseudoscientific beliefs. In a Labour Party conference in 2014, he used his keynote speech to speak about the healing qualities of "unconditional love". On 30 December 2015, Uspaskich published a free access book titled "My Sicknesses and Enemies - My Greatest Teachers", in which he stated that his then-wife Jolanta violates "the laws of the Universe" by using too much masculine "solar energy", as opposed to feminine "lunar energy". He also claimed that greenhouse grown vegetables lack taste as they lack this alleged "lunar energy", and recommends sexual abstinence to men to protect their intelligence.

In a 2019 interview with TV host Kristina Rimienė, Uspaskich claimed that he has ascended to "another layer" and attempted to study the TV host's "frequency" by holding her hand.

==== Alleged COVID-19 cure ====
On 27 December 2020, Uspaskich started advertising mineral water that can be bought via a network of individuals across the country. He claims that the water improves the immune system and protects against COVID-19. These statements have been condemned by politicians, medics, various officials, as well as by his own party members.

The company selling the water is mainly owned by Uspaskich's children.

Lithuania's authorities have started investigations of illicit advertisement which can lead to a fine of up to €100,000.

=== Homophobic and transphobic remarks ===
On 10 January 2021, Uspaskich published a Facebook video where he spoke about LGBT people, calling them "perverts":

Those who put their dick under a skirt and go into the street and shout, they are (...) perverts, and such things must not be tolerated.

He has been asked to apologise publicly by his group within the European Parliament, and claimed he had "only aimed at those who insulted him, not the LGBT community as a whole". Renew Europe, after an internal disciplinary procedure, has terminated his membership. After this, the Labour Party announced its withdrawal from Alliance of Liberals and Democrats for Europe Party.

=== Fake news websites ===
He has financially supported 77.lt, a fake news website, according to national broadcaster LRT.
