= Pustosh, Lensky District, Arkhangelsk Oblast =

Pustosh Пустошь
- Village
- Location within Arkhangelsk Oblast Location within Russia
- Coordinates: 62°05′N 48°57′E
- Country: Russia
- Region: Arkhangelsk Oblast
- District: Lensky District
- Time zone: UTC+3:00

Pustosh (Russian: Пустошь) is a rural locality (a village) in Safronovskoye Rural Settlement of Lensky District, Arkhangelsk Oblast, Russia. The population was 7 as of 2010.

== Geography ==
Pustosh is located 19 km southwest of Yarensk (the district's administrative centre) by road. Zapan Yarenga is the nearest rural locality.
