= Lena, Arkhangelsk Oblast =

Lena Лена
- Selo
- Location within Arkhangelsk Oblast Location within Russia
- Coordinates: 62°04′N 48°38′E
- Country: Russia
- Region: Arkhangelsk Oblast
- District: Lensky District
- Time zone: UTC+3:00

Lena (Russian: Лена) is a rural locality (a selo) in Kozminskoye Rural Settlement of Lensky District, Arkhangelsk Oblast, Russia. The population was 372 as of 2010. There are 5 streets.

== Geography ==
Lena is located 34 km southwest of Yarensk (the district's administrative centre) by road. Shubinskaya is the nearest rural locality.
