= Urdoma =

Urdoma (Russian: Урдома) is the name of several inhabited localities in Russia.

Urban localities

- Urdoma, Lensky District, Arkhangelsk Oblast, a work settlement in Lensky District of Arkhangelsk Oblast

Rural localities

- Urdoma, Kozminsky Selsoviet, Lensky District, Arkhangelsk Oblast, a selo in Kozminsky Selsoviet of Lensky District of Arkhangelsk Oblast
- Urdoma, Yaroslavl Oblast, a settlement in Pomogalovsky Rural Okrug of Tutayevsky District of Yaroslavl Oblast
