= Jolanta Blažytė =

Lithuanian manager (born 1965)

- Born: 1 May 1965 (age 59); Kaunas, Lithuania
- Occupation(s): business executive and entrepreneur
- Known for: chairwoman of Vikonda
- Spouse: Viktor Uspaskich (m. 1991; div. 2017)
- Children: 2

Jolanta Blažytė (born 1 May 1965) is a Lithuanian business executive and entrepreneur, chairwoman and shareholder of the Lithuanian company UAB Vikonda and (as of June 2013) the richest Lithuanian woman. According to the weekly "Ekonomika.lt", her assets are Lt 250 million (EUR 72.4 million).

== Biography ==
Blažytė's parents were both engineers. Her father was a civil engineer. Her mother ran a restaurant in Kaunas.

After graduating from high school, Blažytė graduated from the Kaunas University of Technology with a degree in civil engineering. She did a student internship in Leningrad, Russia. After graduating, Blažytė worked at the gas construction company "Kauno dujotiekio statyba", where she met her future husband. She became commercial director at Vikonda.

Blažytė was married to Viktor Uspaskich, a politician and former Minister of Economic Affairs. They have two daughters Laura and Justė and divorced in 2017. She lives in Kėdainiai.
