= Lena, Kuyurgazinsky District, Republic of Bashkortostan =

Lena Лена
- Village
- Location within Bashkortostan Location within Russia
- Coordinates: 52°48′N 55°36′E
- Country: Russia
- Region: Bashkortostan
- District: Kuyurgazinsky District
- Time zone: UTC+5:00

Lena (Russian: Лена) is a rural locality (a village) in Taymasovsky Selsoviet, Kuyurgazinsky District, Bashkortostan, Russia. The population was 40 as of 2010. There is 1 street.

== Geography ==
Lena is located 35 km northwest of Yermolayevo (the district's administrative centre) by road. Yalchikayevo is the nearest rural locality.
