= Recycling rates by country =

The following table gives the percentages of municipal waste that is recycled, incinerated, incinerated to produce energy and landfilled.

Recycling rates by country 2019
| Country | % recycling | % composting | % incineration with energy recovery | % incineration without energy recovery | % other recovery | % landfill | % other disposal |
|---|---|---|---|---|---|---|---|
| Australia | 24.6 | 19.8 | 0.6 | 0 | 9.5 | 55 | 0 |
| Austria | 26.5 | 32.6 | 38.9 | 0 | 0 | 2.1 | 0 |
| Belgium | 34.1 | 20.6 | 42.3 | 0.5 | 1.6 | 0 | 0 |
| Costa Rica | 3 | 3.8 | 0 | 0 | 0 | 86.5 | 6.7 |
| Czech Republic | 22.8 | 11.7 | 16.9 | 0 | 0.6 | 47.9 | 0 |
| Denmark | 33.5 | 18 | 47.5 | 0 | 0.6 | 0 | 0 |
| Estonia | 30.3 | 2.7 | 48.4 | 0 | 0 | 18.1 | 0 |
| Finland | 29.3 | 14.1 | 55.6 | 0 | 0 | 0 | 0 |
| France | 23.6 | 20.7 | 32.9 | 0 | 0 | 22 | 0 |
| Germany | 48 | 18.7 | 31.6 | 0 | 0 | 0 | 1.2 |
| Greece | 16 | 5 | 1.3 | 0 | 0 | 77.7 | 0 |
| Hungary | 26.5 | 9.3 | 13.6 | 0 | 0 | 50.6 | 0 |
| Ireland | 28.2 | 9.7 | 46.5 | 0 | 0 | 15.5 | 0 |
| Israel | 6.8 | 15.1 | 1.7 | 0 | 0 | 76.5 | 0 |
| Italy | 32.5 | 22.9 | 20.5 | 0.6 | 1 | 22.5 | 0 |
| Japan | 19.2 | 0.4 | 74.9 | 4.7 | 0 | 0 | 0 |
| Latvia | 35.4 | 4.9 | 3.3 | 0 | 0 | 56.4 | 0 |
| Lithuania | 31.3 | 25.2 | 16.8 | 0 | 2.2 | 24.5 | 0 |
| Luxembourg | 29.7 | 19.2 | 46.7 | 0 | 0 | 4.4 | 0 |
| Netherlands | 27.7 | 29.2 | 40.6 | 1.1 | 0 | 1.4 | 0 |
| Norway | 29.9 | 11 | 49.5 | 0 | 6 | 3.7 | 0 |
| Poland | 25 | 9 | 21.5 | 1.4 | 0 | 43 | 0 |
| Portugal | 12.8 | 17.6 | 19.8 | 0 | 0 | 49.8 | 0 |
| Slovakia | 26.9 | 11.7 | 55 | 3.7 | 0 | 52.2 | 0 |
| Slovenia | 51.5 | 20.3 | 15.7 | 0 | 0 | 12.4 | 0 |
| South Korea | 56.5 | 3.2 | 21.7 | 4 | 0 | 12.7 | 1.9 |
| Spain | 19.7 | 18.3 | 11 | 0 | 0 | 51.1 | 0 |
| Sweden | 32.5 | 14.2 | 52.6 | 0 | 0 | 0 | 0 |
| Switzerland | 29.9 | 23.1 | 47 | 0 | 0 | 0 | 0 |
| Turkey | 11.9 | 0.4 | 0 | 0 | 0 | 87.7 | 0 |
| United Kingdom | 26.9 | 17.4 | 39.3 | 2 | 0.4 | 11.2 | 0 |
| United States (Note: Data from 2018) | 23.6 | 8.5 | 11.8 | 0 | 6.1 | 50 | 0 |
