= Urdoma, Lensky District, Arkhangelsk Oblast =

Urdoma Урдома
- Urban-type settlement
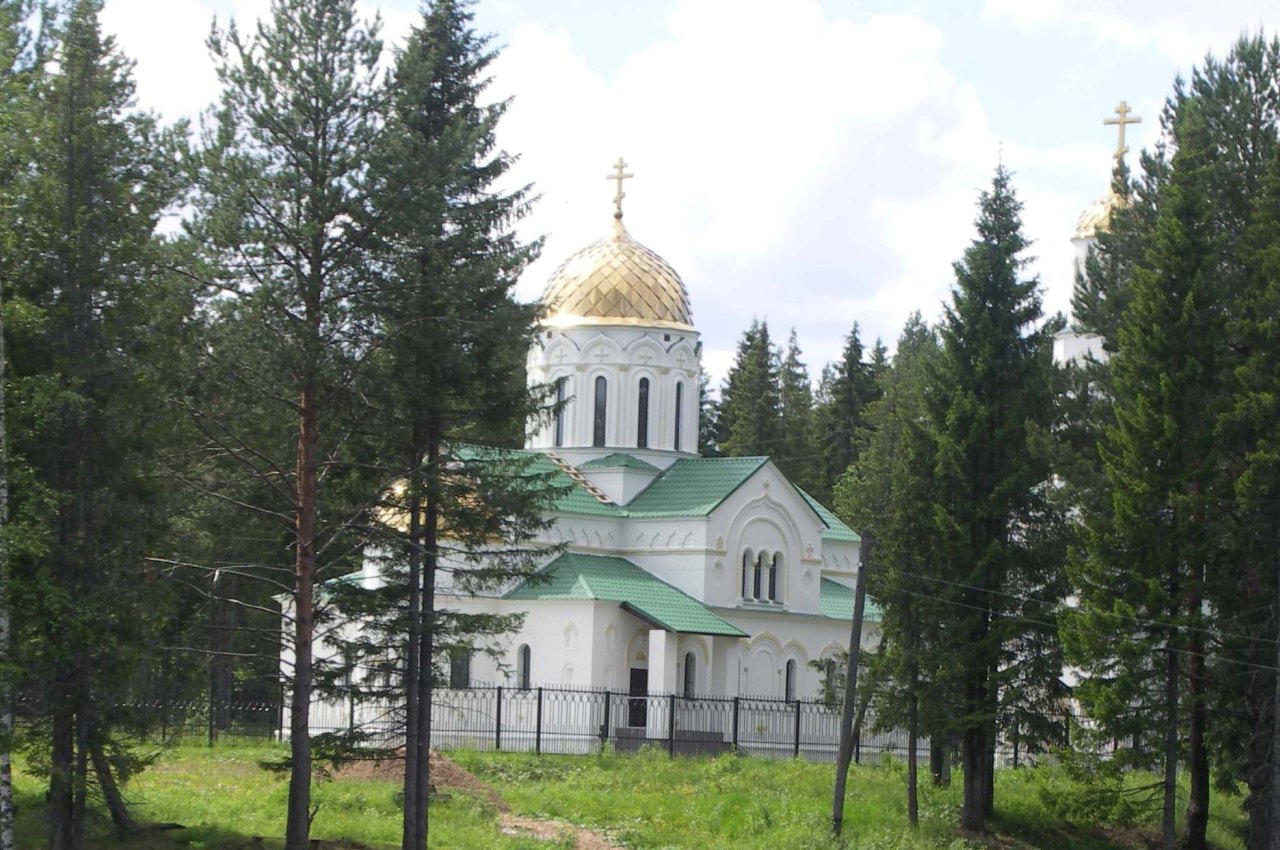

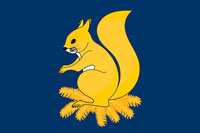
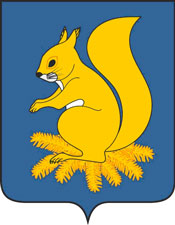
- Flag Coat of arms
- Interactive map of Urdoma
- Location of Urdoma Urdoma (Arkhangelsk Oblast)
- Coordinates: 61°45′22″N 48°32′38″E
- Country: Russia
- Federal subject: Arkhangelsk Oblast
- Administrative district: Lensky District

Population (2010 Census)
  - Total: 4,577
  - Estimate (2023): 3,932 (−14.1%)

Municipal status
  - Municipal district: Lensky Municipal District
  - Urban settlement: Urdomskoye Urban Settlement
  - Capital of: Urdomskoye Urban Settlement
- Time zone: UTC+3 (MSK)
- Postal code: 165720
- OKTMO ID: 11635157051
- Website: urdomainform.narod.ru/index.html

Urdoma (Russian: Урдома) is an urban locality (an urban-type settlement) in Lensky District of Arkhangelsk Oblast, Russia, located on the Verkhnyaya Lupya River, a tributary of the Vychegda. Municipally, it is the administrative center of Urdomskoye Urban Settlement, the only urban settlement in the district. Population: 4,577 (2010 census); 4,637 (2002 census); 4,998 (1989 Soviet census)..

== History ==
Urdoma was first mentioned in the 17th century sources as a part of Yarensky Uyezd. In the course of the administrative reform carried out in 1708 by Peter the Great, the area was included into Archangelgorod Governorate. In 1780, the governorate was abolished and transformed into Vologda Viceroyalty. In 1918, Yarensky Uyezd was transferred to the newly formed Northern Dvina Governorate, and in 1924 the uyezds were abolished in favor of the new divisions, the districts (raions). Urdoma became a part of Solvychegodsky District formed on June 1, 1924, and in 1929 Urdomsky Selsoviet was merged into Lensky District of Northern Krai. In the 1940s, a railway station on the railroad connecting Kotlas to Vorkuta was built in Urdoma, and the settlement expanded, merging, in particular, with the neighboring settlement of Nyanda. It was granted urban-type settlement status in 2006. During the 2018–2020 Shies protests, the municipality sided with the environmentalists.

== Economy ==
=== Industry ===
Timber industry is well-developed in Urdoma, which is the center of Verkhnelupyinsky Woodworking Company (Верхне-Лупьинский леспромхоз).

=== Transportation ===
Urdoma serves as a train station, and is located on the railway connecting Kotlas and Vorkuta.

The settlement is connected to the all-seasonal road network by the road branching off the road connecting Solvychegodsk and Yarensk. All these roads are in a poor condition.

Urdoma has an oil-pumping station in the Baltic Pipeline System.

== Religion ==
The Kazan Virgin Church in Urdoma was consecrated in 1999 by the Patriarch of the Russian Orthodox Church, Alexy II, and at the time of consecration was the only church in Arkhangelsk Oblast with golden domes.

There is also the Saint Nicholas Chapel in Urdoma, consecrated in 1998.

The Resurrection Church, which is on the list of protected architecture monuments, is actually located in the village of Urdoma on the right bank of the Vychegda, not in the urban-type settlement of Urdoma.

== Notable people ==
- Viktor Uspaskich (born 1959), a Russian born Lithuanian entrepreneur, professional welder and politician.

== See also ==
- Administrative divisions of Arkhangelsk Oblast
