= Aleksinsky Quarry =

Landfill site in Russia

Coordinates: 56.3583°N 36.8017°E

Aleksinsky Quarry — is a rubbish dump for household waste situated in Klin within 70 km from Moscow, Russia. It stores about 5 million cubic meters of municipal solid waste. Every day it receives more than 250 garbage trucks with a volume of 15 cubic meters. The height of the garbage dump is about 25 meters. Since 2014 the dump has received for about 4 million tons of waste. Aleksinsky Quarry is a threat to people's health.

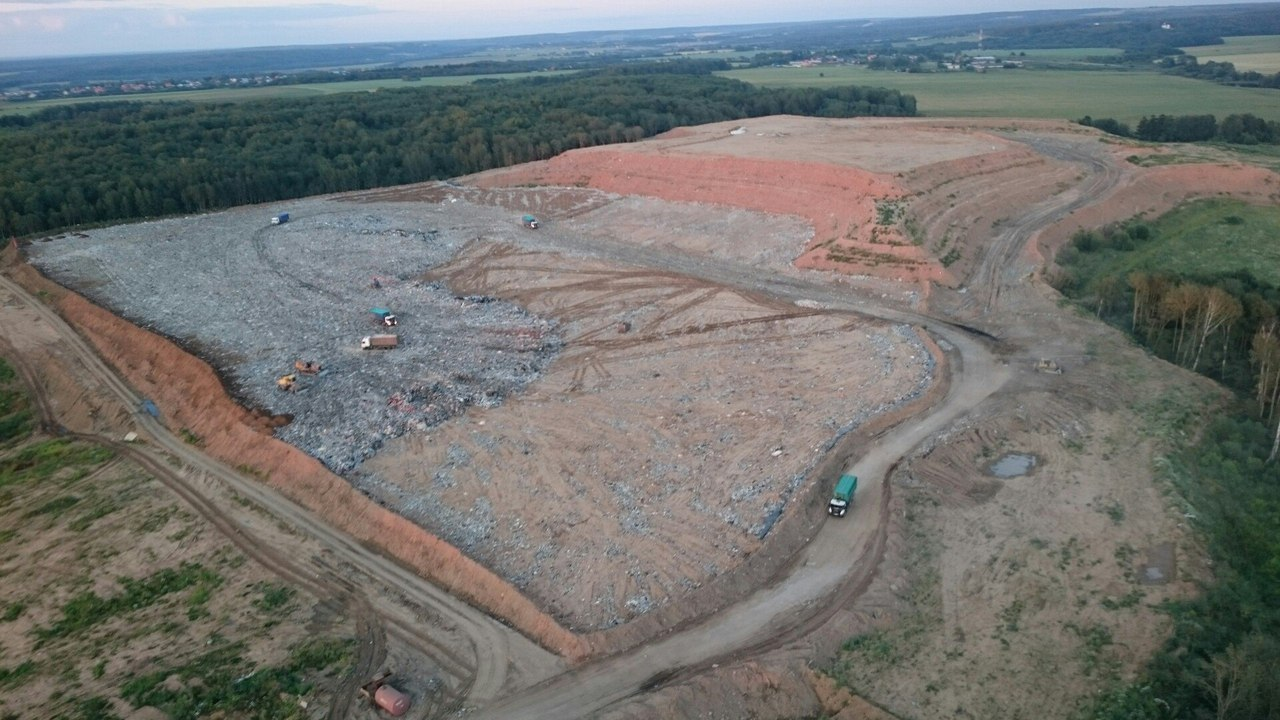
The landfill site "Aleksinsky Quarry" next to Klin, August 2017

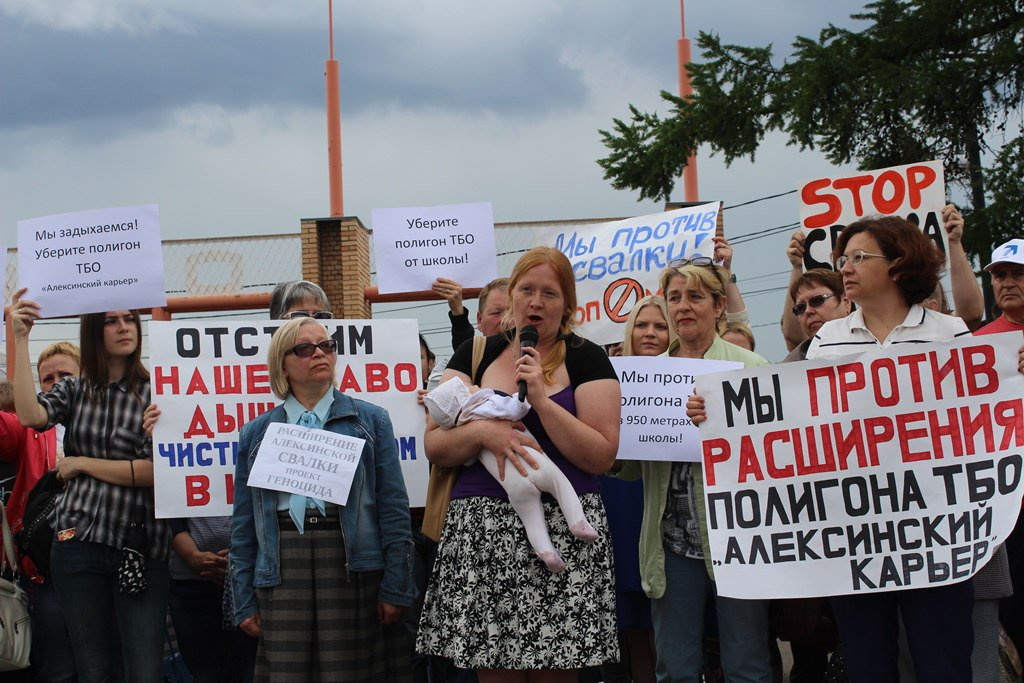
Demonstration against stink from the rubbish dump in Klin

== History of the rubbish dump ==
Aleksinsky Quarry is situated within 2 km from the city of Klin, 1 km from a school and less than 500 meters from residents' houses. At first sand was excavated there but then it became a local garbage dump for Klin. From 1993 to 2013 the dump received about 1.5 million tons of waste.

At the order of the Russian President the dump had to be closed and reclaimed along with others in Moscow Oblast in 2013. In February 2014, the Moscow Oblast's Ministry of Ecology reported the end of the dump exploitation because of the rated capacity depletion. The same year, violating Russian law, the dump restarted its work, not being in the register of municipal solid waste disposal. Millions of tons of garbage started arriving from Moscow without any following of disposal process control. For the period from 2014 to 2015, a deep sand quarry turned into a huge hill. In 2014 about three million tons of waste was dumped, in other words twice the quantity as for the previous 20 years.

== Ecological disaster ==
Firstly local authorities ignored the problem, then promised to solve it, and finally got down to legalize the dump. The landfill site got emission allowances and was included in the register of municipal solid waste disposal. The residents were refused access to review these documents. According to the Ministry of Ecology of Moscow Oblast, the operating company frequently violated project requirements, leaving waste uncovered without soil layers and not using any waste treatment and landfill gas capturing technologies. All these violations have led to a serious impact on the environment. A leachate has leaked to groundwater; people feel the poisoning stink of landfill gases every day; flocks of seagulls put at risk the functioning of a local aerodrome. The smell affect to visitors of Tchaikovsky State House-Museum.

In 2017, The Emergency Situations Ministry detected that the concentration of hydrogen sulphide in the air exceeded a threshold limit value by 25 times in the living area. People's health has worsened noticeably, the number of patients with cancer has increased.

While planning to double the dump's square, local authorities keep reassuring people that everything is under control and there is nothing to worry about.

Demonstrations advocating for the closing and recultivation of the Aleksinsky dump gathered more than 500 people
