= Lena, Ilishevsky District, Republic of Bashkortostan =

Lena Лена
- Village
- Location within Bashkortostan Location within Russia
- Coordinates: 55°17′N 54°29′E
- Country: Russia
- Region: Bashkortostan
- District: Ilishevsky District
- Time zone: UTC+5:00

Lena (Russian: Лена) is a rural locality (a village) in Syultinsky Selsoviet, Ilishevsky District, Bashkortostan, Russia. The population was 25 as of 2010. There is 1 street.

== Geography ==
Lena is located 27 km southeast of Verkhneyarkeyevo (the district's administrative centre) by road. Tashchishma is the nearest rural locality.
