= Yarensk =

Rural locality in Arkhangelsk Oblast, Russia

Yarensk Я́ренск
- Rural locality
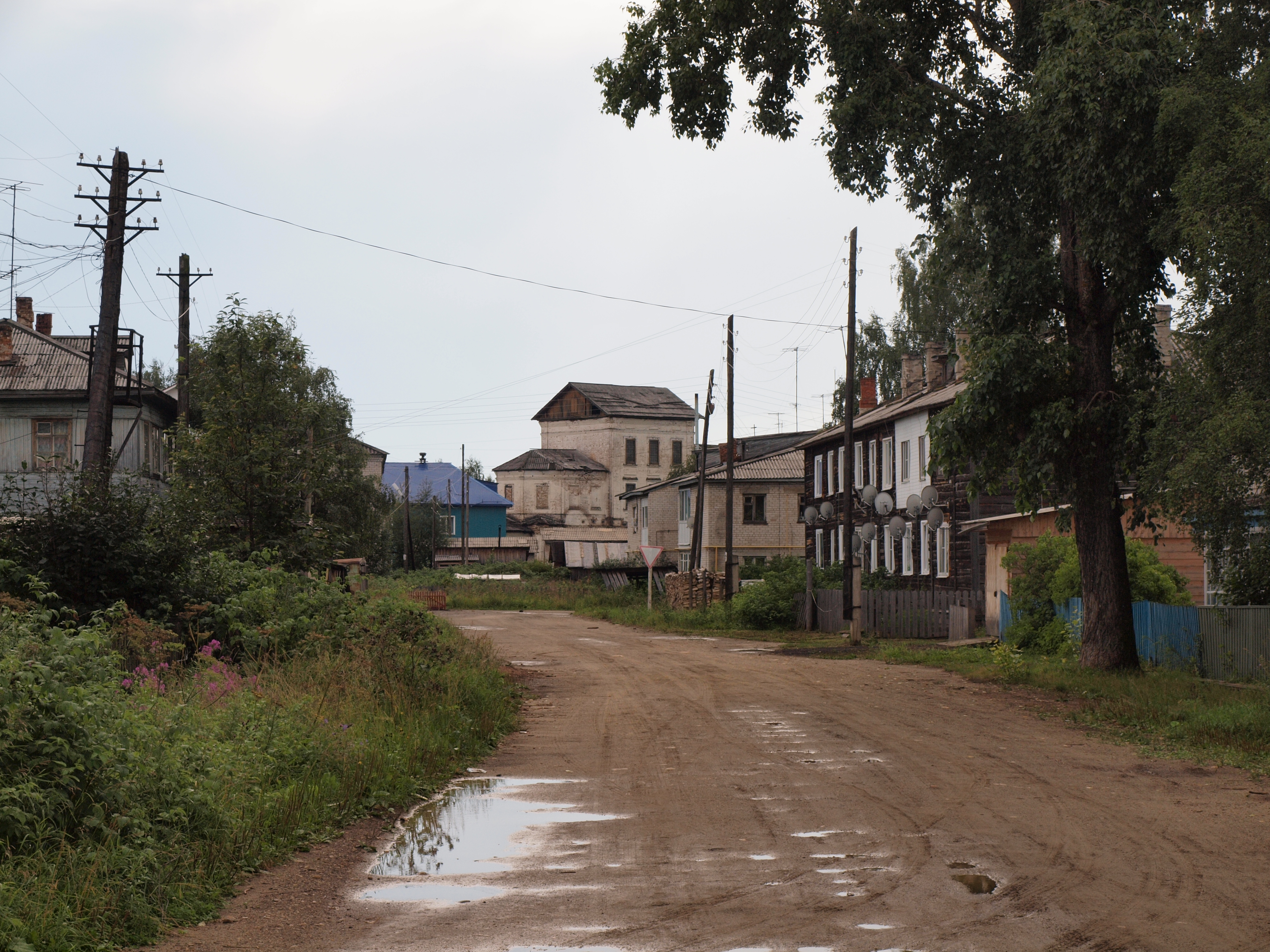
- View of the settlement

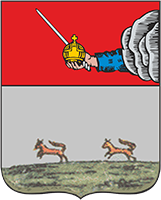
- Coat of arms
- Interactive map of Yarensk
- Location of Yarensk
- Coordinates: 62°10′N 49°06′E
- Country: Russia
- Federal subject: Arkhangelsk Oblast

Population
  - Estimate (1897): 993 )
- Time zone: UTC+3 (MSK)
- Postal code: 165780
- OKTMO ID: 11635420101

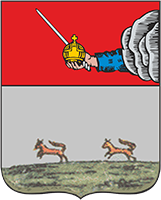
Coat of arms of Yarensk

Yarensk (Russian: Я́ренск) is a rural locality (a selo) and the administrative center of Lensky District of Arkhangelsk Oblast, Russia, located on the bank of the Vychegda River near its confluence with the Yarenga. Population: 3,660 (2010 census); 4,085 (2002 census); 4,246 (1989 Soviet census).

== History ==
The town of Yarensk was documented as early as 1384 as a station on the road leading from Novgorod to the Ural Mountains. In the Russian Empire, it was the seat of a huge uyezd within Vologda Governorate. Much of the present-day Komi Republic was administered from Yarensk. The Tsar used the town as a place of exile, most notably for Prince Vasily Galitzine.

In 1924, the town was demoted in status to that of a rural locality.

From 1930 onwards forced settlers who died as they were transported from Kotlas into exile were buried in the Yarensk village graveyard. The burials were uncovered in 1996 by schoolchildren; that year a cross was erected on the burial site.

== Culture ==
The modern village has a mid-18th century Orthodox cathedral adapted for use as a local history museum.

== Yarensk in fiction ==
Yarensk was one of the Russian towns visited by Robinson Crusoe in Defoe's novel.
