= Lensky District, Arkhangelsk Oblast =

Lensky District Ленский район (Russian)
- District
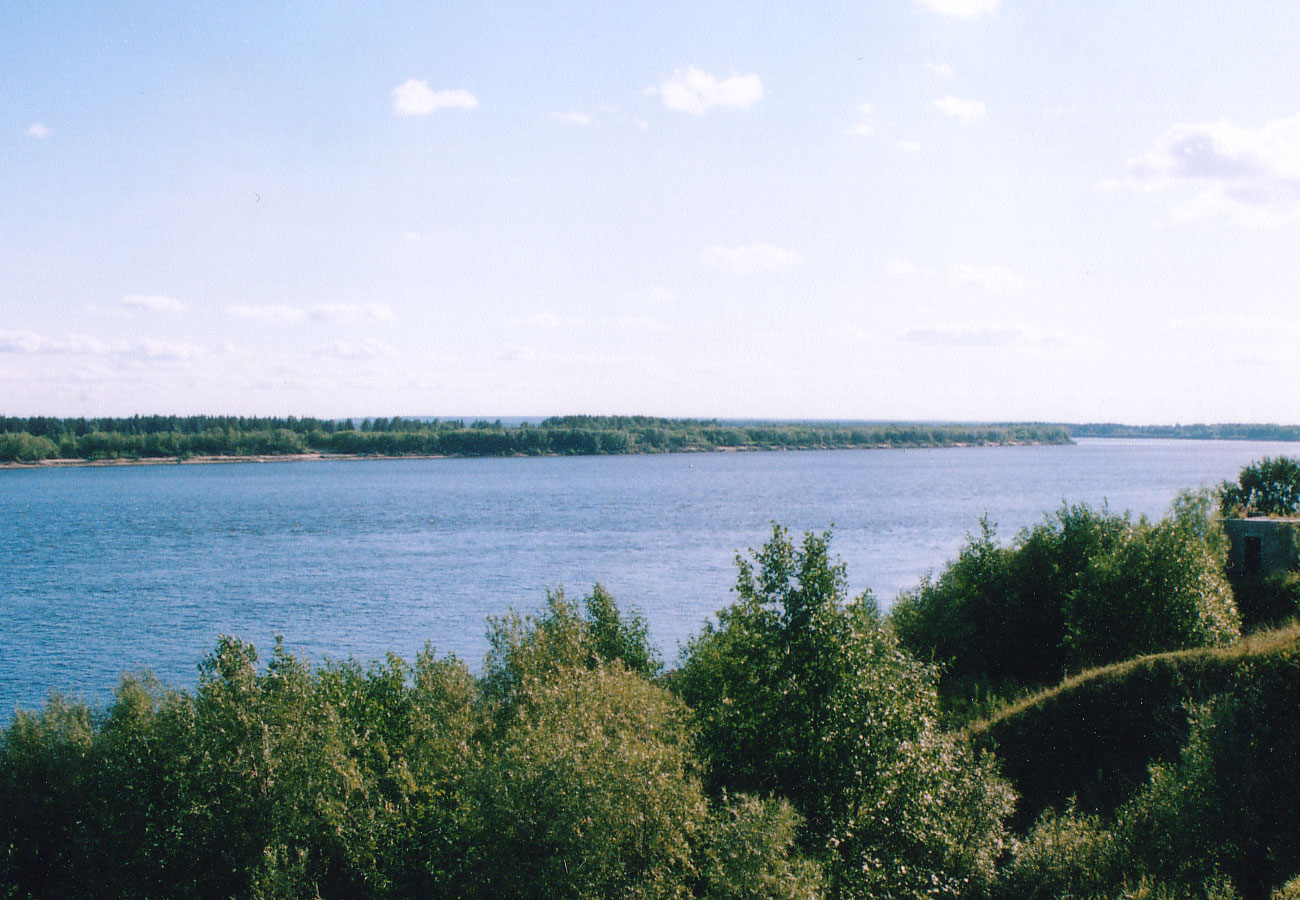
- Vychegda River, near the village of Irta

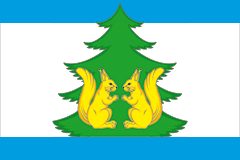
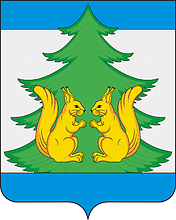
- Flag Coat of arms
- Location of Lensky District in Arkhangelsk Oblast
- Coordinates: 61°33′N 45°56′E
- Country: Russia
- Federal subject: Arkhangelsk Oblast
- Established: June 1, 1924
- Administrative center: Yarensk

Area
  - Total: 10,700 km^{2} (4,100 sq mi)

Population (2010 Census)
  - Total: 13,362
  - Density: 1.25/km^{2} (3.23/sq mi)
  - Urban: 34.3%
  - Rural: 65.7%

Administrative structure
  - Administrative divisions: 1 Urban-type settlements with jurisdictional territory, 9 Selsoviets
  - Inhabited localities: 1 urban-type settlements, 146 rural localities

Municipal structure
  - Municipally incorporated as: Lensky Municipal District
  - Municipal divisions: 1 urban settlements, 3 rural settlements
- Time zone: UTC+3 (MSK)
- OKTMO ID: 11635000
- Website: http://www.yarensk.ru/

Lensky District (Russian: Ле́нский райо́н) is an administrative district (raion), one of the twenty-one in Arkhangelsk Oblast, Russia. As a municipal division, it is incorporated as Lensky Municipal District. It is located in the southeast of the oblast and borders with Udorsky District of the Komi Republic in the north, Syktyvdinsky, Ust-Vymsky, and Sysolsky Districts, also of the Komi Republic, in the east, Vilegodsky District in the south, and with Kotlassky and Krasnoborsky Districts in the west. The area of the district is 10,700 square kilometers (4,100 sq mi). Its administrative center is the rural locality (a selo) of Yarensk. Population: 13,362 (2010 census); 16,071 (2002 census); 20,488 (1989 Soviet census). The population of Yarensk accounts for 27.4% of the district's total population.

== Etymology ==
The name of the district originates from the selo of Lena, which at the formation of the district in 1924 was intended to be the administrative center. While the plans to move the administrative center to Lena had never been realized, the name remained unchanged.

== History ==
The area was populated by speakers of Uralic languages and then colonized by the Novgorod Republic. After the fall of Novgorod, the area became a part of the Grand Duchy of Moscow. Yarensk is first mentioned in the chronicles (as Yerensky Gorodok) in 1374. In 1606, Yarensky Uyezd was formed, and Yarensk became one of the most important towns in the North of Russia.

In the course of the administrative reform carried out in 1708 by Peter the Great, the area was included into Siberia Governorate, and in 1719 transferred to Archangelgorod Governorate. In 1780, the governorate was abolished and transformed into Vologda Viceroyalty. At the same time, Yarensk was granted town rights. In 1918, Yarensky Uyezd was transferred to the newly formed Northern Dvina Governorate, and in 1924 the uyezds were abolished in favor of the new divisions, the districts (raions). Lensky District was formed on June 1, 1924. The idea was to move the administrative center of the district from Yarensk to the selo of Lena, but the logistics came out to be too difficult, and the administration remained in Yarensk.

In the following years, the district remained within the same borders, but the first-level administrative division of Russia kept changing. In 1929, Northern Dvina Governorate was merged into Northern Krai, which in 1936 was transformed into Northern Oblast. In 1937, Northern Oblast was split into Arkhangelsk and Vologda Oblasts. Lensky District remained in Arkhangelsk Oblast ever since.

== Geography ==
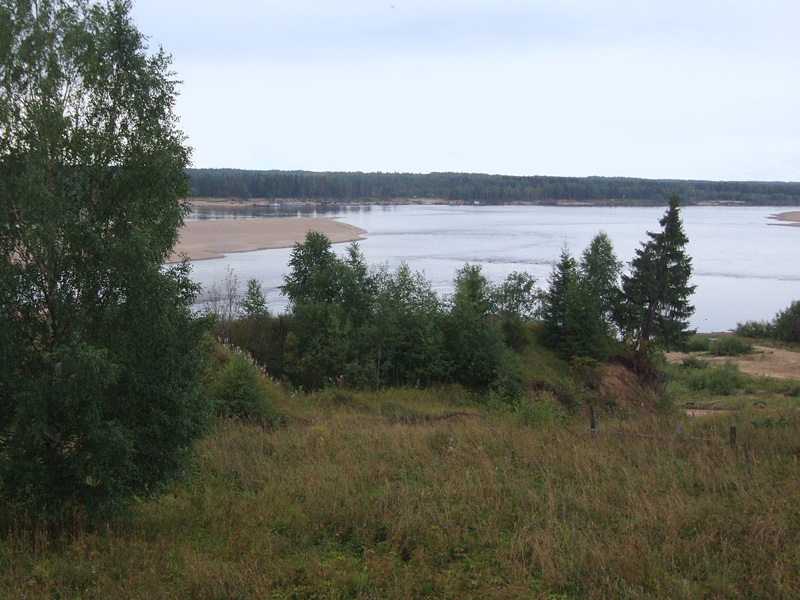
The Vychegda River in the work settlement of Urdoma

The district is located on both banks of the Vychegda and belongs almost exclusively to the basins of the Vychegda and its major tributaries. The main (right-hand) Northern Dvina tributary which flows through the district is the Yarenga. Minor parts of the district belong to the basins of a tributary of the Northern Dvina, the Uftyuga (west), and the Vashka River, a tributary of the Mezen River (northwest). The source of the Pinega is in fact located in Krasnoborsky District. The whole area of the district drains into the White Sea.

Almost the whole of the district is covered by coniferous forests (taiga).

== Divisions ==
=== Administrative divisions ===
As an administrative division, the district is divided into nine selsoviets and one urban-type settlement with jurisdictional territory (Urdoma). The following selsoviets have been established (the administrative centers are given in parentheses):

- Irtovsky (Irta)
- Kozminsky (Kozmino)
- Lensky (Lena)
- Ryabovsky (Ustye)
- Safronovsky (Yarensk)
- Slobodchikovsky (Slobodchikovo)
- Soyginsky (Soyga)
- Sukhodolsky (Bor)
- Tokhtinsky (Lysimo)

=== Municipal divisions ===
As a municipal division, the district is divided into one urban settlement and three rural settlements (the administrative centers are given in parentheses):

- Urdomskoye Urban Settlement (Urdoma)
- Kozminskoye Rural Settlement (Kozmino)
- Safronovskoye Rural Settlement (Yarensk)
- Soyginskoye Rural Settlement (Soyga)

== Economy ==
=== Industry ===
The basis of the economy of the district is timber industry, which in 2007 was responsible for 85% of the district's total industrial production.

=== Transportation ===
The Vychegda is navigable and there is regular passenger navigation downstream from the settlement of Soyga (connecting it to Kotlas).

There is a railway connecting Kotlas and Vorkuta which passes through the district, in particular, through Urdoma, the only urban-type settlement in the district.

Urdoma has an oil-pumping station in the Baltic Pipeline System.

== Culture and recreation ==
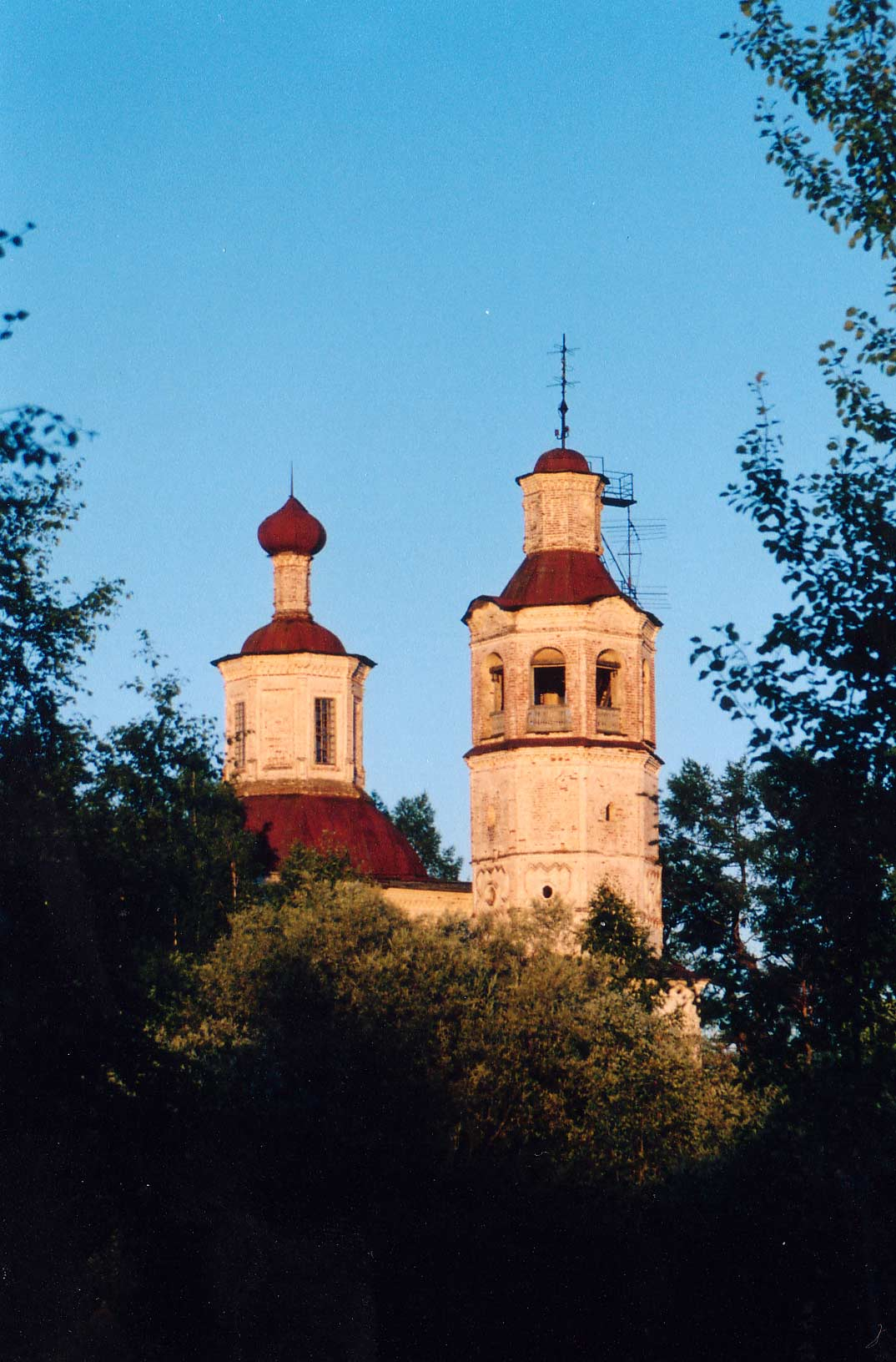
Yarensk, the Transfiguration Cathedral, built between 1745 and 1775

The district contains fifteen objects classified as cultural and historical heritage. Most of these are churches and wooden rural houses built prior to 1917.

The only museum in the district is the Yarensk District Museum.
