= Nikiforovsky (inhabited locality) =

Nikiforovsky (Russian: Никифоровский; masculine), Nikiforovskaya (Никифоровская; feminine), or Nikiforovskoye (Никифоровское; neuter) is the name of several rural localities in Russia:

- Nikiforovsky (rural locality), a settlement in Yaroslavsky Rural Okrug of Yefremovsky District of Tula Oblast
- Nikiforovskoye, Leningrad Oblast, a logging depot settlement under the administrative jurisdiction of Kamennogorskoye Settlement Municipal Formation in Vyborgsky District of Leningrad Oblast
- Nikiforovskoye, Moscow Oblast, a village in Nikolskoye Rural Settlement of Odintsovsky District of Moscow Oblast
- Nikiforovskoye, Ryazan Oblast, a village in Ivanovsky Rural Okrug of Starozhilovsky District of Ryazan Oblast
- Nikiforovskoye, Smolensk Oblast, a village in Saveyevskoye Rural Settlement of Roslavlsky District of Smolensk Oblast
- Nikiforovskoye, Tver Oblast, a village in Stolipinskoye Rural Settlement of Zubtsovsky District of Tver Oblast
- Nikiforovskaya, Kargopolsky District, Arkhangelsk Oblast, a village in Usachevsky Selsoviet of Kargopolsky District of Arkhangelsk Oblast
- Nikiforovskaya, Fedorogorsky Selsoviet, Shenkursky District, Arkhangelsk Oblast, a village in Fedorogorsky Selsoviet of Shenkursky District of Arkhangelsk Oblast
- Nikiforovskaya, Yamskogorsky Selsoviet, Shenkursky District, Arkhangelsk Oblast, a village in Yamskogorsky Selsoviet of Shenkursky District of Arkhangelsk Oblast
- Nikiforovskaya, Tarnogsky District, Vologda Oblast, a village in Verkhnespassky Selsoviet of Tarnogsky District of Vologda Oblast
- Nikiforovskaya, Ust-Kubinsky District, Vologda Oblast, a village in Verkhneramensky Selsoviet of Ust-Kubinsky District of Vologda Oblast
