= Shenkursky =

Shenkursky (masculine), Shenkurskaya (feminine), or Shenkurskoye (neuter) may refer to:

- Shenkursky District, a district of Arkhangelsk Oblast, Russia
- Shenkursky Uyezd, an administrative division in the Russian Empire and the early Russian SFSR; most recently (1796–1929) a part of Arkhangelsk Governorate
- Shenkurskoye Urban Settlement, a municipal formation which the town of district significance of Shenkursk in Shenkursky District of Arkhangelsk Oblast, Russia is incorporated as
