= Boris Stepanovich Lukoshkov =

Russian painter

Boris Stepanovich Lukoshkov Борис Степанович Лукошков
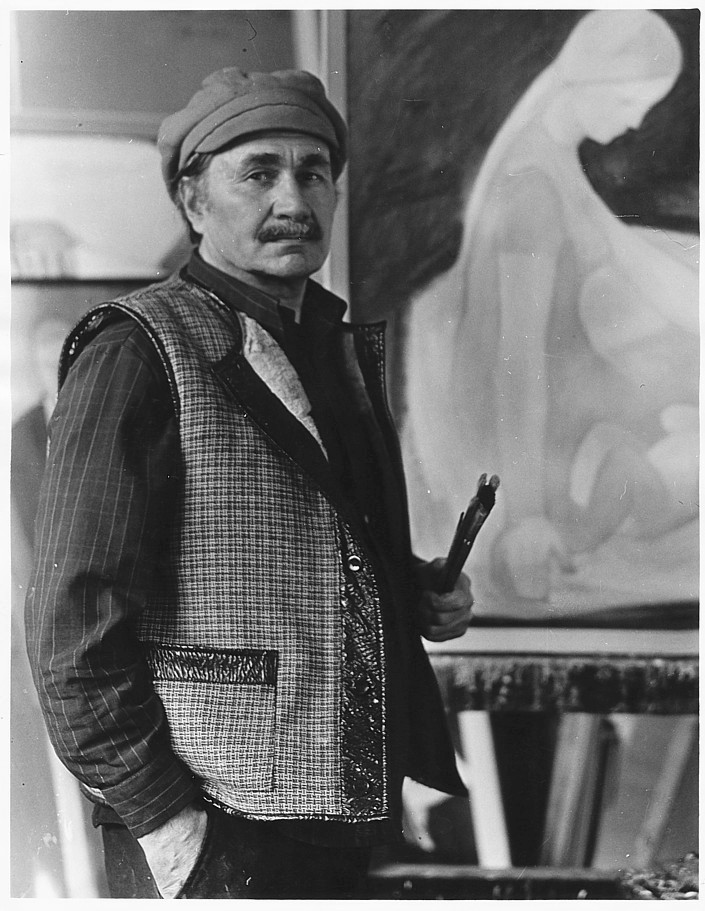
- Born: June 20, 1922; Nyunega, Shenkursky District, Soviet Union
- Died: December 3, 1989 (aged 67); Arkhangelsk
- Known for: painting

Boris Stepanovich Lukoshkov (Russian: Борис Степанович Лукошков; June 20, 1922 – December 3, 1989) was a Russian artist. He was an Honoured Artist of the RSFSR.

== Biography ==
Boris Lukoshkov was born on June 20, 1922, in the village of Nyunega, currently in Shenkursky District of Arkhangelsk Oblast. He dreamed of becoming an artist from childhood. In 1940 he graduated from high school in Shenkursk; in October of the same year he was drafted into the Red Army. He was nineteen when the Great Patriotic War began. On September 13, 1941, while fighting his way out of an encirclement, in street battles in the town of Lokhvitsa, Poltava Oblast in Ukraine, he was critically wounded. He once again joined the army in the fall of 1943. In June 1944, he was wounded again. Severe injuries and their consequences considerably complicated his future activity as an artist.

In 1949 Lukoshkov was admitted to the Leningrad Art College (Tavricheskaya Art School). Upon graduation in 1954, he continued his studies at the Ilya Repin Leningrad Institute of Painting, Sculpture and Architecture (formerly the Imperial Academy of Arts), however, he decided to quit the studies after one year since he was still severely handicapped after the war. Subsequently, he returned to Shenkursk. Due to the fact that he got his education in Leningrad, Boris Lukoshkov is considered as a representative of the Leningrad School of Painting.

Between 1955 and 1957 Boris Lukoshkov worked in Shenkursk. Subsequently, he moved to Arkhangelsk to work in the workshops of the Art Fund and the North-West publishing company. In 1957 he for the first time participated in an art exhibition in Arkhangelsk. In 1965 he joined the Union of Artists of the RSFSR.

In the 1960s, there was growing interest among Soviet artists in linocut. Linocut is characterised by its brevity and dynamism, speed of execution, and decorative effect. G.A. Ryabokon, V.S. Vezhlivtsev and Lukoshkov, all Arkhangelsk artists, began to work in linocut. The subject of the earlier linocuts by Lukoshkov was associated with his hometown, Shenkursk, and neighborhoods. His linocuts are known for their strict elegance and conciseness. In the late 1960s his linocuts were highly praised and were shown at the All-Union (USSR) art exhibition in Moscow in 1967.

By the 1970s Lukoshkov preferred to work with a fine lace mesh of light, casual, or a measured rhythm of light lines in his paintings.

In 1971 he was elected for the first time as a Chairman of the Arkhangelsk Union of Artists (1971–1975, 1979–1983). In 1972 he was a delegate to third Congress of Union of Artists of the RSFSR, and was elected as a member of the Board.

In 1973 he was a delegate to the fourth Congress of Artists of the Soviet Union in Moscow. In 1975 he was awarded the honorary title "Honoured Artist of the RSFSR". In 1976 he was a delegate to the fourth All-Russian Congress of the Union of Artists. In 1981 he was a delegate to the fifth All-Russian Congress of the Union of Artists, Moscow. In 1983 he was a delegate to the sixth All-Russia Union of Artists, Moscow.

Along with linocuts Lukoshkov worked in oil painting, in the traditional realistic style. He created landscapes of villages, fields, sights of the Vaga River, and neighborhoods of Shenkursk. He created his own style of painting the northern landscape.

He died in 1989 in Arkhangelsk, and was buried in a village of Izhma, Primorsky District.

== Exhibitions ==
He participated in the following exhibitions:

- All-Union(USSR) (1962, 1963, 1967, 1969)
- Republican(RSFSR) (1957, 1965, 1967, 1970, 1972, 1975, 1976, 1977, 1980)
- Regional (1964, 1967, 1969, 1974, 1979, 1984)
- Arkhangelk from 1957 to 1989

== Awards ==
Lukoshkov was awarded honorary medals and diplomas of the Ministry of Culture of the RSFSR, the Secretariat of the Union of Artists of the RSFSR, the Komsomol Central Committee, and the Department of Culture Arhoblispolkoma.

He received the following state awards: "Order of the Patriotic War" 1st class, Medal "For Courage", "Medal for Victory over Germany", "20 Years of Victory in Great Patriotic War", "30 years of victory over Nazi Germany", "50 Years of Armed Forces USSR "," 60 years of Soviet Armed Forces ", " For Valiant Labor in commemoration of the 100th anniversary of Vladimir Iljich Lenin."

== Gallery ==
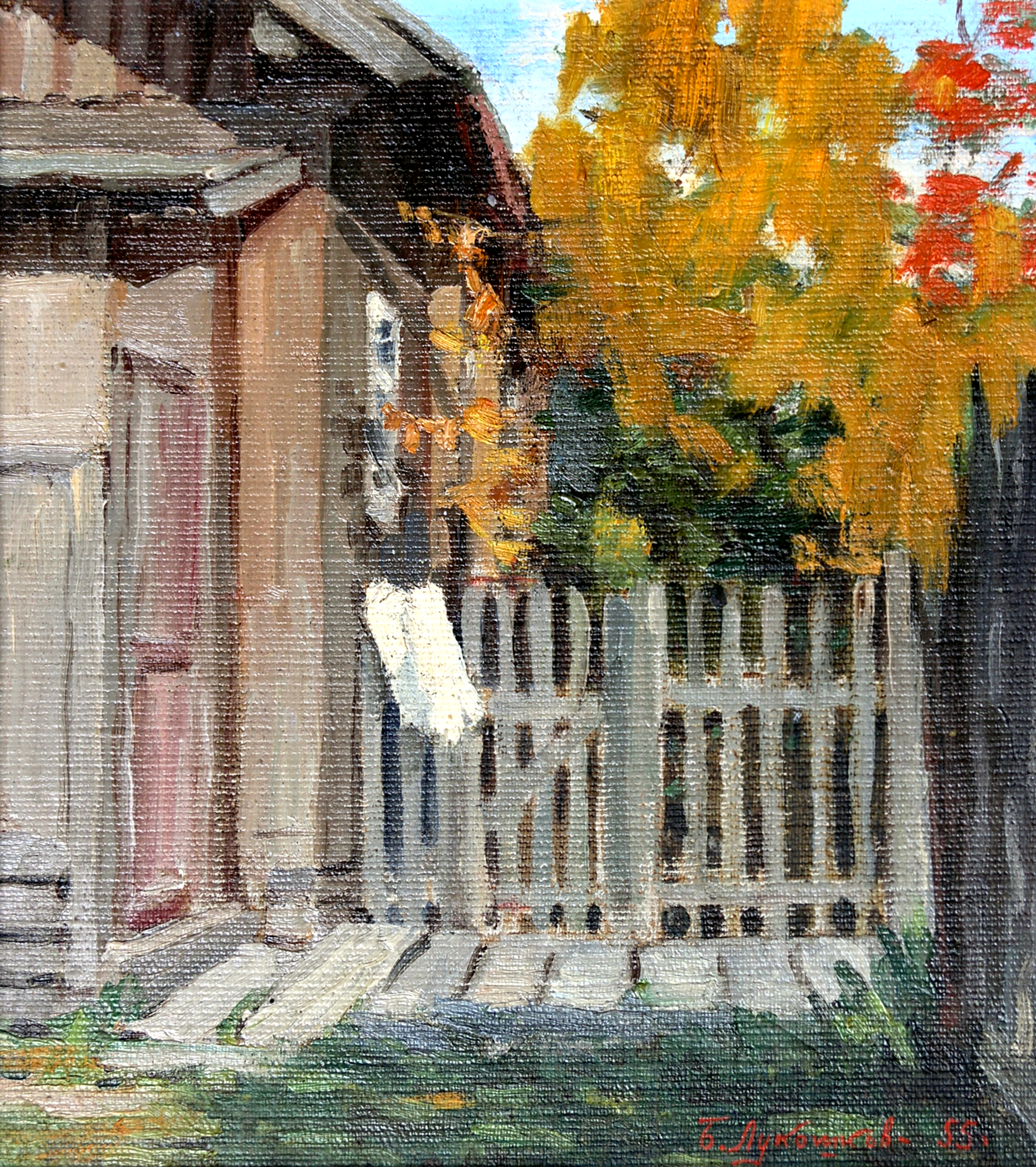
Шенкурский дворик. 1955

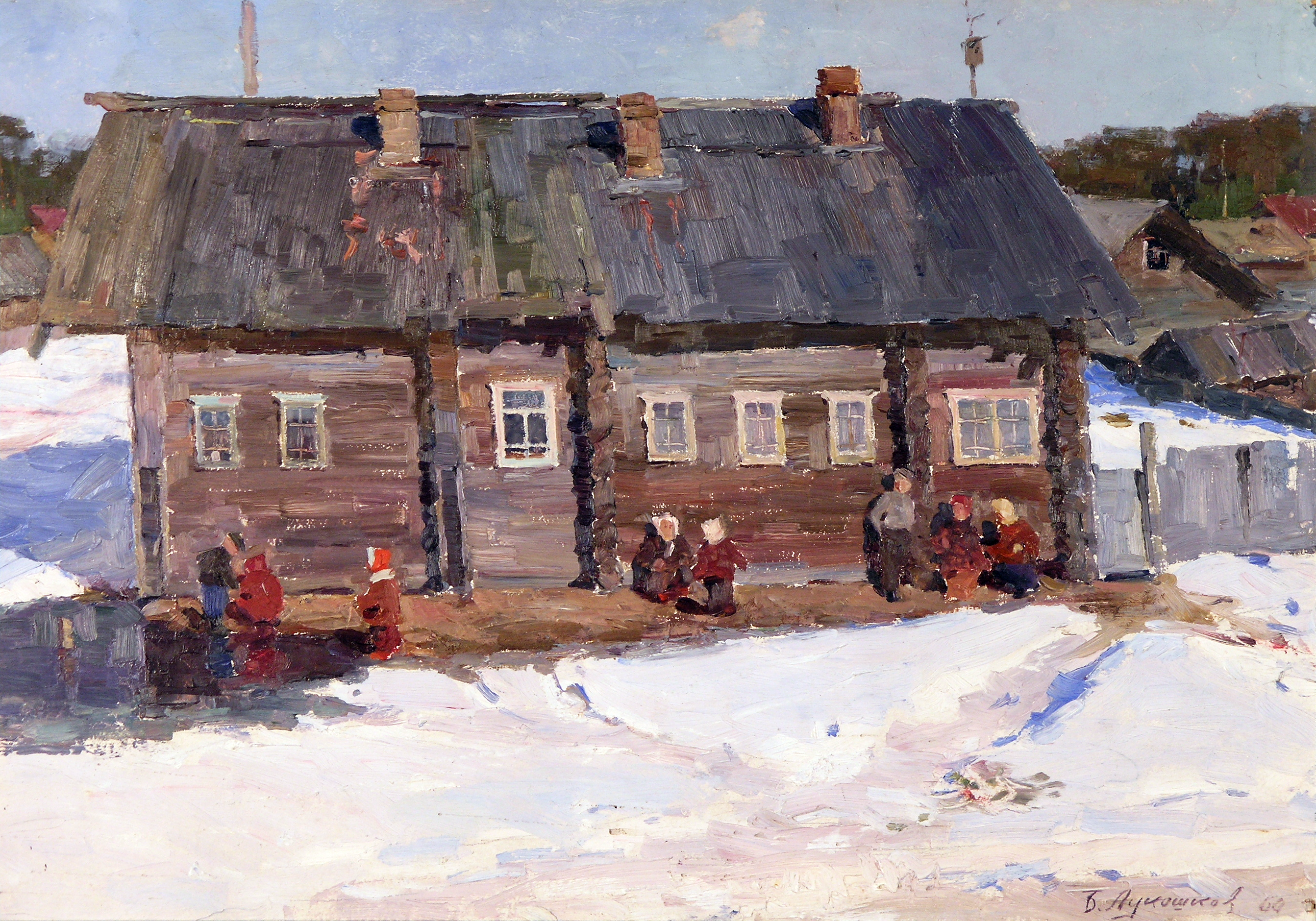
Весна. 1960

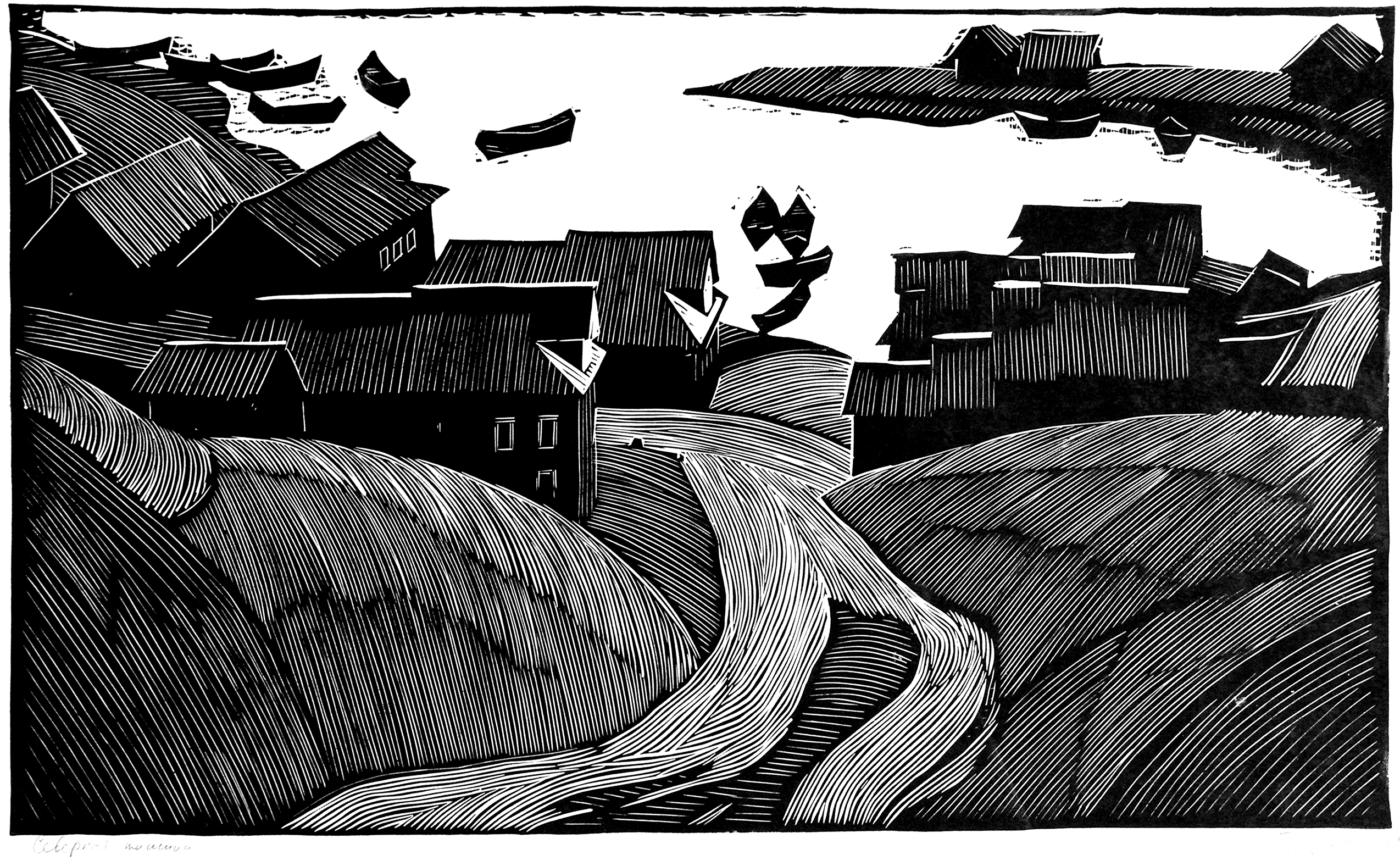
Северная тишина. 1969

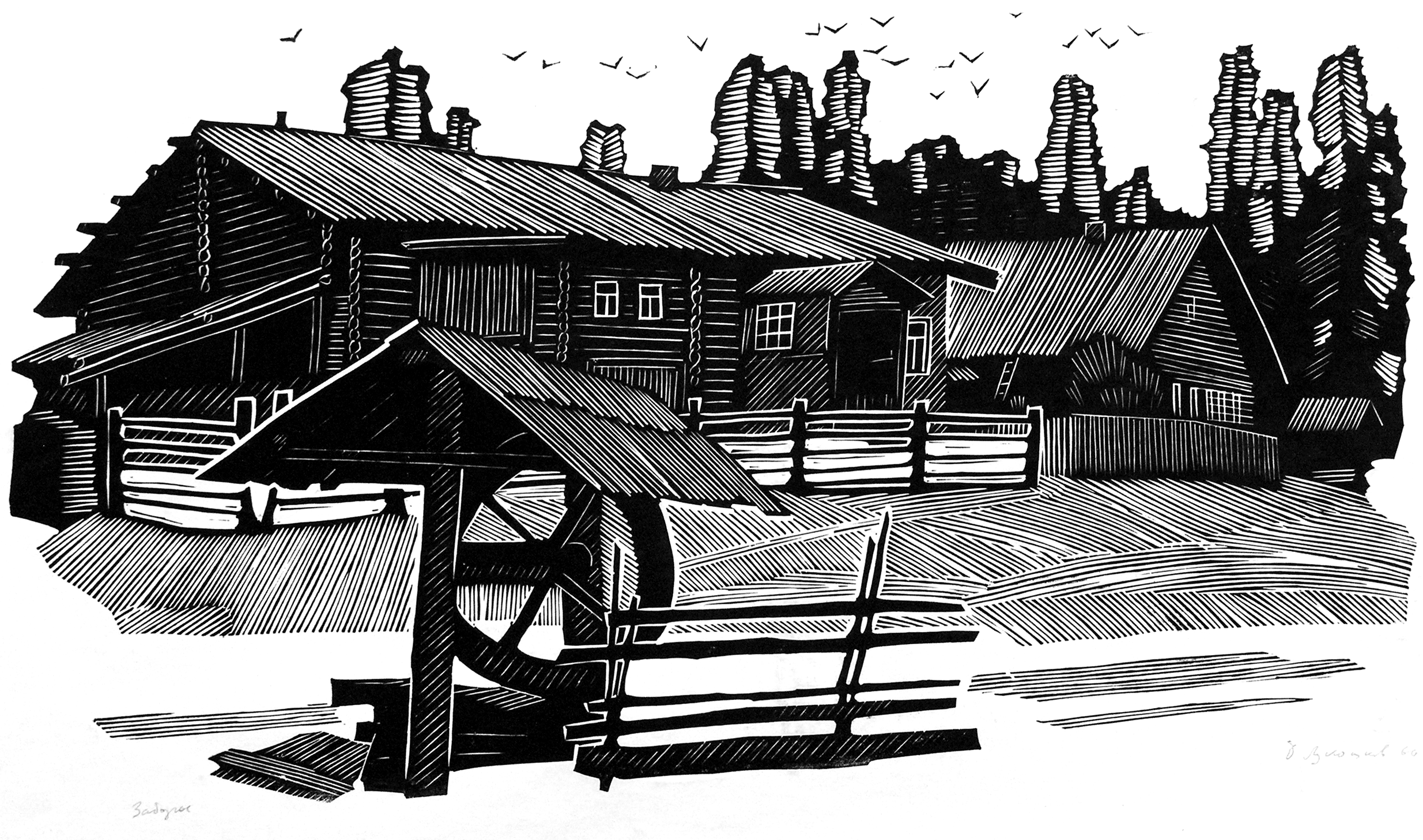
Заборье. 1966

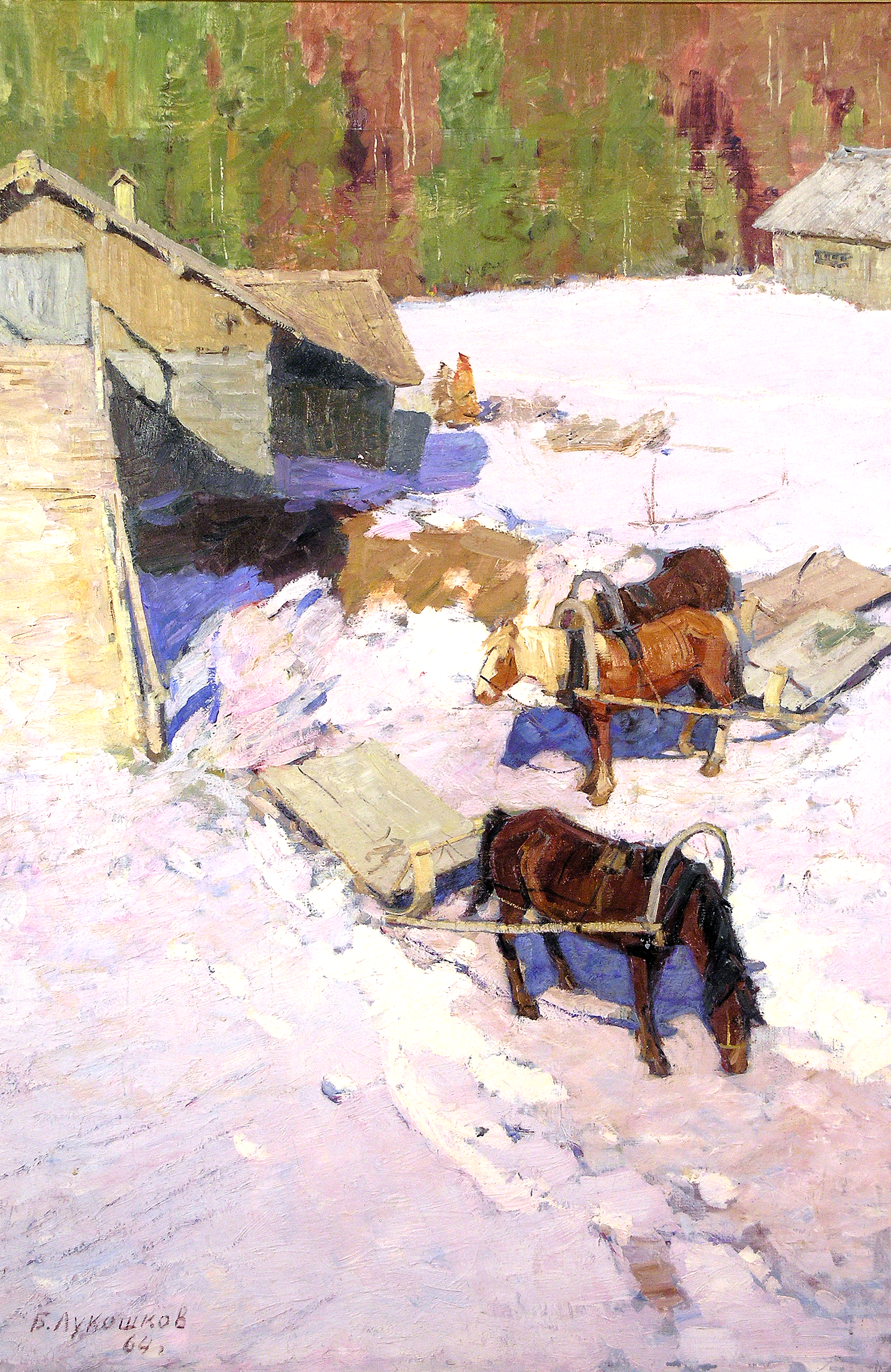
Апрель. 1964

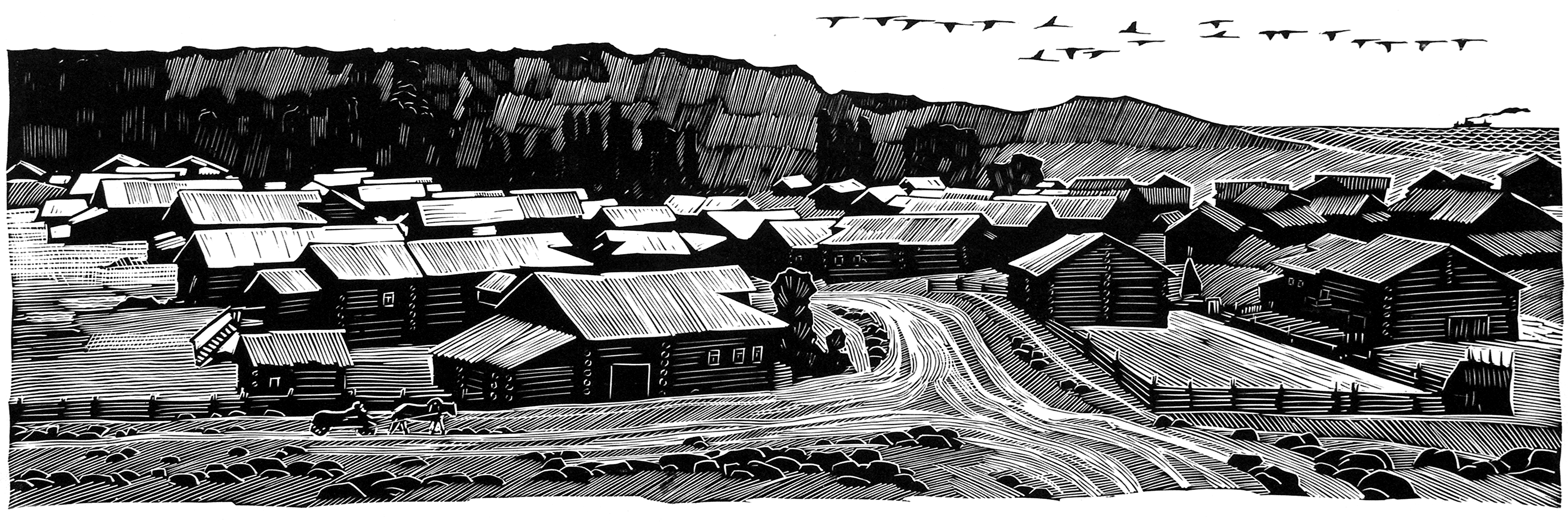
В журавлином краю. 1968

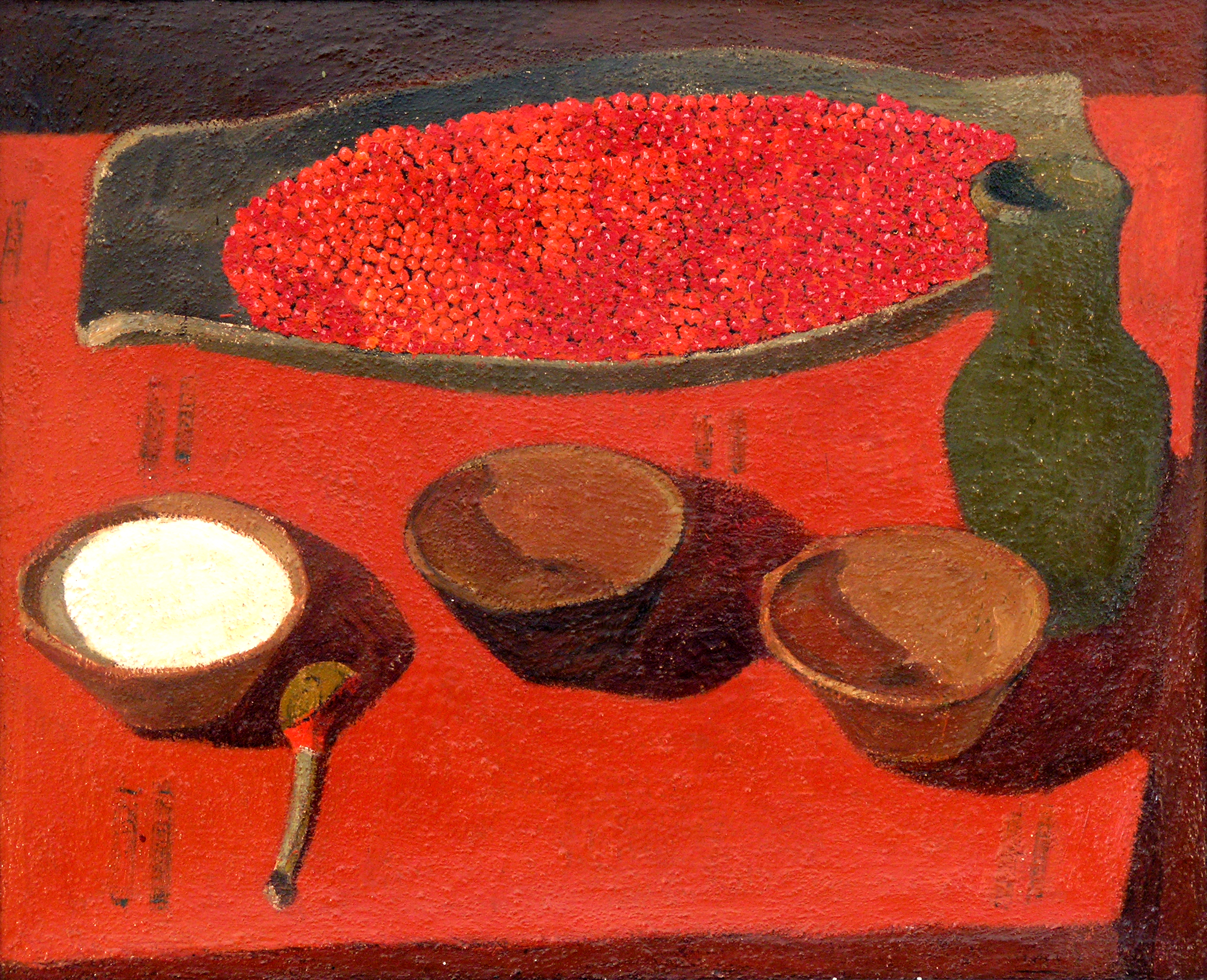
Брусника. 1971

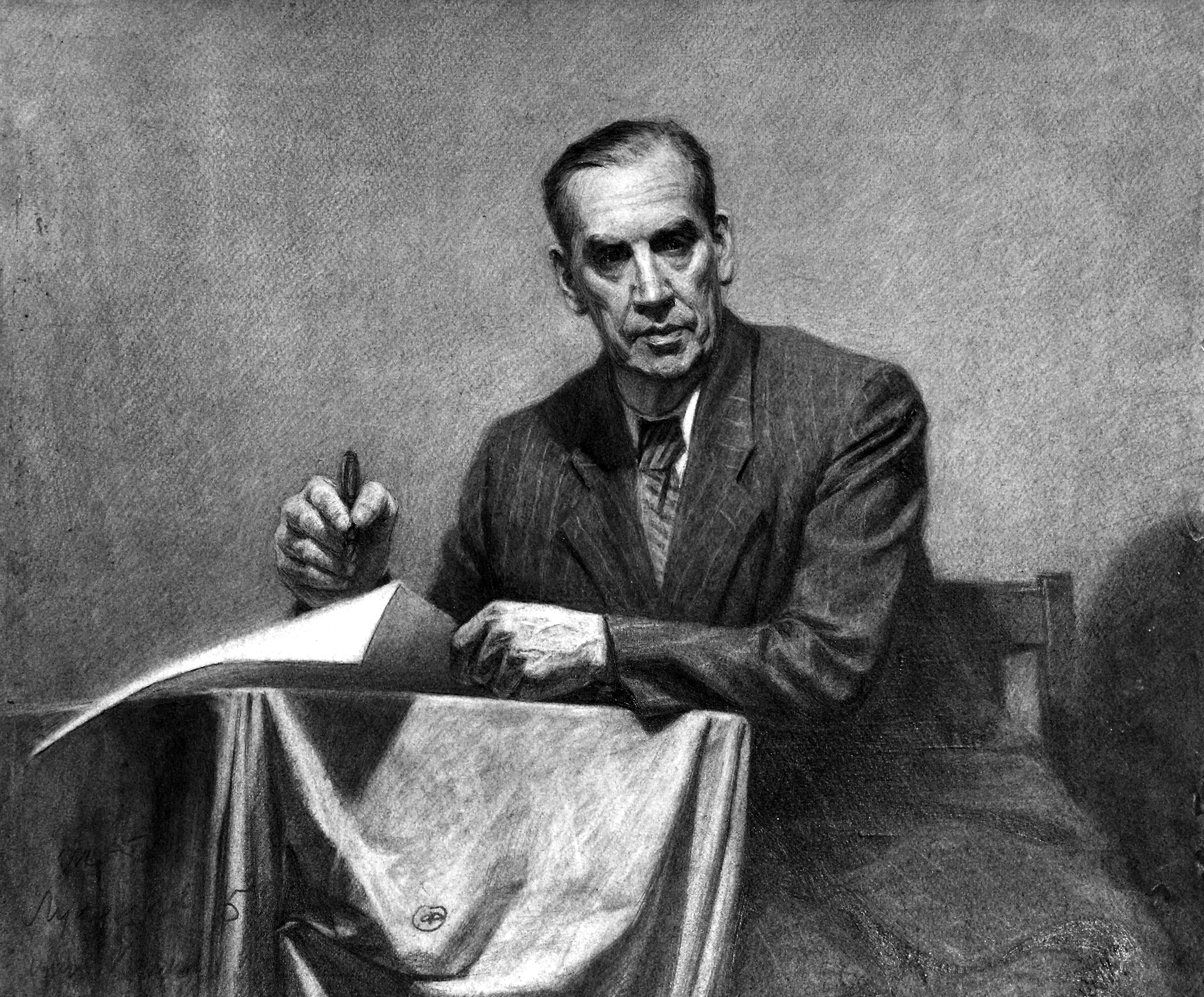
Портрет мужчины за письменным столом. 1950-е

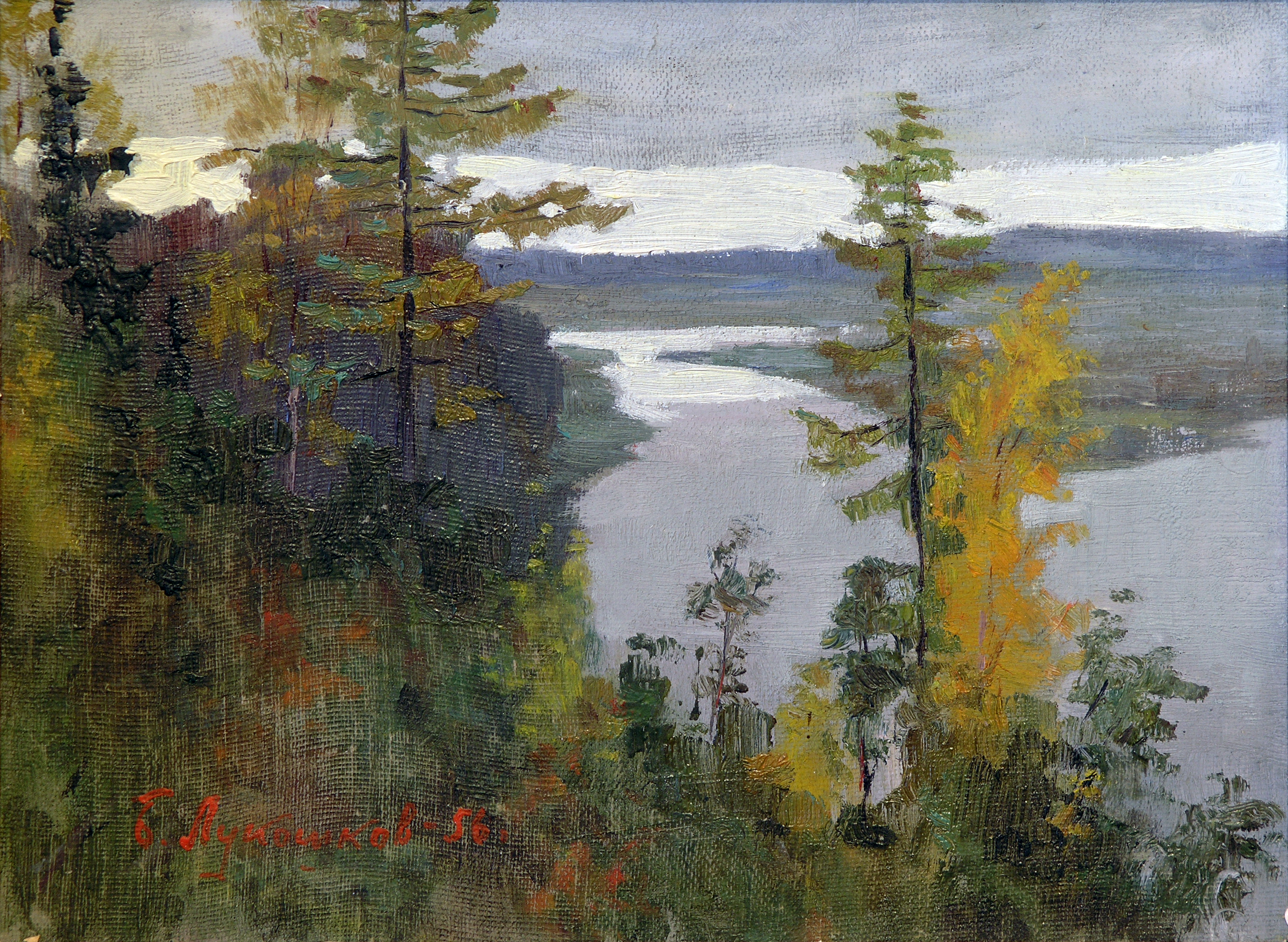
Под Успочей. 1958

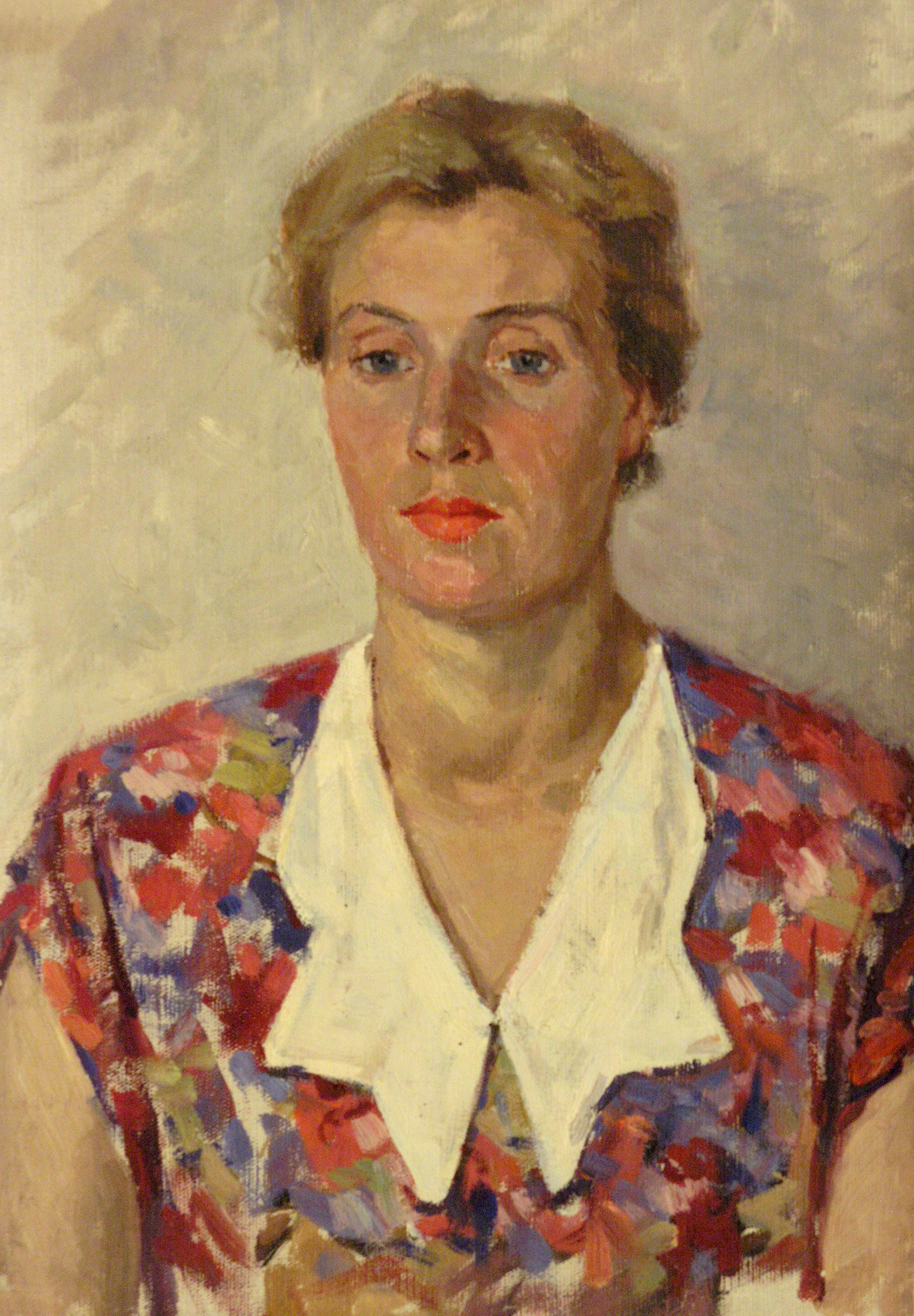
Портрет женщины в цветастом платье. 1950-е

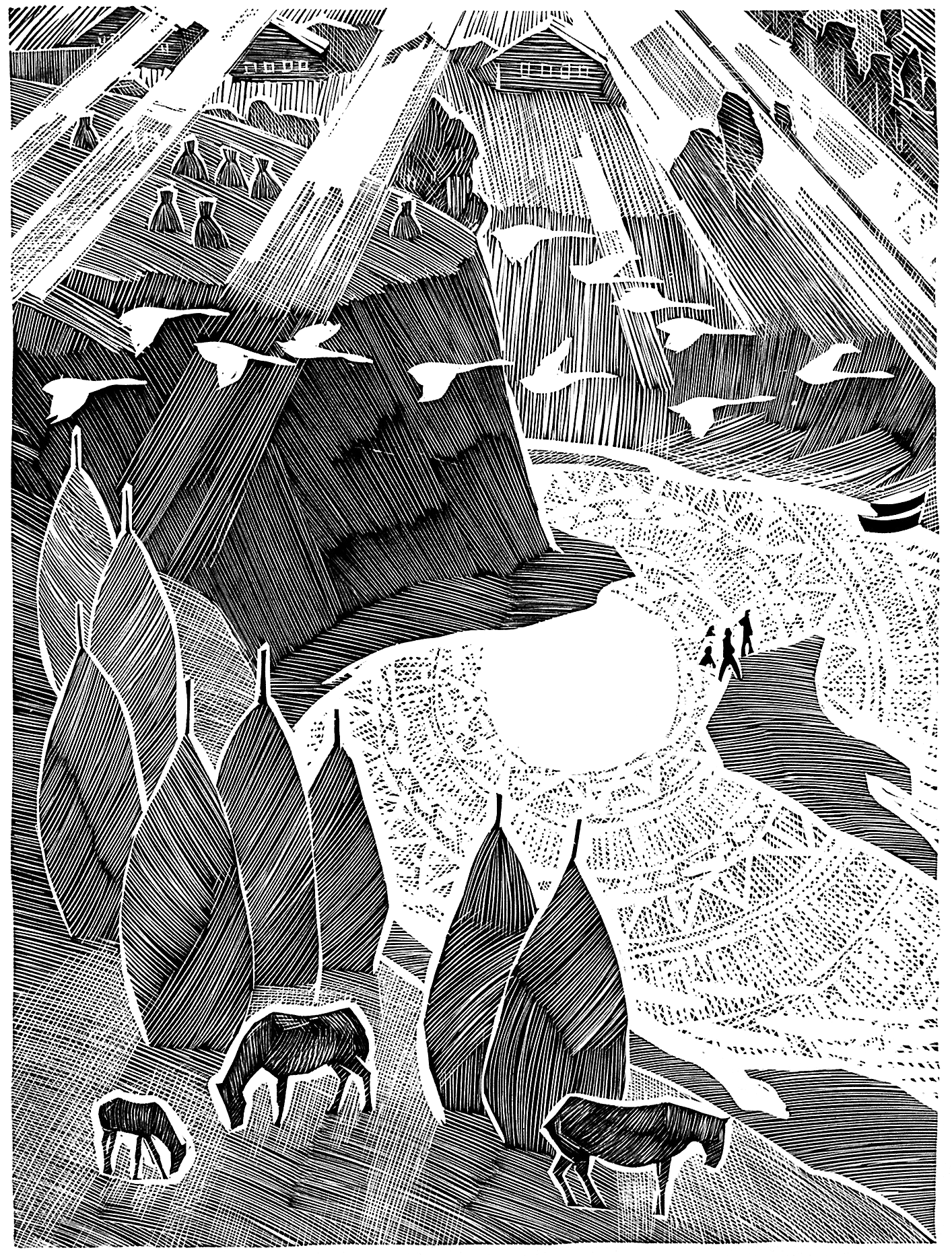
Речка Царева. 1970

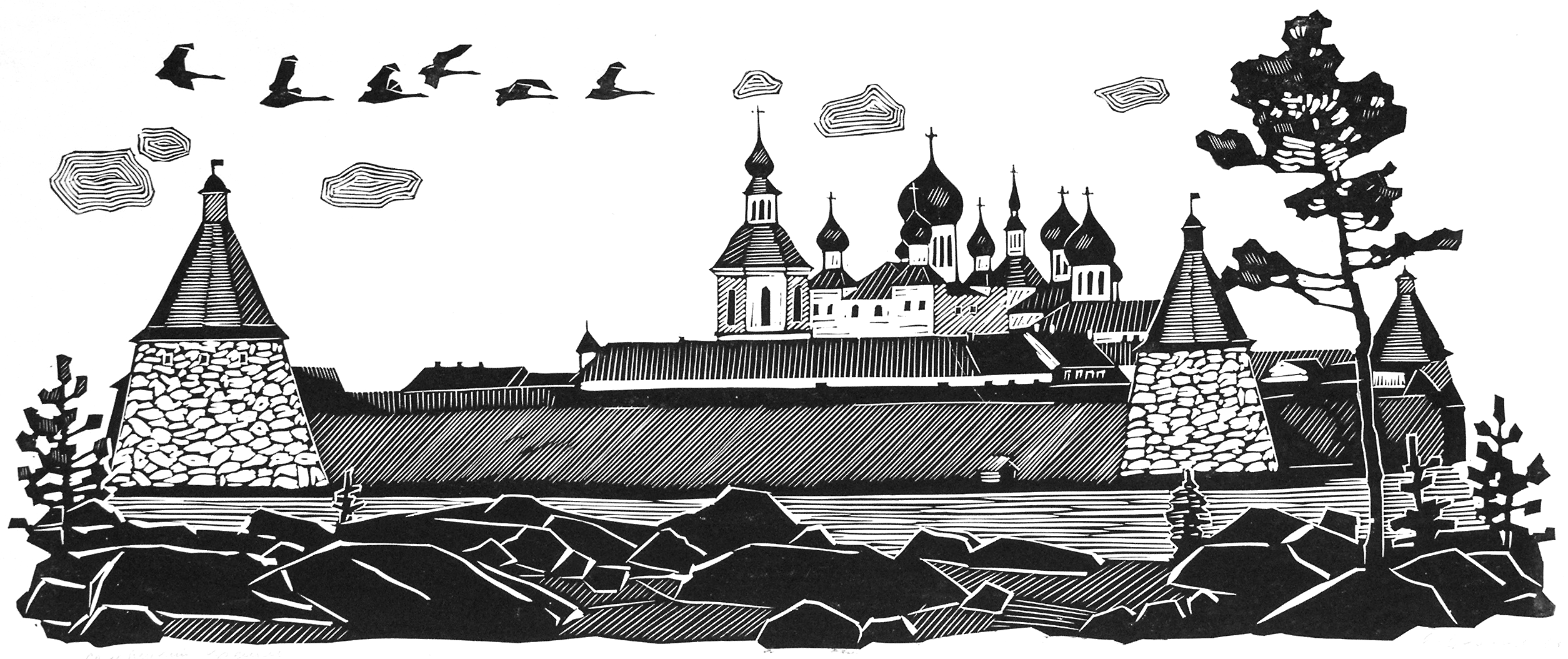
Соловецкий кремль. 1970

== See also ==
- List of 20th-century Russian painters
