= Stepychevskaya =

Stepychevskaya Степычевская
- Village
- Location within Arkhangelsk Oblast Location within Russia
- Coordinates: 62°24′N 42°53′E
- Country: Russia
- Region: Arkhangelsk Oblast
- District: Shenkursky District
- Time zone: UTC+3:00

Stepychevskaya (Russian: Степычевская) is a rural locality (a village) in Shenkursky District, Arkhangelsk Oblast, Russia. The population was 28 as of 2010.

== Geography ==
Stepychevskaya is located on the Vaga River, 49 km north of Shenkursk (the district's administrative centre) by road. Trufanovskaya is the nearest rural locality.
