= Nizhnezolotilovo =

Nizhnezolotilovo Нижнезолотилово
- Village
- Location within Arkhangelsk Oblast Location within Russia
- Coordinates: 62°15′N 42°53′E
- Country: Russia
- Region: Arkhangelsk Oblast
- District: Shenkursky District
- Time zone: UTC+3:00

Nizhnezolotilovo (Russian: Нижнезолотилово) is a rural locality (a village) in Shenkursky District, Arkhangelsk Oblast, Russia. The population was 9 as of 2012.

== Geography ==
Nizhnezolotilovo is located on the Vaga River, 31 km north of Shenkursk (the district's administrative centre) by road. Nikiforovskaya is the nearest rural locality.
