= Shipunovskaya, Arkhangelsk Oblast =

Shipunovskaya Шипуновская
- Village
- Location within Arkhangelsk Oblast Location within Russia
- Coordinates: 62°06′N 42°47′E
- Country: Russia
- Region: Arkhangelsk Oblast
- District: Shenkursky District
- Time zone: UTC+3:00

Shipunovskaya (Russian: Шипуновская) is a rural locality (a village) in Shenkursky District, Arkhangelsk Oblast, Russia. The population was 531 as of 2010. There are 7 streets.

== Geography ==
Shipunovskaya is located 9 km west from Shenkursk (the district's administrative centre) by road. Vyselok Frushinsky is the nearest rural locality.
