= Chashchinskaya =

Chashchinskaya Чащинская
- Village
- Location within Arkhangelsk Oblast Location within Russia
- Coordinates: 62°06′N 42°49′E
- Country: Russia
- Region: Arkhangelsk Oblast
- District: Shenkursky District
- Time zone: UTC+3:00

Chashchinskaya (Russian: Чащинская) is a rural locality (a village) in Nikolskoye Rural Settlement of Shenkursky District, Arkhangelsk Oblast, Russia. The population was 80 as of 2010. There is 1 street.

== Geography ==
Chashchinskaya is located 7 km west of Shenkursk (the district's administrative centre) by road. Shipunovskaya is the nearest rural locality.
