= Rybogorskaya =

Rybogorskaya Рыбогорская
- Village
- Location within Arkhangelsk Oblast Location within Russia
- Coordinates: 62°05′N 42°21′E
- Country: Russia
- Region: Arkhangelsk Oblast
- District: Shenkursky District
- Time zone: UTC+3:00

Rybogorskaya (Russian: Рыбогорская) is a rural locality (a village) in Shenkursky District, Arkhangelsk Oblast, Russia. The population was 76 as of 2010.

== Geography ==
Rybogorskaya is located on the Tarnya River, 42 km west of Shenkursk (the district's administrative centre) by road. Ivanovskaya is the nearest rural locality.
