= Kameshnik =

Kameshnik Камешник
- Village
- Location within Arkhangelsk Oblast Location within Russia
- Coordinates: 61°46′N 42°14′E
- Country: Russia
- Region: Arkhangelsk Oblast
- District: Shenkursky District
- Time zone: UTC+3:00

Kameshnik (Russian: Камешник) is a rural locality (a village) in Rovdinskoye Rural Settlement of Shenkursky District, Arkhangelsk Oblast, Russia. The population was 26 as of 2010.

== Geography ==
It is located on the Sulanda River, 73 km southwest of Shenkursk (the district's administrative centre) by road. Ushakovskoye is the nearest rural locality.
