= Nosovskaya =

Nosovskaya (Russian: Носовская) is the name of several rural localities in Russia:

- Nosovskaya, Rovdinsky Selsoviet, Shenkursky District, Arkhangelsk Oblast, a village in Rovdinsky Selsoviet of Shenkursky District, Arkhangelsk Oblast
- Nosovskaya, Fedorogorsky Selsoviet, Shenkursky District, Arkhangelsk Oblast, a village in Fedorogorsky Selsoviet of Shenkursky District, Arkhangelsk Oblast
