= Odintsovskaya =

Odintsovskaya Одинцовская
- Village
- Location within Arkhangelsk Oblast Location within Russia
- Coordinates: 62°15′N 42°49′E
- Country: Russia
- Region: Arkhangelsk Oblast
- District: Shenkursky District
- Time zone: UTC+3:00

Odintsovskaya (Russian: Одинцовская) is a rural locality (a village) in Shenkursky District, Arkhangelsk Oblast, Russia. The population was 218 as of 2010.

== Geography ==
Odintsovskaya is located on the Led River, 29 km north of Shenkursk (the district's administrative centre) by road. Fedkovskaya is the nearest rural locality.
