= Odintsovsky =

Odintsovsky (masculine), Odintsovskaya (feminine), or Odintsovskoye (neuter) may refer to:

- Odintsovsky District, a district of Moscow Oblast, Russia
- Odintsovsky (rural locality), a rural locality (a khutor) in Odintsovsky District of Moscow Oblast, Russia
- Odintsovskaya, a rural locality (a village) in Arkhangelsk Oblast, Russia
