= Rovdino, Arkhangelsk Oblast =

Rovdino Ровдино
- Selo
- Location within Arkhangelsk Oblast Location within Russia
- Coordinates: 61°41′N 42°32′E
- Country: Russia
- Region: Arkhangelsk Oblast
- District: Shenkursky District
- Time zone: UTC+3:00

Rovdino (Russian: Ровдино) is a rural locality (a selo) in Fedorogorskoye Rural Settlement of Shenkursky District, Arkhangelsk Oblast, Russia. The population was 976 as of 2010. There are 14 streets.

== Geography ==
Rovdino is located 61 km south of Shenkursk (the district's administrative centre) by road. Filippovskaya is the nearest rural locality.
