= Nikiforovsky =

Nikiforovsky (masculine), Nikiforovskaya (feminine), or Nikiforovskoye (neuter) may refer to:

- Nikiforovsky District, a district of Tambov Oblast, Russia
- Nikiforovsky (inhabited locality) (Nikiforovskaya, Nikiforovskoye), several rural localities in Russia
