= Tavricheskaya Art School =

Art school in Saint Petersburg, Russia

Tavricheskaya Art School (Russian: Таври́ческое худо́жественно-педагоги́ческое учи́лище) is a secondary art school in Saint Petersburg (formerly Leningrad). This was the informal name of the art school.

From 1919 to 1961, it was located in a building at Tavricheskaya Street, Leningrad 35. From 1930 to 1950, Tavricheskaya Art School played an important role in the preparation of Leningrad artists and the formation of the Leningrad school of painting. In the 20th century, the Tavricheskaya Art School repeatedly altered its official name and address. Since 1992 the art school, which had been called the N.K. Roerich St. Petersburg Art School, was renamed after Nicholas Roerich.

== History ==
The history of the Tavricheskaya Art School dates back to 1839 when the Drawing School opened in the building of Saint Petersburg Customs. In 1858 the Drawing School transferred to the "Imperial Society for the Encouragement of the Arts". In 1878 the Drawing School moved to Bolshaya Morskaya Street, Leningrad 38. Nicholas Roerich headed the establishment from 1906 to 1918. At different times its teaching staff included such artists and teachers as Ivan Kramskoy, Pavel Chistyakov, Leon Benois.

Following the 1917 October Revolution, in July 1918, by the initiative of the People's Commissar of Education Anatoli Lunacharsky, the Art School resumed as free "Courses of Drawing" relocated at Liteyny Prospect. At the end of 1918, its courses were converted to "Art School and Workshop". In July 1919, the school moved to Tavricheskaya Street, Leningrad 35, which later gave the school its unofficial name: "Tavricheskaya Art School". Here the Art School remained until 1961. Its official name changed several times: "Art and Industrial College", "Art and Pedagogical College", "The Leningrad Art School".

In the years 1930–1950, the sghool's director, Jan Konstantinovich Shablovsky, played a role in consolidating the Tavricheskaya Art School. Graduates from this period included the future artists Alexander Semionov, Lev Russov, Valery Vatenin, Nina Veselova, Piotr Litvinsky, Maria Rudnitskaya, Galina Rumiantseva, Ivan Varichev, Vladimir Galba, Orest Vereysky, Vasily Golubev, Kapitolina Rumiantseva, Yuri Tulin, and others.

In 1943, following the partial lifting of the Wehrmacht blockade of Leningrad, the Tavricheskaya Art School became the first art school of Leningrad to resume its work. In 1943–1944, there were engaged in and students of the Leningrad Institute of Painting, Sculpture and Architecture, which remained in the besieged city.

In 1961 the Tavricheskaya Art School moved to a mansion at Proletarian Dictatorship street, Leningrad 5. In 1968 the Supreme Soviet of the USSR awarded the Leningrad Art School the name of Soviet artist and teacher Vladimir Alexandrovich Serov, President of USSR Academy of Arts, who for several years headed the State Qualification Commission.

In 1989 the school relocated to a new building at Grazhdansky Prospekt, 88, and in 1992 became known as the "Nicholas Roerich Saint Petersburg Art School". Training takes place in the departments of painting, sculpture, design, and restoration.

== Alumni ==
- Anatoly Yagudaev (1935–2014)
- Evgenia Baykova (1907–1998)
- Vasily Golubev (1925–1985)
- Engels Kozlov (1926–2007)
- Piotr Litvinsky (1927–2009)
- Boris Lukoshkov (1922–1989)
- Maria Rudnitskaya (1916–1983)
- Galina Rumiantseva (1927–2004)
- Kapitolina Rumiantseva (1925–2002)
- Lev Russov (1926–1988)
- Alexander Semionov (1922–1984)
- Yuri Tulin (1921–1986)
- Ivan Varichev (born 1924)
- Valery Vatenin (1933–1977)
- Nina Veselova (1922–1960)
