= Nosovskaya, Fedorogorsky Selsoviet, Shenkursky District, Arkhangelsk Oblast =

Nosovskaya Носовская
- Village
- Location within Arkhangelsk Oblast Location within Russia
- Coordinates: 61°54′N 43°43′E
- Country: Russia
- Region: Arkhangelsk Oblast
- District: Shenkursky District
- Time zone: UTC+3:00

Nosovskaya (Russian: Носовская) is a rural locality (a village) in Fedorogorskoye Rural Settlement of Shenkursky District, Arkhangelsk Oblast, Russia. The population was 3 as of 2010.

== Geography ==
It is located on the Kodima River.
