= Nikiforovskaya, Fedorogorsky Selsoviet, Shenkursky District, Arkhangelsk Oblast =

Nikiforovskaya Никифоровская
- Village
- Location within Arkhangelsk Oblast Location within Russia
- Coordinates: 62°06′N 42°59′E
- Country: Russia
- Region: Arkhangelsk Oblast
- District: Shenkursky District
- Time zone: UTC+3:00

Nikiforovskaya (Russian: Никифоровская) is a rural locality (a village) and the administrative center of Fedorogorskoye Rural Settlement of Shenkursky District, Arkhangelsk Oblast, Russia. The population was 687 as of 2010. There are 14 streets.

== Geography ==
It is located 3 km east from Shenkursk.
