= Nosovskaya, Rovdinsky Selsoviet, Shenkursky District, Arkhangelsk Oblast =

Nosovskaya Носовская
- Village
- Location within Arkhangelsk Oblast Location within Russia
- Coordinates: 61°40′N 42°30′E
- Country: Russia
- Region: Arkhangelsk Oblast
- District: Shenkursky District
- Time zone: UTC+3:00

Nosovskaya (Russian: Носовская) is a rural locality (a village) in Rovdinskoye Rural Settlement of Shenkursky District, Arkhangelsk Oblast, Russia. The population was 9 as of 2010. There are 3 streets.

== Geography ==
It is located on the Puya River, 51 km south-west from Shenkursk.
