= Nikiforovskaya, Tarnogsky District, Vologda Oblast =

Nikiforovskaya Никифоровская
- Village
- Location within Vologda Oblast Location within Russia
- Coordinates: 60°39′N 43°12′E
- Country: Russia
- Region: Vologda Oblast
- District: Tarnogsky District
- Time zone: UTC+3:00

Nikiforovskaya (Russian: Никифоровская) is a rural locality (a village) and the administrative center of Spasskoye Rural Settlement, Tarnogsky District, Vologda Oblast, Russia. The population was 150 as of 2002.

== Geography ==
Nikiforovskaya is located 31 km northwest of Tarnogsky Gorodok (the district's administrative centre) by road. Bashevskaya is the nearest rural locality.
