= Nikiforovskaya, Ust-Kubinsky District, Vologda Oblast =

Nikiforovskaya Никифоровская
- Village
- Location within Vologda Oblast Location within Russia
- Coordinates: 60°07′N 39°20′E
- Country: Russia
- Region: Vologda Oblast
- District: Ust-Kubinsky District
- Time zone: UTC+3:00

Nikiforovskaya (Russian: Никифоровская) is a rural locality (a village) in Bogorodskoye Rural Settlement, Ust-Kubinsky District, Vologda Oblast, Russia. The population was 38 as of 2002. There are 2 streets.

== Geography ==
Nikiforovskaya is located 66 km northwest of Ustye (the district's administrative centre) by road. Senskaya is the nearest rural locality.
