= Shenkursky Uyezd =

Subdivision of the Russian Empire

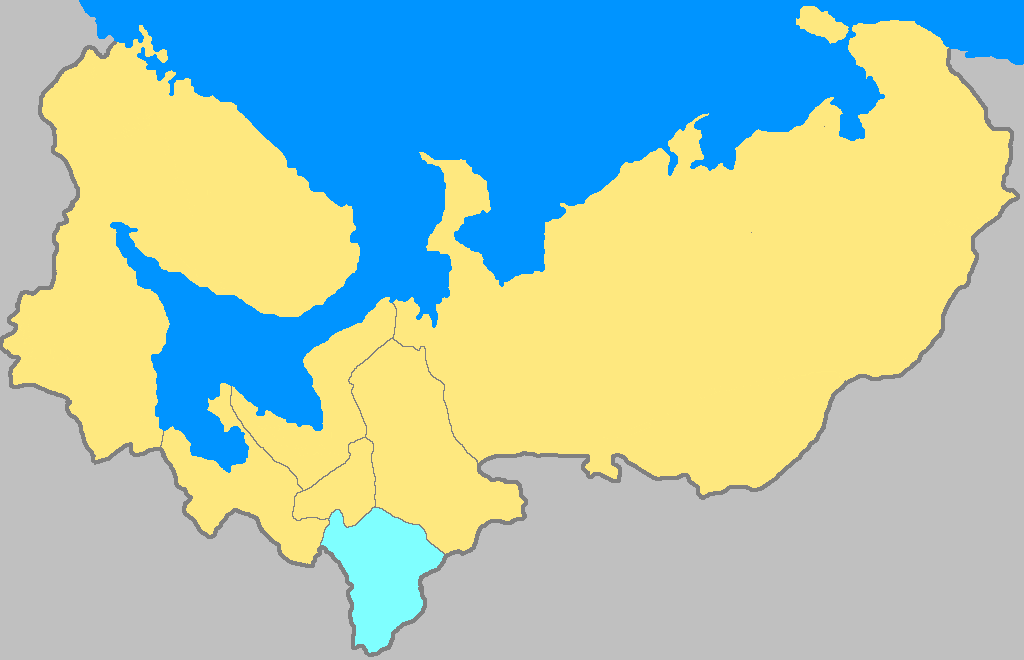
Map of Arkhangelsk Governorate with Shenkursky Uyezd in light blue

Shenkursky Uyezd (Шенкурский уезд) was one of the subdivisions of the Arkhangelsk Governorate of the Russian Empire. It was situated in the southern part of the governorate. Its administrative centre was Shenkursk.

== Demographics ==
At the time of the Russian Empire Census of 1897, Shenkursky Uyezd had a population of 76,759. Of these, 99.6% spoke Russian, 0.3% Belarusian and 0.1% Romani as their native language.
