= Shenkursk =

Town in Arkhangelsk Oblast, Russia

Shenkursk Шенкурск
- Town
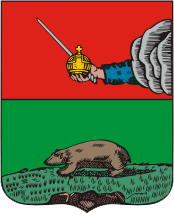
- Coat of arms
- Interactive map of Shenkursk
- Location of Shenkursk Shenkursk (Arkhangelsk Oblast)
- Coordinates: 62°06′N 42°54′E
- Country: Russia
- Federal subject: Arkhangelsk Oblast
- Administrative district: Shenkursky District
- Town of district significanceSelsoviet: Shenkursk
- First mentioned: 1229
- Town status since: 1780
- Elevation: 60 m (200 ft)

Population (2010 Census)
  - Total: 5,702
  - Estimate (2023): 4,524 (−20.7%)

Administrative status
  - Capital of: Shenkursky District, town of district significance of Shenkursk

Municipal status
  - Municipal district: Shenkursky Municipal District
  - Urban settlement: Shenkurskoye Urban Settlement
  - Capital of: Shenkursky Municipal District, Shenkurskoye Urban Settlement
- Time zone: UTC+3 (MSK)
- Postal code: 165160
- OKTMO ID: 11658101001

Shenkursk (Russian: Шенку́рск) is a town and the administrative center of Shenkursky District in Arkhangelsk Oblast, Russia, located on the right bank of the Vaga River. Population: 4,608 (2021 census); 5,702 (2010 census); 6,151 (2002 census); 7,424 (1989 Soviet census).

== Geography ==
=== Climate ===
Climate data for Shenkursk
Month	Jan	Feb	Mar	Apr	May	Jun	Jul	Aug	Sep	Oct	Nov	Dec	Year
Record high °C (°F)	3.5 (38.3)	5.0 (41.0)	13.6 (56.5)	26.0 (78.8)	31.0 (87.8)	35.6 (96.1)	34.9 (94.8)	35.7 (96.3)	28.6 (83.5)	20.6 (69.1)	12.7 (54.9)	5.9 (42.6)	35.7 (96.3)
Mean daily maximum °C (°F)	−9.2 (15.4)	−7.0 (19.4)	−0.2 (31.6)	7.5 (45.5)	15.3 (59.5)	20.9 (69.6)	23.7 (74.7)	19.7 (67.5)	13.1 (55.6)	5.4 (41.7)	−2.4 (27.7)	−6.4 (20.5)	6.7 (44.1)
Daily mean °C (°F)	−12.9 (8.8)	−10.9 (12.4)	−4.8 (23.4)	2.8 (37.0)	9.8 (49.6)	15.3 (59.5)	18.3 (64.9)	15.0 (59.0)	9.4 (48.9)	3.0 (37.4)	−4.8 (23.4)	−9.6 (14.7)	2.6 (36.7)
Mean daily minimum °C (°F)	−16.5 (2.3)	−14.7 (5.5)	−9.3 (15.3)	−2.0 (28.4)	4.3 (39.7)	9.8 (49.6)	12.8 (55.0)	10.2 (50.4)	5.7 (42.3)	0.5 (32.9)	−7.3 (18.9)	−12.9 (8.8)	−1.6 (29.1)
Record low °C (°F)	−45.5 (−49.9)	−40.5 (−40.9)	−36.7 (−34.1)	−27.1 (−16.8)	−7.4 (18.7)	−1.8 (28.8)	2.9 (37.2)	−0.6 (30.9)	−6.6 (20.1)	−17.2 (1.0)	−35.9 (−32.6)	−40.7 (−41.3)	−45.5 (−49.9)
Average precipitation mm (inches)	34.0 (1.34)	27.5 (1.08)	25.6 (1.01)	37.8 (1.49)	48.1 (1.89)	58.0 (2.28)	68.1 (2.68)	75.1 (2.96)	51.7 (2.04)	51.5 (2.03)	43.7 (1.72)	40.4 (1.59)	561.5 (22.11)
Source: Weather and climate in Shenkursk

== History ==
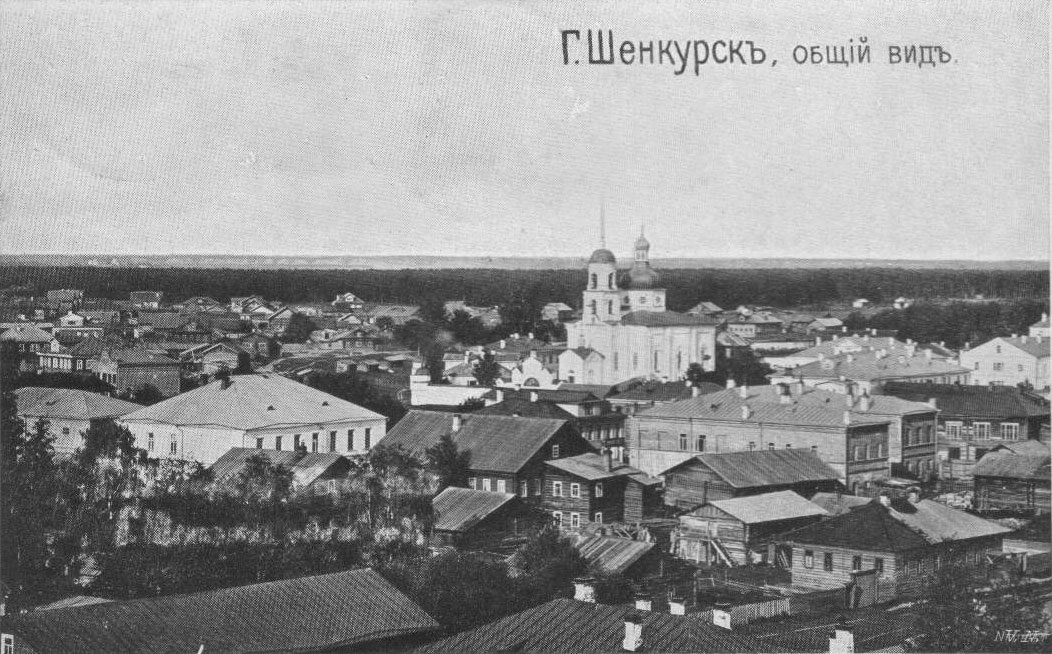
Panoramic view of pre-revolutionary Shenkursk with the Holy Trinity Church (currently in ruins)

Shenkursk was first mentioned in documents of Novgorod merchants in 1229. In 1315, it was bought by a Novgorod posadnik. Ivan the Terrible referred to this location as the town of Vaga and included it into his oprichnina. At that time, there was a timber fort and a residence of local bishops.

Tsar Feodor I made a grant of Shenkursk to his brother-in-law, Boris Godunov, who bequeathed it to his future son-in-law, Johan of Schleswig-Holstein, who died shortly after arriving to Russia. The Romanovs presented the area to Prince Dmitry Troubetskoy as his votchina. Upon his death, the town was returned to the crown. In 1640–1643, the Tsar ordered a new fortress to be built in Shenkursk. Catherine the Great chartered Shenkursk in 1780, and Shenkursk became the seat of the newly established Shenkursky Uyezd in Vologda Viceroyalty (from 1796, in Arkhangelsk Governorate).

Shenkursk played a prominent role in the Russian Civil War. In the autumn of 1918, about six thousand British and American troops advanced south of Shenkursk. On January 19–25, the Bolshevik troops staged a counteroffensive, known as the Battle of Shenkursk. Three thousand troops, split into three armies, advancing from three sides, cut Shenkursk off and moved the front area 90 kilometers (56 mi) north of Shenkursk.

Shenkursky Uyezd remained in Arkhangelsk Governorate until 1929, when several governorates were merged into Northern Krai and redistricted. In 1936, the krai was transformed into Northern Oblast. In 1937, Northern Oblast was split into Arkhangelsk Oblast and Vologda Oblast.

== Administrative and municipal status ==
Within the framework of administrative divisions, Shenkursk serves as the administrative center of Shenkursky District. As an administrative division, it is incorporated within Shenkursky District as the town of district significance of Shenkursk. As a municipal division, the town of district significance of Shenkursk is incorporated within Shenkursky Municipal District as Shenkurskoye Urban Settlement.

== Economy ==
=== Industry ===
There is timber industry and food industry, including milk production.

=== Transportation ===
Shenkursk is located several kilometers east from the M8 Highway—one of the principal highways in Russia—connecting Moscow and Arkhangelsk; however, it lies on the other bank of the Vaga and is only connected with the highway by a ferry crossing. The roads on the right bank of the Vaga are of minor importance and unpaved.

The Vaga is navigable, but there is no passenger navigation.

== Culture and recreation ==
The town contains twenty-one objects classified as cultural and historical heritage of local importance. Most of these are merchant houses built prior to 1917 and the remains of the former Holy Trinity Monastery.

Shenkursk hosts the Shenkursky District Museum.

== Notable people ==
- Ratmir Kholmov (1925–2006), Russian chess Grandmaster
