= Shenkursky District =

Shenkursky District Шенкурский район (Russian)
- District
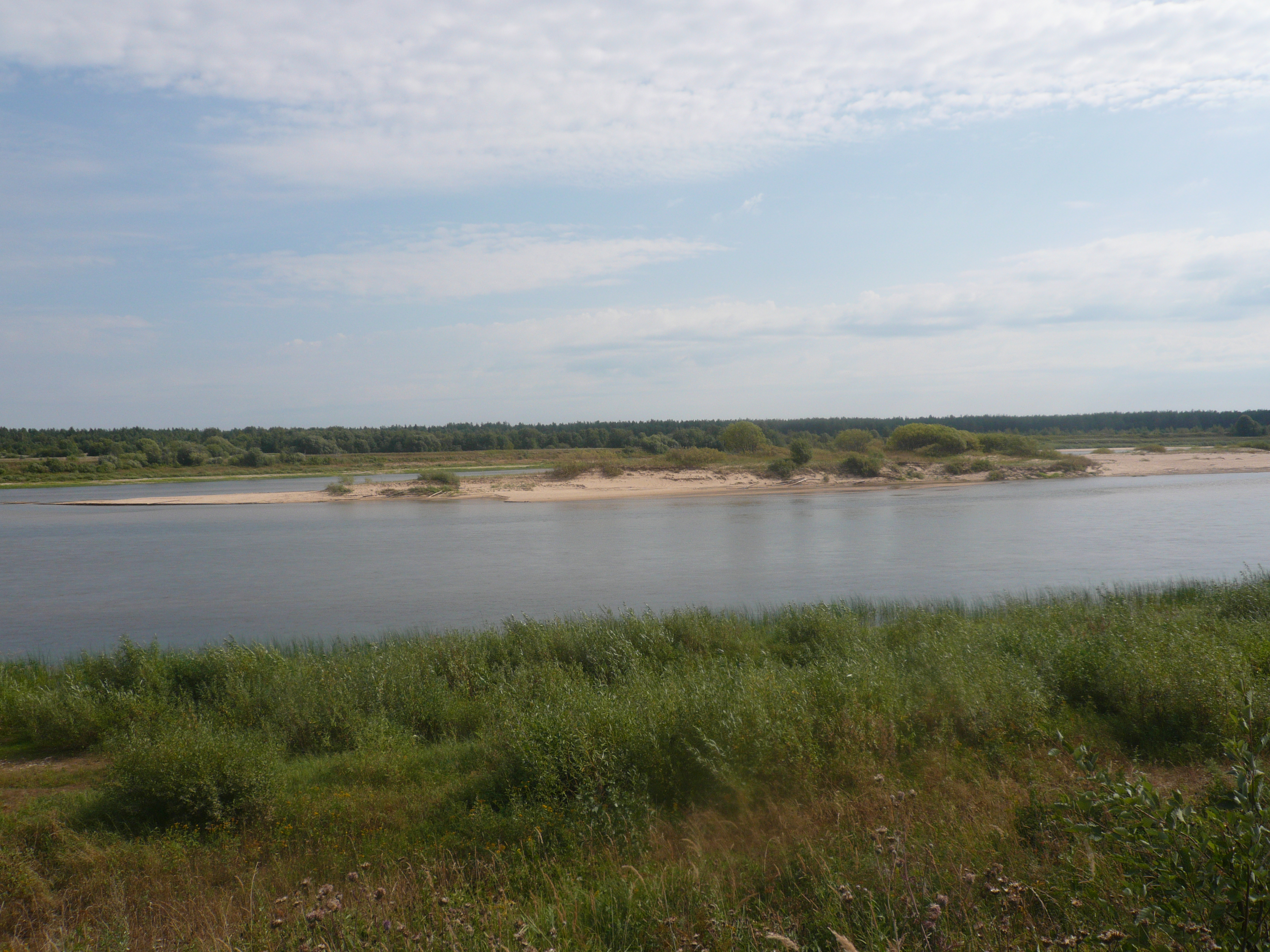
- The Vaga River near the selo of Rovdino, Shenkursky District

- Flag Coat of arms
- Location of Shenkursky District in Arkhangelsk Oblast
- Coordinates: 61°04′N 42°06′E
- Country: Russia
- Federal subject: Arkhangelsk Oblast
- Established: July 15, 1929
- Administrative center: Shenkursk

Area
  - Total: 11,298 km^{2} (4,362 sq mi)

Population (2010 Census)
  - Total: 15,196
  - Density: 1.3450/km^{2} (3.4836/sq mi)
  - Urban: 37.5%
  - Rural: 62.5%

Administrative structure
  - Administrative divisions: 1 Towns of district significance, 12 Selsoviets
  - Inhabited localities: 1 cities/towns, 252 rural localities

Municipal structure
  - Municipally incorporated as: Shenkursky Municipal District
  - Municipal divisions: 1 urban settlements, 8 rural settlements
- Time zone: UTC+3 (MSK)
- OKTMO ID: 11658000
- Website: http://www.shenkursk-region.ru/

Shenkursky District (Russian: Ше́нкурский райо́н) is an administrative district (raion), one of the twenty-one in Arkhangelsk Oblast, Russia. As a municipal division, it is incorporated as Shenkursky Municipal District. It is located in the south of the oblast and borders with Vinogradovsky District in the north, Verkhnetoyemsky District in the east, Ustyansky District in the southeast, Velsky District in the south, Nyandomsky District in the west, and with Plesetsky District in the northwest. The area of the district is 11,298 square kilometers (4,362 sq mi). Its administrative center is the town of Shenkursk. Population: 15,196 (2010 census); 18,680 (2002 census); 22,597 (1989 Soviet census). The population of Shenkursk accounts for 37.5% of the district's total population.

== Geography ==
The district is located in the valley of the Vaga River, a major left tributary of the Northern Dvina. A major tributary of the Vaga is the Led River (left). Some areas in the east, northeast, north, and west of the district lie in the basin of various left tributaries of the Northern Dvina. There are many glacial lakes in the district, the biggest of which is Lake Lum.

Most of the district is covered by coniferous forests (taiga). There are meadows in the floodplains of the river valleys, most notably the Vaga's, and swamps.

== History ==
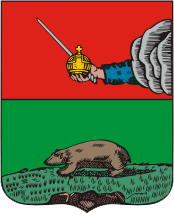
Coat of arms of Shenkursk from 1780

The area was populated by speakers of Uralic languages and then colonized by the Novgorod Republic. After the fall of Novgorod, the area became a part of the Grand Duchy of Moscow. Historically, it was a part of Vazhsky Uyezd, a vast area including almost all of the basin of the Vaga River. Chronicles mention Shenkursk in 1229 as Sheng-Kurye. In 1426, Varlaam Vazhsky, who was later beautified as a saint, founded the Vazhsky Monastery. In the course of the administrative reform carried out in 1708 by Peter the Great, the area was included into Archangelgorod Governorate, In 1780, the governorate was abolished and transformed into Vologda Viceroyalty. Vazhsky Uyezd was split, and the area of the current Shenkursky District became a part of the newly established Shenkursky Uyezd. In 1796, Shenkursky Uyezd was transferred to Arkhangelsk Governorate.

Shenkursk played a prominent role in the Russian Civil War. In the autumn of 1918, about six thousand British and American troops advanced south of Shenkursk. On January 19-25, the Bolshevik troops staged a counteroffensive, known as the Battle of Shenkursk. Three thousand troops, split into three armies, advancing from three sides, cut Shenkursk off, and moved the front area 90 kilometers (56 mi) north of Shenkursk.

Shenkursky Uyezd remained in Arkhangelsk Governorate until 1929, when several governorates were merged into Northern Krai. On July 15, 1929, the uyezds were abolished, and Shenkursky Uyezd was split into Shenkursky, Bereznikovsky, and Rovdinsky Districts. Shenkursky District became a part of Nyandoma Okrug of Northern Krai. Rovdinsky District, with the administration located in Rovdino, existed until 1959 (with a brief break between 1931 and 1935). On September 11, 1959, the district was abolished and split between Shenkursky and Velsky Districts; the district's administrative center Rovdino became a part of Shenkursky District.

In the following years, the first-level administrative division of Russia kept changing. In 1930, the okrug was abolished, and the district was subordinated to the central administration of Northern Krai. In 1936, the krai itself was transformed into Northern Oblast. In 1937, Northern Oblast was split into Arkhangelsk Oblast and Vologda Oblast. Shenkursky District remained in Arkhangelsk Oblast ever since.

== Divisions ==
=== Administrative divisions ===
As an administrative division, the district is divided into twelve selsoviets and one urban-type settlement with jurisdictional territory (Shenkursk). The following selsoviets have been established (the administrative centers are given in parentheses):

- Fedorogorsky (Nikiforovskaya)
- Mikhaylovsky (Zapakovskaya)
- Khozminsky (Ispolinovka)
- Nikolsky (Shipunovskaya)
- Rovdinsky (Rovdino)
- Shakhanovsky (Nosovskaya)
- Shegovarsky (Shegovary)
- Syumsky (Kulikovskaya)
- Tarnyansky (Rybogorskaya)
- Ust-Padengsky (Ust-Padenga)
- Verkholedsky (Rakovskaya)
- Verkhopadengsky (Ivanovskoye)
- Yamskogorsky (Odintsovskaya)

=== Municipal divisions ===
As a municipal division, the district is divided into one urban settlement and eight rural settlements (the administrative centers are given in parentheses):

- Shenkurskoye Urban Settlement (Shenkursk)
- Fedorogorskoye Rural Settlement (Nikiforovskaya)
- Nikolskoye Rural Settlement (Shipunovskaya)
- Rovdinskoye Rural Settlement (Rovdino)
- Syumskoye Rural Settlement (Kulikovskaya)
- Ust-Padengskoye Rural Settlement (Ust-Padenga)
- Verkholedskoye Rural Settlement (Rakovskaya)
- Verkhopadengskoye Rural Settlement (Ivanovskoye)
- Yamskogorskoye Rural Settlement (Odintsovskaya)

== Economy ==
=== Industry ===
The basis of the economy of the district is timber industry. There is also food industry, including milk production.

=== Transportation ===
One of the principal highways in Russia, M8 connecting Moscow and Arkhangelsk, crosses the district from south to north. Shenkursk is located several kilometers east from the highway; however, it lies on the other bank of the Vaga and is only connected with the highway by a ferry crossing. The roads on the right bank of the Vaga are minor.

The Vaga is navigable within the limits of the district, but there is no passenger navigation.

== Culture and recreation ==
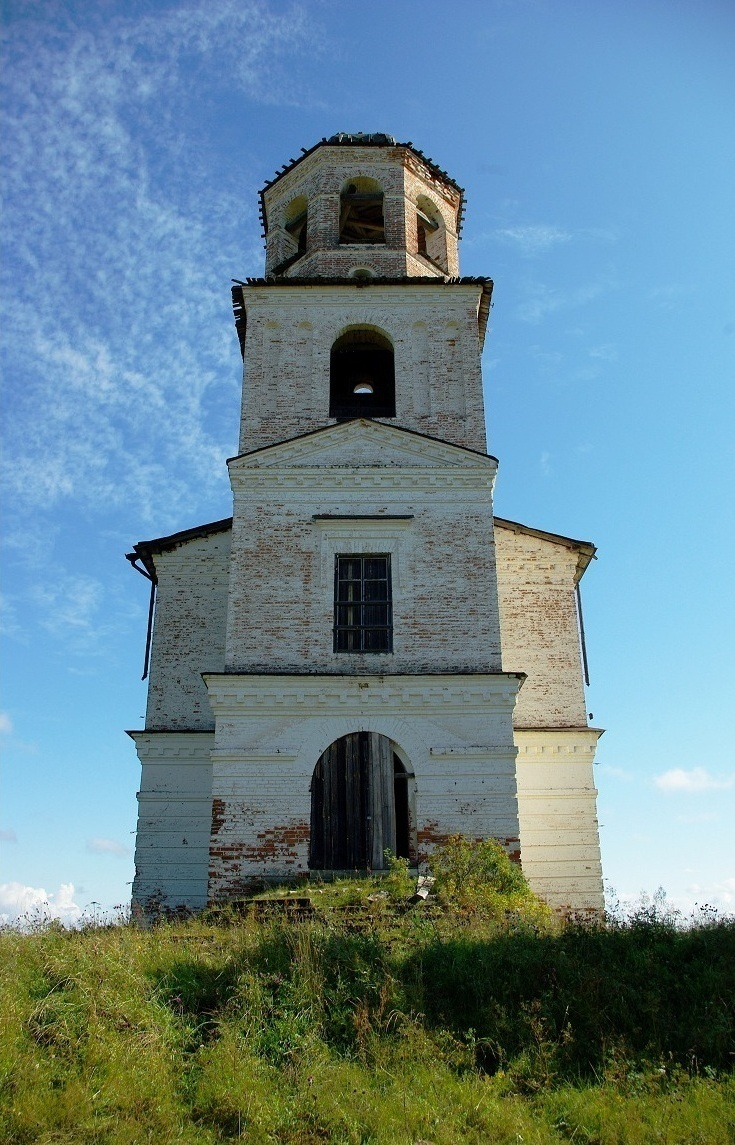
The bell-tower of the Ascencion Church in the selo of Yamskogorye

The district contains four objects classified as cultural and historical heritage by Russian Federal law, and additionally ninety-four objects classified as cultural and historical heritage of local importance. Most of these are wooden rural houses, churches, and bridges built prior to 1917.

The four objects protected at the federal level include:

- Bogoslovsky Pogost which is the ensemble consisting of the wooden Church of Three Holy Hierarchs (1782) and the Chapel of St. Varlaam of Vaga (1821), both neglected
- The Assumption Church in the settlement of Sulonda (1667), which burned down in the 1970s

The only museum in the district is Shenkursky District Museum.
