= Kopachyovo =

Kopachyovo Копачёво
- Village
- Location within Arkhangelsk Oblast Location within Russia
- Coordinates: 63°57′N 41°42′E
- Country: Russia
- Region: Arkhangelsk Oblast
- District: Kholmogorsky District

Population
  - Total: 233
- Time zone: UTC+3:00

Kopachyovo (Russian: Копачёво) is a rural locality (a village) in Matigorskoye Rural Settlement of Kholmogorsky District, Arkhangelsk Oblast, Russia. The population was 233 as of 2010.

== Geography ==
Kopachyovo is located 38 km south of Kholmogory (the district's administrative centre) by road. Pyatkovo is the nearest rural locality.
