= Pyatkovo =

Pyatkovo Пятково
- Village
- Location within Arkhangelsk Oblast Location within Russia
- Coordinates: 63°56′N 41°41′E
- Country: Russia
- Region: Arkhangelsk Oblast
- District: Kholmogorsky District

Population
  - Total: 25
- Time zone: UTC+3:00

Pyatkovo (Russian: Пятково) is a rural locality (a village) in Matigorskoye Rural Settlement of Kholmogorsky District, Arkhangelsk Oblast, Russia. The population was 25 as of 2010. There are 3 streets.

== Geography ==
Pyatkovo is located on the Severnaya Dvina River, 39 km south of Kholmogory (the district's administrative centre) by road. Kopachyovo is the nearest rural locality.
