= Malaya Tovra =

Malaya Tovra Малая Товра
- Settlement
- Location within Arkhangelsk Oblast Location within Russia
- Coordinates: 64°06′N 41°42′E
- Country: Russia
- Region: Arkhangelsk Oblast
- District: Kholmogorsky District

Population
  - Total: 138
- Time zone: UTC+3:00

Malaya Tovra (Russian: Малая Товра) is a rural locality (a settlement) in Matigorskoye Rural Settlement of Kholmogorsky District, Arkhangelsk Oblast, Russia. The population was 138 as of 2010.

== Geography ==
Malaya Tovra is located 22 km south of Kholmogory (the district's administrative centre) by road. Bolshaya Tovra is the nearest locality.
