= Bolshaya Tovra =

Bolshaya Tovra Большая Товра
- Village
- Location within Arkhangelsk Oblast Location within Russia
- Coordinates: 64°05′N 41°42′E
- Country: Russia
- Region: Arkhangelsk Oblast
- District: Kholmogorsky District

Population
  - Total: 20
- Time zone: UTC+3:00

Bolshaya Tovra (Russian: Большая Товра) is a rural locality (a village) in Kholmogorsky District, Arkhangelsk Oblast, Russia. The population was 20 as of 2012.

== Geography ==
Bolshaya Tovra is located 24 km south of Kholmogory (the district's administrative centre) by road. Malaya Tovra is the nearest rural locality.
