= Savinsky (inhabited locality) =

Savinsky (Russian: Савинский; masculine), Savinskaya (Савинская; feminine), or Savinskoye (Савинское; neuter) is the name of several inhabited localities in Russia.

== Arkhangelsk Oblast ==
As of 2010, thirteen inhabited localities in Arkhangelsk Oblast bear this name.

Urban localities

- Savinsky, Arkhangelsk Oblast, a work settlement in Plesetsky District

Rural localities

- Savinskoye, Arkhangelsk Oblast, a selo under the administrative jurisdiction of Savinsky Urban-Type Settlement with Jurisdictional Territory, Plesetsky District
- Savinskaya, Tikhmangsky Selsoviet, Kargopolsky District, Arkhangelsk Oblast, a village in Tikhmangsky Selsoviet of Kargopolsky District
- Savinskaya, Usachevsky Selsoviet, Kargopolsky District, Arkhangelsk Oblast, two villages in Usachevsky Selsoviet of Kargopolsky District
- Savinskaya, Krasnoborsky District, Arkhangelsk Oblast, two villages in Cherevkovsky Selsoviet of Krasnoborsky District
- Savinskaya, Nyandomsky District, Arkhangelsk Oblast, a village in Lepshinsky Selsoviet of Nyandomsky District
- Savinskaya, Primorsky District, Arkhangelsk Oblast, a village in Koskogorsky Selsoviet of Primorsky District
- Savinskaya, Puysky Selsoviet, Velsky District, Arkhangelsk Oblast, a village in Puysky Selsoviet of Velsky District
- Savinskaya, Ust-Velsky Selsoviet, Velsky District, Arkhangelsk Oblast, a village in Ust-Velsky Selsoviet of Velsky District
- Savinskaya, Verkhneustkuloysky Selsoviet, Velsky District, Arkhangelsk Oblast, a village in Verkhneustkuloysky Selsoviet of Velsky District
- Savinskaya, Vinogradovsky District, Arkhangelsk Oblast, a village in Morzhegorsky Selsoviet of Vinogradovsky District

== Irkutsk Oblast ==
As of 2010, one rural locality in Irkutsk Oblast bears this name:

- Savinskaya, Irkutsk Oblast, a village in Cheremkhovsky District

== Ivanovo Oblast ==
As of 2010, two rural localities in Ivanovo Oblast bear this name:

- Savinskaya, Puchezhsky District, Ivanovo Oblast, a village in Puchezhsky District
- Savinskaya, Vichugsky District, Ivanovo Oblast, a village in Vichugsky District

== Kaluga Oblast ==
As of 2010, one rural locality in Kaluga Oblast bears this name:

- Savinskoye, Kaluga Oblast, a village in Babyninsky District

== Republic of Karelia ==
As of 2010, one rural locality in the Republic of Karelia bears this name:

- Savinskaya, Republic of Karelia, a village in Medvezhyegorsky District

== Khabarovsk Krai ==
As of 2010, one rural locality in Khabarovsk Krai bears this name:

- Savinskoye, Khabarovsk Krai, a selo in Ulchsky District

== Kostroma Oblast ==
As of 2010, two rural localities in Kostroma Oblast bear this name:

- Savinskoye, Kostroma Oblast, a village in Raslovskoye Settlement of Sudislavsky District
- Savinskaya, Kostroma Oblast, a village in Georgiyevskoye Settlement of Mezhevskoy District

== Leningrad Oblast ==
As of 2010, one rural locality in Leningrad Oblast bears this name:

- Savinskaya, Leningrad Oblast, a village in Vinnitskoye Settlement Municipal Formation of Podporozhsky District

== Moscow Oblast ==
As of 2010, two rural localities in Moscow Oblast bear this name:

- Savinskaya, Orekhovo-Zuyevsky District, Moscow Oblast, a village in Belavinskoye Rural Settlement of Orekhovo-Zuyevsky District
- Savinskaya, Shatursky District, Moscow Oblast, a village in Dmitrovskoye Rural Settlement of Shatursky District

== Perm Krai ==
Savinskoye, Perm Krai, Permsky District; disestablished in 2022

== Smolensk Oblast ==
As of 2010, one rural locality in Smolensk Oblast bears this name:

- Savinskoye, Smolensk Oblast, a village in Pigulinskoye Rural Settlement of Kholm-Zhirkovsky District

== Republic of Tatarstan ==
As of 2010, one rural locality in the Republic of Tatarstan bears this name:

- Savinsky, Republic of Tatarstan, a settlement in Alexeyevsky District

== Tver Oblast ==
As of 2010, two rural localities in Tver Oblast bear this name:

- Savinskoye, Tver Oblast, a village in Torzhoksky District
- Savinskaya, Tver Oblast, a village in Kalyazinsky District

== Vladimir Oblast ==
As of 2010, one rural locality in Vladimir Oblast bears this name:

- Savinskaya, Vladimir Oblast, a village in Gus-Khrustalny District

== Volgograd Oblast ==
As of 2010, one rural locality in Volgograd Oblast bears this name:

- Savinsky, Volgograd Oblast, a khutor in Dobrinsky Selsoviet of Surovikinsky District

== Vologda Oblast ==
As of 2010, eleven rural localities in Vologda Oblast bear this name:

- Savinskoye, Kirillovsky District, Vologda Oblast, a village in Nikolo-Torzhsky Selsoviet of Kirillovsky District
- Savinskoye, Sheksninsky District, Vologda Oblast, a village in Ugolsky Selsoviet of Sheksninsky District
- Savinskoye, Velikoustyugsky District, Vologda Oblast, a village in Orlovsky Selsoviet of Velikoustyugsky District
- Savinskaya, Babayevsky District, Vologda Oblast, a village in Timoshinsky Selsoviet of Babayevsky District
- Savinskaya, Kharovsky District, Vologda Oblast, a village in Mikhaylovsky Selsoviet of Kharovsky District
- Savinskaya, Syamzhensky District, Vologda Oblast, a village in Ustretsky Selsoviet of Syamzhensky District
- Savinskaya, Tarnogsky District, Vologda Oblast, a village in Verkhovsky Selsoviet of Tarnogsky District
- Savinskaya, Verkhovazhsky District, Vologda Oblast, a village in Sibirsky Selsoviet of Verkhovazhsky District
- Savinskaya, Maryinsky Selsoviet, Vozhegodsky District, Vologda Oblast, a village in Maryinsky Selsoviet of Vozhegodsky District
- Savinskaya, Tiginsky Selsoviet, Vozhegodsky District, Vologda Oblast, a village in Tiginsky Selsoviet of Vozhegodsky District
- Savinskaya, Vozhegodsky Selsoviet, Vozhegodsky District, Vologda Oblast, a village in Vozhegodsky Selsoviet of Vozhegodsky District

== Yaroslavl Oblast ==
As of 2010, nine rural localities in Yaroslavl Oblast bear this name:

- Savinskoye, Bolsheselsky District, Yaroslavl Oblast, a village in Blagoveshchensky Rural Okrug of Bolsheselsky District
- Savinskoye, Borisoglebsky District, Yaroslavl Oblast, a selo in Vysokovsky Rural Okrug of Borisoglebsky District
- Savinskoye, Pervomaysky District, Yaroslavl Oblast, a village in Nikologorsky Rural Okrug of Pervomaysky District
- Savinskoye, Poshekhonsky District, Yaroslavl Oblast, a village in Kolodinsky Rural Okrug of Poshekhonsky District
- Savinskoye, Rostovsky District, Yaroslavl Oblast, a selo in Savinsky Rural Okrug of Rostovsky District
- Savinskoye, Mikhaylovsky Rural Okrug, Rybinsky District, Yaroslavl Oblast, a village in Mikhaylovsky Rural Okrug of Rybinsky District
- Savinskoye, Ogarkovsky Rural Okrug, Rybinsky District, Yaroslavl Oblast, a village in Ogarkovsky Rural Okrug of Rybinsky District
- Savinskoye, Tutayevsky District, Yaroslavl Oblast, a selo in Pomogalovsky Rural Okrug of Tutayevsky District
- Savinskoye, Uglichsky District, Yaroslavl Oblast, a village in Otradnovsky Rural Okrug of Uglichsky District
