= Samuel Pearse =

Recipient of the Victoria Cross (1897–1919)

Samuel George Pearse VC MM
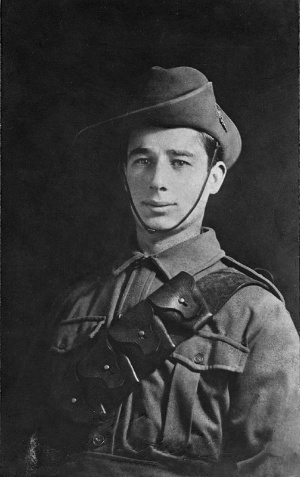
- Private Samuel Pearse c.1915
- Born: 16 July 1897; Penarth, Glamorganshire, Wales
- Died: 29 August 1919 (aged 22) north of Emtsa, Russia
- Burial place: Obozerskay
- Military career
- Allegiance: Australia; United Kingdom
- Branch: Australian Imperial Force (1913–19); British Army (1919)
- Service years: 1913–1919
- Rank: Sergeant
- Units: 73rd Battalion; 7th Battalion; 1st Machine Gun Battalion; 45th Battalion, Royal Fusiliers
- Conflicts: First World War; Russian Civil War
- Awards: Victoria Cross; Military Medal

Samuel George Pearse, VC, MM (16 July 1897 – 29 August 1919) was an Australian recipient of the Victoria Cross, the highest award for gallantry in the face of the enemy that can be awarded to British and Commonwealth forces. Serving in the Australian Imperial Force during the First World War, he saw action during the final weeks of the Gallipoli Campaign in 1915 and later on the Western Front from 1916 to 1918. Following the Armistice he fought as part of the North Russia Relief Force with the British Army during the North Russia Campaign in 1919. He was killed after charging a machine gun post during an action at Emtsa, in North Russia, for which he was posthumously awarded the Victoria Cross.

== Early life ==
Samuel George Pearse was born on 16 July 1897 at Penarth, Glamorganshire, Wales, to George Stapleton Pearse and his wife Sarah Ann, née Sellick. Initially educated at Penarth Boarding School, he moved to Australia with his family in 1911, with his father acquiring a property near at Koorlong, near Mildura, Victoria. Pearse later worked as a fruit-picker, labourer, trapper, and as a deck-hand on a paddle-steamer.

== Military service ==
Pearse served in the Militia for two years with the 73rd Infantry Regiment, before volunteering for overseas service with the Australian Imperial Force (AIF) during the First World War. At the time of his enlistment in the AIF in July 1915 just before he turned eighteen, Pearse's occupation was as a rabbit-trapper. He sailed from Melbourne on 10 September 1915 aboard the Star of Victoria, assigned to the 9th Reinforcement for the 7th Battalion reaching Gallipoli shortly before the evacuation and spending two weeks in the line there in December 1915.

After transferring to the 2nd Machine Gun Company, assigned to support the 2nd Brigade, Pearse subsequently saw action on the Western Front where he was wounded on 24 August 1916 but soon returned to his unit. On 28 September 1917 he was awarded the Military Medal for an action in single-handedly raiding a German machine gun-post east of Ypres in Belgium:

Normally this man is a runner ....and throughout he showed an utter disregard of danger in carrying messages, guiding parties and in bringing in wounded men on every return run.

Challinger records that Pearse was awarded his Military Medal in the field by General Sir William Birdwood but that at the time Birdwood had run out of medals and decorated Pearse with a strip of medal ribbon. Challinger also references Pearse's army record which quite apart from his awards for valour includes entries for neglect of duty, absence from guard and disobedience to orders. He was promoted to lance corporal on 21 November 1917, and to corporal on 10 April 1918. He was wounded in action for a second time on 19 May 1918. He subsequently returned to England to recover, but did not return to his unit until the end of the war. After undergoing training at the Machine Gun Depot, he was posted the 1st Machine Gun Battalion on 1 December 1918.

Following the Armistice, Pearse was attracted by the prospect of a tour of duty with the North Russia Relief Force and like the other 150 Australian soldiers who volunteered, Pearse was discharged from the AIF on 18 July 1919 and re-enlisted in the British Army as a private soldier. Many of the volunteering Australians had come late to action in First World War but Pearse was a battle-hardened veteran and was soon promoted to sergeant. He was a 22-year-old sergeant in the 45th Battalion, The Royal Fusiliers during the North Russia Campaign under the command of Brigadier General Lionel Sadleir-Jackson when the following deed took place for which he was awarded the VC:

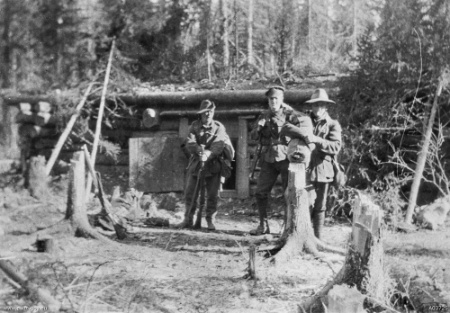
Members of No 2 Gun Crew of the Australian Section of the 201st Battalion, Machine Gun Corps, British North Russian Relief Force, moving off from a blockhouse in the Bolo's old winter line. This is believed to be the blockhouse where Sergeant Samuel George Pearse, an Australian serving with the 45th Battalion, Royal Fusiliers, won his posthumous award of the Victoria Cross on 29 August 1919 for extreme bravery. Date 9 September 1919

For most conspicuous bravery, devotion to duty and self-sacrifice during the operation against the enemy battery position north of Emtsa, North Russia on the 29th August 1919. Sergeant Pearse cut his way through enemy barbed-wire under very heavy machine-gun and rifle fire and cleared a way for the troops to enter an enemy battery position. Seeing that a blockhouse was harassing our advance and causing us casualties, he charged the blockhouse single-handed, killing the occupants with bombs. This gallant non-commissioned officer met his death a minute later and it was due to him that the position was carried with so few casualties. His magnificent bravery and utter disregard for personal danger won for him the admiration of all troops.

— The London Gazette, 21 October 1919

== Burial and medals ==
Samuel Pearse was buried in a military graveyard near the Obozerskaya railway station, between Emtsa and Archangel, North Russia. A photo taken in September 1919 shows his grave to be intact, but all visible traces of the graveyard eventually disappeared and the location forgotten. The Commonwealth War Graves Commission records him being buried in the Obozerskaya Burial Ground and then commemorated at the Archangel Allied Cemetery. The Allied War Cemetery in Archangel has plaques on its walls listing the names of all those buried elsewhere. His Victoria Cross, Military Medal and 1914–15 Star are on display under his photo in the Hall of Valour at the Australian War Memorial (AWM) in Canberra. Two other service medals were issued but their whereabouts is unknown.

In 2018, a small team of Russian volunteers found a grave believed to be that of Sgt. Pearse after part-time searching for more than ten years. Guided by a 1925 map and 1919 aerial photograph, the remains were exhumed and are currently being stored at the Archangel Morgue. As of 2019, formal DNA identification of the remains has not yet been undertaken but the skeleton is the same height as Sgt. Pearse (5'6"); the remains of a slouch hat were found in the grave; the grave was precisely as shown on the 1925 map; a toe was missing from the right foot, as mentioned in Pearse's Australian army records; and the whitewashed stones found during the exhumation appeared to be those shown in the 1919 photograph.

On 29 August 2019, a brief ceremony with nine people in attendance took place at the remains of the bunker where Pearse died, unofficially commemorating the 100th anniversary. Those in attendance included seven Russians – three members of the search team, a priest, a female interpreter, a female reporter and her cameraman – and two Australians, Damien Wright, historian and author (Churchill's Secret War With Lenin, 2017), and Richard Christen, grandson of Pearse.

== Family life ==
While on leave in England in January 1918 Pearse met Kitty Knox, an ambulance driver serving in the Women's Army Auxiliary Corps. They were engaged in May 1918 and that same month spent time together while Pearse was convalescing after suffering a foot wound. They were married on 1 June 1919 in Durham and when Kitty became pregnant they had decided to delay returning to Australia. The couple had a daughter, Victoria Catherine Sarah Pearse, born in February 1920, after his death. Kitty and Victoria later emigrated in May 1920 to Australia and Kitty married Albert Rose.
