= Lionel Sadleir-Jackson =

Brigadier-General Lionel Sadleir-Jackson CB CMG DSO* FRGS
- Born: 31 December 1876
- Died: 21 May 1932 (aged 55); Peronne, France
- Military career
- Allegiance: United Kingdom
- Branch: British Army
- Service years: 1898–1925
- Rank: Brigadier-General
- Units: 9th Lancers, Army Signals Corps
- Commands: 10th Battalion, London Regiment; 55th Brigade; North Russia Relief Force
- Conflicts: Second Boer War; World War I Russian Civil War
- Awards: Companion of the Order of the Bath; Companion of the Order of St Michael and St George; Distinguished Service Order & Bar; Mentioned in Despatches; Légion d'honneur Croix de Guerre (France)

Brigadier-General Lionel Warren de Vere Sadleir-Jackson, CB, CMG, DSO & Bar, FRGS (31 December 1876 – 21 May 1932) was an officer of the British Army who served in the Second Boer War and the First World War with distinction before taking command of the North Russia Relief Force which supervised the withdrawal of allied troops from the North Russia Campaign in the Russian Civil War.

A highly decorated officer, Sadleir-Jackson was wounded several times during his military service and later went on to become Inspector of Levies in British territories in the Middle East. He retired in 1925 but died in a vehicle accident during a tour of First World War battlefields in 1932.

== South Africa ==
Lionel Sadleir-Jackson was born on New Year's Eve 1876 to Major Henry Sadleir-Jackson of Midleton, County Cork. He joined the South Staffordshire Regiment of the Militia as a second lieutenant in 1896, and was promoted to lieutenant in 1897. He later took a regular army commission in the 9th Lancers, reverting to second lieutenant, aged 21 in May 1898. Shortly after receiving his regular commission he was dispatched to South Africa with his regiment to participate in the Second Boer War. During the war he was posted as a staff officer and saw extensive action, including at the battles of Belmont, Modder River and Magersfontein and Paardeberg, culminating in the relief of Kimberley. For his service in these actions, Sadleir-Jackson was promoted to lieutenant and continued service in the Orange Free State and the Transvaal.

During 1900 he served on the General Staff in the Orange River Colony, seeing action at the battles of Bethlehem, Wittebergen and Caledon River, and being Mentioned in Despatches. He was Aide-de-Camp to Brigadier-General Malcolm Orme Little, commander of the 9th Lancers, May–September 1900. Wounded in action, he recovered, and continued on operations in the Colony and in Cape Colony during 1901. In the same year he was twice more Mentioned in Despatches, the second being for "Gallantry on several occasions". At the war's conclusion in 1902 he was further rewarded with another mention in dispatches, the Queen's South Africa Medal with seven clasps and the King's South Africa Medal with two and the award of the Distinguished Service Order. Two years later he was promoted to captain and served in India for several years. In 1909 he briefly resigned his commission, but quickly reversed the decision and served as an adjutant in the 3rd County of London Yeomanry (Sharpshooters) regiment of the Territorial Army until 1912, when he moved to the Army Signal Corps. In the same year, he married Marion Fulton.

== First World War ==
At the outbreak of the First World War, Sadleir-Jackson was sent to France with the Signal Corps, serving as a staff officer on communications and signals. Early on he received a further Mention in Despatches. For his service in this role, he was promoted to major made a Companion of the Order of St Michael and St George in 1915. From 20 November 1916 – 1 June 1917 he was Assistant Director of Signals (with the acting rank of lieutenant-colonel. Following that he was given acting rank and placed in command of the 10th Battalion of the London Regiment, a Territorial Army formation. He commanded them in the trenches during the summer of 1917 but in October he was promoted to acting Brigadier-General and given command of the 54th Brigade, part of the 18th Division. He was again Mentioned in Despatches in December 1917 and then received a brevet promotion to lieutenant-colonel in early 1918.

With this force, Sadleir-Jackson weathered the German attacks of the spring of 1918 and was heavily embroiled in the second battle of the Somme, particularly the battle of Albert on 21 August 1918. In heavy fighting around the town of Albert, Sadleir-Jackson's men took their objectives led from the front by their Brigadier, who was wounded in the knee by machine gun fire near Bellevue Farm. Although Sadleir-Jackson attempted to return to British lines he collapsed and was brought in by his men, the wound proving serious enough to keep him in England until after the Armistice. For his conduct during the attack he was presented with a bar to his Distinguished Service Order in September 1918:

For conspicuous gallantry and devotion to duty. Throughout recent operations he proved himself a bold leader of men, and under all conditions full of energy and fine fighting spirit. He, personally organised and led most successful counter-attacks, in one of which he recaptured a village and took 150 prisoners and eleven machine guns.

=== Russia ===
In the autumn of 1918, Sadleir-Jackson was rewarded for his war service with the presentation of the Legion d'honneur and the Croix de Guerre with Star. The following year he was made a Companion of the Order of the Bath. Despite these accolades, Sadleir-Jackson volunteered again in late 1918 to command the 2nd Brigade of the Russian Relief Force, a motley collection of units from the British Army, the Royal Navy, Australian volunteers, French and US troops and White Russians. This force was intended to hold the vital Northern ports of Arkhangelsk and Murmansk open for Allied cargo ships supplying the White Russian armies fighting in the region as part of the Allied intervention in the Russian Civil War.

In the event, Sadleir-Jackson found himself operating independently and frequently in overall charge of the North Russia Campaign which suffered from poor morale and supply and a lack of political direction. In a matter of months the situation was so critical that by September 1919 the entire force was evacuated, abandoning the region to the Bolshevik armies. Nevertheless, in the months of fighting which became particularly desperate in August 1919, Sadleir-Jackson's men performed well and fought hard, two Australian volunteers in the 45th Battalion of the Royal Fusiliers even winning the Victoria Cross: Corporal Arthur Percy Sullivan and Sergeant Samuel George Pearse. Sadleir-Jackson performed well in enough to be again Mentioned in Despatches and be given a brevet promotion to colonel at the close of the campaign.

== Retirement ==
Returning from Russia exhausted, he was appointed to command a brigade of the Territorial Army from 20 June 1920 – 5 August 1921, receiving a substantive promotion to colonel to coincide with the start of the appointment. After this Sadleir-Jackson was transferred to a very different climate. Stationed in the newly gained British colonial territories in the Middle East he became Inspector of Levies for the freshly raised colonial forces there, including the Assyrian Levies. In 1923 he left this post for England, and took retirement in 1925 after 27 years in the army. He pursued his interests during his retirement, being a keen huntsman and big game hunter as well as an excellent polo player (in 1910 he co-wrote Hints on Polo Combination, with Walter Buckmaster). He was also a fellow of the Royal Geographical Society. In the late spring of 1932 he took a tour of the Somme battlefield, including the site of his wound fourteen years earlier. On 21 May 1932, he was driving near Peronne when he encountered a farm cart in the road and swerved too vigorously to avoid it, leaving the road and colliding with an electric pylon which severed the left front wheel and threw the car over. Lionel Sadleir-Jackson died shortly afterwards at Estrées-en-Chaussée as the result of massive head injuries.
