= Savinskoye Urban Settlement =

Savinskoye Urban Settlement is the name of several municipal formations in Russia:

- Savinskoye Urban Settlement, a municipal formation which Savinsky Urban-Type Settlement with Jurisdictional Territory in Plesetsky District of Arkhangelsk Oblast is incorporated as
- Savinskoye Urban Settlement, a municipal formation which the settlement of Savino in Savinsky District of Ivanovo Oblast is incorporated as

== See also ==
- Savinsky
