= Savinsky =

Savinsky (masculine), Savinskaya (feminine), or Savinskoye (neuter) may refer to:

- Anatoly Savinsky (b. 1986), Belarusian soccer player
- Olga Savinskaya, Miss World 1999 participant from Ukraine
- Savinsky District, a district of Ivanovo Oblast, Russia
- Savinskoye Urban Settlement, several municipal urban settlements in Russia
- Savinsky (inhabited locality) (Savinskaya, Savinskoye), several inhabited localities in Russia
