= Dmitry Razumovsky =

Russian politician

Dmitry Razumovsky Дмитрий Разумовский

10th Mayor of Kaluga
- In office 27 March 2018 – 20 December 2019
- Preceded by: Konstantin Gorobtsov
- Succeeded by: Dmitry Denisov

Personal details
- Born: November 13, 1977 (age 48) Savinsky, Arkhangelsk Oblast, RSFSR, USSR
- Party: United Russia

Dmitry Olegovich Razumovsky (Russian: Дмитрий Олегович Разумовский; born 1977) is a Russian politician. Since March 27, 2018, till December 20, 2019 — Мayor of Kaluga.

Razumovsky was born on November 13, 1977, in the village of Arkhangelsk Oblast. He graduated from the Kaluga branch of the North-West Academy of Public Administration and the Kaluga branch of the Moscow State Technical University. Candidate of Economic Sciences.

He worked in leading positions of several large enterprises. Since November 2009, he held the post of Director of the Department of Nature Management and Ecology in the Corporation for Development of the Kaluga Oblast. Since March 2010, the head of the Department of Economics and Property Relations of the City Council of Kaluga. In 2013, he became Minister of Information Society Development of the Kaluga Region. In 2016 he was appointed Minister of Economic Development of the Kaluga Oblast.

Razumovsky was Мayor of Kaluga since March 27, 2018, till December 20, 2019. 20 December 2019 Razumovsky was appointed to Deputy Governor of Kaluga Oblast.
