= Reginald Howlett =

British Army officer and Colonel of the Royal Fusiliers (1882–1942)

- Born: 1882
- Died: 20 October 1942 (aged 59−60)
- Military career
- Allegiance: United Kingdom
- Branch: British Army
- Service years: 1900−1942
- Rank: Brigadier
- Service number: 492
- Unit: Royal Fusiliers
- Commands: 10th (Service) Battalion, Green Howards; 12th (Service) Battalion, Royal Northumberland Fusiliers; 2nd Battalion, Royal Fusiliers; 162nd Brigade; British troops in Jamaica
- Conflicts: First World War
- Awards: Commander of the Order of the British Empire; Distinguished Service Order; Military Cross

Brigadier Reginald Howlett CBE DSO MC (1882 – 20 October 1942) was a British Army officer who became colonel of the Royal Fusiliers.

== Military career ==
Howlett was commissioned as a second lieutenant in The Royal Fusiliers (City of London Regiment) on 11 August 1900. He saw active service in South Africa during the Second Boer War, and was invalided home three months after the end of the war, in September 1902. He returned to regular service with his regiment in November 1902.

He served in the First World War latterly as commanding officer of the 10th (Service) Battalion, Green Howards and then as commanding officer of the 12th (Service) Battalion, Northumberland Fusiliers. He became commanding officer of 2nd Battalion, Royal Fusiliers in 1928, Commander of the 162nd Brigade in 1932 and Commanding Officer of the British troops in Jamaica in 1936 before retiring in 1939. He also served as colonel of the Royal Fusiliers.

Honorary titles
Preceded by Walter Hill	Colonel of the Royal Fusiliers; July–October 1942	Succeeded by Sir Reginald May
