= Reginald May =

British Army general (1879–1958)

General Sir Reginald May KCB KBE CMG DSO
- Born: 10 August 1879
- Died: 26 October 1958 (aged 79)
- Military career
- Allegiance: United Kingdom
- Branch: British Army
- Service years: 1898–1939
- Rank: General
- Service number: 26289
- Unit: Royal Fusiliers
- Commands: 49th (West Riding) Division; Royal Military College, Sandhurst
- Conflicts: Second Boer War; First World War
- Awards: Knight Commander of the Order of the Bath; Knight Commander of the Order of the British Empire; Companion of the Order of St Michael and St George; Distinguished Service Order; Mentioned in Despatches; Officer of the Legion of Honour (France); Army Distinguished Service Medal (United States); Commander of the Order of Leopold (Belgium)

General Sir Reginald Seaburne May, KCB, KBE, CMG, DSO (10 August 1879 – 26 October 1958) was a British Army officer who served as Quartermaster-General to the Forces.

== Military career ==
Educated at Haileybury, May was commissioned into the Royal Fusiliers as a second lieutenant on 3 August 1898, and promoted to lieutenant on 2 August 1899. He served with the 2nd Battalion in the Second Boer War, where he took part in the battles of Colenso (December 1899), engagements at Pieter's Hill, Hussar Hill and Hlangwani and the Relief of Ladysmith (February 1900); and later served in the Western Transvaal under Sir Archibald Hunter. May stayed in South Africa until the end of the war, and returned home on the SS Assaye in September 1902. For his service in the war he was noted for future promotion, which followed the next year when he was promoted to captain on 3 November 1903, with the brevet rank of major from the next day.

In January 1907 he became an officer in command of a company of gentlemen cadets at the Royal Military College, Sandhurst.

May later served in the First World War. He was promoted to major in September 1915.

After the war, and after being promoted to brevet colonel on 1 January 1919, he became Director of Movements and then, from 1923, Director of Recruiting and Organisation at the War Office. He was made Brigadier in charge of Administration at Northern Command in 1927 and then General Officer Commanding (GOC) of the 49th (West Riding) Division in 1930. He was appointed Commandant of the Royal Military College, Sandhurst, in 1931 and was promoted to lieutenant general on 16 July 1934. He was Quartermaster-General to the Forces in 1935; he retired in 1939.

In retirement he was Chairman of the Toc H Christian movement for ten years. He also served as colonel of his old regiment, the Royal Fusiliers.

== Family ==
In 1906 May married Marguerite Geraldine Ramsay Drake and together they had three sons. Then in 1932 he married Jane Monteith.

Military offices
Preceded by Neville Cameron	GOC 49th (West Riding) Infantry Division; 1930–1931	Succeeded by George Jackson
Preceded by Eric Girdwood	Commandant of the Royal Military College Sandhurst; 1931–1934	Succeeded by Bertie Fisher
Preceded by Sir Felix Ready	Quartermaster-General to the Forces; 1935–1939	Succeeded by Sir Walter Venning
Honorary titles
Preceded by Reginald Howlett	Colonel of the Royal Fusiliers; 1942–1947	Succeeded by James Harter
