= Walter Hill (British Army officer) =

Major-General Walter Hill CB CMG DSO
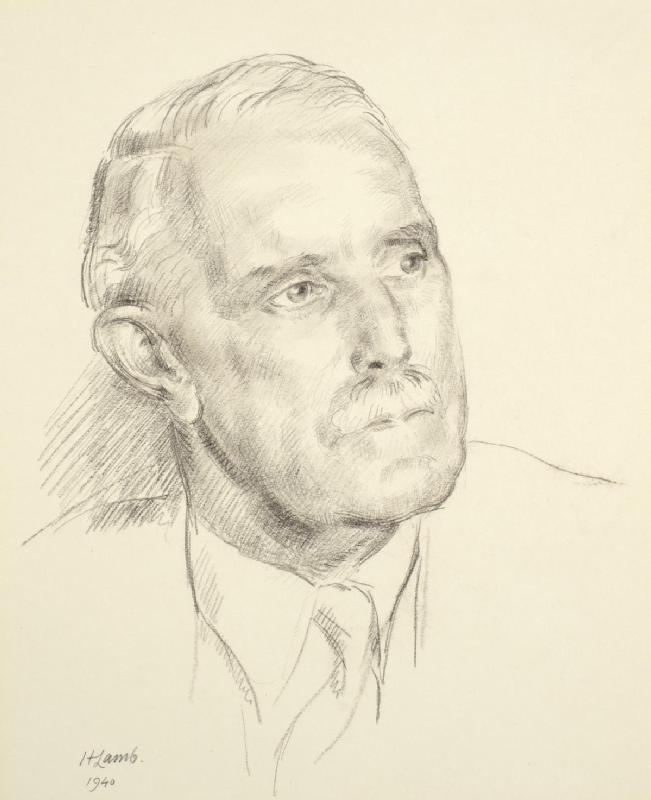
- Portrait by Henry Lamb
- Born: 10 June 1877
- Died: 26 July 1942 (aged 65)
- Military career
- Allegiance: United Kingdom
- Branch: British Army
- Service years: 1899–1938; 1939–1940
- Rank: Major-General
- Service number: 697
- Unit: Royal Fusiliers
- Commands: 11th Brigade (1931–33); 2nd Battalion, Loyal Regiment (1924–28)
- Conflicts: Second Boer War; First World War; Second World War
- Awards: Companion of the Order of the Bath; Companion of the Order of St Michael and St George; Distinguished Service Order; Mentioned in Despatches

Major-General Walter Pitts Hendy Hill, CB, CMG, DSO (10 June 1877 – 26 July 1942) was a British Army officer who was colonel of the Royal Fusiliers from 1933 to 1942.

== Military career ==
Hill joined the Royal Fusiliers, where he was commissioned a second lieutenant on 18 October 1899. He left Southampton in March 1900 on the SS Briton to serve with the 2nd Battalion in the Second Boer War in South Africa, where he was posted in Natal and Transvaal, taking part in engagements at Rooidam. He was promoted to lieutenant on 19 September 1900. He stayed in South Africa throughout the war, which ended with the Peace of Vereeniging in June 1902. Four months later he left Cape Town on the SS Salamis with other officers and men of the battalion, arriving at Southampton in late October, when the battalion was posted to Aldershot.

Hill served in the First World War as commander of a company of gentlemen cadets at the Royal Military College, Sandhurst, having served in this position since January 1913, as a deputy assistant quartermaster general in France from July 1915, and was promoted to major in September 1915. He was an assistant adjutant and quartermaster general in France from 1916 and as an assistant quartermaster general in France from 1917.

Hill became assistant commandant and chief instructor at the School of Military Administration in 1920, commander of the 2nd Battalion the Loyal Regiment in 1924, the same year in which he was promoted to colonel, and a general staff officer at the Staff College, Camberley, in 1928. He went on to be brigadier in charge of administration at Northern Command in 1929, brigadier in charge of administration at Eastern Command in 1931 and major general in charge of administration at Southern Command in 1934. He relinquished this assignment on 28 May 1938 and retired from the army on the same date. He also served as colonel of the Royal Fusiliers.

His son, James Hill, commanded the 3rd Parachute Brigade during the Second World War.

Honorary titles
Preceded by Sir Reginald Pinney	Colonel of the Royal Fusiliers; 1933–1942	Succeeded by Reginald Howlett
