= James Harter =

British Army general (1888–1960)

Major-General James Harter DSO MC
- Born: 30 August 1888
- Died: 1 November 1960 (aged 72)
- Military career
- Allegiance: United Kingdom
- Branch: British Army
- Service years: 1907–1943
- Rank: Major-General
- Service number: 1935
- Unit: Royal Fusiliers
- Commands: Northern Midlands District (1942–45); 5th Battalion, Suffolk Regiment (1939–40)
- Conflicts: First World War; Second World War
- Awards: Distinguished Service Order; Military Cross; Mentioned in Despatches (5); Croix de guerre (France)

Major-General James Francis Harter, DSO, MC (30 August 1888 – 1 November 1960) was a British Army officer who became colonel of the Royal Fusiliers.

== Military career ==
Harter was commissioned into the Royal Fusiliers, after having graduated from the Royal Military College, Sandhurst, in October 1907. He served with his regiment in the First World War, being wounded in 1914 and awarded the Military Cross in February 1915. Then, as a captain, he succeeded Richard O'Connor as brigade major of the 91st Infantry Brigade in May 1917, and was awarded the Distinguished Service Order in February 1918. The citation for the medal appeared in The London Gazette in July that year and reads as follows:

For conspicuous gallantry and devotion to duty. Being sent forward to establish a new headquarters, after the capture of the first objective, he found some troops held up by enemy fire. Having reorganised them, he planned an attack and cleared a wood of the enemy, a prompt action which had an important effect on the progress of the operations. On several later occasions he obtained, by personal reconnaissance, most valuable information, and under difficult situations has been of the greatest assistance to battalion commanders. He has always displayed initiative, gallantry and a soldierly instinct.

Harter was Mentioned in Despatches five times during the war and was awarded the French Croix de guerre in November 1918.

Attending the Staff College, Camberley, from 1924 to 1925, during the Second World War he commanded a formation in the North Midlands. He later served as colonel of the Royal Fusiliers.

== Bibliography ==
- Smart, Nick (2005). Biographical Dictionary of British Generals of the Second World War. Barnesley: Pen & Sword. ISBN 1844150496.

Honorary titles
| Preceded by Sir Reginald May | Colonel of the Royal Fusiliers; 1947–1954 | Succeeded by Francis Rome |
