= Walter Venning =

British Army officer and administrator

General Sir Walter Venning GCB CMG CBE MC
- Born: 17 January 1882; London, England
- Died: 19 June 1964 (aged 82); Sturminster Newton, Dorset, England
- Military career
- Allegiance: United Kingdom
- Branch: British Army
- Service years: 1901–1946
- Rank: General
- Commands: 2nd (Rawalpindi) Infantry Brigade (1931–1934)
- Conflicts: First World War; Second World War
- Awards: Knight Grand Cross of the Order of the Bath; Companion of the Order of St Michael and St George; Commander of the Order of the British Empire; Military Cross

General Sir Walter King Venning, GCB, CMG, CBE, MC (17 January 1882 – 19 June 1964) was a British Army officer and administrator who served in both World Wars. Known for his competency as an administrator, he served as Quartermaster-General to the Forces from 1939 to 1942 and Director General of the British Supply Mission in Washington, D.C. from 1942 to 1945.

== Military career ==
Venning was educated at Allhallows and Clifton College, followed by the Royal Military College, Sandhurst. Venning was commissioned into the Duke of Cornwall's Light Infantry in 1901. He saw service with the West African Frontier Force from 1907 to 1910. He was restored to the establishment in September 1910 and promoted to captain on 26 October 1911.

Venning saw active service in the First World War, earning the Military Cross in the King's 1915 Birthday Honours. He was promoted to deputy assistant adjutant general at the General Headquarters of the British Expeditionary Force, and then to Assistant Adjutant General at the War Office.

After the war, Venning became an instructor at the Staff College, Camberley, and then, in 1922, was promoted to assistant adjutant general at the War Office. He was appointed assistant adjutant and quartermaster general at Aldershot Command in 1927 and deputy adjutant and quartermaster general at Eastern Command in India in 1929. In 1931 he became commanding officer of the 2nd (Rawalpindi) Infantry Brigade in India and then received a promotion to major general on 1 October 1933.

In 1934 he returned to the British Army as director of movements and quartering at the War Office. He was promoted to lieutenant general on 29 January 1938.

In the Second World War, Venning served as Quartermaster-General to the Forces from 2 February 1939 to 1942; in this capacity he had responsibility for the War Office Fleet, which he despatched to Dunkirk in 1940 to evacuate Allied forces. According to The Times, "It was due to the superb organization which [Venning] created and directed that the mobilization of the Regular Army in 1939, the embodiment of the Territorial Army and the embarkation of the expeditionary force were carried out with such astonishing smoothness."

After being promoted to general in July 1940, Venning retired from the army at the age of 60 and as a civilian served as Director General of the British Supply Mission in Washington, D.C., from 1942 to 1945.

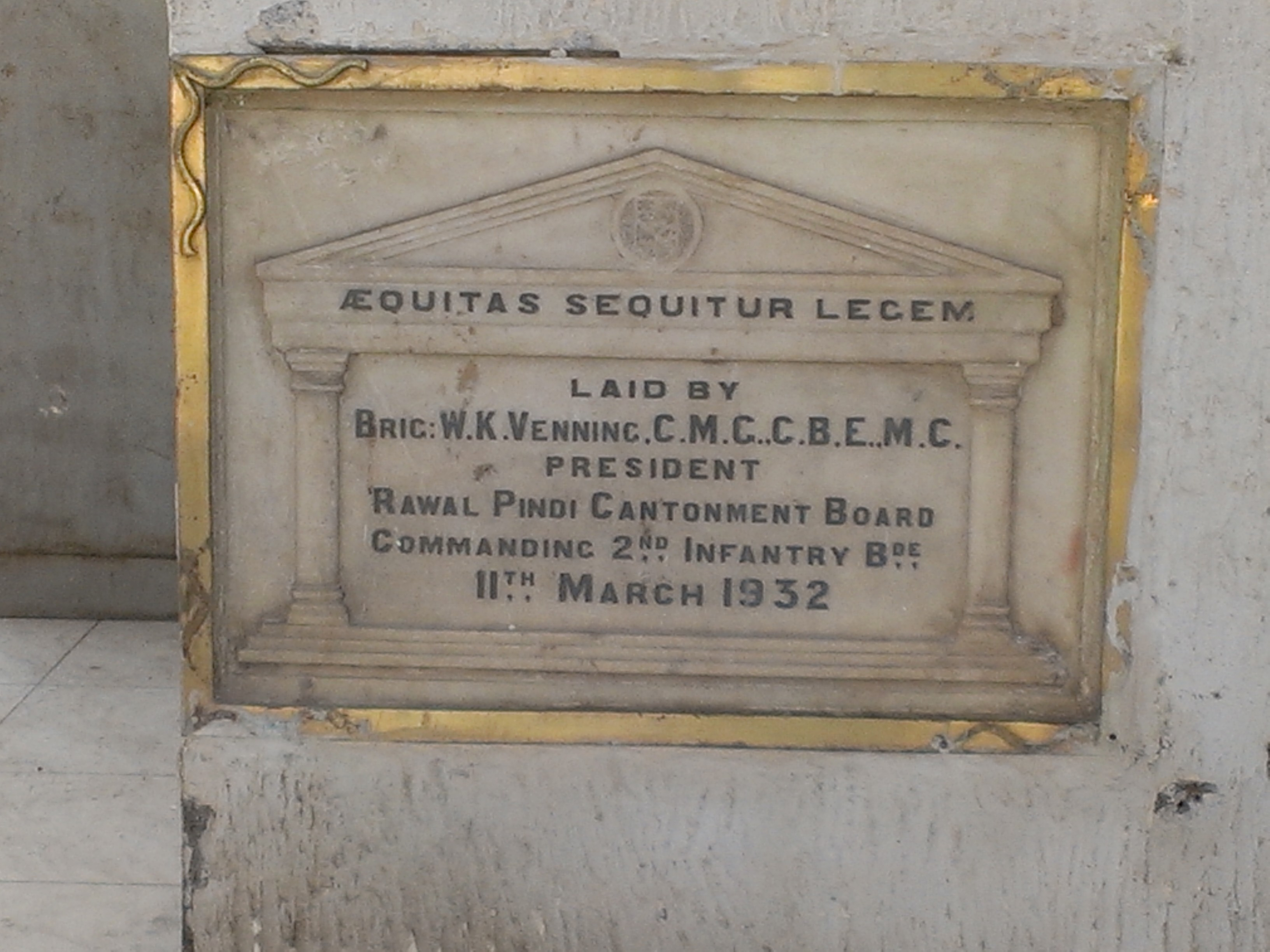
Cornerstone of Cantonment Public Library, Rawalpindi laid by Sir Walter Venning

== Honours ==
Venning was appointed a Companion of the Order of St Michael and St George (CMG) in the 1918 Birthday Honours for his war service, and a Commander of the Order of the British Empire (CBE) in the 1926 Birthday Honours. He was appointed a Companion of the Order of the Bath (CB) in the 1935 New Year Honours, promoted to Knight Commander of the Order (KCB) in the 1939 New Year Honours, and again to Knight Grand Cross of the Order (GCB) in the 1942 Birthday Honours.

== Namesake ==
Venning Barracks at MoD Donnington near Telford, Shropshire, is named after him.

== Bibliography ==
- Smart, Nick (2005). Biographical Dictionary of British Generals of the Second World War. Barnesley: Pen & Sword. ISBN 1844150496.

Honorary titles
Preceded by Martin Turner	Colonel of the Duke of Cornwall's Light Infantry; 1939–1942	Succeeded by Sir Daril Watson
Military offices
Preceded by Sir Reginald May	Quartermaster-General to the Forces; 1939–1942	Succeeded by Sir Thomas Riddell-Webster
