= Francis Rome =

British Army general

Major-General Francis Rome CB CMG CBE DSO
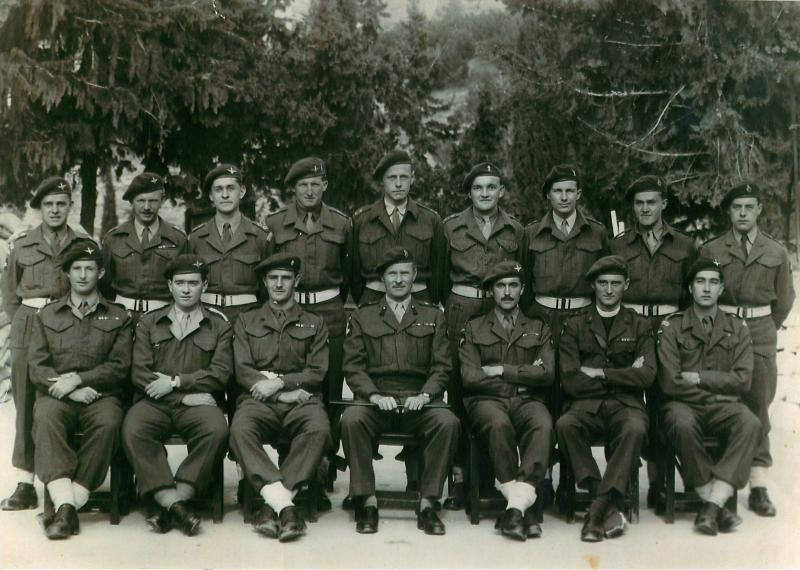
- Group photograph of officers of the 3rd Parachute Brigade in Nazareth, 1947; the brigade commander, Brigadier Francis Rome, is seated in the centre
- Born: 11 September 1905
- Died: 7 February 1985 (aged 79)
- Military career
- Allegiance: United Kingdom
- Branch: British Army
- Service years: 1925–1959
- Rank: Major-General
- Service number: 33750
- Commands: British Forces in Berlin (1956–59); 16th Airborne Division (1953–56); 1st Parachute Brigade (1947–48); 3rd Parachute Brigade (1946–47); 111th Indian Infantry Brigade (1944–45)
- Conflicts: Second World War
- Awards: Companion of the Order of the Bath; Companion of the Order of St Michael and St George; Commander of the Order of the British Empire; Distinguished Service Order

Major-General Francis David Rome, CB, CMG, CBE, DSO (11 September 1905 – 7 February 1985) was a senior officer in the British Army who served as Commandant of the British Sector in Berlin from 1956 to 1959.

== Military career ==
Rome was commissioned into the British Army in 1925. He transferred to the Royal Fusiliers in 1927. He served in the Second World War, latterly as commander of 111th Indian Infantry Brigade. After the war he became commander of 3rd Parachute Brigade in Palestine from 1946 and then commander of 1st Parachute Brigade in Palestine from 1947. He was appointed Assistant Commandant at the School of Land/Air Warfare in 1948 and Deputy Adjutant General at Far East Land Forces in 1950. He was then made General Officer Commanding 16th Airborne Division in 1953 and Commandant of the British Sector in Berlin in 1956; he retired in 1959. He also served as colonel of the Royal Fusiliers.

== Family ==
In 1936 Rome married Sybil Parry Carden.

Military offices
Preceded by Geoffrey Bourne	GOC 16th Airborne Division; 1953–1956	Post disbanded
Preceded by Robert Cottrell-Hill	Commandant, British Sector in Berlin; 1956–1959	Succeeded by Sir Rohan Delacombe
Honorary titles
Preceded by James Harter	Colonel of the Royal Fusiliers; 1954–1963	Succeeded by Sir Kenneth Darling
