= Savinskaya, Tiginsky Selsoviet, Vozhegodsky District, Vologda Oblast =

Savinskaya Савинская
- Village

- Location within Vologda Oblast Location within Russia
- Coordinates: 60°28′N 39°49′E
- Country: Russia
- Region: Vologda Oblast
- District: Vozhegodsky District
- Time zone: UTC+3:00

Savinskaya (Russian: Савинская) is a rural locality (a village) in Tiginskoye Rural Settlement, Vozhegodsky District, Vologda Oblast, Russia. The population was 91 as of 2002.

== Geography ==
The distance to Vozhega is 24 km, to Gridino is 4 km. Konevka, Shchegolikha, Malaya, Pozhar, Petrovka, Levinskaya are the nearest rural localities.
