= Royal Fusiliers =

Line infantry regiment of the British Army

7th Regiment of Foot Royal Fusiliers (City of London Regiment)
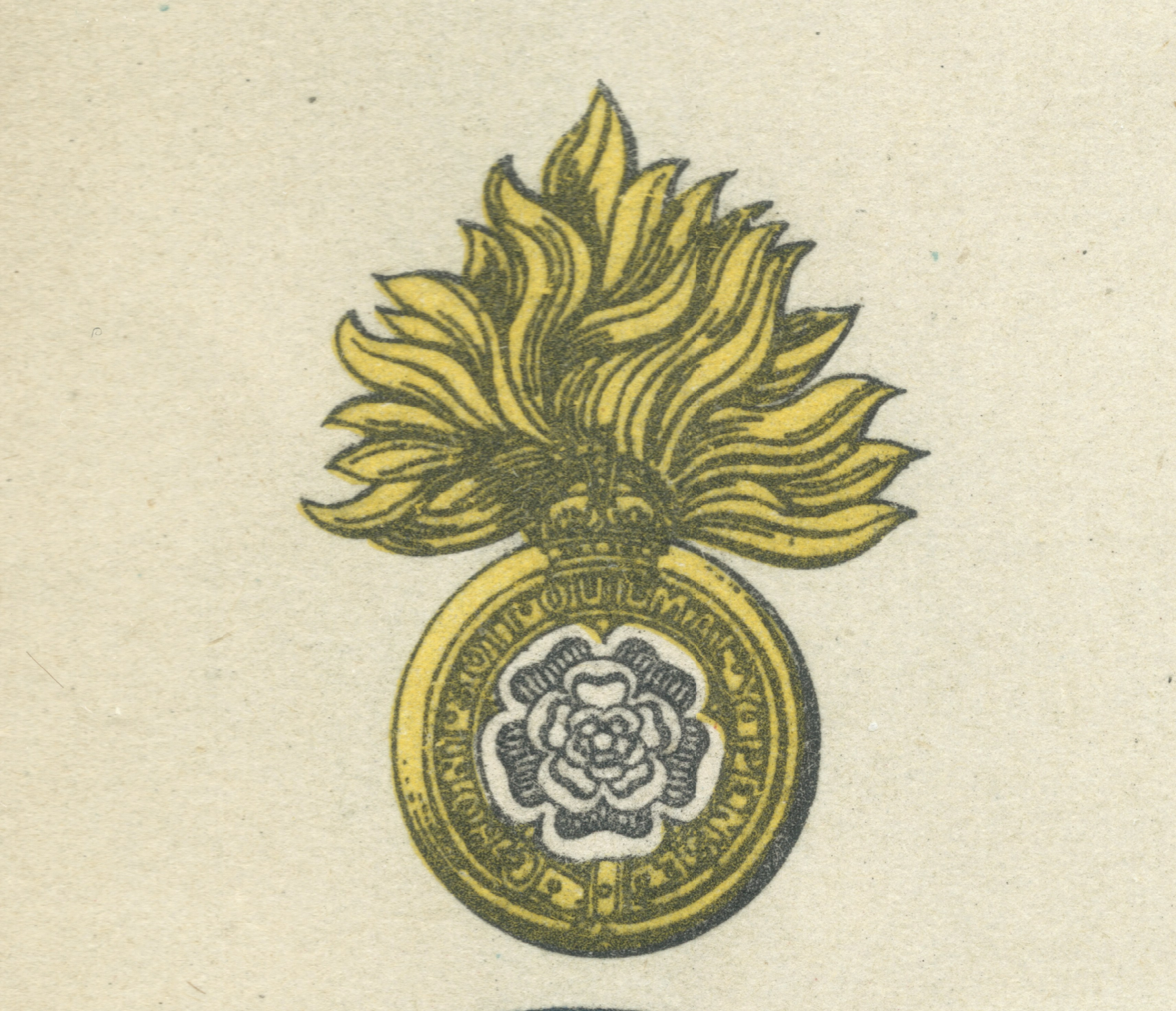
- The regimental cap badge
- Active: 1685–1968
- Country: Kingdom of England (1685–1707); Kingdom of Great Britain (1707–1800); United Kingdom (1801–1968)
- Branch: British Army
- Type: Infantry
- Role: Line infantry
- Size: 1–4 Regular battalions Up to 3 Militia and Special Reserve battalions Up to 4 Territorial and Volunteer battalions Up to 36 Hostilities-only battalions
- Garrison/HQ: Tower of London
- Nickname: The Elegant Extracts
- Motto: Honi soit qui mal y pense
- March: The Seventh Royal Fusiliers
- Anniversaries: Albuhera Day (16 May)

Insignia
- Hackle: White

The Royal Fusiliers (City of London Regiment) was a line infantry regiment of the British Army in continuous existence for 283 years. It was known as the 7th Regiment of Foot until the Childers Reforms of 1881.

The regiment served in many wars and conflicts throughout its long existence, including the Second Boer War, the First World War and the Second World War. In 1968, the regiment was amalgamated with the other regiments of the Fusilier Brigade – the Royal Northumberland Fusiliers, the Royal Warwickshire Fusiliers and the Lancashire Fusiliers – to form a new large regiment, the Royal Regiment of Fusiliers.

The Royal Fusiliers War Memorial, a monument dedicated to the almost 22,000 Royal Fusiliers who died during the First World War, stands in Holborn in the City of London.

== History ==
=== Formation ===
It was formed as a fusilier regiment in 1685 by George Legge, 1st Baron Dartmouth, from two companies of the Tower of London guard, and was originally called the Ordnance Regiment, later the Royal Regiment of Fuziliers (a variety of spellings of the word "fusilier" persisted until the 1780s, when the modern spelling was formalised). Most regiments were equipped with matchlock muskets at the time, but the Ordnance Regiment were armed with flintlock fusils. This was because their task was to be an escort for the artillery, for which matchlocks would have carried the risk of igniting the open-topped barrels of gunpowder. The regiment was also known by the names of its colonels until 1751.

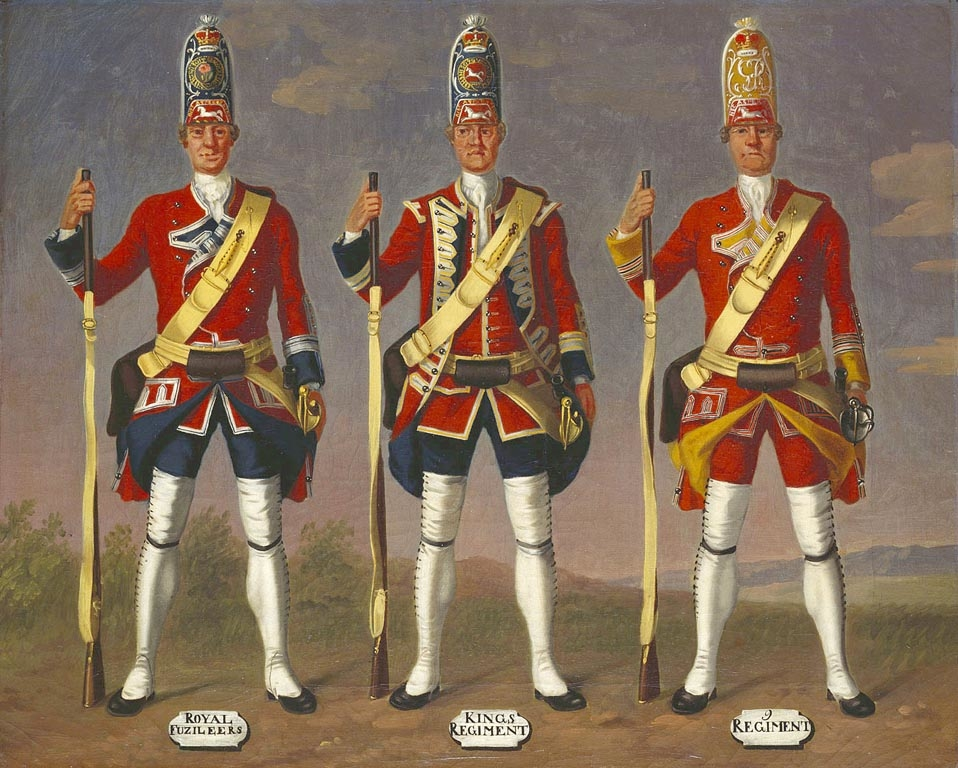
c. 1751 painting of a regimental grenadier (left)

The regiment went to Holland in February 1689 for service in the Nine Years' War and fought at the Battle of Walcourt in August 1689 before returning home in 1690. It embarked for Flanders later that year and fought at the Battle of Steenkerque in August 1692 and the Battle of Landen in July 1693 and the Siege of Namur in summer 1695 before returning home. The regiment took part in an expedition which captured the town of Rota in Spain in spring 1702 and then saw action at the Battle of Vigo Bay in October 1702 during the War of the Spanish Succession. The regiment served as Marines aboard Royal Navy ships in 1703 (and again in 1718–18, April 1742 (details only), and 1756–57).

In 1747 the regiment was known as the Royal English Fuziliers and was given the precedence of 7th in the Infantry of the Line. On 1 July 1751 it was redesignated as the 7th Regiment of Foot (Royal Fusiliers). When county titles were added in August 1782 the subtitle '(Derbyshire)' was added, but this was never used and was later given to a different regiment.

=== American War of Independence ===
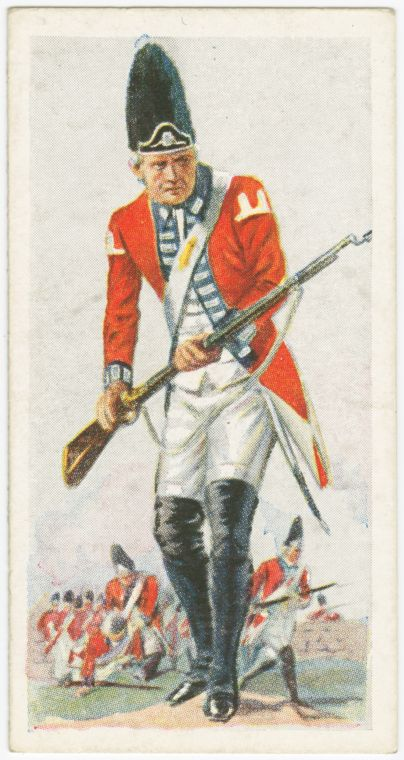
Cigarette card of regimental grenadiers in 1770

The Royal Fusiliers were sent to Canada in April 1773. The regiment was broken up into detachments that served at Montreal, Quebec, Fort Chambly and Fort St Johns (Saint-Jean-sur-Richelieu). In the face of the American invasion of Canada in 1775/76, the 80 man garrison of Fort Chambly attempted to resist a 400-man Rebel force but ultimately had to surrender, losing its regimental colours as a result. The bulk of the regiment was captured when St John's fell. A 70-man detachment under the command of Captain Humphrey Owens assisted with the Battle of Quebec in December 1775.

The men taken prisoner during the defence of Canada were exchanged in British held New York City in December 1776. Here, the regiment was rebuilt and garrisoned New York and New Jersey. In October 1777, the 7th participated in the successful assaults on Fort Clinton and Fort Montgomery and the destruction of enemy stores at Continental Village. In late November, 1777 the regiment reinforced the garrison of Philadelphia. During the British evacuation back to New York City, the regiment participated in a diversionary raid in the days leading up to the Battle of Monmouth in June 1778. The 7th participated in Tryon's raid in July 1779.

In April 1780, the Royal Fusiliers took part in the capture of Charleston. Once Charleston fell, the regiment helped garrison the city. Three companies were sent to Ninety-Six to assist with the training of Loyalist militia companies. An 80-man detachment also sent to Camden, South Carolina to help build that town's defences. The detachments were recalled to Charleston for refitting in late August 1780. They were then mounted and sent to join Charles Cornwallis's Army as it advanced towards Charlotte, North Carolina in early September 1780. The 7th, mounted on horses, along with two regiments of Loyalist militia, cleared the region north of Georgetown, South Carolina of partisans while en route. The Royal Fusiliers turned the horses over to Lieutenant Colonel Banastre Tarleton's British Legion upon uniting with Cornwallis in late September and then served as the Army's rearguard.

Between October 1780 and early January 1781, the regiment, having lost about one third of its officers and men to sickness and disease, protected the communication and supply lines between Camden and Winnsboro, South Carolina. On 7 January 7, 1781, a contingent of 171 men from the Royal Fusiliers was detached from Cornwallis's Army and fought under the command of Tarleton at the Battle of Cowpens in January 1781. The Royal Fusiliers were on the left of the line of battle: Tarleton was defeated and the regiment's colours were once again captured, stored in the baggage wagons. A 19-man detachment from the regiment fought through North Carolina participating in the Battle of Guilford Court House in March 1781 and ultimately the Siege of Yorktown, where it served with the regiment's Light Infantry Company. There was another detachment, composed largely of men recovered from the hospital and recruits, which remained in the South under the command of Lt Col. Alured Clarke: these men remained in garrison in Charleston, until they were transferred to Savannah, Georgia in December 1781. The regiment returned to England in 1783.

=== Napoleonic Wars ===
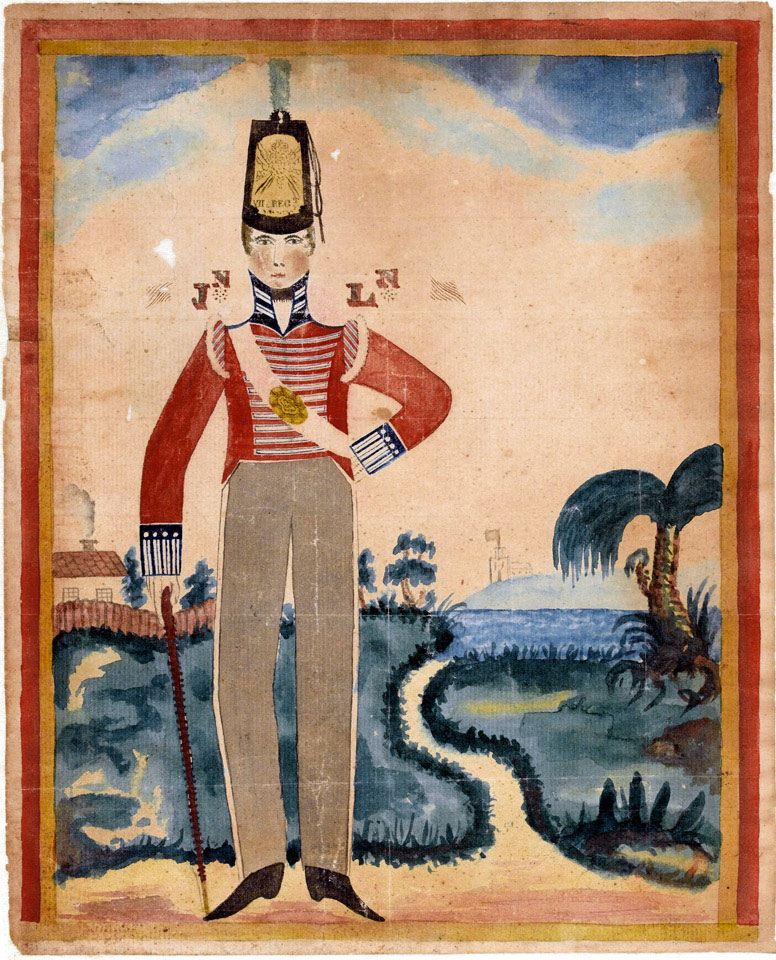
c. 1805 watercolour of a regimental private

The regiment embarked for Holland and saw action at the Battle of Copenhagen in August 1807 during the Gunboat War. It was then sent to the West Indies and took part in the capture of Martinique in 1809. It embarked for Portugal later that year for service in the Peninsular War and fought at the Battle of Talavera in July 1809, the Battle of Bussaco in September 1810. and the Battle of Albuera in May 1811.

The regiment then took part in the Siege of Ciudad Rodrigo in January 1812, the Siege of Badajoz in spring 1812 and the Battle of Salamanca in July 1812 as well as the Battle of Vitoria in June 1813. It then pursued the French Army into France and fought at the Battle of the Pyrenees in July 1813, the Battle of Orthez in February 1814 and the Battle of Toulouse in April 1814. It returned to England later that year before embarking for Canada and seeing action at the capture of Fort Bowyer in February 1815 during the War of 1812.

A 2nd Battalion was formed in 1804 and also took part in the Peninsular Campaign from 1809 to 1811. Both battalions took part in the 1811 Battle of Albuera. The 2nd Battalion was disbanded after the war.

=== Victorian and Edwardian eras ===
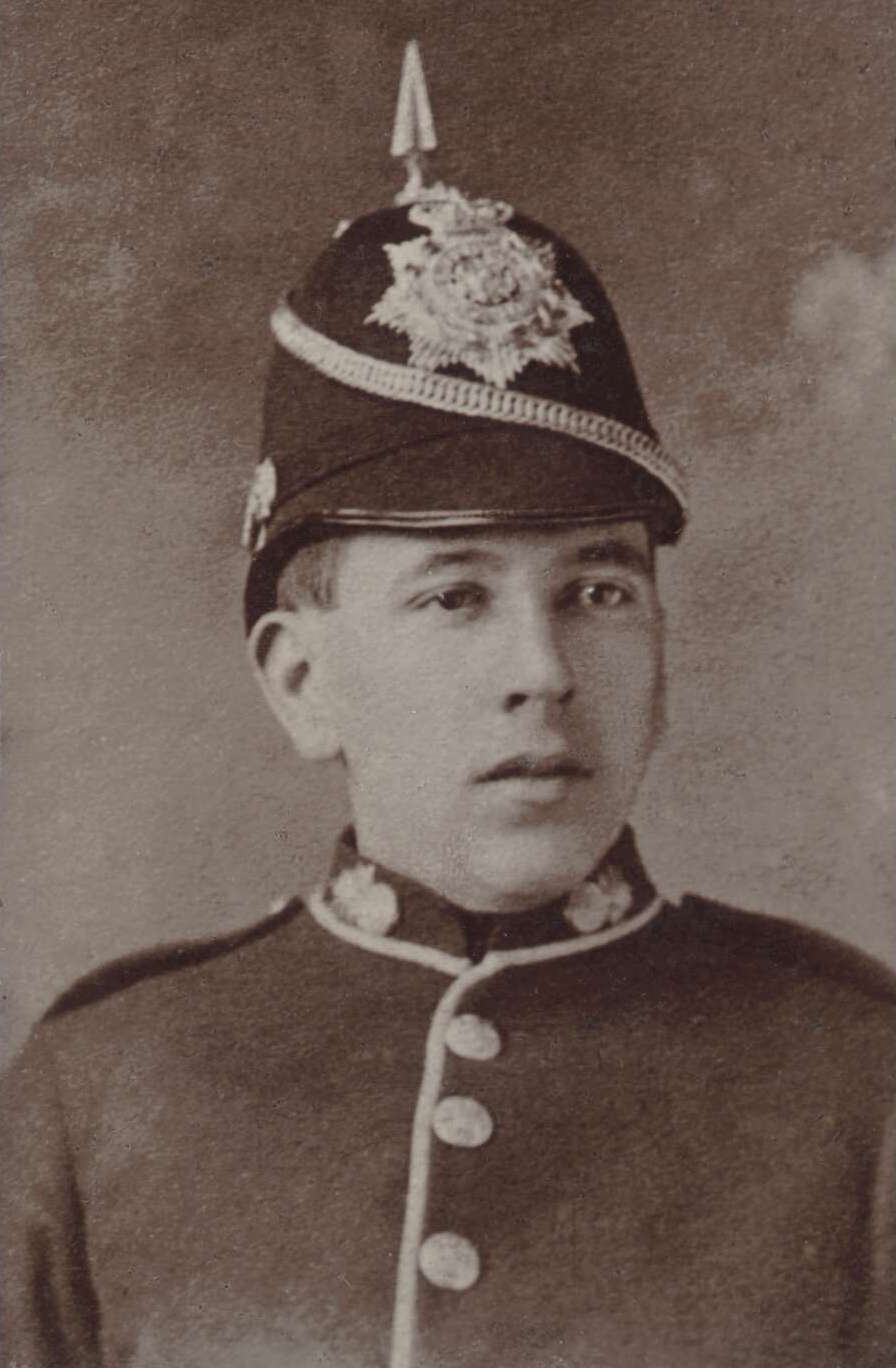
Billy Hughes in his Royal Fusiliers uniform, c. 1880

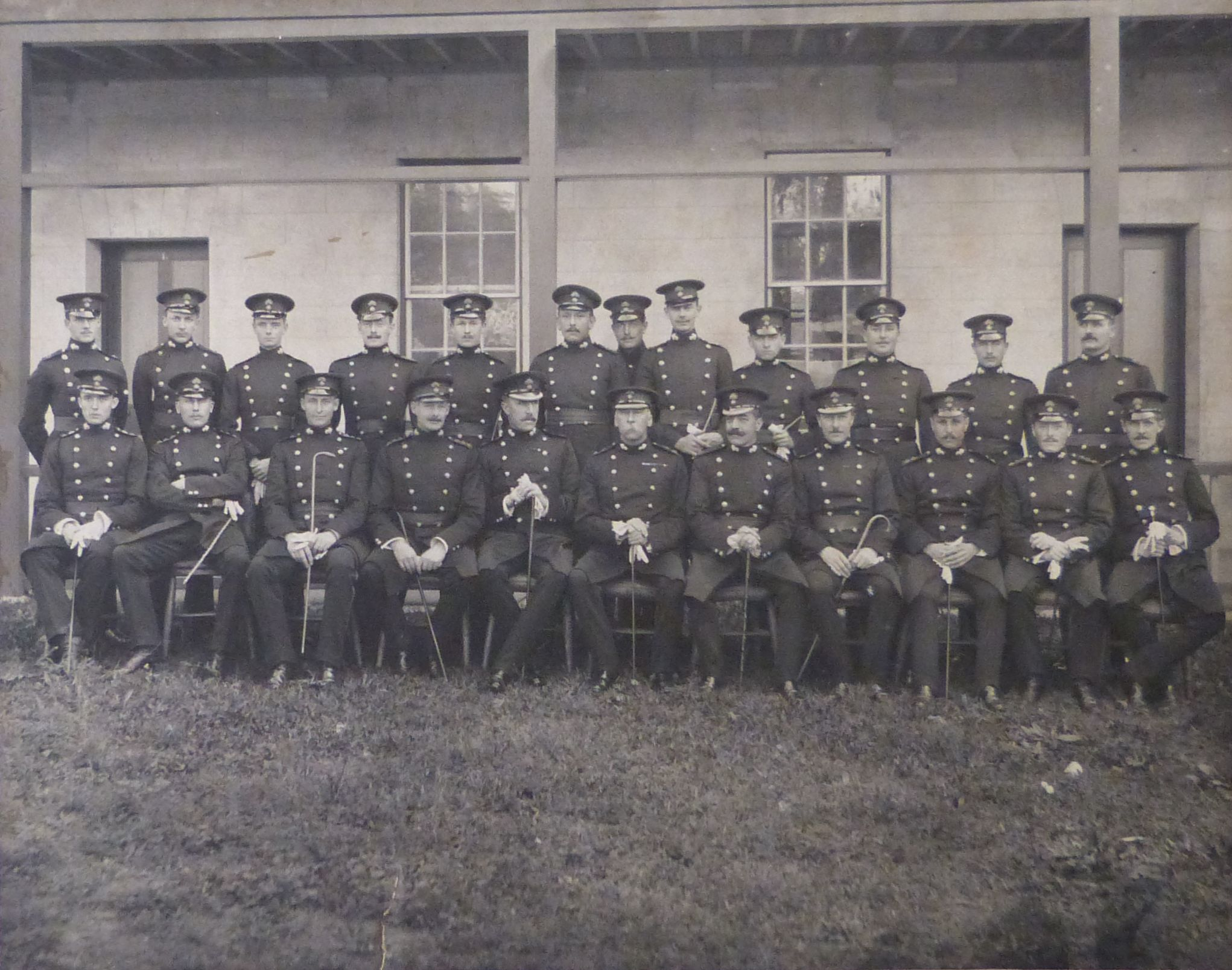
Royal Fusiliers officers in Bermuda, 1905

The single-battalion Regiment embarked for Scutari for service in the Crimean War on 5 April 1854 (with the Depot at Winchester), and saw action at the Battle of Alma in September 1854, the Battle of Inkerman in November 1854 and the Siege of Sebastopol in winter 1854. It returned to Britain from the Crimea on 27 June 1856, embarked for India on 21 July 1857, and took part in the Ambela Campaign in 1863. In 1865 it was at Ferozepore. It returned to Britain from India on the 27 December 1870. It embarked for Gibraltar in 1885, and in 1886 and 1887 was at Egypt. From 1888 until 1901, it was posted to various locations in India, including Poona, Karachi (now in Pakistan), Mhow, Nusseerabad, Bombay, Quetta, Bengal, Neemuch, and Nusserabad.

The newly re-formed 2nd battalion, which had been at Preston, embarked for Gibraltar on 27 May 1858 (the Depot at this point was at Chatham, moving to Walmer). It was deployed from Malta to Upper Canada in October 1866 and helped suppress the Fenian raids and then embarked for India on 1 October 1873, and saw action at the Battle of Kandahar in September 1880 during the Second Anglo-Afghan War. It was subsequently stationed at various locations in India, including Cannanore, Madras, Wellington, before returning to Britain from India on 29 March 1889, when it was posted to Dover. In 1892 it moved to Woolwich. In 1894 it was posted to Guernsey, and in 1896 to Belfast, Ireland. In 1898 it moved to the Curragh, Ireland.

The regiment was not fundamentally affected by the Cardwell Reforms of the 1870s, which gave it a depot at Hounslow Barracks from 1873, or by the Childers reforms of 1881 – as it already possessed two battalions, there was no need for it to amalgamate with another regiment. Under the reforms, the regiment became The Royal Fusiliers (City of London Regiment) on 1 July 1881. The regiment was now organised into the following:

Regulars

- 1st Battalion, in 1881 based at Defensible Barracks, Pembroke Dock
- 2nd Battalion, in 1881 based in Madras

Militia

- 3rd (later 5th) (Militia) Battalion based in Brentford, formerly 3rd Royal Westminster Middlesex Militia
- 4th (later 6th) (Militia) Battalion based in Finsbury, formerly Royal London Militia
- 5th (later 7th) (Militia) Battalion based in Hounslow, formerly 4th Royal South Middlesex Militia

Volunteer Infantry

- 10th Middlesex Rifle Volunteer Corps based in Bloomsbury, formerly under command of The King's Royal Rifle Corps, but transferred in 1883, and subsequently renamed as 1st Volunteer Btn
- 23rd Middlesex Rifle Volunteer Corps based in Westminster renamed 2nd Volunteer Btn in 1883

In 1901 the 1st Battalion moved from India to Mandalay, Burma.

The regiment's 2nd regular battalion took part in the Second Boer War from 1899 to 1902. The battalion, which had previously been stationed the Curragh in Ireland, embarked for South Africa on the 22 October 1899, and served there throughout the war, which ended with the Peace of Vereeniging in June 1902. Four months later 350 officers and men of the 2nd battalion left Cape Town on the SS Salamis in late September 1902, arriving at Southampton in late October, when the battalion was posted to Aldershot.

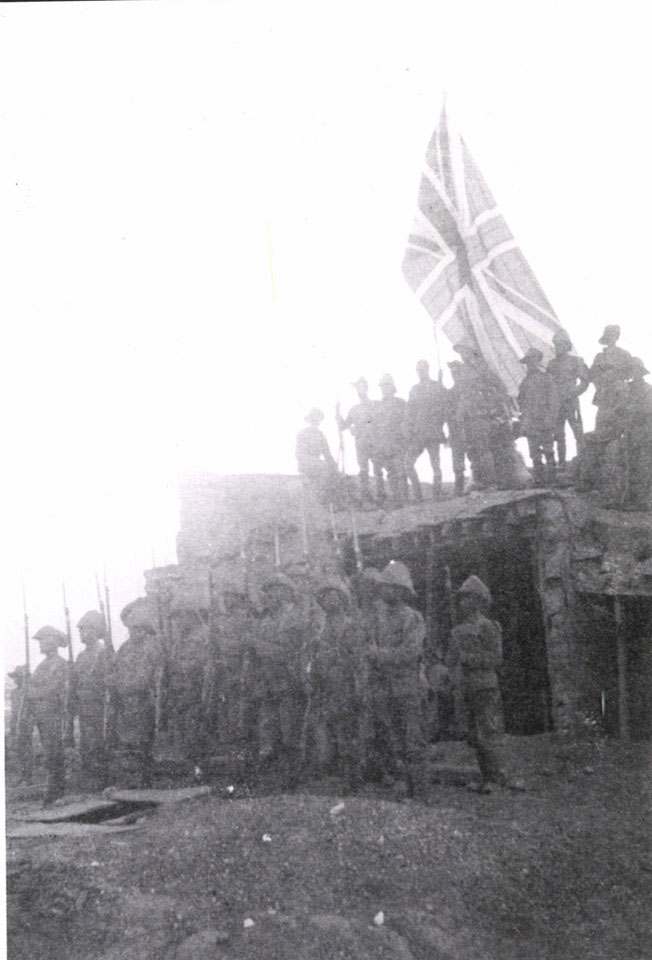
Royal Fusiliers presenting arms in Tibet, 1904

A 3rd regular battalion was formed on 6 April 1898 at Dover and embarked for the Imperial fortress of Malta on 1 December 1898, then moved to Crete, the Imperial fortress of Gibraltar in 1900, and Egypt and Sudan in 1901. It was subsequently posted to the Bermuda Garrison, with 16 officers, 1 warrant officer, and 937 NCOs and men arriving at the Imperial fortress of Bermuda under Lieutenant-Colonel R. B. Gaisford, CMG, from Egypt aboard the SS Dunera, and Majors CJ Stanton, FMF Scoones, Lieutenant F. Moore, and Second-Lieutenant GE Hawes arriving aboard the SS Dominion, in the week ending Saturday, 5 December 1903. the battalion replaced the Royal Warwickshire Regiment at Boaz Island, and departed Bermuda again for Cape Town, South Africa, aboard the HMT Soudan on the 18 December 1905 (minus Private David FW Dobson, absent without leave). The battalion was in South Africa and Mauritius until the First World War.

A 4th regular battalion was formed in February 1900 at Dover, and received colours from the Prince of Wales (Colonel-in-Chief of the regiment) in July 1902. In 1903 it was at Woolwich. In 1908, the Volunteers and Militia were reorganised nationally, with the former becoming the Territorial Force and the latter the Special Reserve. The Royal Fusiliers' 1st to 4th Volunteer Battalions were transferred to the new all-territorial London Regiment, with the Royal Fusiliers itself now consisting of:

Regulars

- 1st Battalion in 1908 based at Albany Barracks, thereafter sent to Kinsale.
- 2nd Battalion in 1908 based in Jubbulpore
- 3rd Battalion formed in 1898, in 1908 based in Mauritius and South Africa, thereafter sent to Meerut.
- 4th Battalion formed in 1900, in 1908 based at Columb Barracks. Thereafter sent to Aldershot, then garrisoned Albany Barracks at Parkhurst from 27 January 1913.

Special Reserve

- 5th (Reserve) Battalion, based in Hounslow, former 5th (Militia) Battalion
- 6th (Reserve) Battalion, based in Hounslow, former 7th (Militia) Battalion
- 7th (Extra Reserve) Battalion, based in Finsbury, former 6th (Militia) Battalion

=== First World War ===
==== Regular Army ====
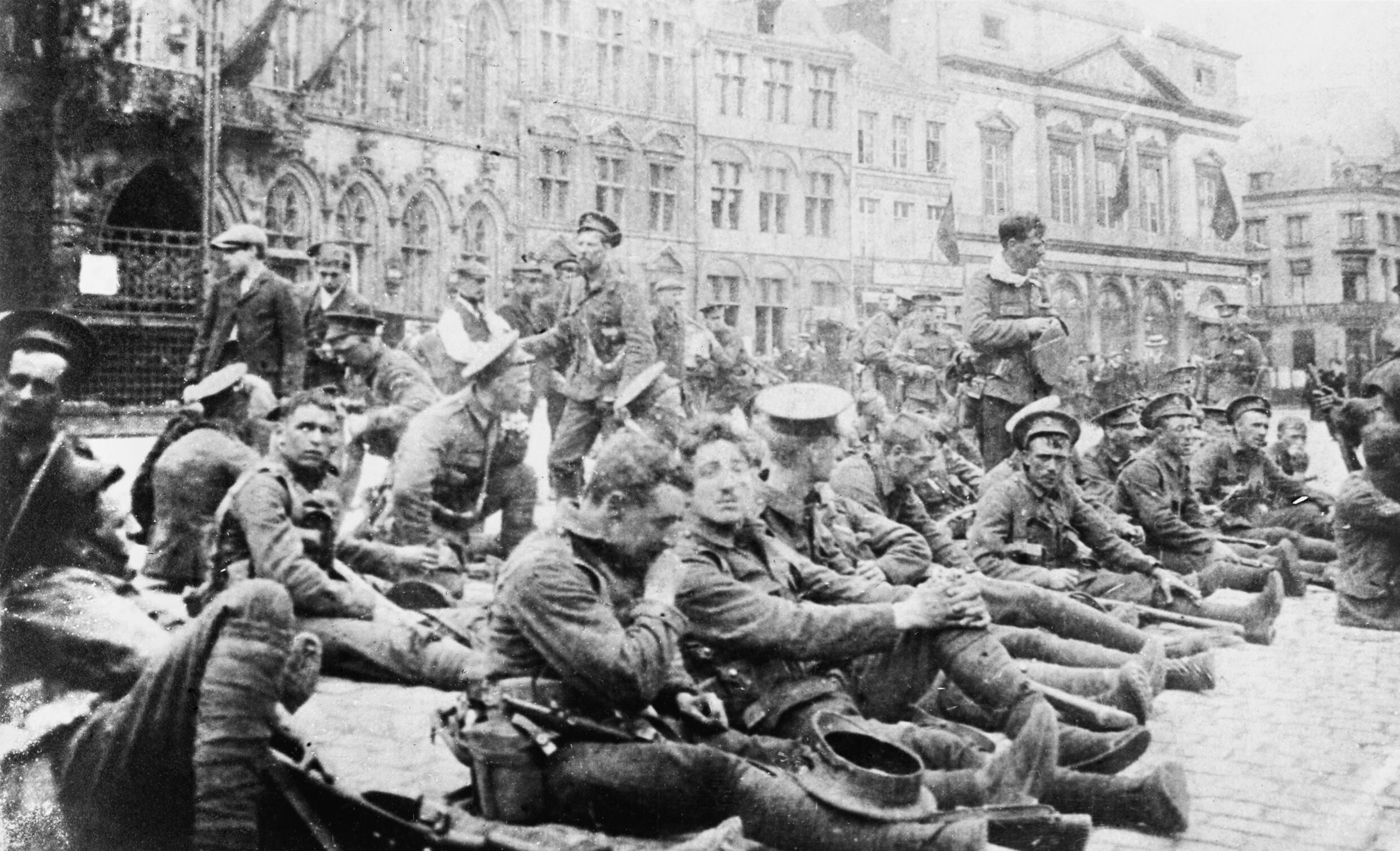
Royal Fusiliers resting in Mons, 22 August 1914

The 1st Battalion landed at Saint-Nazaire as part of the 17th Brigade in the 6th Division in September 1914 for service on the Western Front; major engagements involving the battalion included the Battle of the Somme in autumn 1916 and the Battle of Passchendaele in autumn 1917.

The 2nd Battalion landed at Gallipoli as part of the 86th Brigade in the 29th Division in April 1915; after being evacuated in December 1915, it moved to Egypt in March 1916 and then landed in Marseille in March 1916 for service on the Western Front; major engagements involving the battalion included the Battle of the Somme in autumn 1916 and the Battle of Arras in spring 1917.

The 3rd Battalion landed at Le Havre as part of the 85th Brigade in the 28th Division in January 1915; major engagements involving the battalion included the Second Battle of Ypres in April 1915 and the Battle of Loos in September 1915. The battalion moved to Egypt in October 1915 and then to Salonika in July 1918, before returning to the Western Front.

The 4th Battalion landed at Le Havre as part of the 9th Brigade in the 3rd Division in August 1914 for service on the Western Front; major engagements involving the battalion included the Battle of Mons and the Battle of Le Cateau in August 1914, the First Battle of the Marne and the First Battle of the Aisne in September 1914 and the Battle of La Bassée, the Battle of Messines and the First Battle of Ypres in October 1914. Members of the battalion won the first two Victoria Crosses of the war near Mons in August 1914 (Lieutenant Maurice Dease and Private Sidney Godley).

==== New Armies ====
The Royal Fusiliers marching through the City of London in 1916

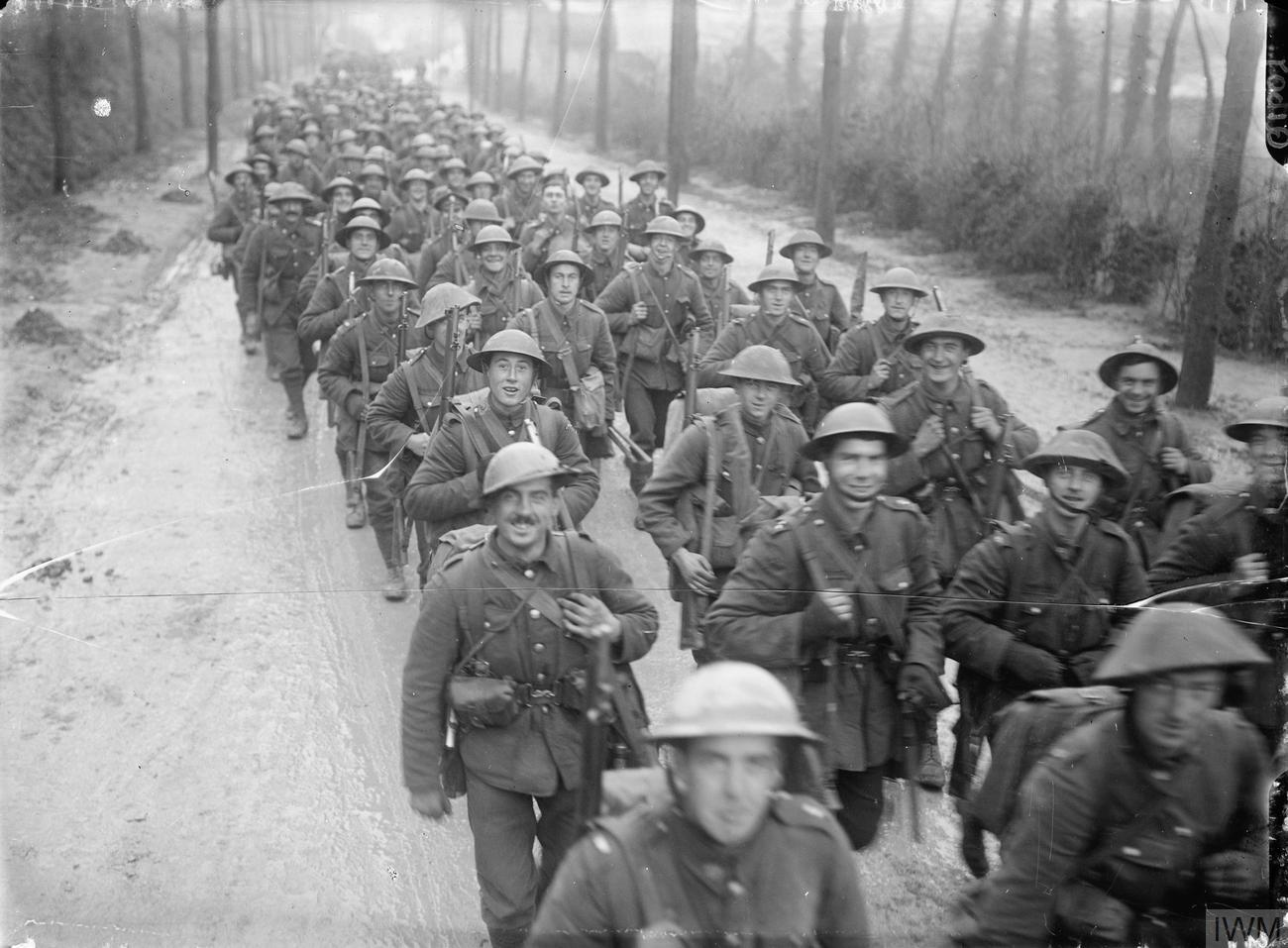
Men of the 10th (Service) Battalion, Royal Fusiliers (Stockbrokers) marching to the trenches, St Pol (Saint-Pol-sur-Ternoise), France, November 1916.

The 8th and 9th (Service) Battalions landed in France; they both saw action on the Western Front as part of the 36th Brigade of the 12th (Eastern) Division.

The 10th (Service) Battalion, better known as the Stockbrokers' Battalion, was formed in August 1914 when 1,600 members of the London Stock Exchange and others from the area joined up: 742 were killed or missing in action on the Western Front. The battalion was originally part of the 54th Brigade of the 18th (Eastern) Division, transferring to the 111th Brigade, 37th Division.

The 11th, 12th, 13th and 17th (Service) battalions landed in France; all four battalions saw action on the Western Front: the 11th Battalion being part of the 54th Brigade, 18th (Eastern) Division, the 12th with the 73rd Brigade, later the 17th Brigade, 24th Division, the 13th with the 111th Brigade, 37th Division and the 17th with the 99th Brigade, 33rd Division, later transferring to the 5th and 6th Brigades of the 2nd Division.

The 18th–21st (Service) Battalions (1st–4th Public Schools) of the regiment were recruited from public schools; all four battalions saw action on the Western Front, all originally serving with the 98th Brigade in the 33rd Division, the 18th and 20th Battalions transferring to the 19th Brigade in the same division.

The 22nd (Service) Battalion, which was recruited from the citizens of Kensington, also landed in France and saw action on the Western Front.

The 23rd and 24th (Service) Battalion, better known as the Sportsmen's Battalions, also landed in France and saw action on the Western Front: they were among the Pals battalions and were both part of the 99th Brigade of the 33rd Division, later transferring to command of the 2nd Division, with the 24th Battalion joining the 5th Brigade in the same division.

The 25th (Frontiersmen) Battalion, Royal Fusiliers, formed in February 1915, served in East Africa.

The 26th (Service) Battalion was recruited from the banking community; it saw action on the Western Front as part of the 124th Brigade of the 41st Division.

The 32nd (Service) Battalion, which was recruited from the citizens of East Ham, also landed in France and saw action on the Western Front as part of the 124th Brigade of the 41st Division.

The 38th through 42nd Battalions of the regiment served as the Jewish Legion in Palestine; many of its surviving members went on to be part of the founding of the State of Israel in 1948.

The Royal Fusiliers War Memorial, stands on High Holborn, near Chancery Lane Underground station, surmounted by the lifesize statue of a First World War soldier, and its regimental chapel is at St Sepulchre-without-Newgate.

=== Russian Civil War ===
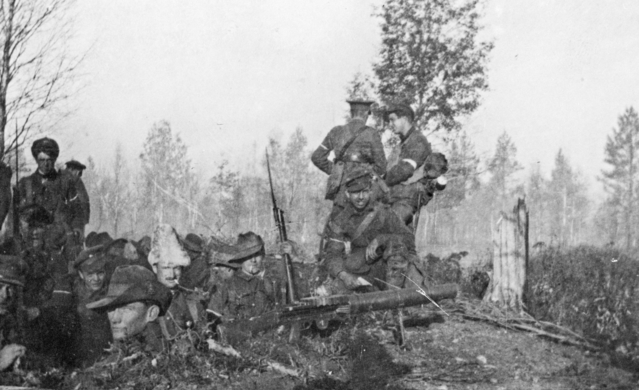
Unidentified members of the 45th Battalion, Royal Fusiliers, taking a smoke break. Australian members of the battalion retained their former AIF uniforms while in Russia. One of the men to the left is wearing a fur hat.

The 45th and 46th Battalions of the Royal Fusiliers were part of the North Russia Relief Force, which landed in early 1919 to support the withdrawal of international forces assisting "White" (anti-Bolshevik) Russian forces during the Russian Civil War. The understrength 45th Battalion was composed mainly of former members of the Australian Imperial Force – many of them veterans of the Western Front – who had volunteered for service in Russia.

=== Interwar ===
The 3rd and 4th Battalions were disbanded at Aldershot on 15 July 1922. The London Regiment having fallen into abeyance, the 1st–4th Londons reverted to their Royal Fusiluers affiliation. When the London Regiment was formally abolished they became the 8th (1st City of London), 9th (2nd City of London) and 10th (3rd City of London) Battalions (the 4th Londons had already been converted into 60th (City of London) Heavy Anti-Aircraft Regiment, Royal Artillery). In the period of rearmament before the outbreak of World War II, the 8th and 9th Battalions each formed a duplicate battalion (11th and 12th respectively) while 10th Battalion was converted into 69th (3rd City of London) Searchlight Regiment, Royal Artillery.

=== Second World War ===
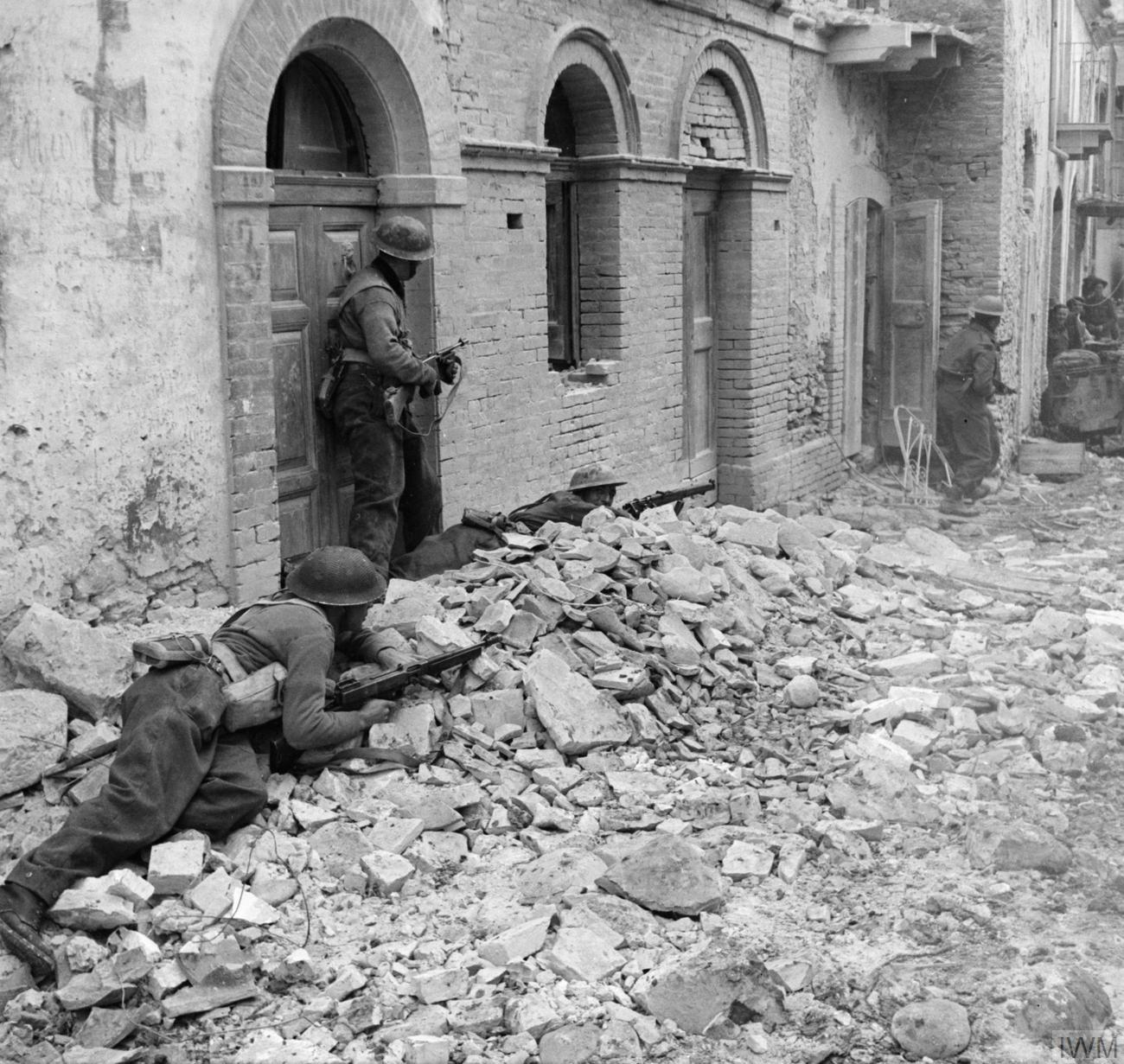
Infantrymen of the 1st Battalion, Royal Fusiliers reconstruct a street-fighting scene in a street in Caldari, Italy, 17 December 1943.

For most of the Second World War, the 1st Battalion was part of the 17th Indian Infantry Brigade, 8th Indian Infantry Division. It served with them in the Italian Campaign.

The 2nd Battalion was attached to the 12th Infantry Brigade, 4th Infantry Division and was sent to France in 1939 after the outbreak of war to join the British Expeditionary Force (BEF). In May 1940, it fought in the Battle of France and was forced to retreat to Dunkirk, where it was then evacuated from France. With the brigade and division, the battalion spent the next two years in the United Kingdom, before being sent overseas to fight in the Tunisia Campaign, part of the final stages of the North African Campaign. Alongside the 1st, 8th and 9th battalions, the 2nd Battalion also saw active service in the Italian Campaign from March 1944, in particular during the Battle of Monte Cassino, fighting later on the Gothic Line before being airlifted to fight in the Greek Civil War.

The 8th and 9th Battalions, the two Territorial Army (TA) units, were part of the 1st London Infantry Brigade, attached to 1st London Infantry Division. These later became the 167th (London) Infantry Brigade and 56th (London) Infantry Division. Both battalions saw service in the final stages of the Tunisian campaign, where each suffered over 100 casualties in their first battle. In September 1943, both battalions were heavily involved in the landings at Salerno, as part of the Allied invasion of Italy, later crossing the Volturno Line, before, in December, being held up at the Winter Line. Both battalions then fought in the Battle of Monte Cassino and were sent to the Anzio beachhead in February 1944.

The duplicate TA battalions, the 11th and 12th, were both assigned to 4th London Infantry Brigade, part of 2nd London Infantry Division, later 140th (London) Infantry Brigade and 47th (London) Infantry Division respectively. Both battalions remained in the United Kingdom on home defence duties. In 1943, the 12th Battalion was transferred to the 80th Infantry (Reserve) Division and later to the 47th Infantry (Reserve) Division.

The regiment raised many other battalions during the war, although none of them saw active service overseas in their original roles, instead some were converted. The 20th Battalion, for example, formed soon after the Dunkirk evacuation, was sent to India in the summer of 1942 and later became part of the 52nd Infantry Brigade, acting in a training capacity to train British troops in jungle warfare for service in the Burma Campaign. The 21st and 23rd Battalions, also created in June/July 1940, were later converted into 54th and 46th Battalions, Reconnaissance Corps, assigned to the 54th (East Anglian) and 46th Infantry Divisions respectively; the 54th later formed the bulk of 15th Scottish Reconnaissance Regiment, while the 46th servied with its parent division for the rest of the war. 14th (Overseas Defence) and 22nd Battalions became 107th Light Anti-Aircraft and 94th Anti-Tank Regiments respectively of the Royal Artillery.

=== Korean War ===
In August 1952, the regiment, now reduced to a single Regular battalion, served in the Korean War as part of the 28th Commonwealth Infantry Brigade. A 19-year-old Michael Caine served with the battalion during the conflict; on several occasions his unit had to defend itself from Chinese human wave attacks.

=== Amalgamation ===
On 23 April 1968, the regiment was merged with the Royal Northumberland Fusiliers (5th Foot), the Royal Warwickshire Fusiliers (6th Foot) and the Lancashire Fusiliers (20th Foot) to form the 3rd Battalion, Royal Regiment of Fusiliers.

== Regimental museum ==
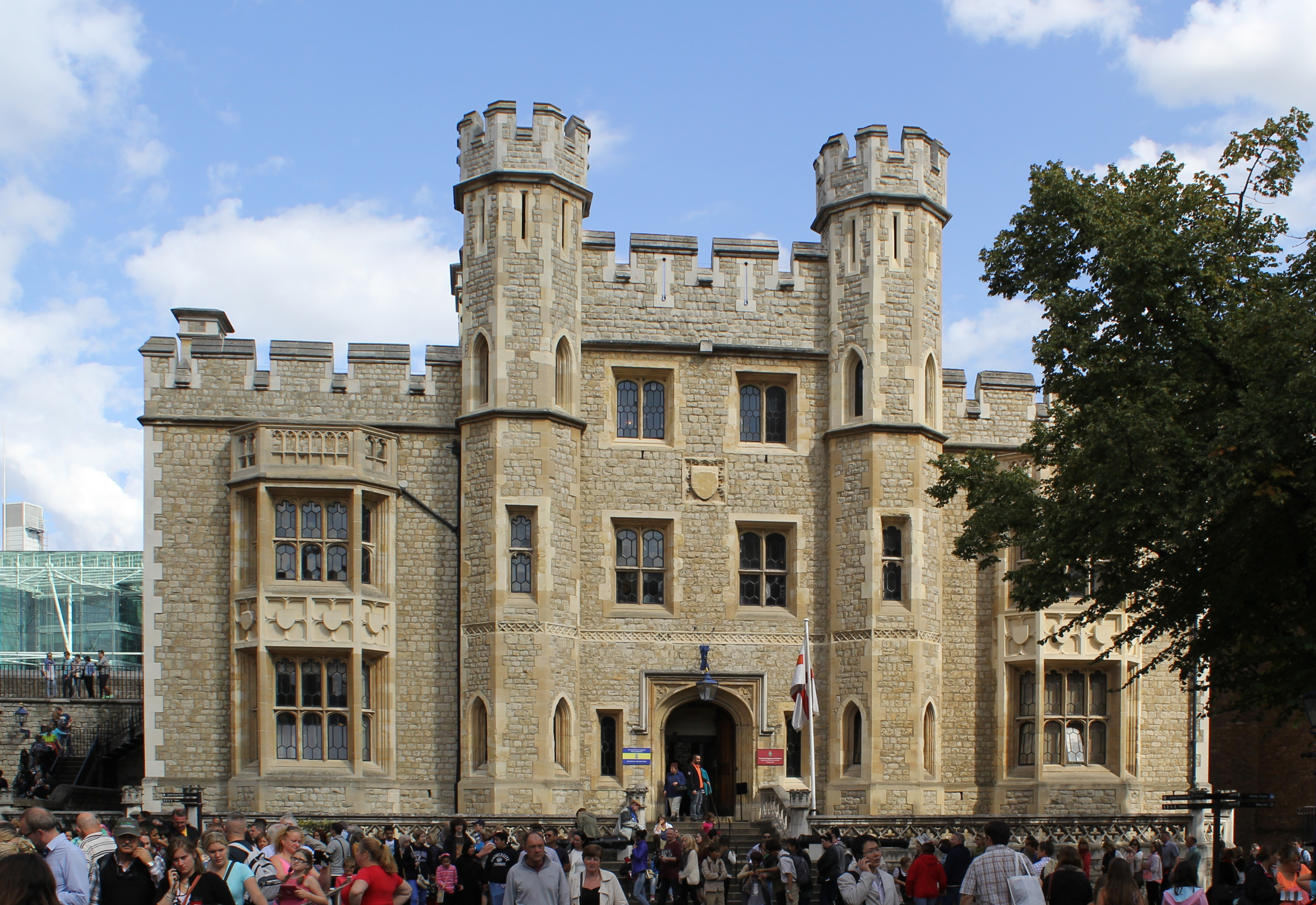
Royal Fusiliers Regimental Museum, August 2014

The Fusilier Museum is located in the Royal Regiment of Fusiliers Headquarters at HM Tower of London. It also represents World War One soldiers of six London Regiment battalions (1st, 2nd, 3rd, 4th, 29th and 30th) which had been attached to the Royal Fusiliers prior to 1908.

== Battle honours ==
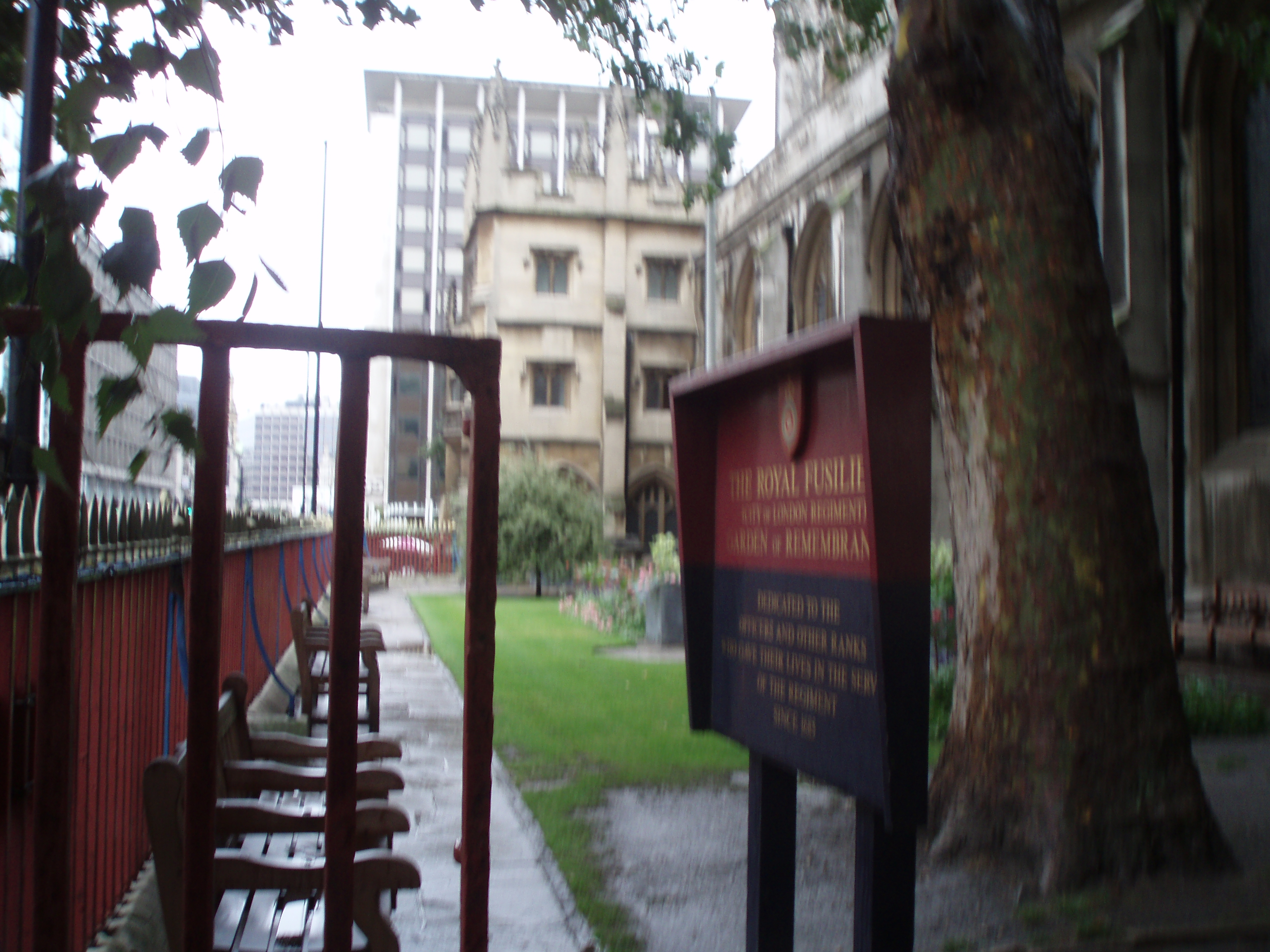
The Garden of Remembrance at St Sepulchre's Church was originally meant as a memorial to Fusiliers killed in the two World Wars but is now dedicated to all Fusiliers killed in action since 1914

The regiment's battle honours included:

- Earlier Wars: Namur 1695, Martinique 1809, Talavera, Busaco, Albuhera, Badajoz, Salamanca, Vittoria, Pyrenees, Orthes, Toulouse, Peninsula, Alma, Inkerman, Sevastopol, Kandahar 1880, Afghanistan 1879–80, Relief of Ladysmith, South Africa 1899–1902
- The First World War (47 battalions): Mons, Le Cateau, Retreat from Mons, Marne 1914, Aisne 1914, La Bassée 1914, Messines 1914 '17, Armentières 1914, Ypres 1914 '15 '17 '18, Nonne Bosschen, Gravenstafel, St. Julien, Frezenberg, Bellewaarde, Hooge 1915, Loos, Somme 1916 '18, Albert 1916 '18, Bazentin, Delville Wood, Pozières, Flers-Courcelette, Thiepval, Le Transloy, Ancre Heights, Ancre 1916 '18, Arras 1917 '18, Vimy 1917, Scarpe 1917, Arleux, Pilckem, Langemarck 1917, Menin Road, Polygon Wood, Broodseinde, Poelcappelle, Passchendaele, Cambrai 1917 '18, St. Quentin, Bapaume 1918, Rosières, Avre, Villers Bretonneux, Lys, Estaires, Hazebrouck, Béthune, Amiens, Drocourt-Quéant, Hindenburg Line, Havrincourt, Épéhy, Canal du Nord, St. Quentin Canal, Beaurevoir, Courtrai, Selle, Sambre, France and Flanders 1914–18, Italy 1917–18, Struma, Macedonia 1915–18, Helles, Landing at Helles, Krithia, Suvla, Scimitar Hill, Gallipoli 1915–16, Egypt 1916, Megiddo, Nablus, Palestine 1918, Troitsa, Archangel 1919, Kilimanjaro, Behobeho, Nyangao, East Africa 1915–17
- The Second World War: Dunkirk 1940, North-West Europe 1940, Agordat, Keren, Syria 1941, Sidi Barrani, Djebel Tebaga, Peter's Corner, North Africa 1940 '43, Sangro, Mozzagrogna, Caldari, Salerno, St. Lucia, Battipaglia, Teano, Monte Camino, Garigliano Crossing, Damiano, Anzio, Cassino II, Ripa Ridge, Gabbiano, Advance to Florence, Monte Scalari, Gothic Line, Coriano, Croce, Casa Fortis, Savio Bridgehead, Valli di Commacchio, Senio, Argenta Gap, Italy 1943–45, Athens, Greece 1944–45
- Korea 1952–53

== Colonels ==
=== Colonels-in-Chief ===
Colonels-in-Chief have included:

- 1900–1937: King George V
- 1937–1942: Prince George, Duke of Kent

=== Colonels ===
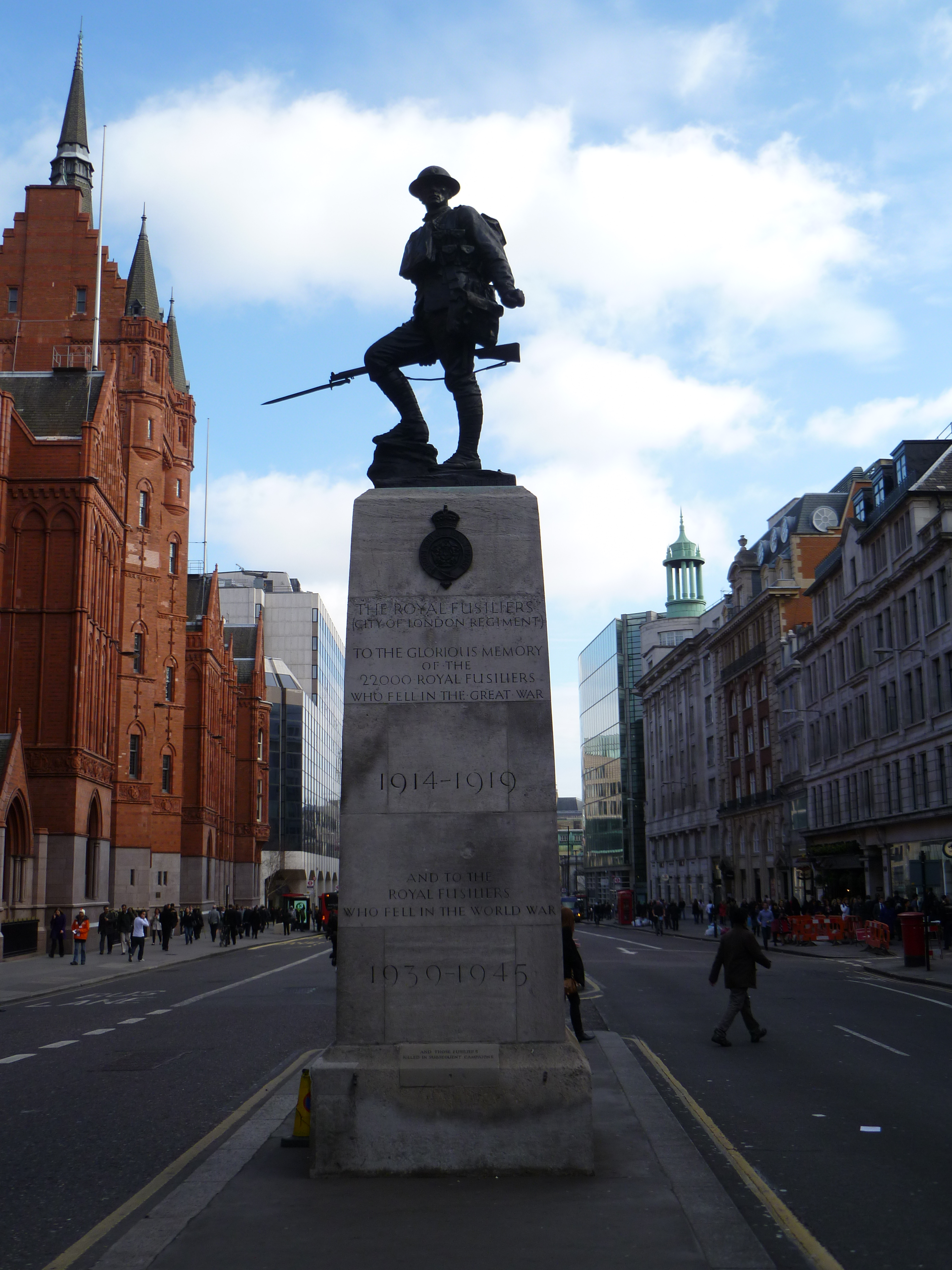
The Royal Fusiliers War Memorial on Holborn, a memorial to Royal Fusiliers killed in both the First and Second World Wars.

The colonels of the regiment included:

- 1685–1689: Lieutenant-General George Legge, 1st Baron Dartmouth
- 1689–1692: General John Churchill, 1st Duke of Marlborough
- January–July 1692 Field Marshal George Hamilton, 1st Earl of Orkney
- 1692–1696: Brigadier-General Edward Fitzpatrick
- 1696–1713: General Charles O'Hara, 1st Baron Tyrawley
- 1713–1739: Field Marshal James O'Hara, 2nd Baron Tyrawley
- 1739–1751: Lieutenant-General William Hargrave

7th Regiment of Foot (Royal Fuzileers) (1751)

- 1751–1754: General John Mostyn
- 1754–1776: Lord Robert Bertie
- 1776–1788: Lieutenant-General Richard Prescott

7th (Derbyshire) Regiment of Foot (1782)

- 1788–1789: General William Gordon
- 1789–1801: Field Marshal Prince Edward, Duke of Kent and Strathearn
- 1801–1832: Field Marshal Sir Alured Clarke
- 1832–1854: Field Marshal Sir Edward Blakeney
- 1854–1855: General Sir George Brown
- 1855–1868: General Sir Samuel Auchmuty
- 1868–1881: General Sir Richard Airey

The Royal Fusiliers (City of London Regiment) (1881)

- 1881–1900: General Sir Richard Wilbraham
- 1900–1922: Major-General Sir Geoffrey Barton
- 1922–1924: Major-General Colin Donald
- 1924–1933: Major-General Sir Reginald Pinney
- 1933–1942: Major-General Walter Hill
- July–October 1942 Brigadier Reginald Howlett
- 1942–1947: General Sir Reginald May
- 1947–1954: Major-General James Francis Harter
- 1954–1963: Major-General Francis David Rome
- 1963–1968: General Sir Kenneth Darling (to Royal Regiment of Fusiliers)
- 1968: Amalgamated with the Royal Northumberland Fusiliers, Royal Warwickshire Fusiliers and Lancashire Fusiliers to form the Royal Regiment of Fusiliers

== Victoria Cross ==
Victoria Crosses awarded to members of the regiment were:

- Private Thomas Elsdon Ashford, Second Afghan War (16 August 1880)
- Lieutenant Maurice Dease, First World War (23 August 1914)
- Temp. Lieutenant-Colonel Neville Elliott-Cooper, First World War (30 November 1917)
- Captain Charles Fitzclarence, Second Boer War (14 October 1899)
- Assistant Surgeon Thomas Egerton Hale, Crimean War (8 September 1855)
- Lieutenant William Hope, Crimean War (18 June 1855)
- Private Mathew Hughes, Crimean War (7 June 1855 and 18 June 1855)
- Captain Henry Mitchell Jones, Crimean War (7 June 1855)
- Temp. Captain Robert Gee, First World War (30 November 1917)
- Private Sidney Frank Godley, First World War (23 August 1914)
- Corporal George Jarratt, First World War (3 May 1917)
- Sergeant John Molyneux, First World War (9 October 1917)
- Private William Norman, Crimean War (19 December 1854)
- Lance-Sergeant Frederick William Palmer, First World War (16/17 February 1917)
- Sergeant Samuel George Pearse, North Russia Relief Force (29 August 1919)
- Lance-Corporal Charles Graham Robertson, First World War (8/9 March 1918)
- Acting Captain Walter Napleton Stone, First World War (30 November 1917)
- Corporal Arthur Percy Sullivan, North Russia Relief Force (10 August 1919)

== Gallery ==
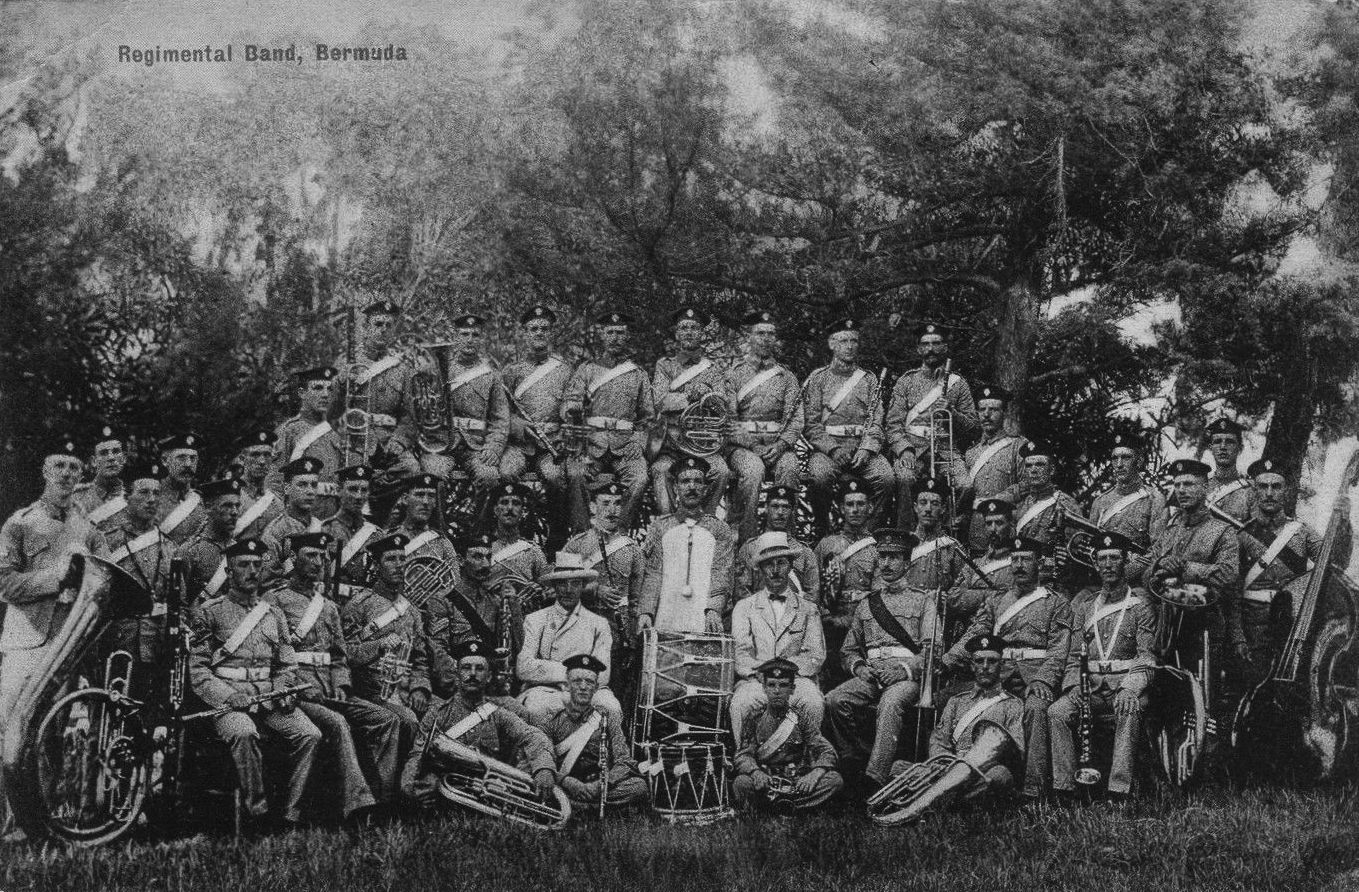
Band of the 3rd Battalion of The Royal Fusiliers in Bermuda circa 1903, while the battalion was part of the Bermuda Garrison

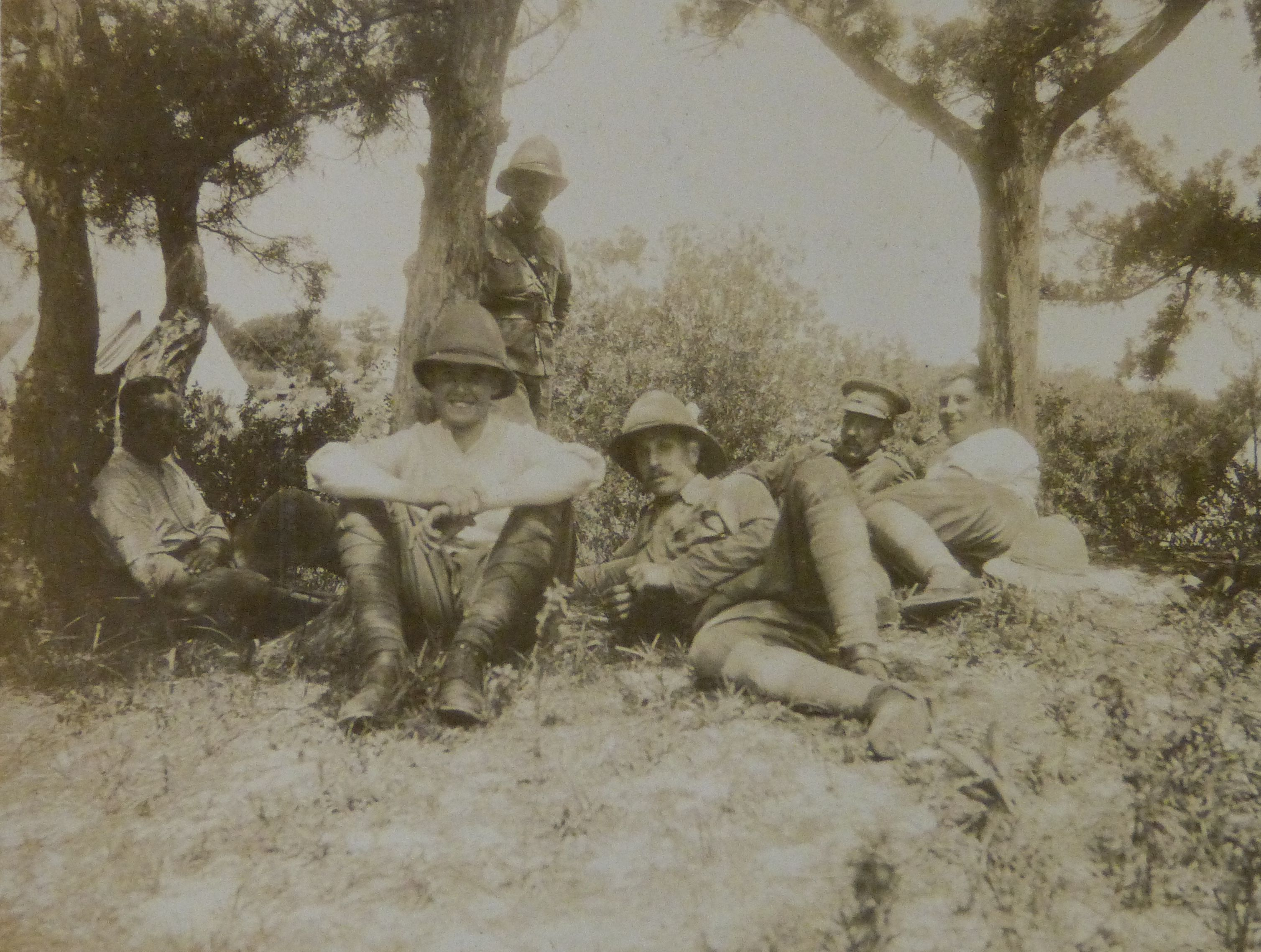
Officers of the 3rd Battalion Royal Fusiliers during Battalion Training at Tucker's Town, Bermuda, in 1904

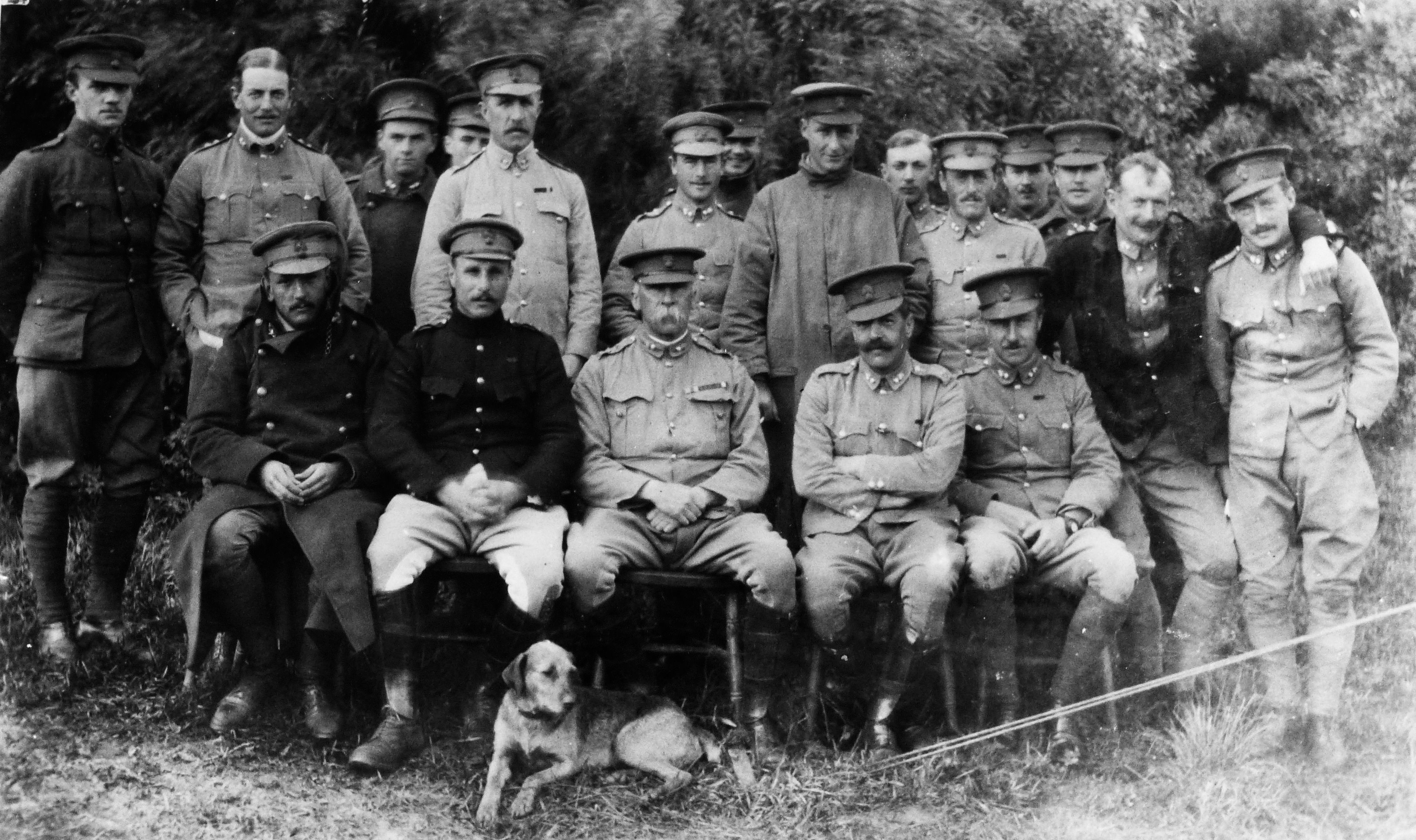
Officers of the 3rd Battalion during Battalion Training at Tucker's Town, Bermuda, 1905

== Sources ==
- Cannon, Richard (1847). "Historical Record of the Seventh Regiment, Or the Royal Fusiliers: Containing an Account of the Formation of the Regiment in 1685, and of Its Subsequent Services to 1846". Parker, Furnivall and Parker.
- J.B.M. Frederick, Lineage Book of British Land Forces 1660–1978, Vol I, Wakefield: Microform Academic, 1984, ISBN 1-85117-007-3.
- Brig E.A. James, British Regiments 1914–18, London: Samson Books, 1978, ISBN 0-906304-03-2/Uckfield: Naval & Military Press, 2001, ISBN 978-1-84342-197-9.
- Lt-Col H.F. Joslen, Orders of Battle, United Kingdom and Colonial Formations and Units in the Second World War, 1939–1945, London: HM Stationery Office, 1960/London: London Stamp Exchange, 1990, ISBN 0-948130-03-2/Uckfield: Naval & Military Press, 2003, ISBN 1-843424-74-6.
- C. Northcote Parkinson, Always a Fusilier: The War History of The Royal Fusiliers (City of London Regiment) 1939–1945, London: Sampson Low, 1949.
