= Savinskaya, Kharovsky District, Vologda Oblast =

Savinskaya Савинская
- Village
- Location within Vologda Oblast Location within Russia
- Coordinates: 59°58′N 40°30′E
- Country: Russia
- Region: Vologda Oblast
- District: Kharovsky District
- Time zone: UTC+3:00

Savinskaya (Russian: Савинская) is a rural locality (a village) in Mikhaylovskoye Rural Settlement, Kharovsky District, Vologda Oblast, Russia. The population was 6 as of 2002.

== Geography ==
Savinskaya is located 20 km northeast of Kharovsk (the district's administrative centre) by road. Panatovo is the nearest rural locality.
