= Savinskaya, Vinogradovsky District, Arkhangelsk Oblast =

Savinskaya Савинская
- Village
- Location within Arkhangelsk Oblast Location within Russia
- Coordinates: 63°03′N 42°07′E
- Country: Russia
- Region: Arkhangelsk Oblast
- District: Vinogradovsky District
- Time zone: UTC+3:00

Savinskaya (Russian: Савинская) is a rural locality (a village) in Morzhegorskoye Rural Settlement of Vinogradovsky District, Arkhangelsk Oblast, Russia. The population was 7 as of 2010.

== Geography ==
Savinskaya is located on the Severnaya Dvina River, 46 km northwest of Bereznik (the district's administrative centre) by road. Morzhegory is the nearest rural locality.
