= Yemtsa =

Rural locality in Arkhangelsk Oblast, Russia

Yemtsa Емца
- Settlement
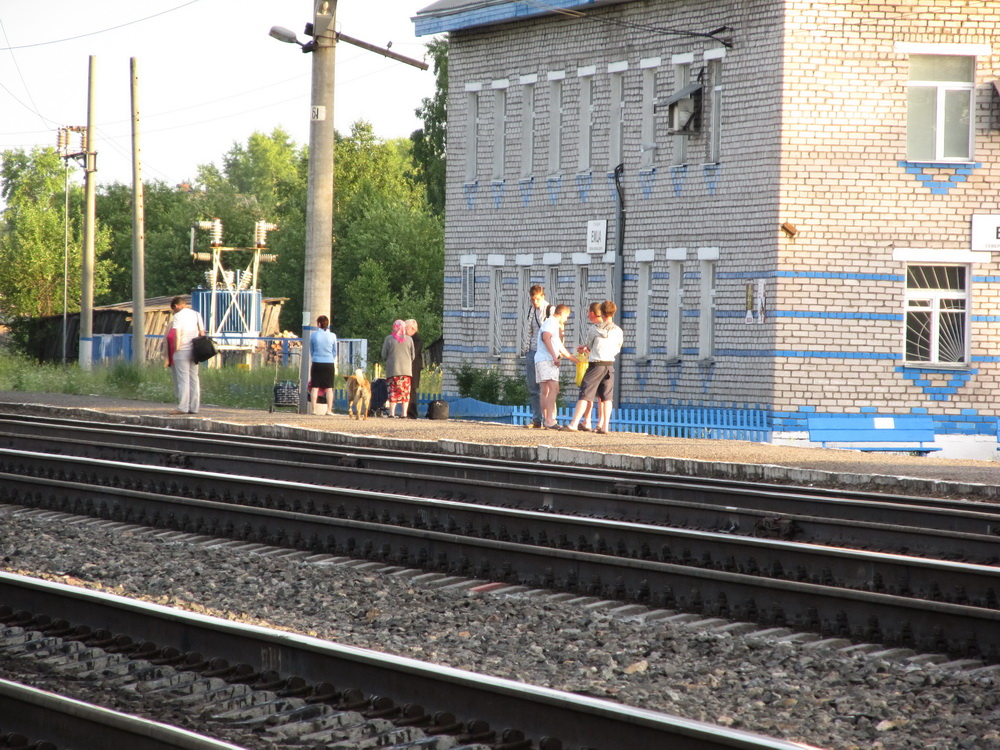
- Yemtsa railway station
- Interactive map of Yemtsa
- Location of Yemtsa Yemtsa (Arkhangelsk Oblast)
- Coordinates: 63°04′27″N 40°20′09″E
- Country: Russia
- Federal subject: Arkhangelsk Oblast
- Administrative district: Plesetsky District
- SelsovietSelsoviet: Yarnemsky Selsoviet
- Founded: 1943

Population (2010 Census)
  - Total: 1,067
  - Estimate (2013): 991 (−7.1%)

Municipal status
  - Municipal district: Plesetsky Municipal District
  - Rural settlement: Yemtsovskoye Rural Settlement
  - Capital of: Yemtsovskoye Rural Settlement
- Time zone: UTC+3 (MSK)
- Postal code: 164252
- Dialing code: +7 81832
- OKTMO ID: 11650402101

Yemtsa (Russian: Е́мца) is a rural locality (a settlement) in Plesetsky District of Arkhangelsk Oblast, Russia, located 42 kilometers (26 mi) north of Plesetsk and 172 kilometers (107 mi) south of Arkhangelsk. Within the framework of municipal divisions, it serves as the administrative center of Yemtsovskoye Rural Settlement, one of the thirteen rural settlements in the district. Population: 1,067 (2010 census); 1,498 (2002 census); 2,266 (1989 Soviet census)..

== Etymology ==
The name of the settlement is derived from the Yemtsa River, which, however, flows at some distance from the settlement.

== History ==
In 1894–1897, Yemtsa railway station was built during the construction of the railroad between Vologda and Arkhangelsk. Yemtsa was incorporated in 1943 with a decree No. 617/5 of the Presidium of the Supreme Soviet of RSFSR by merging a number of settlements. Previously, it was located on the territory of Savinsky Selsoviet, with the center in Savinsky.

During the Russian Civil War in 1918, heavy battles were fought between the Red Army and the British troops around Yemtsa. A monument to the Red Army is situated near the train station.

Yemtsa had work settlement status until it was demoted to a rural locality in February 2013.

== Economy ==
There is a railway station in Yemtsa situated on the Plesetskaya–Obozerskaya line of the railroad connecting Moscow with Arkhangelsk. Yemtsa is located on the highway connecting Kargopol with one of the principal highways in Russia, M8 between Moscow and Arkhangelsk (the highways meet in the village of Brin-Navolok northwest of Yemtsa). This is the historic trading route which connected Kargopol with Arkhangelsk before the railroad was built, and long stretches of this road are still unpaved.

The economy of the settlement is based on logging and railway transport.
