= Savinsky, Volgograd Oblast =

Savinsky Савинский
- Khutor
- Location within Volgograd Oblast Location within Russia
- Coordinates: 48°44′N 42°58′E
- Country: Russia
- Region: Volgograd Oblast
- District: Surovikinsky District
- Time zone: UTC+4:00

Savinsky (Russian: Савинский) is a rural locality (a khutor) in Dobrinskoye Rural Settlement, Surovikinsky District, Volgograd Oblast, Russia. The population was 219 as of 2010. There are 2 streets.

== Geography ==
Savinsky is located on the Levaya Dobraya River, 46 km northeast of Surovikino (the district's administrative centre) by road. Dobrinka is the nearest rural locality.
