= Savinskaya, Vladimir Oblast =

Savinskaya Савинская
- Village
- Location within Vladimir Oblast Location within Russia
- Coordinates: 55°39′N 40°23′E
- Country: Russia
- Region: Vladimir Oblast
- District: Gus-Khrustalny District
- Time zone: UTC+3:00

Savinskaya (Russian: Савинская) is a rural locality (a village) in Posyolok Urshelsky, Gus-Khrustalny District, Vladimir Oblast, Russia. The population was 19 as of 2010.

== Geography ==
Savinskaya is located on the Pol River, 29 km northwest of Gus-Khrustalny (the district's administrative centre) by road. Zabolotye is the nearest rural locality.
