= Savinskaya, Vozhegodsky Selsoviet, Vozhegodsky District, Vologda Oblast =

Savinskaya Савинская
- Village
- Location within Vologda Oblast Location within Russia
- Coordinates: 60°26′N 40°20′E
- Country: Russia
- Region: Vologda Oblast
- District: Vozhegodsky District
- Time zone: UTC+3:00

Savinskaya (Russian: Савинская) is a rural locality (a village) in Vozhegodskoye Urban Settlement, Vozhegodsky District, Vologda Oblast, Russia. The population was 153 as of 2002.

== Geography ==
The distance to Vozhega is 8 km. Pelevikha, Okulovskaya-1, Gridinskaya, Davydikha are the nearest rural localities.
