= Savinsky, Arkhangelsk Oblast =

Savinsky Савинский
- Work settlement
- Interactive map of Savinsky
- Location of Savinsky Savinsky (Arkhangelsk Oblast)
- Coordinates: 62°56′N 40°08′E
- Country: Russia
- Federal subject: Arkhangelsk Oblast
- Administrative district: Plesetsky District
- Founded: 1961

Population (2010 Census)
  - Total: 7,661
  - Estimate (2025): 5,440 (−29%)

Municipal status
  - Municipal district: Plesetsky Municipal District
  - Urban settlement: Savinskoye Urban Settlement
  - Capital of: Savinskoye Urban Settlement
- Time zone: UTC+3 (MSK)
- Postal code: 164288
- Dialing code: +7 818 32
- OKTMO ID: 11650180051

Savinsky (Russian: Савинский) is an urban locality (a work settlement) in Plesetsky District of Arkhangelsk Oblast, Russia, located 30 kilometers (19 mi) northwest of Plesetsk and 10 kilometers (6.2 mi) west of the Sheleksa railway station, on the right bank of the Yemtsa River. Municipally, it is the administrative center of Savinskoye Urban Settlement, one of the eight urban settlements in the district. Population: 7,661 (2010 census); 7,887 (2002 census); 11,544 (1989 Soviet census)..

== History ==
Savinskaya Volost already existed in the 19th century and was a part of Onezhsky Uyezd of Arkhangelsk Governorate. In 1929, Plesetsky District was established, which included Savinsky Selsoviet. In the years that followed, the territory of the selsoviet was modified several times; in particular, the urban-type settlement of Yemtsa was split in 1941. Savinsky was granted its current status on December 15, 1961.

== Economy ==
=== Industry ===
The biggest enterprise in the settlement is the cement plant, which was the first cement plant in Arkhangelsk Oblast and delivers cement to many works in north-western Russia. Other enterprises are in logging and timber processing.

=== Transportation ===
Savinsky is located on the highway connecting Kargopol with one of the principal highways in Russia, M8 between Moscow and Arkhangelsk (the highways meet in the village of Brin-Navolok northwest of Yemtsa). This is the historic trading route which connected Kargopol with Arkhangelsk before the railroad was built, and long stretches of this road are still unpaved. This road in particular connects Savinsky with the railway stations in Plesetsk and Yemtsa (although the closest railway station is in Sheleksa). There is regular bus service to both Plesetsk and Yemtsa.
