= 15th Scottish Reconnaissance Regiment =

15th Scottish Reconnaissance Regiment 15th Reconnaissance Battalion (Jan 1941 -Jan 1942))
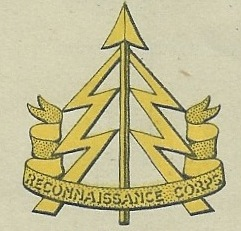
- Cap badge of the Reconnaissance Corps
- Active: 13 January 1941–1 April 1946
- Country: United Kingdom
- Branch: British Army
- Type: Reconnaissance
- Size: battalion
- Part of: 15th (Scottish) Infantry Division
- Engagements: Operation Epsom; Operation Jupiter; Operation Greenline; Operation Bluecoat; Operation Gallop; Operation Pheasant; Operation Nutcracker; Operation Veritable; Operation Plunder; Ricklingen Bridge; Nettelkamp; Operation Enterprise

Commanders
- Notable commanders: Lt Col James Grant Peterkin

The 15th Scottish Reconnaissance Regiment (Note: Although the regiment and its parent division were officially '15th (Scottish)', both routinely left off the brackets.) was a World War II unit of the British Army's Reconnaissance Corps, itself part of the Royal Armoured Corps. Formed from a variety of infantry units, it served with 15th (Scottish) Infantry Division in the North West Europe campaign in 1944–45.

== Origin ==
I5th (Scottish) Division was a Second Line Territorial Army (TA) formation, created as a duplicate of 52nd (Lowland) Division when the TA was rapidly doubled in size just before the outbreak of World War II. It was not ready for active service in time to join the British Expeditionary Force (BEF) in the Battle of France, but it took a frontline role in home defence after the BEF was evacuated from Dunkirk in May–June 1940.

=== 15th Reconnaissance Battalion ===
The BEF's operational experience showed that infantry divisions required a motorised component for battlefield reconnaissance. 15th (S) Division formed its reconnaissance group in 1940 with men drawn from the brigade anti-tank (A/T) companies and every infantry regiment in the division contributed some personnel. At first they were mounted on a variety of civilian motorcycles and heavy motor vans, but later these were exchanged for Universal Carriers ('Bren Carriers').

The Reconnaissance Corps ('Recce Corps') was formed on 8 January 1941 and took over the brigade reconnaissance groups to form battalions. 15th (S) Division's groups and 44, 45 and 46 Brigade A/T Companies combined to become 15th Battalion, Reconnaissance Corps at Kirkee Barracks, Colchester, on 13 January under Lieutenant-Colonel R.J. Sandeman as commanding officer (CO), with Major N.C. Hendricks as second-in-command (2iC).

At the time 15th (S) Division was stationed in Essex, moving to Suffolk in February 1941, still in a coast defence role but increasingly undertaking division-level training exercises. However, in November 1941 the division was moved to North East England and reduced to a lower establishment, acknowledging that it was unlikely to be deployed overseas for the foreseeable future. Under this establishment it only required a recce company, and 15th Bn Recce Corps (now commanded by Lt-Col Hendricks with Maj J.I. Faircloth as 2iC) was broken up at Consett, County Durham, on 1 January 1942. It formed three independent recce companies for three lower-establishment divisions:

- 15th Independent Recce Company – remained with 15th (S) Division
- 48th Independent Recce Company – assigned to 48th (South Midland) Division; 48th Recce Battalion (formerly 5th Battalion, Gloucestershire Regiment) had been transferred to 43rd (Wessex) Division
- 77th Independent Recce Company – assigned to 77th Division being formed from the Devon and Cornwall County Division.

15th Independent Recce Company, commanded by Maj P.T.I. MacDiarmid, became 15th Independent Recce Squadron on 6 June 1942 when the Recce Corps adopted cavalry nomenclature (regiments, squadrons and troops rather than battalions, companies and platoons; privates became troopers).

=== 21st Battalion, Royal Fusiliers ===
21st Battalion, Royal Fusiliers was one of a large number of new infantry battalions raised for home defence in the aftermath of Dunkirk. It was authorised on 4 July 1940 and formed on 5 September at Marbury Hall, Northwich, in Cheshire, under the command of Lt-Col E.L. Ricketts. On 11 October 1940 No 14 Infantry Training Group was reorganised as 214 Independent Infantry Brigade (Home), incorporating the 19th, 20th and 21st Battalions, Royal Fusiliers, and the 6th Battalion, Oxfordshire and Buckinghamshire Light Infantry. The battalion moved to Newbury, Berkshire, and then in November the brigade took over the defences of the Isle of Wight as part of the Hampshire County Division. 21st Battalion was stationed at The Needles Batteries, Ryde, and later Sandown.

On 15 July 1941 21st Royal Fusiliers was withdrawn to the mainland and sent to Faringdon, Berkshire, where on 17 July it was converted into 54th Battalion, Reconnaissance Corps in 54th (East Anglian) Infantry Division. Lieutenant-Col Ricketts retained command of the battalion, which absorbed 15 other officers and 421 other ranks (ORs) from 21st Royal Fusiliers, together with 162, 163 and 198 Infantry Brigade A/T Companies. The remainder of the personnel of 21st Royal Fusiliers were posted to the 14th, 15th, 19th and 20th Battalions, Royal Fusiliers.

54th (EA) Division was also reduced to the lower establishment and on 1 January 1942 54th Recce Battalion was broken up as follows:

- 54th Independent Recce Company – remained with 54th (EA) Division, stationed at Orford, Suffolk
- 45th Independent Recce Company – assigned to 45th Division, stationed at Danbury, Essex; 45th Recce Battalion had been transferred to 70th Division being formed in Egypt
- 76th Independent Recce Company – assigned to 76th Division being formed from the Norfolk County Division.

(48th, 76th and 77th Independent Recce Companies were later combined to form 80th (Holding and Training) Recce Regiment within 80th (Reserve) Division.)

== 15th Scottish Reconnaissance Regiment ==
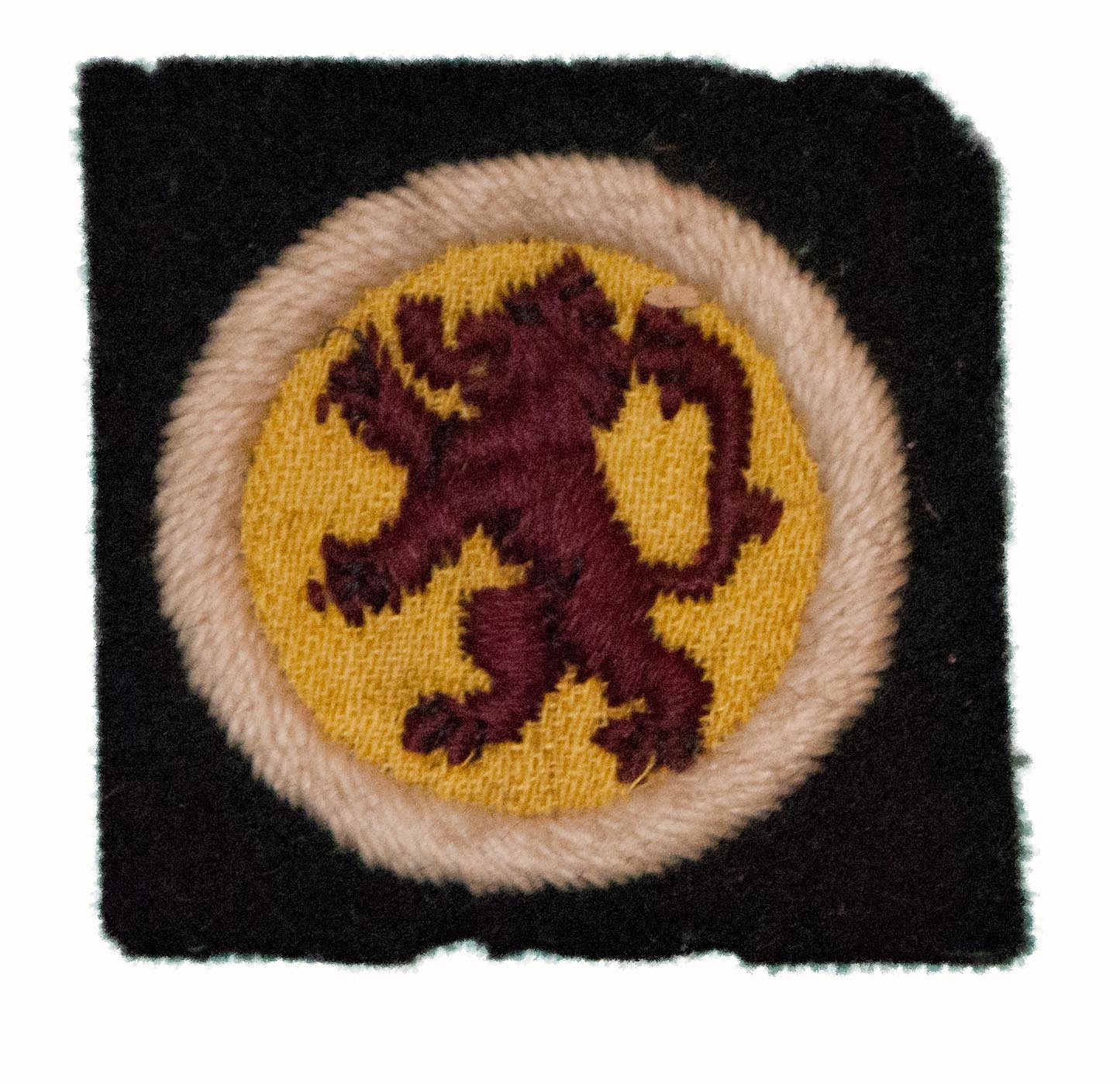
15th (Scottish) Division's formation sign.

On 7 December 1942 15th (S) Division was informed that it was to be raised to a higher establishment once more, as part of Second Army for the planned Allied invasion of Normandy (Operation Overlord). This time it was a 'Mixed' division of two infantry brigades and one tank brigade. A new 15th Scottish Reconnaissance Regiment was formed on 15 February 1943 at Felton Hall, Northumberland, with the following organisation:

- Regimental Headquarters (RHQ)
- HQ Squadron, including Signals and Mortar Trps and A/T Battery
- A Sqn – previously 15th Independent Sqn
- B Sqn – previously 45th Independent Sqn
- C Sqn – previously 54th Independent Sqn
- Light Aid Detachment, Royal Electrical and Mechanical Engineers

The regiment thus had a dual heritage, one-third from Scottish Lowland units, two-thirds Londoners from the Royal Fusiliers and men from East Anglian units. Two days after formation, 300 additional recruits arrived from Infantry Training Centres and Primary Training Wings. These men had little training, but later trained reinforcements were drawn from 162nd Regiment, Royal Armoured Corps, which had been converted from 9th Battalion, Royal West Kent Regiment, and was disbanded in July 1943. Lieutenant-Col James Grant Peterkin, previously commanding the Reconnaissance Training Centre at Scarborough, North Yorkshire, was posted to the regiment as its first CO.

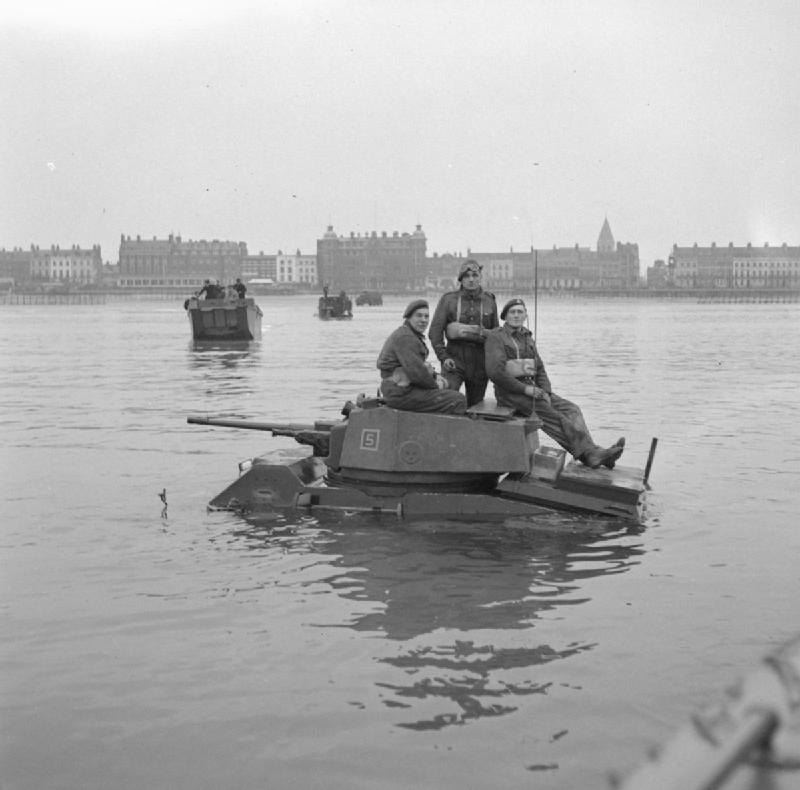
Humber Armoured Car 'drowned' in wading trials at Weymouth, 25 December 1943.

Regimental and squadron training exercises were held across Northumberland in the summer of 1943, and the squadrons developed relationships with their affiliated brigades:

- A Sqn – 46 Highland Bde
- B Sqn – 227 Highland Bde (replacing 6 Guards Tank Bde)
- C Sqn – 44 Lowland Bde

In September 1943 the regiment moved to a training area in West Yorkshire, where 15th (S) Division was to join VIII Corps. 15th Recce Rgt was based at Pontefract, with B and C Sqns on the Racecourse, A Sqn at nearby Castleford, and the A/T and Mortar Troops of HQ Sqn in the village of Darrington, though the units were rotated in January. Training for the invasion included waterproofing vehicles and driving them on and off landing craft. A detachment took part in wading trials off Weymouth, Dorset, where all the Humber Armoured Cars ended up 'drowned' in a few feet of water. The A/T Troop carried out firing practice on the range at Harlech. The regiment participated in a series of divisional exercises with particular emphasis on crossing rivers and minefields, culminating in VIII Corps' 12-day Exercise Eagle on the Yorkshire Wolds in February 1944.

The Reconnaissance Corps officially became part of the Royal Armoured Corps (RAC) from 1 January 1944. Major K.C.C. Smith (12th Lancers) was appointed 2iC of the regiment, with Maj MacDiarmid in command of HQ Sqn.

In mid-April 1944 15th (S) Division was ordered to move to its invasion concentration area in Sussex; 15th Recce Rgt went to Angmering. The men trained on foot while the vehicles were waterproofed. 15th (S) Division was not due to land in the first wave on D Day, which occurred on 6 June. It was not until 17 June that the regiment (less B Sqn, which would follow later) drove down to Denmead outside Portsmouth and was organised into five shiploads (two Landing Ship, Tank, and three Landing Craft, Tank) for transport to Normandy. However, sailings were delayed by a storm, and it was only on 26 June that the regiment drove into Gosport and loaded its vehicles onto the ships, which set sail that night.

=== Normandy ===
15th Scottish Recce Rgt's landing craft touched down on Nan Sector of Juno Beach on the evening of 27 June and began unloading, but after the signals office M3 half-track was drowned in an underwater crater the beachmaster halted landing until the following morning. The convoy then moved off to its concentration area at St Gabriel. When the regiment arrived the rest of 15th (S) Division had already been in action since 26 June in Operation Epsom (the 'Battle of Scottish Corridor'). On the evening of 29 June the regiment was ordered up to become divisional reserve next day. There was little scope for reconnaissance units in the close fighting in Normandy, so the regiment was used piecemeal for 'odd jobs'. Its first assignment was for C Sqn to act as infantry to fill a gap on the boundary between VIII Corps and XXX Corps. Coming under mortar fire, the squadron suffered the regiment's first battle casualties. RHQ at Putot-en-Bessin also came under shellfire. Next day A Sqn was sent forward to fill the wide gap between C Sqn and XXX Corps. At first the dismounted squadrons had no A/T guns, because they only landed that morning. Formally, the regimental A/T battery was part of HQ Sqn, but once the regiment was in Normandy Grant Peterkin divided it among the recce squadrons, each squadron being joined by a troop of two 6-pounders towed by Loyd Carriers with another Loyd ammunition carrier.

Operation Epsom ended on 2 July and 15th (S) Division was relieved from the front line. The recce regiment went into camp at Secqueville-en-Bessin until 9 July when A Sqn joined 46 (H) Bde west of Caen. Next day the squadron was ordered to reconnoitre towards Éterville and Maltot, with the intention of reaching the River Orne beyond, cooperating with an advance by 43rd (Wessex) Division (Operation Jupiter). Approaching Éterville the squadron was attacked by enemy fighter aircraft, shooting one down in flames. The battalion from 43rd (W) Division tasked with taking Éterville was unable to do so. 9th Cameronians from 46 (H) Bde had to take over the attack, while A Sqn found a way round the blocked village and shot up German infantry in the cornfields beyond but could go no further. 3 Troop, moving towards Maltot, was fired on by Germans tanks, losing two armoured cars. After the failed attack, A Sqn held a low ridge while 46 (H) Bde consolidated. That night the squadron was loaned to 214 Bde of 43rd (W) Division, which was trying to hold Hill 112; A Sqn dug in to cover its exposed flank. The squadron returned to Secqueville-en-Bessin on 11 July, having lost 20 casualties.

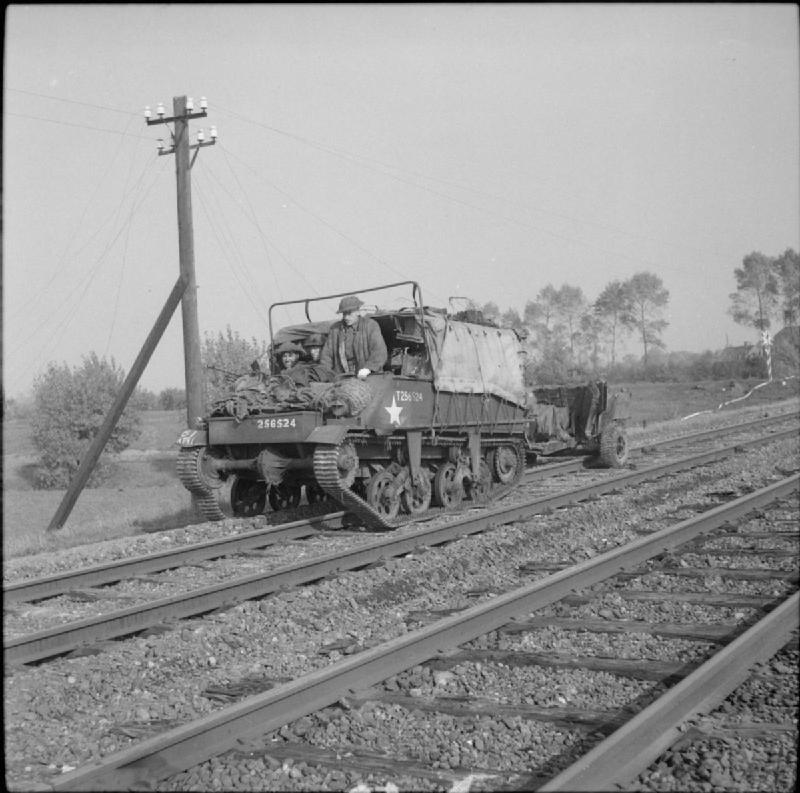
A Loyd Carrier towing a 6-pdr A/T gun in North West Europe 1944.

15th (S) Division's next action was Operation Greenline on 15/16 July, for which the final approach and initial assault were carried out at night under 'Movement Light' or 'Monty's Moonlight', employing searchlights reflected off the clouds. The recce regiment's main role in this operation was traffic control, using RHQ, part of HQ Sqn and part of A Sqn, with telephone lines laid by 11th Armoured Division's signallers. C Squadron was to have supported 227 (H) Bde, but was not called upon. A Squadron's carriers were used for casualty evacuation. The following night the regiment handed over traffic control to 53rd Recce Regiment. That night German aircraft bombed 15th Recce Rgt's 'harbour', now at Fontenay-le-Pesnel, killing two men and setting seven vehicles on fire, including two ammunition trucks. On 19 July B Sqn arrived from England. On 21 July the assault troops (each consisting of four infantry sections mounted in 15-hundredweight trucks) of the three recce squadrons were combined as 'Macforce' under Maj MacDiarmid and sent to reinforce 7th Seaforth Highlanders, who were holding Le Baltru but had suffered heavy casualties. The recce troopers manned forward posts and carried out patrols while the Seaforths rested.

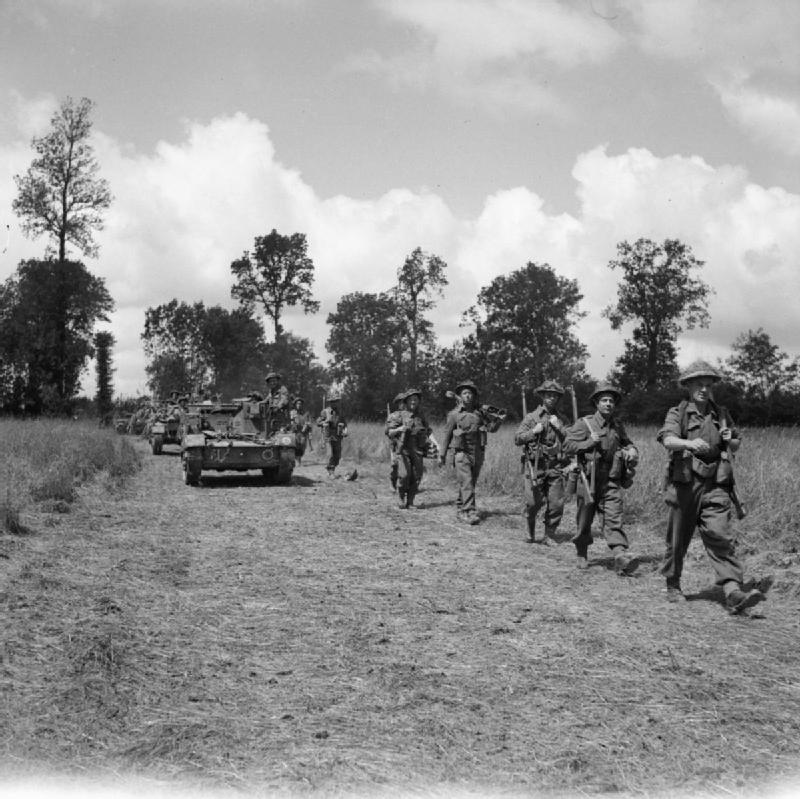
15th (Scottish) Division advancing during Operation Bluecoat, 30 July 1944.

On 23 July 15th (S) Division secretly moved to the extreme right of Second Army's front and relieved US troops at Caumont. It was then in position for VIII Corps' planned breakout attack (Operation Bluecoat). 15th Recce Rgt was at Balleroy, with C Sqn in the line a few miles ahead, linking 15th (S) Division with the neighbouring US division. 'Bluecoat' was launched at 06.55 on 30 July with a massive air attack. 227 (H) Brigade attacked on the left of 15th (S) Division, supported by Churchill tanks from 6 Guards Tank Bde and B and C Sqns of 15th Recce Rgt (one with each follow-up battalion). The brigade group enveloped Lutain Wood and moved on to la Récussonnière and Les Loges, the recce squadrons following the tanks and mopping up enemy pockets. The rest of the regiment came behind, awaiting an opportunity to seize the high ground round Le Bény-Bocage ahead (C Sqn had been told it was to lead Second Army's breakout). However, after the division had advanced 6 miles (9.7 km) it was halted by Germans holding out in Saint-Martin-des-Besaces. Patrols of 15th Recce Rgt and 11th Armoured Division reconnoitred St Martin during the night. Next morning A Sqn, together with armoured cars from the Inns of Court Regiment and 2nd Household Cavalry Regiment (the recce units of I Corps and VIII Corps) probed forward but were again held up at St Martin until 11th Armoured Division cleared it after 11.00. C Squadron went over Quarry Hill at dawn but was similarly held up at La Mancellière-sur-Vire; it had to make yellow smoke signals to indicate its identity when RAF Typhoon fighters attacked the village. There was still fighting round Quarry Hill on 1 August; in the evening B Sqn assisted 46 (H) Bde in clearing La Mancellière and 6 Trp suffered casualties in an engagement with enemy A/T guns. Guards Armoured Division now took up the lead, advancing on 2 August with 15th Recce Rgt protecting its flank, skirmishing with German patrols and next day the British armour began the breakout, swinging left. On 4 August the regiment's car patrols made contact with 43rd (W) Division at Le Mesnil-Auzouf. Two days later B Sqn accompanied 46 (H) Bde in an attack eastwards through Le Codmet, finding no opposition until they reached Gourney. 227 Brigade and C Sqn found Estry strongly held and suffered a number of casualties. For the next few days 15 (S) Division was stationary, the front protected by 15th and 43rd (W) Recce Rgts and the Inns of Court. However, the rest of VIII Corps pivoted on 15th (S) Division and continued advancing, so by 13 August the division was able to occupy Estry. The Germans were now in full retreat as the Falaise pocket closed round them, and 15th (S) Division was withdrawn for rest.

=== To the Seine ===
For 10 days 15th Recce Rgt rested, first at Amayé-sur-Orne, then at Fresney-le-Vieux. On 21 August A Sqn was sent to Teprel under command of 1st Royal Dragoons (XII Corps' recce regiment) to be ready for Operation Gallop, the pursuit to the River Seine. First the squadron was sent to investigate reports of enemy near Falaise, which turned out to be Lt-Gen Sir Miles Dempsey and Tactical HQ of his Second Army. 15th Recce Rgt was launched on Operation Gallop at dawn on 24 August, leaving Falaise and the three squadrons reconnoitring routes for the following brigades designated from north to south as 'Star' (C Sqn), 'Sun' (B Sqn) and 'Moon' (A Sqn). The squadrons were accompanied by Royal Engineers (REs) with bulldozers, bridging equipment and recovery vehicles to clear the roads, which were littered with bomb debris and destroyed and broken-down German tanks and vehicles. C Sqn found that Star route was impassable before Sainte-Foy-de-Montgommery, so had to divert onto Sun route. Some of the roads on Moon route collapsed, and the bulldozers had to be unloaded from their transporters simply to tow the transporters through. Major MacDiarmid decided to push on with just the armoured cars, leading the carriers to escort the equipment; an RE officer accompanied him to defuse mined bridges. By the end of the day A Sqn was out of radio contact with RHQ. That night the regiment occupied scattered harbours, with the armoured cars of 11 Trp furthest ahead at Bernay, some 40 miles (64 km) from Falaise. The advance was continued at dawn next day, B and C sqns reaching Beaumont-le-Roger by early afternoon. The bridges on the River Risle were mostly down, but a wooden bridge remained that could take the weight of the recce vehicles. A Sqn still out in front with a patrol of the Royal Dragoons also found a bridge over the Risle after attempting a ford that was mined. By the morning of 26 August the regiment was reconnoitring the banks of the Seine. A patrol crossed the river in a rowing boat, the first men of the division to cross. On the night of 27/28 August 227 (H) Bde began crossing in stormboats against considerable opposition, but all three brigades were across by the morning, and the RE ferried armoured car patrols of A and B Sqns across on rafts. The regiment's patrols then fanned out into the country beyond the river, skirmishing with enemy parties, covering the deployment of the infantry, and liaising with the Resistance units of the French Forces of the Interior and the neighbouring II Canadian Corps. On 1 September the regiment came under the command of 53rd (Welsh) Division to act as its flank guard, but next day it reached Marlers and was able to rest.

=== Belgium ===
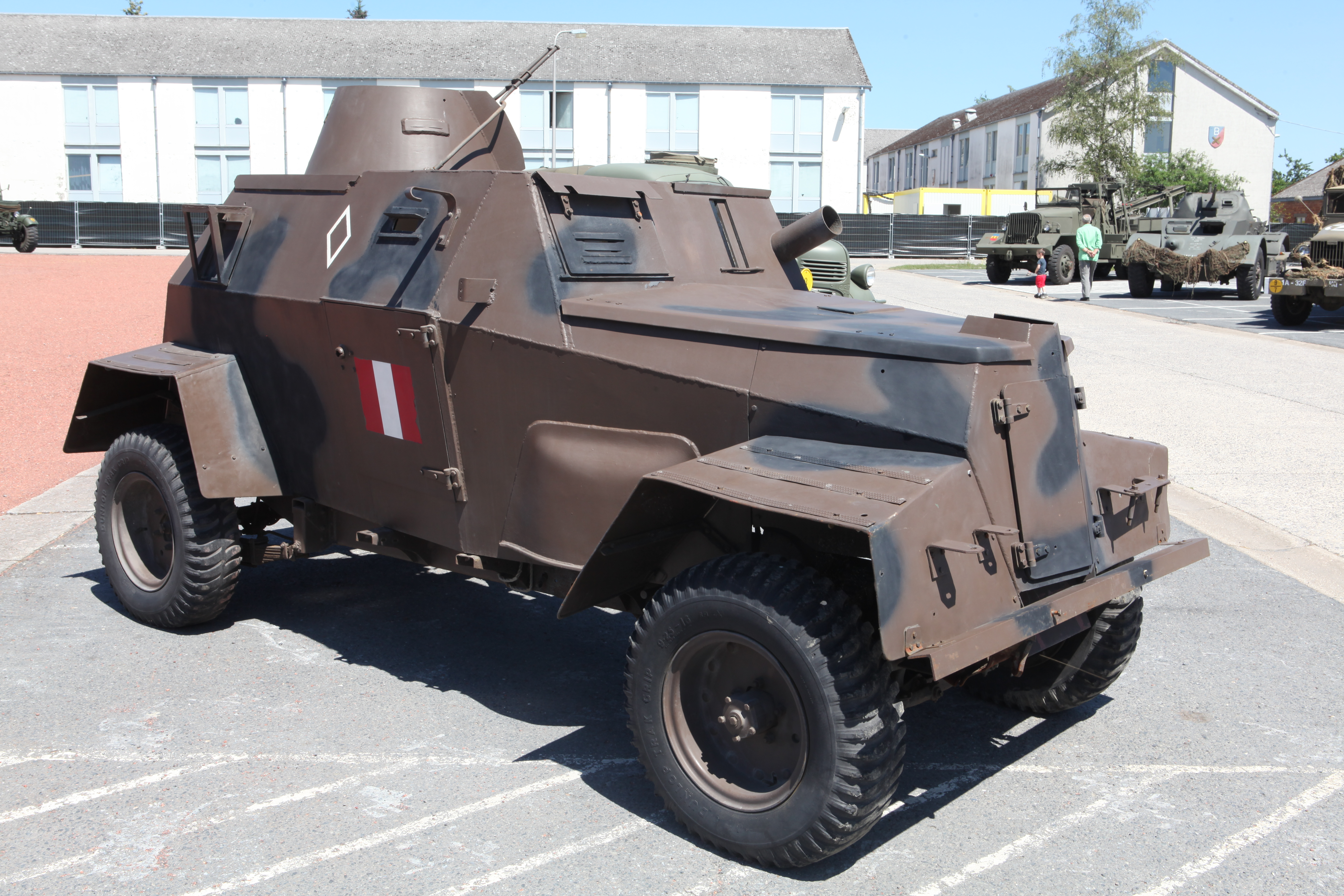
Humber Light Reconnaissance Car, widely used by the Recce Corps.

After three days at Marlers the regiment had been left far behind the pursuit, and on 5 September it drove more than 60 miles (97 km) to Houvin. There it joined a battle group ('Lys Force') of units of 15th (S) Division (most of which was still on its way from the Seine) and 1st Royal Dragoons. Next day this group drove a further 70 miles (110 km) into Belgium to clear a remaining pocket of German resistance threatening the flank of Second Army's advance. On the left B Sqn liberated Courtrai, in the centre C Sqn ran into opposition at the canal beyond Sweveghem and engaged in confused fighting around Vichte, losing an armoured car and two carriers, with several casualties. On the right A Sqn gathered up prisoners at Gruyshautem then pushed on to Kerkhove, where the leading car reported many Germans with A/T guns. Another fight broke out and the leading troops withdrew, leaving a damaged carrier and 6-pdr. Haphazard fighting continued next day as the regiment patrolled the pocket and the Germans tried to escape. At dusk A Sqn crossed the Escaut Canal at Kerkhove, supported on the near bank by tanks of 4th Royal Tank Regiment, which could not cross the wooden bridge. That night about 2000 Germans unsuccessfully attacked the bridgehead in a last attempt to escape the pocket. Next day progress was slowed by the numbers of Germans coming down the road to surrender. 15th (S) Division then made a 90 miles (140 km) journey to the Albert Canal to take over a bridgehead from 50th (Northumbrian) Division; 15th Recce Rgt harboured at Breendonk on 10 September; A Sqn patrolled from here while the rest of the regiment moved on to the bridgehead at Vorst on 12 September. Patrols found the Germans strongly holding the perimeter round the bridgehead, but next day they withdrew and the pursuit was resumed. A and B Squadrons hurried over the canal bridge and pushed on rapidly to the Junction (Meuse–Escaut) Canal, A Sqn to Gheel where it found the bridges down, B Sqn to Moll, where two cars were knocked out in a skirmish. The division's infantry seized a small bridgehead across the canal at Aart on the night of 13 September.

The Germans decided to make a stand on this canal line, and put the Aart bridgehead under severe pressure. On the night of 15 September a party from 15th Recce Rgt guided 2nd Gordon Highlanders to the lock gates 2 miles (3.2 km) west of the destroyed bridge at Donck, where they attempted to create a second bridgehead, but were pinned down by machine gun fire. On 17 September C Sqn took over guarding the canal bank in the Donck area, the assault troop setting up a daytime strongpoint in one of the factories. Next day two of the troopers were captured by an enemy patrol, and to prevent larger German incursions back over the canal the regiment had under command the 8th Royal Scots and two companies of the 1st Middlesex Regiment (divisional machine gun battalion). By now Second Army had launched Operation Market Garden and XII Corps was to advance up the west flank of the narrow advance. 15th (S) Division was therefore ordered to hand over its bridgehead and cross the canal through 53rd (W) Division's bridgehead at Lommel.

On 20 September Lt-Col Grant Peterkin was transferred to a staff position with 43rd (W) Division, but shortly afterwards he was sent to command 1st Gordon Highlanders in 51st (Highland) Division. According to his new 2iC, Grant Peterkin was said to be 'a superman to whom Army wanted to give a few months' experience of commanding a battalion [after a recce regiment] before he went on to command a brigade'. At the end of the war Grant Peterkin did command a brigade in 51st (H) Division. Major K.C.C. Smith was promoted to succeed him as CO of 15th Recce Rgt, with Maj MacDiarmid becoming 2iC.

=== Netherlands ===
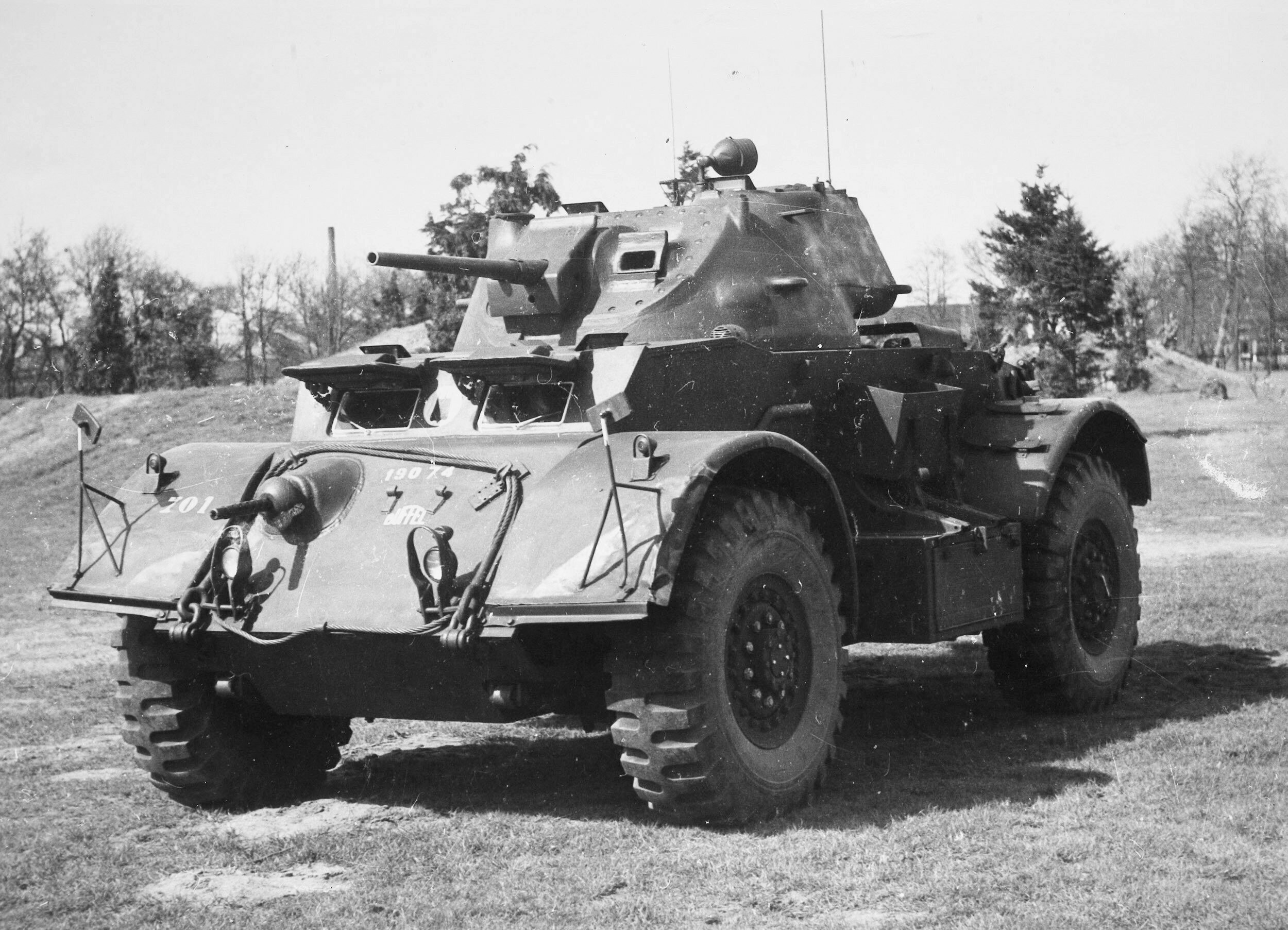
15th Scottish Recce Regiment used some Staghound armoured cars, but considered them too heavy.

On 21 September 15th Recce Rgt drove through Lommel, crossed the Escaut Canal and continued on to recently liberated Eindhoven. It found 53rd (W) Division facing the enemy over the Wilhelmina Canal and US paratroops holding the bridge at Zon. That night 15 (S) Division's infantry crossed the canal and secured the crossroads at the town of Best, but there was no break-out and 15th Recce Rgt was not called forward. Later its patrols up the Boxtel road failed to find any gaps in the German defences. RHQ remained south of the canal. While the infantry were involved in bitter house-to-house fighting the regiment could do little. On 27 September it moved up to Vleut and went into the woods dismounted as infantry, to hold a gap and to carry out foot patrols until 15th (S) Division was relieved on 2/3 October. 15th Recce Rgt then went into billets in Helmond.

While 15th (S) Division rested, the recce regiment was loaned to 11th Armoured Division and for a week the squadrons took turns to patrol and hold positions on the eastern side of the Nijmegen salient. On 15 October B Sqn's patrols confirmed that the Germans had abandoned the canal line, and 11th Armoured Division's REs built a bridge that the regiment guarded. 15th Recce Regiment was then ordered back to Helmond, where 15th (S) Division was to take part in XII Corps' operations to clear the western side of the Nijmegen salient (Operation Pheasant). On 19 October the regiment went back into the woods round Vleut as dismounted infantry in close proximity to the enemy and regularly under fire. However at dawn on 24 October B Sqn reported that they could hear no coughing from the nearby German positions. After patrols confirmed the enemy withdrawal, the regiment remounted its vehicles and advanced towards Boxtel and Tilburg, dealing with felled trees, mines and other roadblocks. Boxtel was unoccupied and was entered next day, while the regiment pressed on towards Tilburg. The leading troop found the bridge at Moergestel down, but 6 Guards Tank Bde, following behind, laid a Scissors bridge. While the rest of 15th (S) Division's advanced force continued towards Tilburg, B Sqn was sent round to reconnoitre the bridges at Oisterwijk and Moerenberg and possible routes beyond. Oisterwijk was strongly held by the Germans, but Moerenberg bridge was seized. The division liberated Tilburg on 27 October 1944 and 15th Recce Rgt was withdrawn for maintenance.

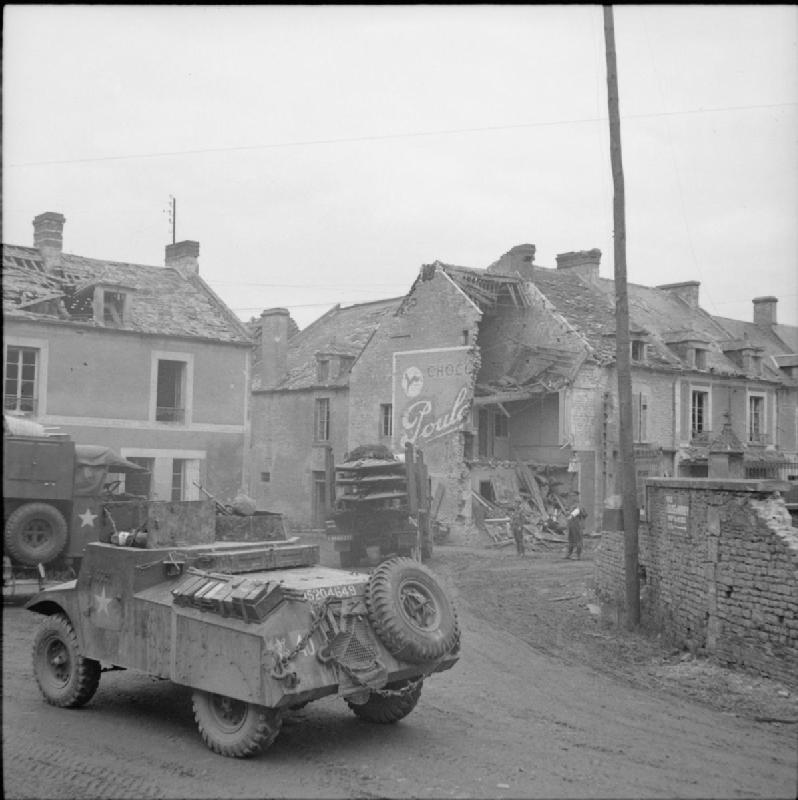
15th Scottish Recce Regiment also used some Morris Light Reconnaissance Cars or 'Morrisette's.

On 27 October at Meijel the Germans counter-attacked and drove back the 7th US Armored Division some 10 miles (16 km) from Helmond. 15th (S) Division was hurried back from Tilburg to meet the threat. By 29 October the division was in action astride the roads the Germans had been advancing along, and the task of pushing them back began next morning. A Squadron reconnoitred Liesel, finding it enemy-held and lost two cars, while the Bren carrier crews of 10 Trp, C Sqn, watching a wood near Liesel, came under heavy attack until the Glasgow Highlanders arrived. On 31 October the regiment was protecting the division's flank and maintaining liaison with the US troops; a troop of B Sqn captured an enemy-held school in 7th Armored's sector and held it as an artillery observation post. The regiment supported the advance down the Liesel–Meijel road by 15th (S) Division and 6 Guards Tank Bde, which was under heavy fire. Wheeled vehicles could not leave the road in this boggy area (the 'Peel'), but the tracked carriers proved useful. On 3 November the regiment required the help of flail tanks to clear a way through minefields, but still could not get much further down the road. B Squadron provided flank protection for the division's failed attack on Meijel on 5 November. It then spent two weeks with one squadron watching the flanks in the bogs as far as the canal at Deurne, one in reserve at the school, and one resting at Helmond. The Germans withdrew from Meijel on 11 November.

=== Maas ===
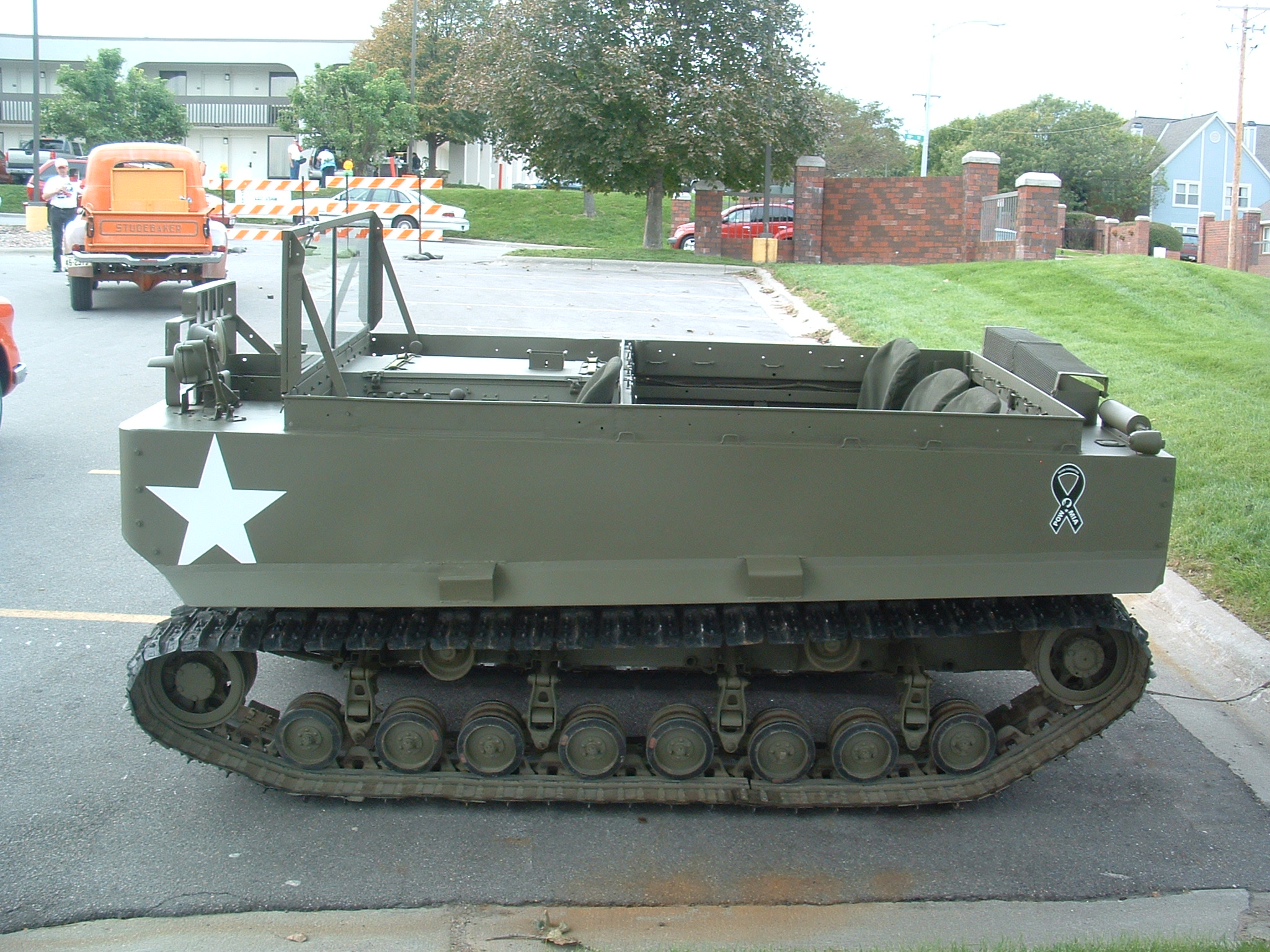
15th Scottish Recce Regiment used Weasels to cross mud.

Second Army now began operations to clear the Germans from their remaining bridgeheads on the west bank of the Maas (Operation Nutcracker). 15th (S) Division cleared the German rearguards from the Duerne Canal to the Maas. Lieutenant-Col Smith obtained some Weasel semi-amphibious vehicles for the regiment to cross the mud as it reconnoitred the division's two routes ('Skye' and 'Ayr'). They fought the rearguards and roadblocks back to the river on 26 November. 15th (S) Division was then given the task of capturing Blerick on the west bank opposite Venlo (Operation Guildford). This was carried out on 3 December as a fullscale assault, with all the resources of artillery and specialised armour. On the preceding two nights B Sqn and the Glasgow Highlanders carried out a diversion north of the town, including playing gramophone records of tank movements. During the attack C Sqn handled traffic control.

15th Scottish Recce Rgt then began a period of watching the Maas. It was an assigned a long stretch of riverbank north of Blerick, which was held by each squadron in turn for a week at a time. The rest of the regiment was quartered at Lierop. German patrols regularly crossed the 150 yards (140 m) river and penetrated the thinly-held lines at night and once took nine prisoners from an A Sqn position. From 22 December this section was held by a stronger infantry unit and the regiment's Maas squadron moved upriver to Hout-Blerick and was reinforced by elements of HQ Sqn. From 8 January 1945 the regiment also provided a squadron for the division's mobile reserve at Roggel.

=== Reichswald ===
Between 22 and 28 January 15th (S) Division was relieved from its positions along the Maas and concentrated around Tilburg, where it joined XXX Corps for Operation Veritable to clear the Reichswald. On 7 February 15th Recce Rgt moved up to wait at Nijmegen while C Sqn went forward to handle traffic control when the attack went in next morning (it was allotted six Churchill tanks as armoured control posts). The attack broke through the Siegfried Line, and on 9 February the regiment was sent up to reconnoitre routes forward from Kleve. However, huge traffic jams through Kleve (beyond C Sqn's control posts in the Siegfried Line) slowed the advance. B Sqn was ordered to try to get round the southern outskirts of Kleve in the dark to seize the railway embankment between the town and the forest. The move was assisted by searchlights but ran into opposition, and only got through by morning with the help of tanks. Kleve was still not sufficiently clear to allow A Sqn through to reconnoitre the roads, and by 13 February the regiment had got no further than Hasselt when the Germans blew up a dyke and flooded the countryside. The thrust of the advance was switched to higher ground, involving tanks and infantry, and there was little for the regiment to do. By 21 February XXX Corps had reached Goch and 15th (S) Division was engaged to its south. B Sqn was sent into the woods round Schloss Calbeck and was engaged in sharp fights and under shellfire for two days. On 23 February the patrols were relieved.

=== Rhine ===
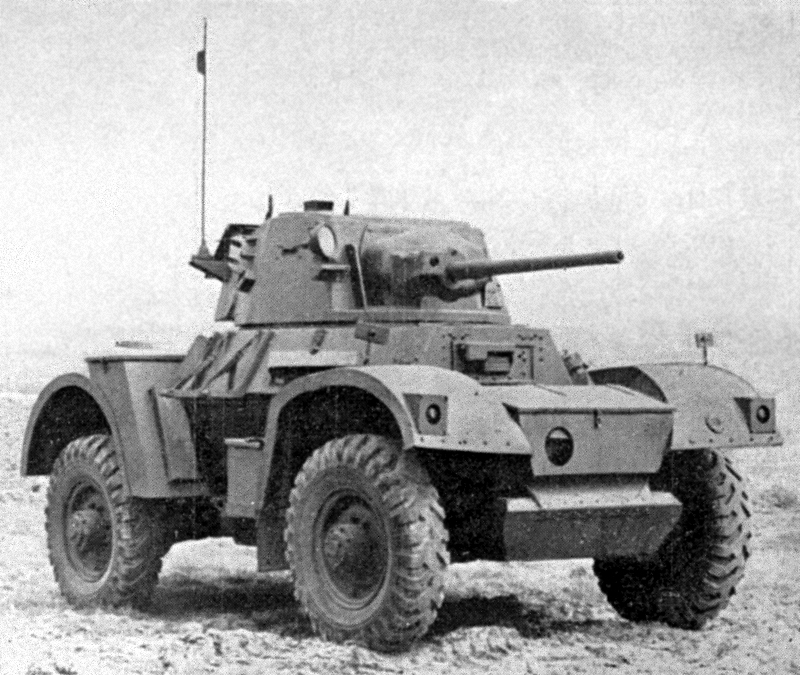
15th Scottish Recce Regiment used Daimler Armoured Cars in 1945.

15th Recce Rgt rested at Tilburg, then on 5 March moved to Bourg Leopold in Belgium where 15th (S) Division went into training for the assault crossing of the Rhine (Operation Plunder). Here the regiment exchanged its Humber armoured cars for Daimlers, and made arrangements for training with the 11th Hussars, Inns of Court Regiment and Derbyshire Yeomanry who already operated the Daimler. The last of the old Loyd carriers were also withdrawn and the A/T troops issued with Universal Carriers. On 21 March the regiment moved through Venlo and was quartered in farms beyond. Although the regiment was to play no part in the assault crossing, each squadron provided six half tracks to move storm boats and bridging materials up to the river, and carriers transported Military Government detachments and wireless links.15th (S) Division carried out its part of the crossing (Operation Torchlight) during the night of 23/24 March and by the afternoon had made contact with 6th Airborne Division, which had landed that morning. The carriers of 4 Troop of C Sqn were ferried across aboard Buffalos to patrol ahead of 44 (L) Bde as far as the autobahn. Next day the troop was joined by 1 Trp; they called down artillery fire to deal with German self-propelled guns that were shelling them, and set up an observation post in a windmill at Hamminkeln. The rest of the regiment crossed by pontoon bridge on 26 March, B Sqn protecting the left flank of 227 (H) Bde and A Sqn filling the gap between 46 (H) Bde and 44 (L) Bde. On 29 March the whole regiment was to protect the left flank while 227 (H) Bde attacked Haldern, but as B Sqn's patrols went forward they saw British troops from 3rd Division entering the objective and the attack was hurriedly called off. The Germans had withdrawn from the divisional front during the night. 15th (S) Division did not immediately join the pursuit, being rested by the Rhine.

=== To the Elbe ===
In early April, 15th (S) Division moved up to the Dortmund–Ems Canal, but 15th Recce Rgt was sent to Winterswijk in the Netherlands. It was then ordered to come under 6th Airborne Division, which was moving rapidly across Germany, and finally caught up with it near Oldendorf, where the division had a bridgehead over the Ems–Weser Canal. A Squadron was sent forward to work with the leading brigade of airborne troops riding on tanks of the 6 Guards Tank Bde, who deployed and attacked whenever the leading recce patrol contacted the enemy. The rest of the regiment worked along the flanks, with the assault troops clearing any minor opposition. 6th Airborne Division stormed the River Weser at Petershagen on 6 April, and next day 15th Recce Rgt crossed the river and led a rapid pursuit of the enemy, with C Sqn protecting the flank and maintaining contact with XII US Corps. The recce vehicles were fired at by anti-aircraft guns as they skirted Wunstorf airfield and then reached the bridge over the Leine at Bordenau, where the airborne troops quickly established another bridgehead. However, Neustadt bridge was blown up. A Squadron began the day in reserve, but was sent up to reconnoitre the east bank of the Weser for 11th Armoured Division, which advanced through the 6th Airborne bridgehead at Petershagen. Next day (8 April) B Sqn sent a force up the east bank of the Leine towards Ricklingen bridge, where there were Germans on both sides of the river. With two carrier troops, the assault troop, mortars and a 6-pdr, the force moved through close country and was able to surprise the defenders. The bridge was intact, and the troopers cut the demolition cables and made their prisoners dump the explosive charges into the river. The troopers then dug in to defend both ends of the bridge and await the airborne troops, the German civilians sheltering in their cellars. A German counter-attack came in the afternoon, led by a Tiger tank and two self-propelled guns. The tank destroyed the squadron's vehicles one by one, and drove over the 6-pdr before it could be brought to bear; the anti-tank PIAT was ineffective. Skirmishing with German infantry in half-tracks, the troopers withdrew from the village on foot, followed by the Germans, and eventually got back to Bordenau to report. The party on the other side of the bridge, however, remained in position until relieved by airborne troops coming up the west bank, who secured the bridge and stormed the village. US troops were soon pouring across the bridge to continue their advance.

15th Recce Rgt patrolled forwards while the 6th Airborne Division expanded its bridgehead over the Leine, then on 11 April 15th (S) Division came through to continue the advance towards Celle. The recce squadrons patrolled ahead, skirmishing with rearguards and rounding up prisoners. At nightfall 9th Cameronians and some tanks caught up and tried to fight their way into Celle, but were held up by a group of German officer cadets resisting fiercely. Next day 227 (H) Bde entered Celle and crossed the River Aller. Once the river was bridged, 15th Recce Rgt spread over a wide area ahead of the advance to Uelzen on 13 April, finding routes around numerous demolitions. 227 (H) Brigade only just failed to capture Uelzen by surprise that night. After pushing forward south of the town next day, C Sqn concentrated for the night at Nettelkamp. At midnight the position was attacked by Panzer Division Clausewitz, largely composed of veteran troops from reserve units and instructors from training schools, with heavy armour. The troop positions were overrun, though squadron HQ fought on in the village before withdrawing. (Note: After overrunning C Sqn the Clausewitz Division attacked the Glasgow Highlanders and divisional artillery at Stadensen in a battle that continued until dawn.) When a patrol from B Sqn reached the survivors, it found that C Sqn had lost seven killed or fatally wounded, 14 wounded, and 39 missing, together with eight carriers, four armoured cars and a half-track. The regiment reorganised as two squadrons (A & C), and stayed mobile by using numerous captured vehicles. Fighting continued at Uelzen until 18 April. When 15th Recce Rgt moved out towards the River Elbe, it was in conjunction with 2nd Special Air Service Regiment, which had been operating ahead of Second Army in Operation Archway. The group was also accompanied by a 4.2-inch mortar platoon of 1st Middlesex. The group reached the Elbe on 19 April, fighting retreating Germans and liberating British and US prisoners of war (POWs).

After rest and preparation at the Elbe, 15th (S) Division carried out an assault crossing (Operation Enterprise) early on 29 April. 15th Recce Rgt had relieved the division's post along the river the day before as the brigades concentrated for the attack, then waited its turn to be ferried over. First to cross in Buffalos was the regiment's A/T battery supporting 1st Commando Brigade. C Squadron followed in the afternoon, having suffered casualties from air attack while waiting to cross. The squadron's patrols and the SAS jeeps were six miles beyond the river by nightfall. Next day A Sqn probed as far as Hamwarde, finding it strongly held, but C Sqn occupied Schwarzenbek on the main Hamburg–Berlin road. While Second Army pushed on to Hamburg, 15th (S) Division cleared the Sachsenwald forest area. On 2 May a patrol of A Sqn was approached by German officers under a white flag, who were passed up to 227 (H) Bde HQ and began the negotiations that resulted in the German surrender at Lüneburg Heath on 4 May. Before the ceasefire, C Sqn captured Ahrensburg, which became divisional HQ, and the acting CO (Maj MacDiarmid) and the SAS Co were able to drive unhindered to Lübeck. However, the regiment was still in action as late as 10 May, the reformed B Sqn forming stop lines as the German Army rounded up armed Waffen-SS parties in the Forest of Segeberg.

=== Postwar ===
On 7 May 1945, the regiment began occupation duties: A Sqn went with 46 (H) Bde to occupy Kiel, C Sqn established posts on the bridges over the Kiel Canal at Brunsbüttel 65 miles (105 km) away, and both squadrons were 60 miles (97 km) from RHQ at Elmenhorst. Thereafter the regiment remained stationed between Hamburg and Lübeck for the rest of its service, providing guards and escorts for POWs and displaced persons. In June 1945 it patrolled the line being established between the Western Allied and Soviet occupation zones. Meanwhile, demobilisation got under way. Lieutenant-Col K.C.C. Smith was posted as a staff officer to India and was succeeded as CO on 29 September by Lt-Col Roderick Heatcoat-Amory from 1st Royal Dragoons. 15th Scottish Reconnaissance Regiment was finally disbanded in Germany on 1 April 1946. The remaining personnel were drafted to other units in British Army of the Rhine, mainly the 13th/18th Hussars and 14th/20th Hussars. The regimental roll of honour includes the names of 7 officers and 66 other ranks who were killed in action, died of wounds or accidents on active service.

== Uniform & insignia ==
From its formation in February 1943, 15th Scottish Recce Rgt wore the Scottish Balmoral bonnet as the headgear for all ranks, in khaki with a green square backing for the Recce Corps badge. However, on 23 May 1944 the regiment adopted the Royal Armoured Corps' black beret with the Recce Corps badge. Officers purchased collar badges at their own expense: these comprised the Recce Corps badge in silver, with a superimposed silver disc bearing the Scottish red lion of the divisional badge.

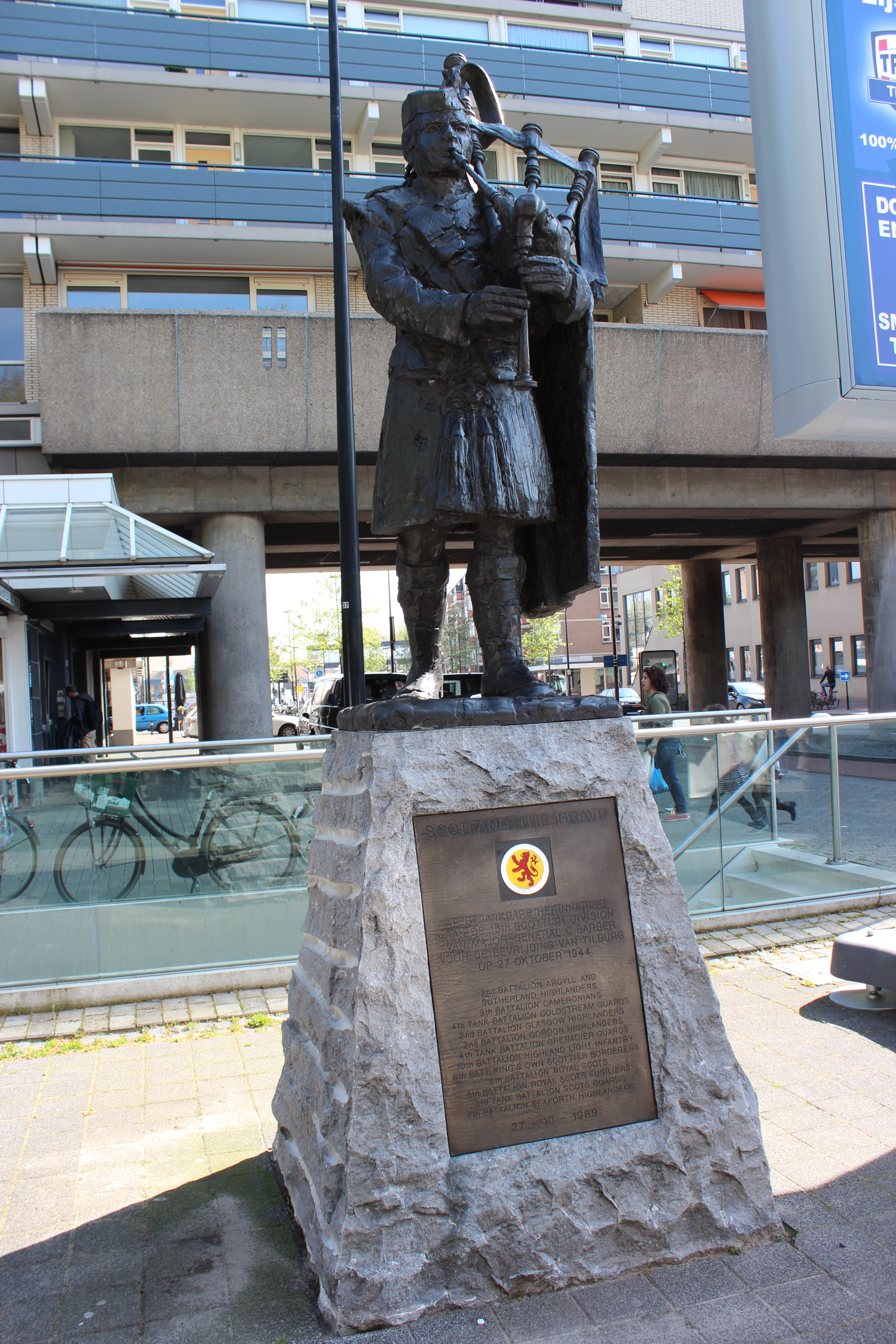
Monument to 15th (Scottish) Division and the liberation of Tilburg.

== Memorials ==
The 15th (Scottish) Divisional memorial to those who died in North West Europe between 26 June 1944 and 5 May 1945 was unveiled on 26 June 1949 at Tourville-sur-Odon. Another divisional memorial, depicting a bagpiper sculpted by Frans Broers, was unveiled on 27 October 1989 at Tilburg, which had been liberated by the division on 27 October 1944.

The 15th Scottish Recce Regiment Old Comrade's Association planted a Scots Pine tree at the National Memorial Arboretum, Alrewas, Staffordshire, in September 2000. A wooden regimental plaque bearing the red lion superimposed on the Recce Corps badge was installed in the chapel at the National Arboretum. Similar plaques are at the Pegasus Bridge and Arromanches museums in Normandy, and were presented to the mayors of Tilburg and Helmond; the regimental flag has been at Arromanches since 1991.

== External sources ==
- Hans Houterman, World War II Unit Histories (archive site)
- T.F. Mills, Land Forces of Britain, the Empire and Commonwealth – Regiments.org (archive site)
- Reconnaissance Corps Website (archive site)
