= Terlingen =

Terlingen is a surname. Notable people with the surname include:

- Henk Terlingen (1941–1994), Dutch radio and television presenter
  - 12135 Terlingen, an asteroid named after Henk Terlingen
- Theo Terlingen (1939–2006), Dutch field hockey player
