= Titulaer =

Titulaer is a surname. Notable people with the surname include:

- Boris Titulaer (born 1980), Dutch singer-songwriter
- Chriet Titulaer (1943–2017), Dutch astronomer, media personality, and writer
  - 12133 Titulaer, a main-belt asteroid named after Chriet Titulaer
