= 107th Light Anti-Aircraft Regiment, Royal Artillery =

WW2 British Army unit

14th Battalion, Royal Fusiliers 107th Light Anti-Aircraft Regiment, RA
- Cap badge of the Royal Artillery
- Active: 1 May 1940–25 July 1944
- Country: United Kingdom
- Branch: British Army
- Role: Infantry; Air defence
- Size: Battalion; Regiment
- Engagements: Battle of France; Defence of Malta

The 107th Light Anti-Aircraft Regiment, Royal Artillery, (107th LAA Rgt) was an air defence unit of the British Army during World War II. Initially raised as a garrison battalion of the Royal Fusiliers (City of London Regiment) in 1940, which briefly served in the Battle of France, it transferred to the Royal Artillery at the beginning of 1942. It served in Malta and Italy until it was broken to provide infantry reinforcements in 1944.

== 14th (Overseas Defence) Battalion, Royal Fusiliers ==
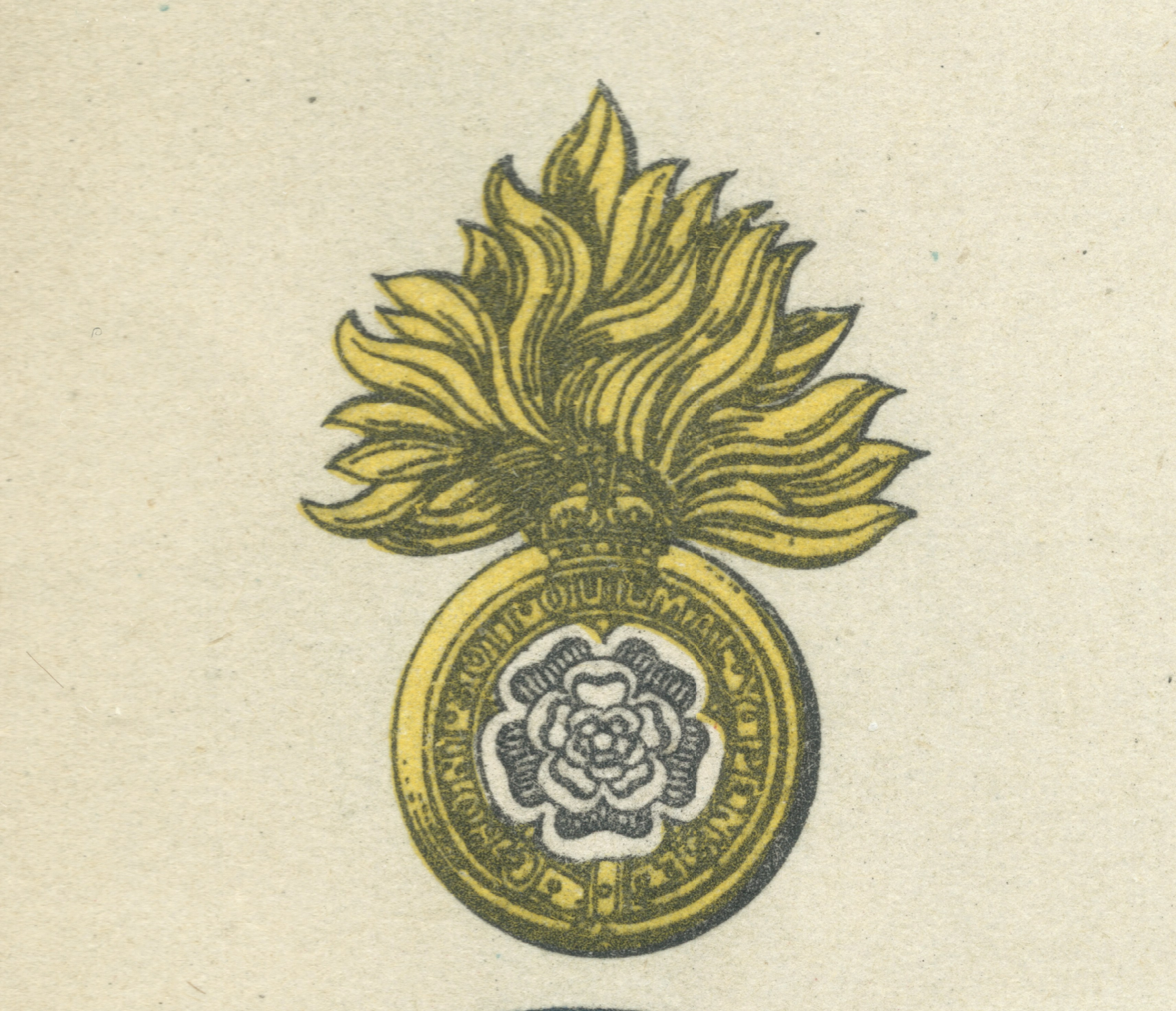
Cap badge of the Royal Fusiliers, 1941

14th (Overseas Defence) Battalion, Royal Fusiliers, was originally formed (by an order dated 7 November 1939) at Citadel Barracks, Dover, as part of the rapid expansion of the British Army on the outbreak of World War II. The personnel were men aged 35 to 50, who had seen service during World War I, drawn from No 15 Holding Battalion, Royal Fusiliers. The battalion was commanded by Lieutenant-Colonel J.L. Heselton. It moved to Halstead in Essex on 5 February 1940, and recruits were still coming in and being uniformed on 21 February, the day before it embarked for France.

=== Battle of France ===
The new battalion was sent to serve as Line of Communication (LoC) troops for the British Expeditionary Force (BEF) that was being assembled in France. Because of these rear area duties, and the previous military experience of the men, the battalion was deployed early, before many of the established fighting units were ready; its training had been sketchy. It embarked on SS Fenella at Southampton Docks on 22 February and landed at Le Havre the following day.

The role of the garrison battalions was to protect the LoCs and airfields under construction. Once in France, the companies and platoons of 14th (OD) Battalion were dispersed to guard docks, stores and supply dumps at Le Havre, with detachments at Canaples, Flexicourt, Sigy, Buchy, Saleux and Bolbec. W Company was guarding airfields near Poix, with part of a platoon detached to Calais. When the Germans launched the Battle of France on 10 May they swiftly cut through the Ardennes and swung towards the English Channel, threatening to cut the BEF off from its bases south of the Somme. The Royal Air Force left its airfields at Poix and Crécy, leaving W Company to rejoin the battalion as best they could. Using commandeered transport and joining other retreating convoys, the company reached Le Havre on 20 May. The rest of the battalion had suffered a number of casualties form the bombing of Le Havre. The CO had been appointed commander of an ad hoc brigade of Territorial Army troops under Brigadier Archibald Beauman commanding Beauman Division, who was responsible for security for the LoCs south of the River Somme and was defending river lines to cover the bases as they were evacuated.

Leaving W Company as its rearguard, most of 14th (OD) Battalion embarked on the Southern Railway steamer SS St Briac, but instead of going back to the UK, it was diverted to Cherbourg, where the British Army was attempting to assembled a Second British Expeditionary Force even after the original BEF had been evacuated from Dunkirk. Y Company had been taken off at Dunkirk on 28 May, except one platoon that got away from Boulogne. 14th (OD) Battalion, less these two companies and its motor transport (MT), landed at Cherbourg on 13 June and went by train to Rennes. Here they were joined by their MT and kit, which the quartermaster had led across country from Le Havre.

The Germans now turned south and forced the bulk of Beauman Division back beyond the Seine; 51st (Highland) Division and a brigade of Beauman Division were destroyed at Saint-Valery-en-Caux. Plans for a Second BEF had been abandoned and what remained of Beauman Division and all the other LoC troops were now ordered to fall back to Cherbourg and other western ports, where they were to be evacuated as part of Operation Ariel. On 15 June 14th (OD) Battalion was ordered to proceed to Saint-Malo by rail and destroy its transport. There it re-embarked on the St Briac on 16 June and landed at Southampton next day. W Company and Lt-Col Heseldon, who had reached Le Havre on 31 May to command the garrison troops, had been evacuated to Southampton on 16 June. Platoon Sergeant-Major Percy Bedford, who had collected 135 men of various regiments, led them to Brest, from where they were evacuated to Plymouth. Once in Britain, the various elements of 14th (OD) Battalion were concentrated at Sheffield, having suffered 47 casualties in the campaign.

=== Island defence ===
From Sheffield, 14th (OD) Battalion was sent to Peterborough. Iceland had been occupied by British Forces in May 1940, and on 16 October two companies of 14th (OD) Battalion were detached to form part of the garrison. They were still serving there in early 1941. One of these later became 1st Independent Garrison Company, and two new companies were raised for 14th Royal Fusiliers at Peterborough.

Meanwhile, the troops evacuated from France were engaged in constructing and manning defences in the event of invasion of the UK. Between January and May 1941 14th Royal Fusiliers under Lt-Col Heselton was engaged in building 27 pillboxes and defended gun positions around the coastline of St Mary's, Isles of Scilly, under the guidance of the Royal Engineers. The battalion then returned to the mainland and went into the defences of the Devon coast at Westward Ho!, Woolacombe Bay and Saunton Sands. In June it moved to Gravesend and the fixed defences guarding the Thames and Medway, afterwards to Westerham, Knockholt and Shoreham, Kent. The battalion was then increasingly employed in airfield defence, including Biggin Hill, Redhill and RAF West Malling.

== 107th Light Anti-Aircraft Regiment ==
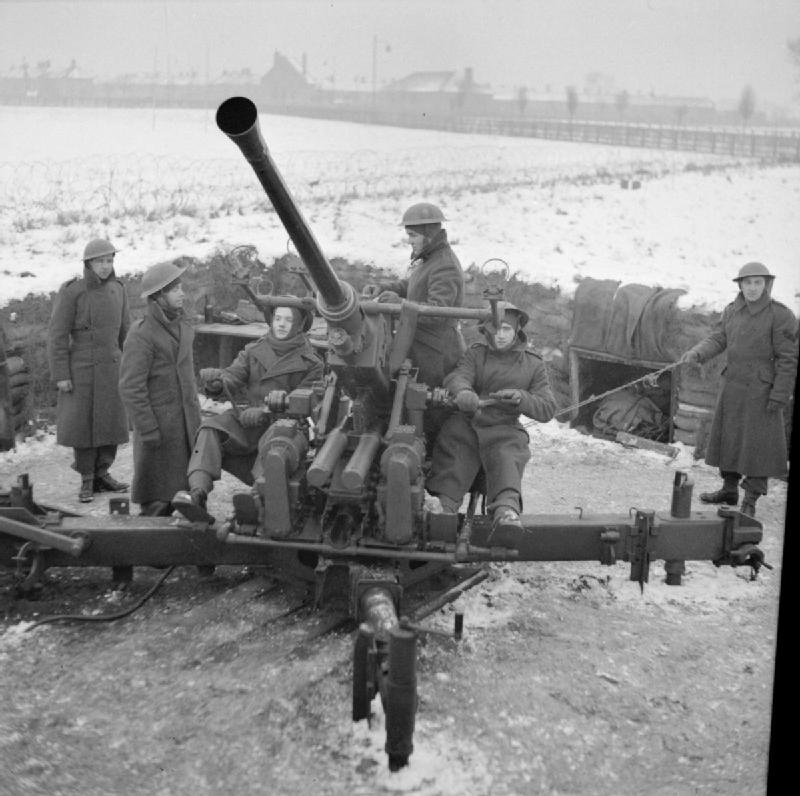
A Bofors 40 mm LAA gun crew under training, January 1942.

On 1 January 1942 14th Royal Fusiliers transferred to the Royal Artillery (RA) to begin retraining in the light anti-aircraft (LAA) role as 107th Light Anti-Aircraft Regiment, with Regimental Headquarters (RHQ) and 351, 352 and 353 LAA Batteries, each equipped with 18 Bofors 40 mm guns. During initial training at Newquay and Yeovil, 107th LAA Rgt joined Anti-Aircraft Command, but left before it had been assigned to a brigade.

The regiment served in VIII Corps District in South-West England until September, when it came under War Office control preparatory to being deployed overseas. By November 1942 it had the following organisation:

- RHQ
- 351, 352, 353 LAA Btys
- 351, 352, 353 LAA Workshop Sub-Sections, Royal Electrical and Mechanical Engineers

=== Malta ===
On 14 December 1942 the regiment embarked in HM Transport Highland Princess and sailed via Freetown in West Africa to Durban in South Africa, where it spent 18 January–28 February 1943 in a transit camp. It then embarked for Bombay in India arriving on 17 March and re-embarking on 19 March for Basra in Iraq. Having arrived on 1 April it set off once again on 10 April for Suez in Egypt, where it landed on 26 April. At Quassassin Camp it collected vehicles and guns, carried out training, including live firing. 352 LAA Battery left the regiment on 15 May.

The regiment was earmarked for the Allied invasion of Sicily (Operation Husky). On 1 June it began the long overland march from Egypt to Tripoli in Libya, arriving on 14 June. There it embarked on 17 June and disembarked in Malta two days later. 351 LAA Battery was deployed to Ta' Qali airfield and 353 LAA Bty to St. Paul's Bay to provide AA cover for the mass of 'Husky' shipping. At this point the plan was changed and 107th LAA Rgt was replaced in the 'Husky' order of battle by the experienced 74th LAA Rgt, which had served through the Siege of Malta. (Note: On 6 August 1943, while in Sicily, 352 LAA Bty (ex-107th LAA Rgt) was regimented with 74th LAA Rgt.) On 4 July 107th LAA Rgt came under the command of 7th LAA Brigade in the Malta AA defences.

There was little Axis air activity over Malta during the 'Husky' build-up: the assault convoys sailed on 9 July and it was not until 20 July that 20-plus enemy bombers crossed the coast and attacked Grand Harbour and other ports and anchorages. The volume and accuracy of the AA fire they received meant that few bombs reached their intended targets. There were no military casualties or damage to military equipment, but a number of civilian casualties. A second raid on St Paul's Bay in the early hours of 26 July had similar results. After a few lone intruders there were no more air raids, though Malta remained a major base. 107th LAA Rgt now settled into its positions, with 351 LAA Bty at Grand Harbour and 353 LAA Bty at Ta' Qali. The Allies invaded the Italian mainland on 9 September, initiating the long Italian Campaign.

=== Disbandment ===
By the summer of 1944 British forces in Italy were suffering an acute manpower shortage. In June the Chiefs of Staff decided that the number of AA regiments in Italy must be reduced and their fit personnel converted to other roles, particularly infantry.

The defences of Malta were being run down and 107th LAA Regiment went to Italy, where it became one of those selected for disbandment. (Note: Some sources allege that the regiment was disbanded in Malta, but this is contradicted by the surviving regimental war diary.) On 7 July 1944 the regiment was at Afragola Camp near Naples under command of Maj L.M. Rudge, when it was ordered to disband. Of those on the regiment's strength, 17 officers and 268 other ranks (ORs) were sent for infantry training, 12 officers and 193 ORs for posting to other RA units, smaller parties of ORs to the Royal Armoured Corps, Reconnaissance Corps, Royal Engineers and Royal Corps of Signals for retraining. The process was completed on 25 July, when Maj Rudge went to run a Prisoner-of-war camp.

== Insignia ==
107th LAA Regiment adopted a regimental arm badge consisting of a red square with a gold Royal Artillery 'bomb' badge with motto 'UBIQUE' superimposed on a crashing aircraft.
