= Henk Terlingen =

Dutch radio and television presenter

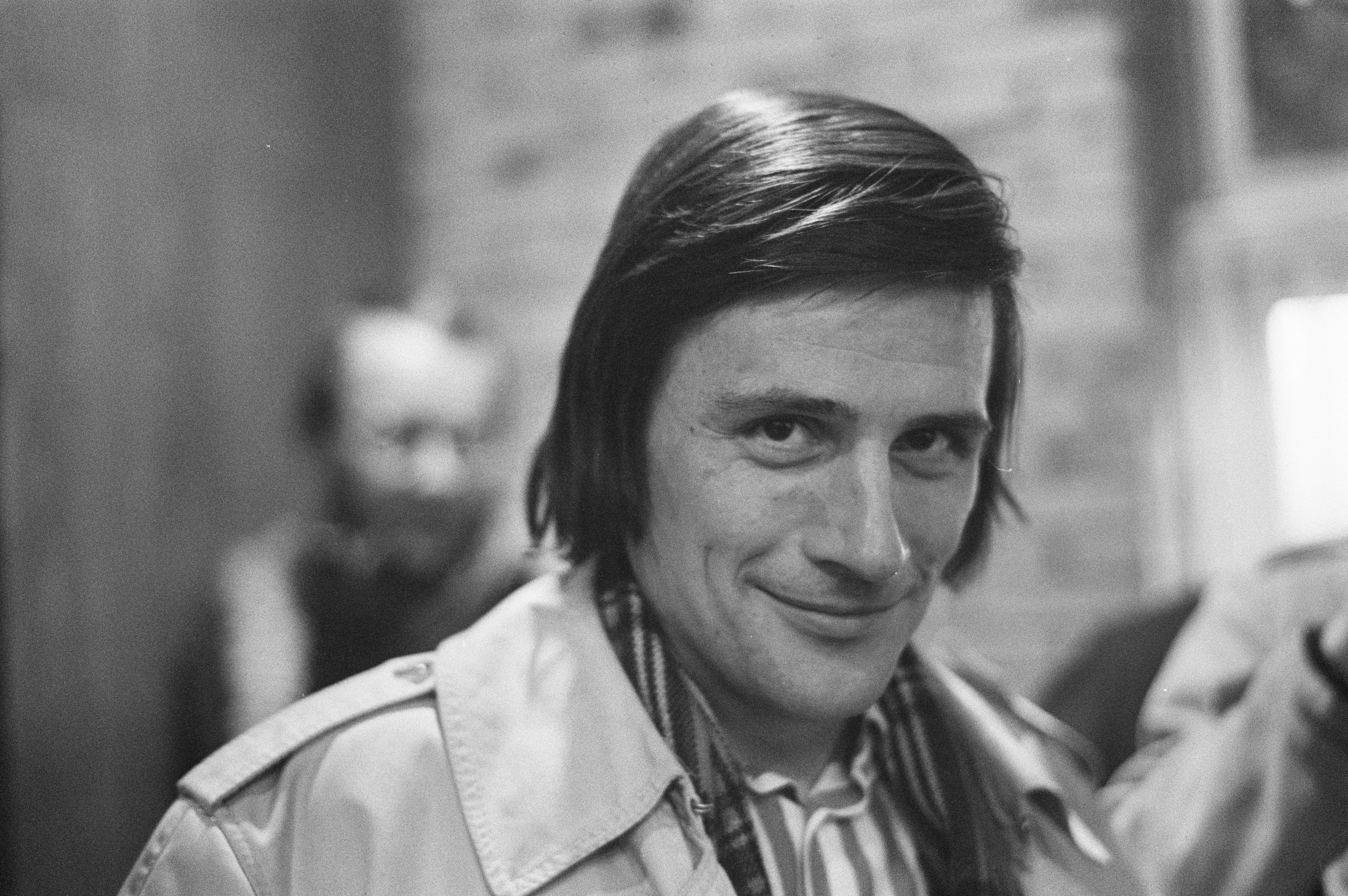
Henk Terlingen (1973)

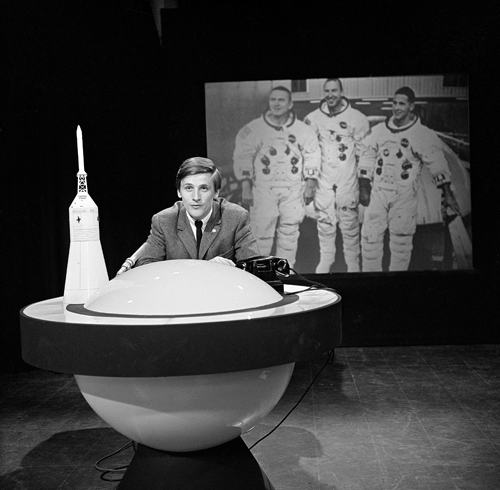
Henk Terlingen (1969)

Hendrik L. E. M. "Henk" Terlingen (born 31 August 1941 in Amsterdam, died 12 July 1994 in Geldermalsen) was a Dutch radio and television presenter.

He became notable in the Netherlands as the presenter of the Apollo lunar missions in the late 1960s, which he presented with Chriet Titulaer. He was affectionately called "Apollo Henkie" by the public. The live transmission of the Apollo 11 mission which he presented achieved an audience share of 100%, a feat never repeated on Dutch television.
