= Reconnaissance Corps =

The Reconnaissance Corps
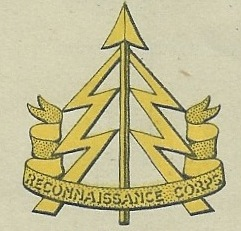
- Cap badge of the Reconnaissance Corps, 1941
- Active: 1941–1946
- Country: United Kingdom
- Branch: British Army
- Role: Military reconnaissance
- Nickname(s): The Reccies; The Recce Corps
- Motto(s): "Only The Enemy In Front"

The Reconnaissance Corps, or simply Recce Corps, was a service branch of the British Army, formed during the Second World War, whose units provided reconnaissance for infantry divisions. It was formed from infantry brigade reconnaissance groups on 14 January 1941.

All the brigade reconnaissance groups of each infantry corps were formed into reconnaissance battalions, each usually bearing the number of its relevant division. For example, the 43rd Battalion, Reconnaissance Corps (based on the 5th Battalion, Gloucestershire Regiment) was the divisional reconnaissance battalion of the 43rd (Wessex) Division.

Initially, coming from infantry units, reconnaissance units used the infantry designations of battalions, companies and platoons. However, from 6 June 1942, the Corps changed to the cavalry descriptions of regiments, squadrons and troops.

The Corps became part of the Royal Armoured Corps (RAC) in 1944, still maintaining its own cap badge with two lightning strikes supporting an upright spear. With the end of the war, this number of reconnaissance units was not needed and the Reconnaissance Corps was disbanded in August 1946. Reconnaissance duties reverted to regular armoured units of the RAC.

== Organisation and equipment ==
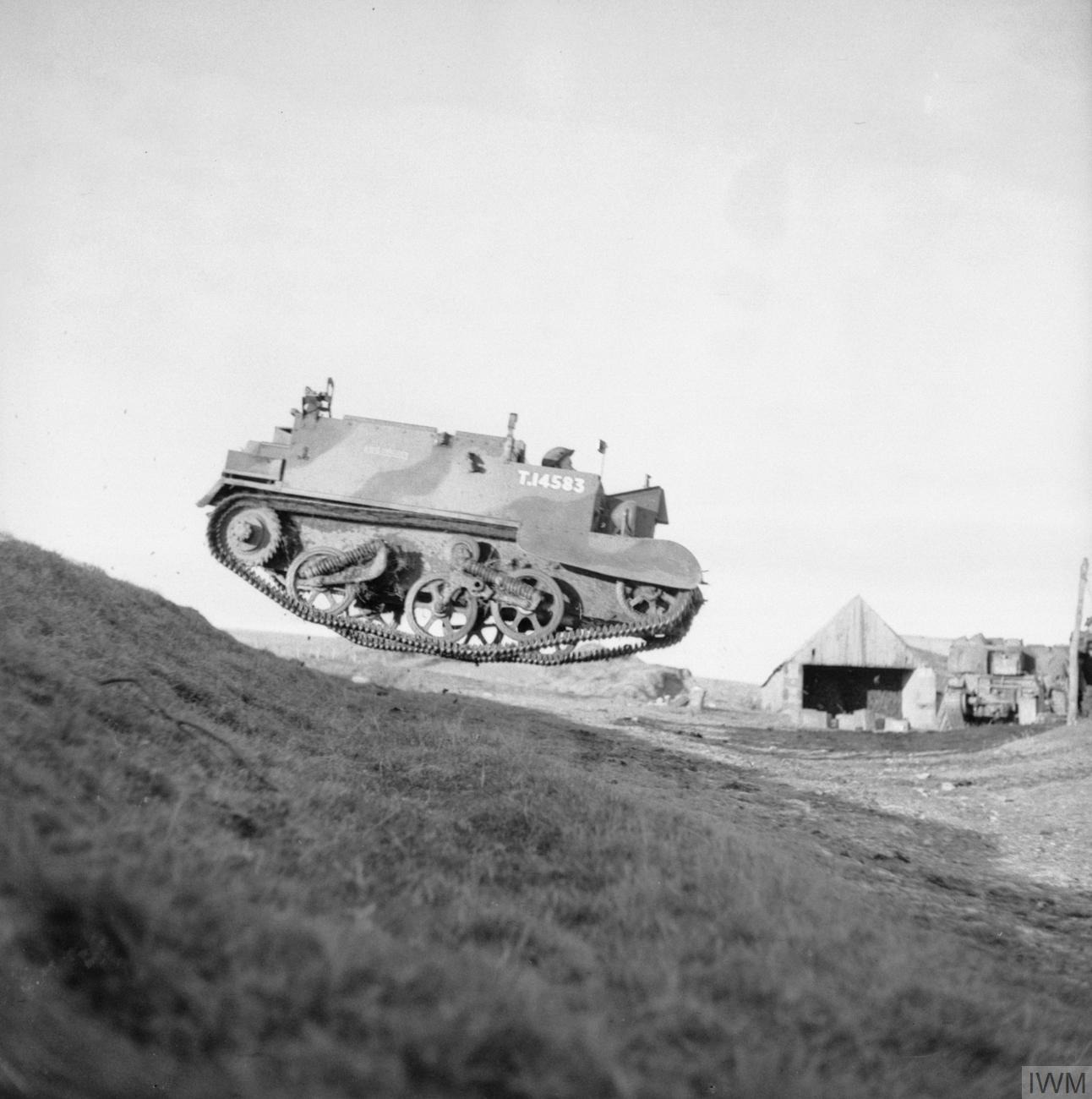
A Universal Carrier of the 52nd Reconnaissance Regiment of the 52nd (Lowland) Infantry Division, Scotland, 10 November 1942.

The Reconnaissance Corps was charged with gathering vital tactical information in battle for infantry divisions, probing ahead and screening the flanks of main advances. The training centre was established at Winchester in February 1941, until the home of the Corps moved to Catterick in Yorkshire. Although the Corps was raised from various regular army units, it did not follow that all men would be retained, as potential reconnoiterers were required to take an IQ test and other tests before being accepted. Many failed and were sent to normal infantry battalions, but those who succeeded enjoyed the kudos of belonging to an elite unit and were determined to prove their own worth. Before beginning training with his unit, each man undertook a five-week course with technical units, which determined his role as a driver, wireless operator or mechanic. Most recce men became efficient in two of these roles e.g. driver and operator. During training with a reconnaissance unit, emphasis was placed on both aggressiveness and initiative, as these were the characteristics expected of the men selected for such units, and, as a result, a proud offensive spirit was created, similar to other newly founded units such as The Parachute Regiment. Reconnaissance regiments were organised into a headquarters squadron (including anti-tank, signals and mortar troops) and three reconnaissance (or "recce") squadrons. Each recce squadron comprised three scout troops and an assault troop. Scout troops were equipped with Bren Gun Carriers and light reconnaissance cars, such as the Humber Light Reconnaissance Car. The assault troops were composed of lorried infantry and were called up when enemy resistance needed to be overcome. Later in the war, more efficient and well-armed armoured cars such as the Humber Armoured Car, Daimler Armoured Car, Staghound and Greyhound augmented the light reconnaissance cars in scout troops.

== Units ==
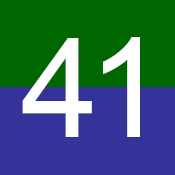
Unit sign used to identify all reconnaissance vehicles attached to infantry divisions. (The same design with the number 45 identified recce vehicles with armoured divisions)

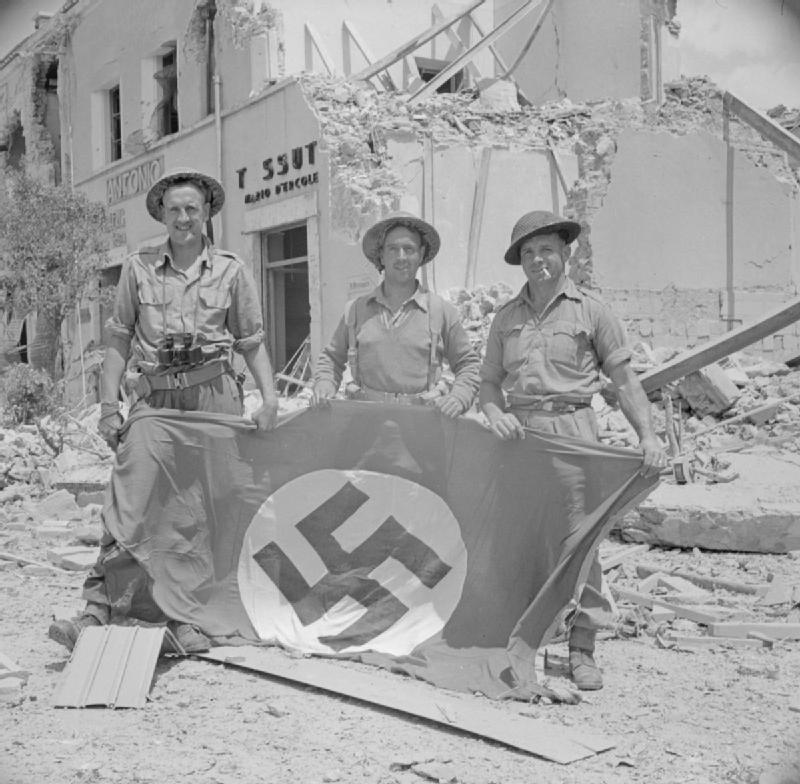
Men of the 1st Reconnaissance Regiment, part of the 1st Infantry Division, pose with a captured German swastika flag in Littoria, Italy, 25 May 1944. They are, from left to right: Corporal H. Seddon, Trooper R. Carslake and Trooper J. Callaghan.

The following units served in the Recce Corps:

- 1st Reconnaissance Regiment formed January 1941 in the 1st Infantry Division from the Hampshire Regiment.
- 2nd Reconnaissance Regiment formed April 1941 in the 2nd Infantry Division, mainly from the 6th Battalion, Loyal Regiment (North Lancashire), the division's motorcycle battalion.
- 3rd (Royal Northumberland Fusiliers) Reconnaissance Regiment formed April 1941 in the 3rd Infantry Division, from the 8th Battalion, Royal Northumberland Fusiliers, the division's motorcycle battalion.
- 4th Reconnaissance Regiment formed January 1941 mainly from the anti-tank companies of the 10th, 11th and 12th Brigades of the 4th Infantry Division.
- 5th Reconnaissance Regiment formed February 1941 in the 5th Infantry Division from the 3rd Battalion, Tower Hamlets Rifles.
- 11th (East African) Reconnaissance Regiment formed May 1943 in the 11th (East Africa) Division by conversion of the Kenya Armoured Car Regiment
- 15th Scottish Reconnaissance Regiment formed February 1943 in the 15th (Scottish) Infantry Division from the 15th, 45th and 54th Independent Reconnaissance Squadrons.
- 18th Reconnaissance Battalion formed in the 18th (East Anglian) Infantry Division from the 5th Battalion, Loyal Regiment (North Lancashire); surrendered at Singapore 1942.
- 38th Reconnaissance Regiment formed October 1943 in the 38th (Welsh) Infantry Division from the 47th, 38th and 55th Independent Reconnaissance Squadrons; disbanded October 1944, number taken by 80th (Holding) Reconnaissance Regiment.
- 43rd Reconnaissance Regiment formed from 5th Battalion, Gloucestershire Regiment transferred to the 43rd (Wessex) Infantry Division from the 48th (South Midland) Infantry Division November 1941; lost 'A' and 'C' Sqns through the sinking of the Motor Transport Ship T72 (the Derrycunihy) off Sword Beach on 24 June 1944; one replacement squadron received from the 161st Reconnaissance Regiment.
- 44th Reconnaissance Regiment formed January 1941 in the 44th (Home Counties) Infantry Division from the 7th Battalion, Queen's Own Royal West Kent Regiment; transferred to 56th (London) Infantry Division in 1943, but retained number.
- 45th Reconnaissance Regiment formed January 1941 mainly from the 134th, 135th and 136th Brigade Anti-Tank Companies of the 45th Infantry Division; transferred to 70th Infantry Division in August 1942; formed 45 and 54 Columns of the Chindits; converted to infantry and redesignated as the 2nd Battalion, South Staffordshire Regiment in October 1944.
- 46th Reconnaissance Regiment formed July 1941 in the 46th Infantry Division from the 23rd Battalion, Royal Fusiliers and the 137th, 138th and 139th Brigade Anti-Tank Companies.

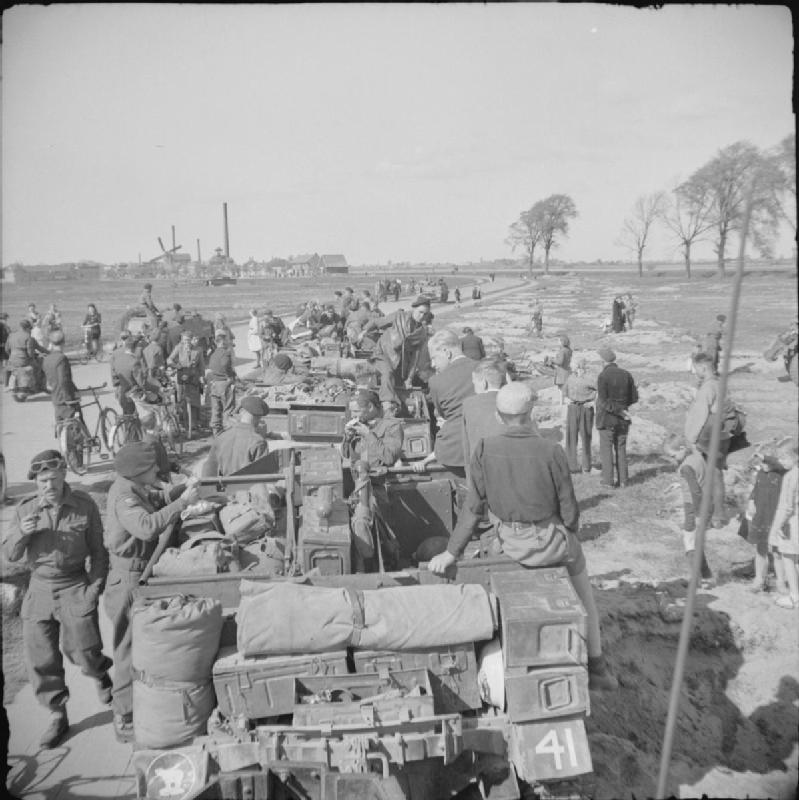
Universal Carriers of the 49th Reconnaissance Regiment are welcomed by Dutch civilians on the outskirts of Kampen, 19 April 1945.

- 49th Reconnaissance Regiment formed September 1942 in the 49th (West Riding) Infantry Division from the 29th and 148th Independent Reconnaissance Sqns, with the 1st Belgian Fusiliers as 'C' Sqn, later replaced by 24th (Guards) Independent Reconnaissance Squadron.
- 50th Reconnaissance Regiment formed April 1941 in the 50th (Northumbrian) Infantry Division from the 4th Battalion, Royal Northumberland Fusiliers, previously the division's motorcycle battalion; disbanded and remnants returned to the 4th RNF after action at the Battle of Gazala June 1942.
- 51st Reconnaissance Regiment formed February 1941 from the brigade anti-tank companies of the 51st (Highland) Infantry Division: 152 (Camerons and Seaforths) as 'A' Sqn, 153 (Gordons and Black Watch) as 'B' Sqn and 154 (Black Watch and Argylls) as 'C' Sqn; converted to infantry and redesignated as the 14th Battalion, Highland Light Infantry in January 1943.
- 52nd Reconnaissance Regiment formed January 1941 from the three Brigade Reconnaissance Groups of the 52nd (Lowland) Infantry Division: 'A' Sqn (Royal Scots and King's Own Scottish Borderers); 'B' Sqn (Royal Scots Fusiliers and Cameronians (Scottish Rifles)); 'C' Sqn (Highland Light Infantry and Gordon Highlanders).

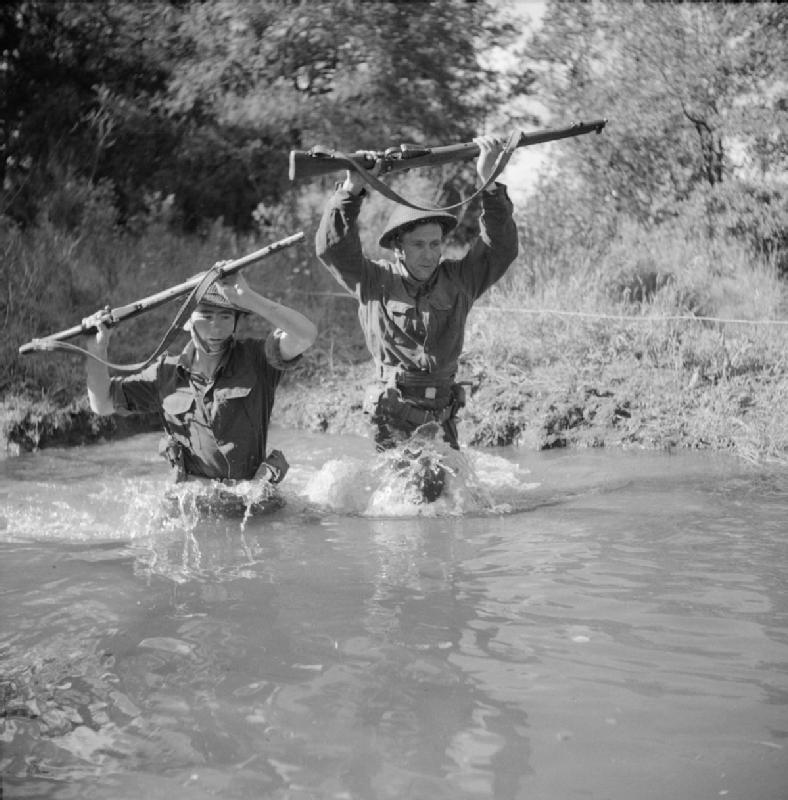
Men of the 52nd Reconnaissance Regiment of the 52nd (Lowland) Infantry Division wading through a stream during training in Scotland, 5 September 1942.

- 53rd Reconnaissance Regiment formed January 1941 from the 158th, 159th and 160th Brigade Anti-Tank Companies of the 53rd (Welsh) Infantry Division.
- 54th Reconnaissance Battalion formed July 1941 in the 54th (East Anglian) Infantry Division from the 21st Battalion, Royal Fusiliers; split into the 45th, 54th and 76th Independent Reconnaissance Squadrons in November 1941.
- 56th Reconnaissance Regiment formed January 1941 from the 167th, 168th and 169th Brigade Anti-Tank Companies of the 56th (London) Infantry Division; transferred to the 78th Infantry Division, but retained its number.

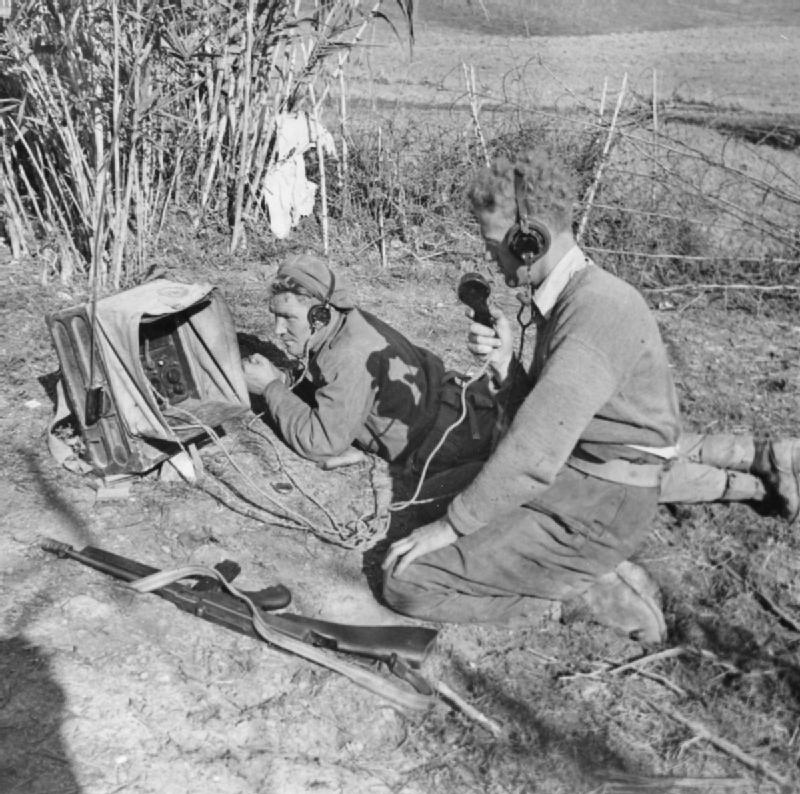
Troopers of the 78th Infantry Division's 56th Reconnaissance Regiment use a radio at an observation post overlooking the river Sangro, Italy, 7–8 November 1943.

- 59th Reconnaissance Regiment formed January 1941 in the 59th (Staffordshire) Infantry Division; disbanded 31 August 1944.
- 61st Reconnaissance Regiment formed September 1941 from the 182nd, 183rd and 184th Brigade Anti-Tank Companies of the 61st Infantry Division; transferred to the 50th (Northumbrian) Infantry Division; disbanded December 1944.
- 63rd Reconnaissance Training Centre formed January 1942, absorbed Reconnaissance Training Centre (formed January 1941) in August 1943.
- 80th (Holding and Training) Reconnaissance Regiment formed January 1943 from the 48th, 76th and 77th Independent Reconnaissance Squadrons, attached to the 80th Infantry (Reserve) Division; renumbered 38th Reconnaissance Regiment October 1944.
- 81st (West African) Reconnaissance Regiment formed in the 81st (West Africa) Infantry Division.
- 82nd (West African) Reconnaissance Regiment formed in the 82nd (West Africa) Infantry Division.
- 161st Reconnaissance Regiment converted from the 161st Regiment Royal Armoured Corps (formerly 12th Battalion, Green Howards) October 1943; attached to the 55th (West Lancashire) Infantry Division from December 1943 to July 1944, then supplied replacements, including a complete squadron to the 43rd Reconnaissance Regiment in July 1944. Attached to the new 45th Infantry Division in September 1944.
- 2nd Derbyshire Yeomanry converted from an armoured car regiment of the Royal Armoured Corps and assigned to the 51st (Highland) Infantry Division.
- 6th Armoured Airborne Reconnaissance Regiment formed in 6th Airborne Division
- GHQ Liaison Regiment (Phantom).

Independent reconnaissance squadrons
Those infantry divisions placed on a lower establishment in December 1941 only required an independent reconnaissance company/squadron; some independent brigades had a similar reconnaissance unit.

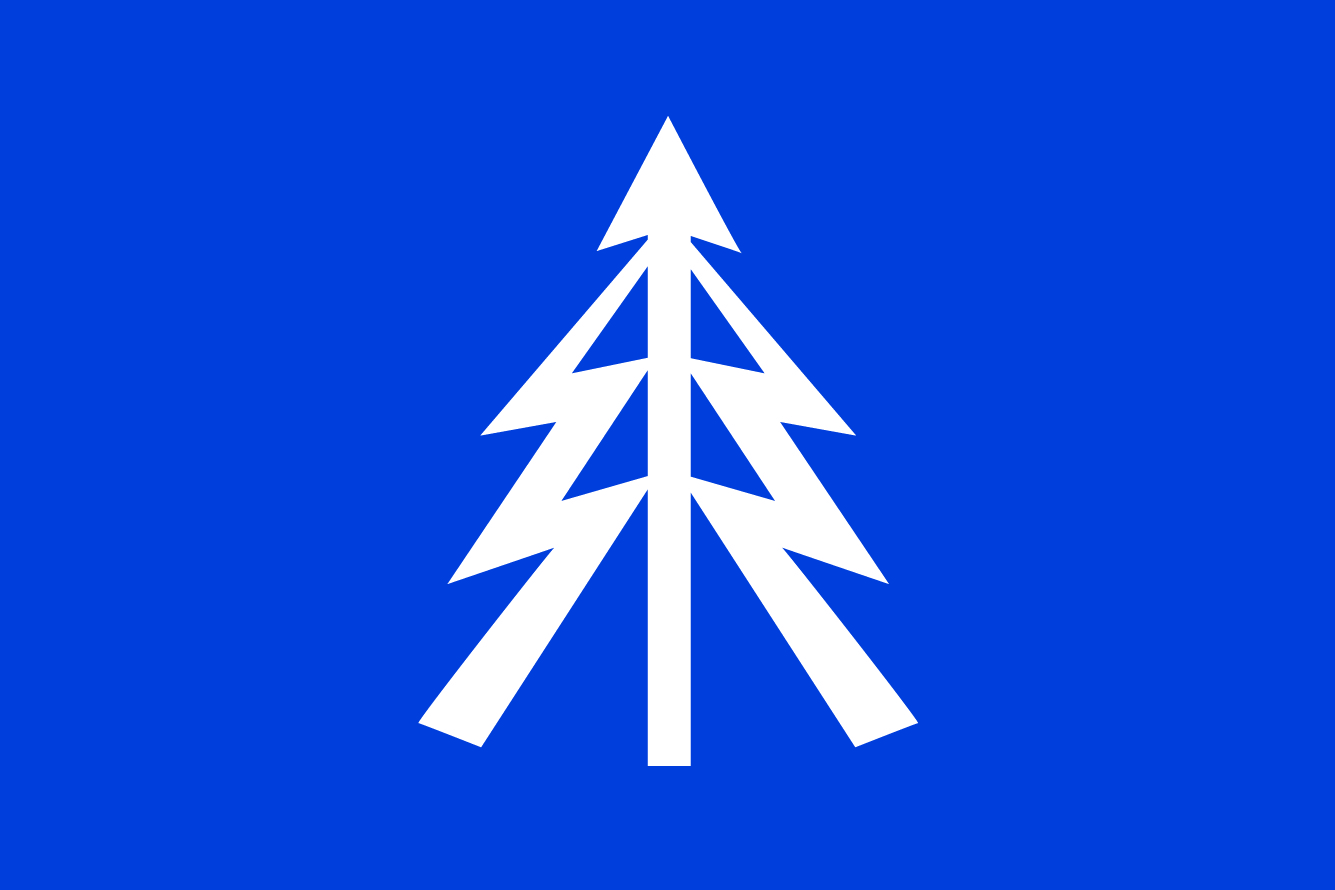
The tactical recognition flash of the 1st The Queen's Dragoon Guards is identical to the badge of the Reconnaissance Corps, except for the absence of the ribbon bearing the Corps' name

- 1st Airborne Reconnaissance Squadron
- 15th Independent Reconnaissance Squadron transferred in February 1943 to the 15th (Scottish) Reconnaissance Regiment.
- 24th (Guards) Independent Reconnaissance Squadron transferred to the 49th (West Riding) Reconnaissance Regiment.
- 29th Independent Reconnaissance Squadron transferred in September 1942 from the 78th Infantry Division to the 49th (West Riding) Reconnaissance Regiment.
- 38th Independent Reconnaissance Squadron transferred to the 38th (Welsh) Reconnaissance Regiment in October 1943
- 45th Independent Reconnaissance Squadron formed November 1941 from the 54th Reconnaissance Regiment; transferred in February 1943 to the 15th (Scottish) Reconnaissance Regiment.
- 47th Independent Reconnaissance Squadron transferred to the 38th (Welsh) Reconnaissance Regiment in October 1943
- 48th Independent Reconnaissance Squadron formed January 1942 in the 48th (South Midland) Infantry Division after the original 48th Battalion, transferred to the 43rd (Wessex) Infantry Division; transferred to the 80th (Holding and Training) Reconnaissance Regiment in January 1943
- 54th Independent Reconnaissance Squadron formed November 1941 from the 54th Reconnaissance Regiment; transferred in February 1943 to the 15th (Scottish) Reconnaissance Regiment.
- 55th Independent Reconnaissance Squadron transferred to the 38th (Welsh) Reconnaissance Regiment in October 1943
- 76th Independent Reconnaissance Squadron formed November 1941 from the 54th Reconnaissance Regiment; transferred to the 80th (Holding and Training) Reconnaissance Regiment in January 1943.
- 77th Independent Reconnaissance Squadron transferred to the 80th (Holding and Training) Reconnaissance Regiment in January 1943
- 148th Independent Reconnaissance Squadron formed January 1941 in the 148th Independent Brigade Group; transferred in September 1942 to the 49th (West Riding) Reconnaissance Regiment.

== See also ==
- Formation reconnaissance regiment, currently provided by cavalry regiments of the British Army
