= Tiger tank =

Tiger tank may refer to:

- Tiger I, or Panzerkampfwagen Tiger Ausf. E, a German heavy tank produced from 1942 to 1944
- Tiger II, or Panzerkampfwagen Tiger Ausf. B, a German heavy tank produced from 1943 to 1945, also known as Königstiger (King Tiger)
- VK 45.01 (P), or Tiger (P), a prototype of the Tiger I heavy tank designed by Porsche that was eventually redesigned into a tank destroyer
