= Hout-Blerick =

Greup
- Village
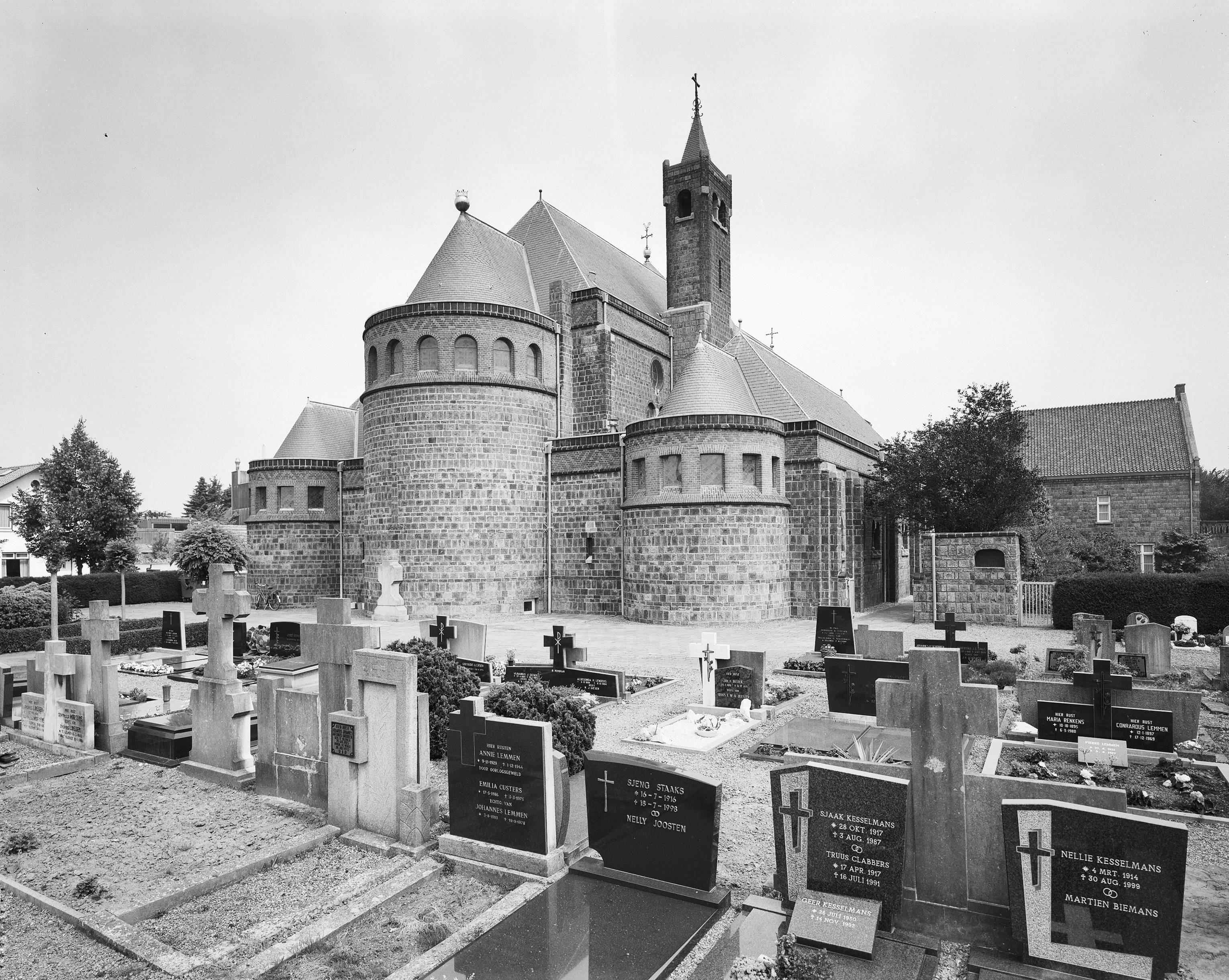
- St. Joseph's Church in Hout-Blerick
- Interactive map of Greup
- Coordinates: 51°21′22″N 6°7′48″E
- Country: Netherlands
- Province: Limburg
- Municipality: Venlo

Area
  - Total: 419 km^{2} (162 sq mi)

Population
  - Total: 3,000

Hout-Blerick (Limburgish: houtbliërik) is a village in Limburg which is part of the municipality Venlo. The village has roughly 3,000 inhabitants and has for centuries mainly been populated by people from an agricultural background. Nowadays most people work outside the village.

Hout-Blerick is notable for its historical buildings, such as the Saint Joseph Church (Dutch: Sint-Josephkerk) and several historical farms.

== Born in Hout-Blerick ==
- Chriet Titulaer, Dutch astronomer and media personality
