= Ricklingen =

- Borough of Hanover
- Location of Ricklingen in Hanover
- Interactive map of Ricklingen
- Location within Germany Location within Lower Saxony
- Coordinates: 52.340°N 9.706°E
- Country: Germany
- State: Lower Saxony
- City: Hanover
- Subdivisions: 5 quarters

Area
  - Total: 14.71 km^{2} (5.68 sq mi)

Population (2020-12-31)
  - Total: 45,673
  - Density: 3,105/km^{2} (8,042/sq mi)
- Time zone: UTC+01:00 (CET)
  - Summer (DST): UTC+02:00 (CEST)
- Dialling codes: 0511

Ricklingen (German pronunciation: [ˈʁɪklɪŋən]) is a borough and a quarter of Hanover, in Lower Saxony, and in Germany. The borough Ricklingen consists of the quarters Bornum, Mühlenberg, Oberricklingen, Ricklingen and Wettbergen.

It is the home of Rugby football sports club DRC Hannover which won the German rugby trophy in 2002, 2003 and 2006, and the Eurocup in 1999.

== Population ==
The borough's population has been rising steadily since 2005.

Population of Ricklingen since 2005
