= Chriet Titulaer =

Dutch astronomer, TV presenter and writer

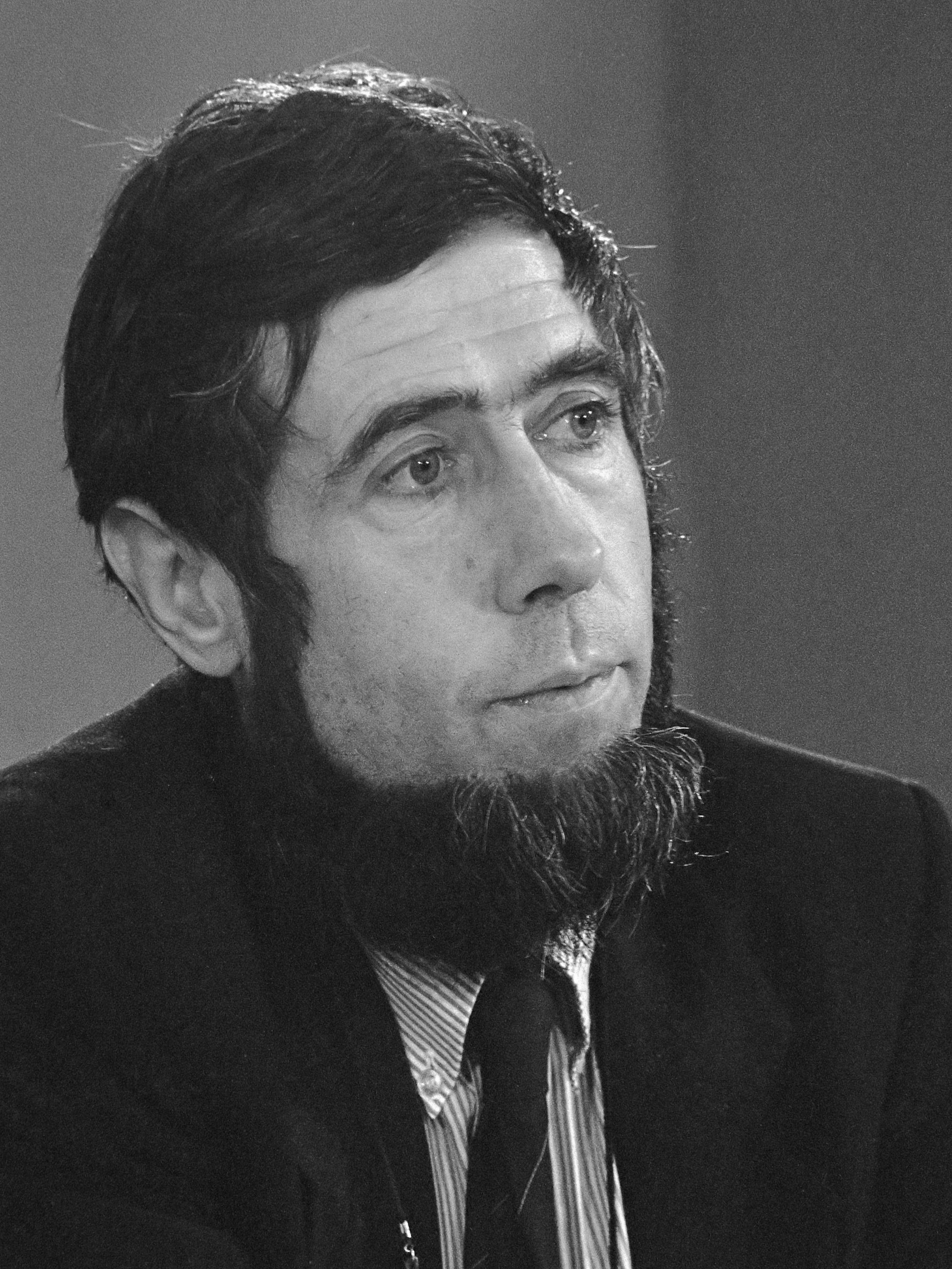
- Born: May 9, 1943; Venlo, Netherlands
- Died: 23 April 2017 (aged 73); Driebergen, Netherlands
- Occupations: Astronomer; television presenter; writer
- Years active: 1969–1990 (television)

Chriet Titulaer (Dutch pronunciation: [ˈxri(t) tityˈlaːr]; May 9, 1943 – April 23, 2017) was a Dutch astronomer, television presenter and popular science and technology writer.

== Biography ==
Titulaer was born in the Hout-Blerick village in Venlo, Limburg, and went to high school at the St.-Thomascollege in Venlo (now the Valuas College). He studied maths and physics at the University of Utrecht with a major in astronomy. At the university he joined the student association CS Veritas. During his studies he founded (together with Ton Smit) the Venlo chapter of the Nederlandse Vereniging voor Weer- en Sterrenkunde (Dutch association for meteorology and astronomy) on April 18, 1965 (since 1990 known as the Weer- en Sterrenkundige Vereniging "Jean Delsing").

The next year he organized the exposition Mens en het Heelal (Man and the Universe), then the largest meteorology, astronomy and space travel exposition ever held in the Netherlands.

After having lived and worked in the United States and France (both for two years) he became a presenter of Dutch radio and television programmes about science and technology. Between 1969 and 1990 he was often seen on television. His popularity began as co-presenter of the live transmission of the Apollo 11 Moon landing (as well as the later Moon landings), together with Henk Terlingen (popularly known as "Apollo Henkie"). The transmission rated at an audience share of 100%, a feat never again repeated on Dutch television. He also was the commentator for the first launch of Space Shuttle Columbia in 1981.

=== Television producer and writer ===
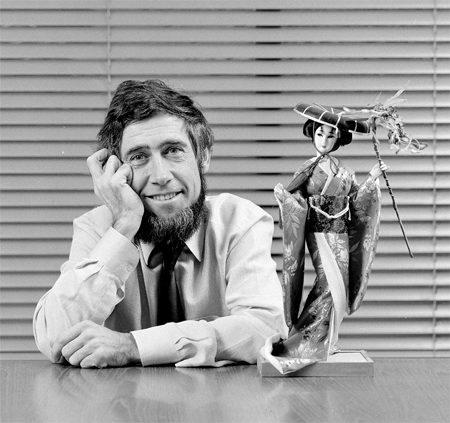
Chriet Titulaer in 1984

In 1983 Titulaer began his own television production company Chriet Titulaer Producties BV and did much work for Teleac and the TROS. He presented popular science programmes such as Wondere Wereld (Miraculous World) and television courses such as Moderne Sterrenkunde (Modern Astronomy) and Nederland en het Weer (The Netherlands and the Weather).

=== Later activities ===
In 1986 he organized the space travel exhibition Space '86 in the Jaarbeurs in Utrecht. As a promotion a true to size painting of a Saturn V rocket was put on the side of the Dom Tower of Utrecht as both the rocket and the church tower are about 110 metres tall. Titulaer wrote many books about popular science, computers, IT, meteorology and astronomy. He was an active advocate for science and technology and was often asked as a keynote speaker for events related to these areas, and for theme days on schools and universities. His appearances on radio and television became relatively rare.

He founded projects such as the now defunct Huis van de Toekomst (House of the Future), Kantoor van de Toekomst (Office of the Future) and the Ziekenhuis van de Toekomst (Hospital of the Future). He also co-initiated the recreation and education park for astronomy and space travel Cosmo Science Center in North Brabant.

=== Personal life ===
Titulaer lived in Houten, Utrecht.

== Trivia ==
- After the Apollo program was cancelled in the early 1970s Titulaer visited the Rockwell factory and saw one of the unfinished Apollo capsules standing there which had been under construction for one of the cancelled flights at a cost of US$10 million. Jokingly he said he would buy it for $1 and to his surprise the Rockwell representative accepted his offer and held him to the purchase. Martin Schröder, president of Martinair, who was also there said he would stick it in the back of his Boeing 747. The capsule didn't fit through the plane's doors so Titulaer had it shipped to the Netherlands. There it stood in the backyard of his house as a garden ornament for many years until a Japanese gentleman rang his doorbell and offered to buy the capsule for 30,000 Dutch guilders, which Titulaer accepted.
- An asteroid is named after him: 12133 Titulaer.
- Public transport company Veolia Transport named one of their former Velios trains after Titulaer.
- His Abraham Lincoln style beard and his soft G resulted in a striking appearance, instantly recognizable in the Netherlands.
- Titulaer's given name is the short form of Christiaan or Christoffel in Limburg.
- Several Dutch comedians such as Hilbert Elskamp, Robert Paul, Diederik van Vleuten, André van Duin and Wim de Bie did comic impressions of him.

== Bibliography ==
- Operatie maan (verslag in woord en beeld van de ruimtevaart en maanlanding) (1969)
- Maanonderzoek (1969)
- Elseviers atlas van de planeten (1971)
- Het Grote Hemelboek (1972)
- Apollo, dossier van het project (1973)
- Ruimtevaart, moet dat nou? (1974)
- Landing op Mars (1975)
- Het grote planetenboek (1976)
- Leven op andere planeten (1976)
- De mens in het heelal (1977)
- De mens en het weer (1979)
- Van Spoetnik tot spaceshuttle (1979)
- Televisiesatellieten (1980)
- Toekomstbeeld (video, kabeltelevisie, satelliettelevisie, huiscomputer, viditel, teletekst) (1980)
- Fotografie bij de politie (1981)
- De mens in de ruimte (1981)
- Een kwart eeuw ruimtevaart (Teleac course book, 1982)
- De mens en de computer (1983)
- Bijblijven met de nieuwe media (1983)
- Het grote hemelboek (1985), ISBN 90-218-3481-2
- De mens in de kosmos (1985), ISBN 90-10-05560-4
- Het robotboek (1986), ISBN 4-490-10131-7
- Tros Wondere wereld woordenboek (1986)
- Space 86 (1986), ISBN 90-218-3633-5
- Kunstmatige intelligentie (1987), ISBN 90-218-3812-5
- Van Edison tot CD-video (1988)
- De micro-elektronica revolutie (1988), ISBN 90-70111-51-9
- Toekomst in telecommunicatie (1988), ISBN 90-72692-02-0
- Praktisch woordenboek nieuwe media (1989), ISBN 90-6152-546-2
- Welkom in de toekomst (1990), ISBN 90-274-2674-0
- Kantoor van de toekomst (1991), ISBN 90-274-3027-6
- Huis van de toekomst (1992), ISBN 90-05-17027-1
- Welkom in het kantoor van de toekomst (1996)
- Welkom in 2000 (1993), ISBN 90-274-3382-8
- Mijn biografie (1997), ISBN 90-5121-716-1
