= Alice Dease =

Irish writer and folklorist (1874–1949)

- Born: Alice Mary Frances Dease; 14 February 1874; Turbotstown, Coole, County Westmeath
- Died: 27 October 1949 (age 75); Dundrum, County Dublin
- Other names: Alice Mary Chicester
- Occupations: Writer, folklorist
- Relatives: Maurice Dease (nephew)

Alice Mary Frances Dease Chichester (14 February 1874 – 27 October 1949) was an Irish Catholic writer and folklorist. She wrote stories based on Irish history, folklore, and country life for adult and child audiences, and wrote educational materials for the Catholic Truth Society. She also wrote a novel, Refining Fires (1915), and several stories about Catholic mission work in China and Mexico.

== Biography ==
Dease was born at Turbotstown House, a historic house in Coole, County Westmeath, the tenth daughter and youngest child of Irish landowners, James Arthur Dease and Charlotte Jerningham. Her father died when she was an infant. Two of her sisters were Catholic nuns. She married Philip Charles Chichester in 1915. Her husband died in 1930, and she died in County Dublin in 1949, at the age of 75.

Her nephew Maurice Dease earned the Victoria Cross posthumously in 1914, for heroism at the Battle of Mons.

== Publications ==
For over thirty years, Dease wrote about local history and folklore, and published short stories in magazines. She also wrote "penny booklets" for the Catholic Truth Society. Her stories were published in several volumes, including at least two volumes of stories about Catholic missions in China. "Miss Dease shows the drab texture of the peasants' lives shot through and transfigured with their wonderful faith", wrote a reviewer of her story collection Down West, and Other Sketches of Irish Life (1914). One of her stories, "A Glimpse of the Purple", was included in The Best Stories by the Foremost Catholic Authors (volume 5, 1910).

=== Fiction and folklore ===
- Good Women of Erin: The Story of their Heroic Lives and Deeds (1905)
- Old-Time Stories of Erin (1907, for young readers)
- The Beckoning of the Wand: Sketches of a Lesser Known Ireland (1908)
- Mother Erin: Her People and Her Places (1909, for young readers)
- Good Men of Erin (1910)
- A Priest and His Boys: The Story of a Country Parish (1911)
- Chinese Lanterns (1911)
- "A Chinese Tale" (1911)
- :"Père Emmanuel's Vocation" (1912, short story)
- Some Irish Stories (1912)
- The Lady of Mystery (1913)
- "Our Lady's Mission" (1913, short story)
- Down West, and Other Sketches of Irish Life (1914)
- Refining Fires (1915, novel)
- "The Hollow of the Mass" (1915, short story)
- "The Harvest Fields of Ballywater" (1917, short story)
- "Under the Silver Box" (1918, short story)
- "The Goupil Millions" (1919, short story)
- The Debt of Guy Arnolle (1919)
- With the French Red Cross: Tales Founded on Fact
- Learnt from Lifu, and Other Stories
- Bluegowns: A Golden Treasury of Tales of The China Missions (1927)
- "The Church of the Tangled Web" (1930, short story)
- "Christofero of Mexico" (1937, short story)

=== Booklets for the Catholic Truth Society ===
- "The Foundress of the Living Rosary" (1915, booklet for the Catholic Truth Society, about Pauline Jaricot)
- "The Rosary in the Holy Land" (1915, booklet for the Catholic Truth Society)
- "Letters to a Girl from a Well-Wisher" (booklet for the Catholic Truth Society)
- "The Mass: Our Splendid Privilege" (compiler)
