= Canal du Centre (Belgium) =

Canal in Belgium

Coordinates: 50°28′41″N 4°06′36″E

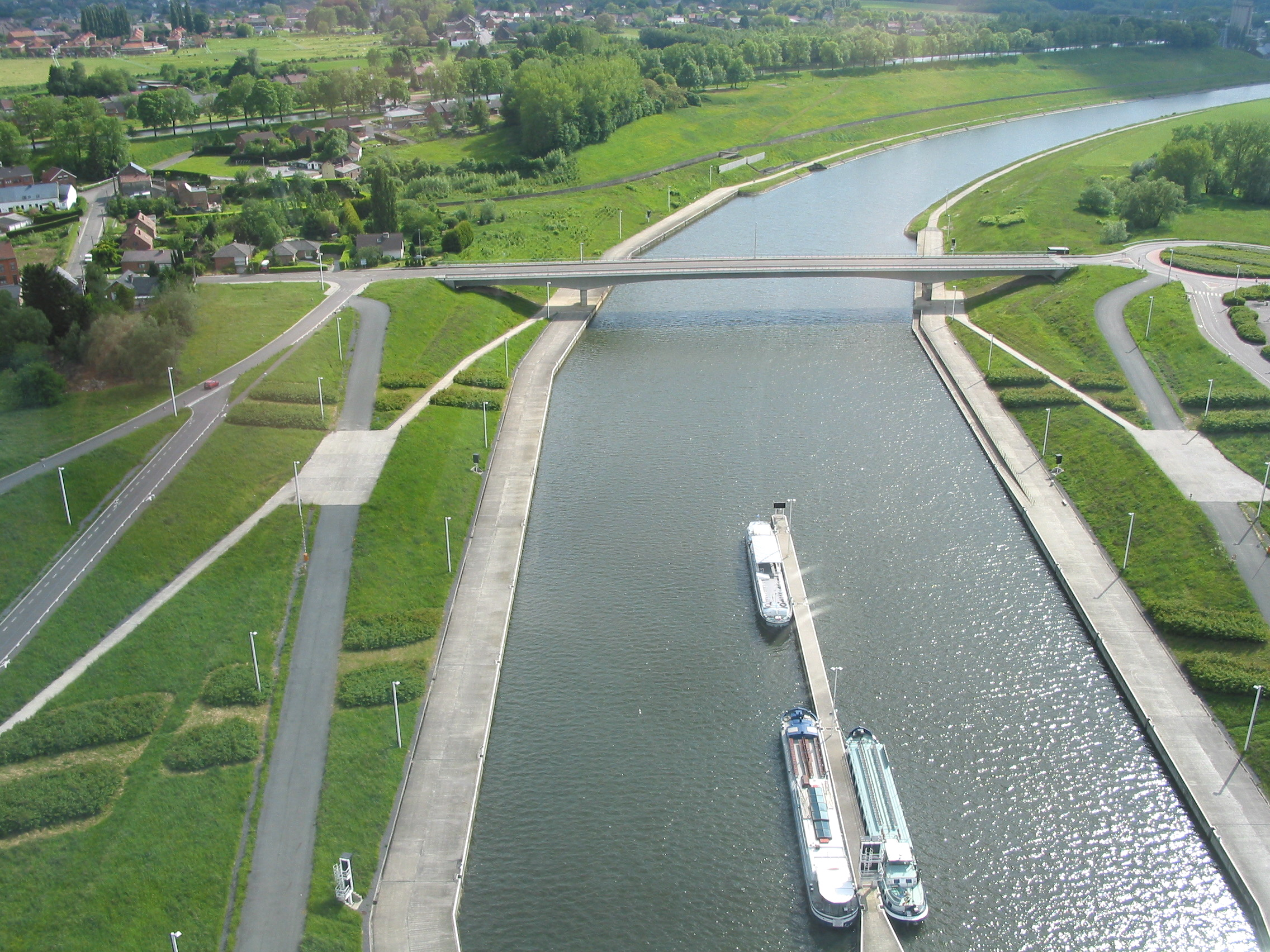
- View of new canal section, from the Strépy-Thieu lift
- Interactive map of Canal du Centre

History
- Construction began: 1888
- Date of first use: 1917

Geography
- Start point: Brussels–Charleroi Canal
- End point: Grand Large, Mons

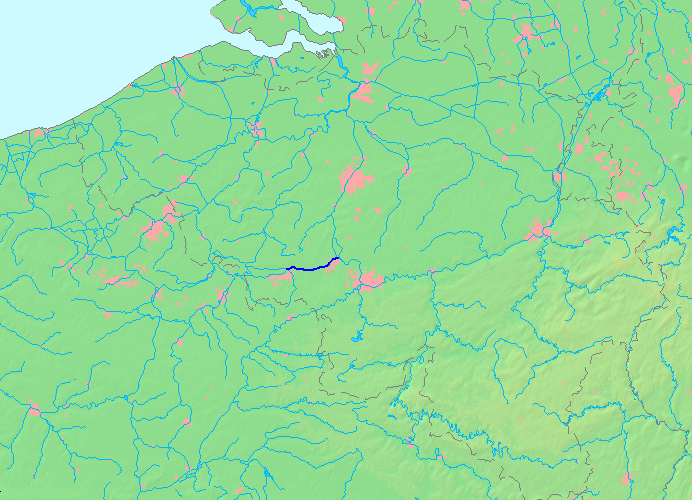
The location of the Canal du Centre in Belgium

The Canal du Centre (French pronunciation: [kanal dy sɑ̃tʁ]) is a canal in Wallonia, Belgium, which, with other canals, links the waterways of the Meuse and Scheldt rivers. It has a total length of 20.9 km (13.0 miles). It connects the artificial lake Grand Large near Nimy, with the Brussels–Charleroi Canal near Seneffe.

== Route ==
The canal begins in the west at Mons, and passes through the towns of Nimy, Obourg, Ville-sur-Haine, and Thieu. This section is 15 km (9.3 miles) long, and has a relief of 23.26 metres (76.3 feet). The canal climbs by means of six locks. There are five locks with a relief of 4.2 m (14 feet), and a final lock with a relief of 2.26 m (7 ft 5 in) at Thieu.

The next section of the original canal route between Thieu and Houdeng-Gœgnies climbs 66 metres (217 feet) over a distance of 6,790 m (22,280 feet), which is too steep a climb for canal locks. Therefore, this section contains four hydraulic boat lifts, dating from 1888 to 1917, which are now on the UNESCO World Heritage list (see Boat Lifts on the Canal du Centre). These lifts were designed by Edwin Clark of the British company Clark, Stansfield & Clark. For commercial traffic this stretch of the canal has, since 2002, been replaced by an enlarged parallel canal.

== History ==
=== Old canal ===
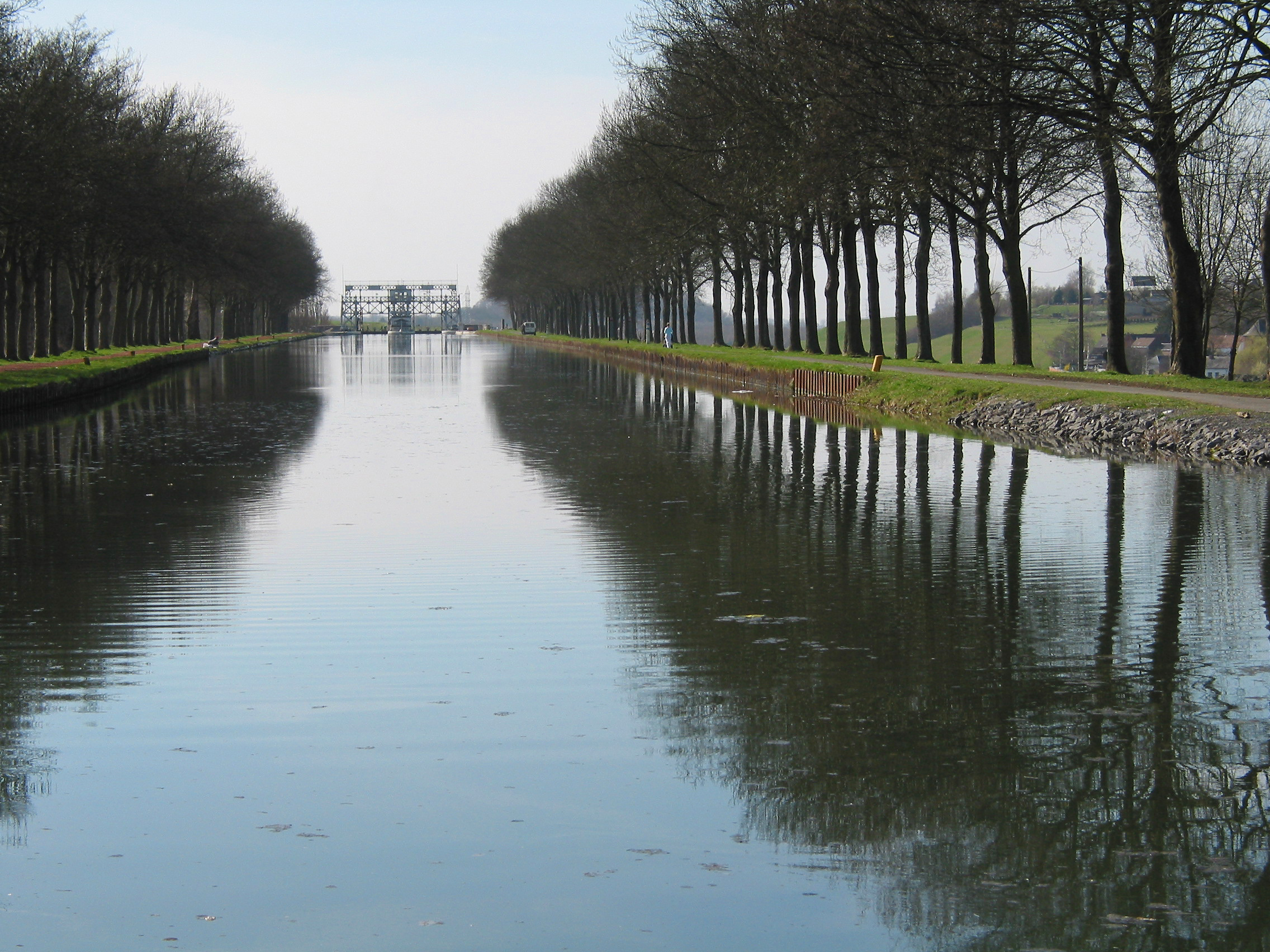
Old section of the canal, and boat lift no. 4

For centuries, Belgian people had wanted an inland waterway to connect the Meuse and the Scheldt. However, the height difference of about 96 metres (315 ft) between the two rivers would require as many as 32 locks, which was not feasible. In 1879, the Ministry of Public Works adopted a proposal by Edwin Clark which used boat lifts instead of locks. The first lift (Houdeng-Gœgnies) was built between 1885 and 1888. It was inaugurated on June 4, 1888 by King Leopold II. The three other boat lifts were finally finished in 1917 and put into service in 1919. There were several reasons for this delay. From 1894 to 1911, the economic need for the canal was repeatedly called into question. Then in 1914, when the three lifts were practically finished, World War I began.

=== New canal ===
The old canal could accommodate boats with a displacement of up to 350 tons. In 1957 the Belgian parliament passed a law providing for a major expansion of the canal, increasing the maximum displacement of a boat that could use the canal to 1,350 tonnes (1,490 tons). In the event, it was decided to alter the course of the canal rather than to enlarge it along the full extent of its existing length. A defining feature of the enlarged canal was the Strépy-Thieu boat lift which replaced the four smaller boat lifts and one or two locks which had been part of the former canal.

The Canal du Centre was opened to boats with a displacement of 1,350 tonnes in September 2002. Between 2000 and 2004 the annual ship transits increased from 1,531 to 4,041 while the tonnage carried increased from 282,000 to 1,513,000.

The lifts on the old parallel canal remain in position, having in 1998 been designated a UNESCO World Heritage Site.
