= Sidney Godley =

Recipient of the Victoria Cross

Sidney Godley VC
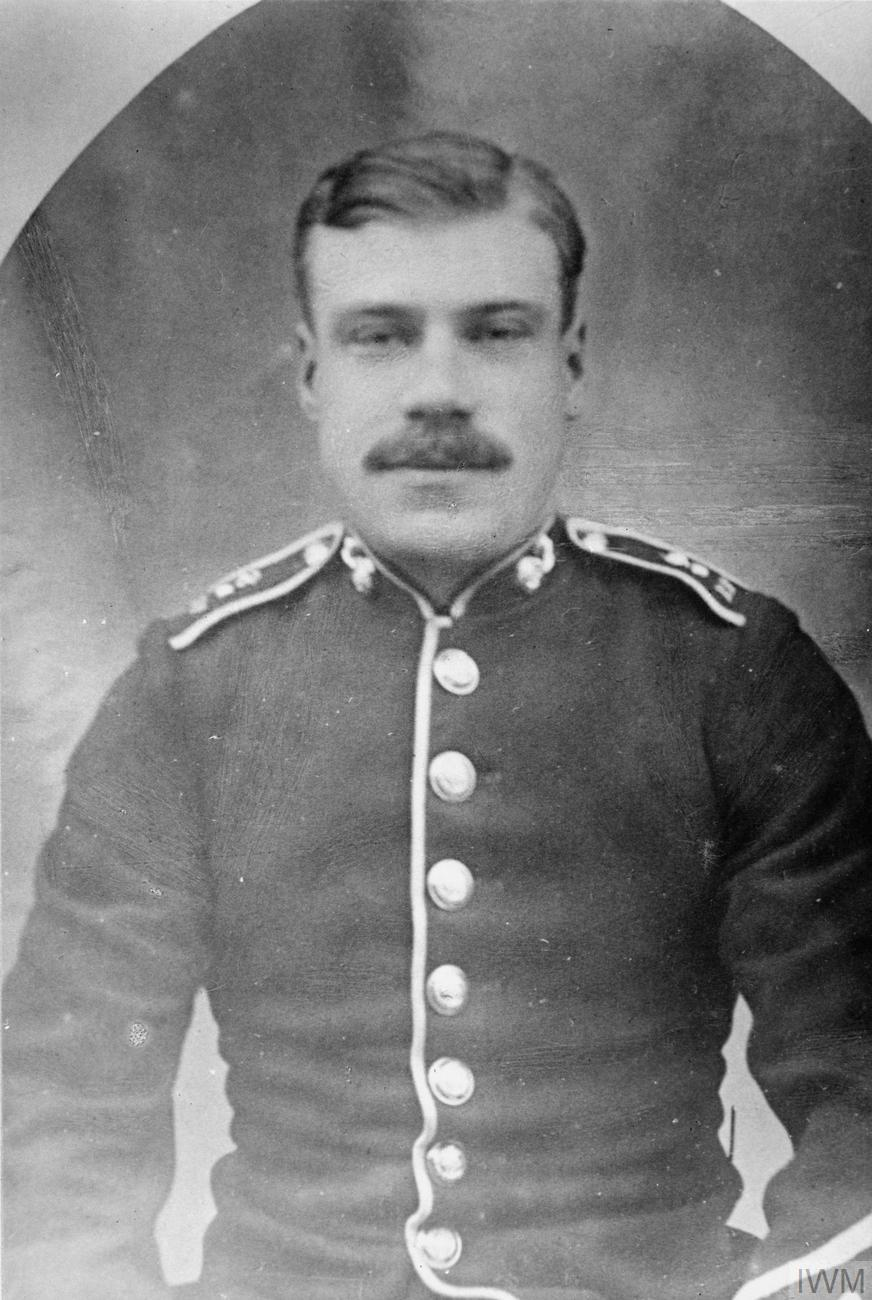
- Born: 16 August 1889; East Grinstead, Sussex, England
- Died: 29 June 1957 (aged 67); Epping, Essex, England
- Burial place: Loughton Town Cemetery, Loughton, Essex, England
- Spouse: Ellen Eliza Norman
- Military career
- Allegiance: United Kingdom
- Branch: British Army
- Service years: 1909–1919
- Rank: Private
- Service number: 13814
- Units: Royal Fusiliers
- Conflicts: World War I
- Awards: Victoria Cross

Private Sidney Frank Godley VC (14 August 1889 – 29 June 1957) was an English recipient of the Victoria Cross, the highest and most prestigious award for gallantry in the face of the enemy that can be awarded to British and Commonwealth forces. He was the first private soldier awarded the VC in World War I.

== Early life ==
Godley was born on 14 August 1889 in East Grinstead, West Sussex, the son of Avis (née Newton) and Frank Godley. His mother died in 1896, and he was sent to live with his aunt and uncle in Willesden, London. He was educated at Henry Street School, St John's Wood and, upon moving to Sidcup, at Sidcup National School. From the ages of fourteen to twenty, he worked in an ironmonger's store.

On 13 December 1909, he enlisted in The Royal Fusiliers (City of London Regiment), under Regular terms of service, as a private with the service number 13814, to serve seven years with the colours, and the remaining five years in the Army Reserve. He appears on the 1911 Census at Stanhope Lines, Aldershot with the 4th Battalion.

== Victoria Cross ==
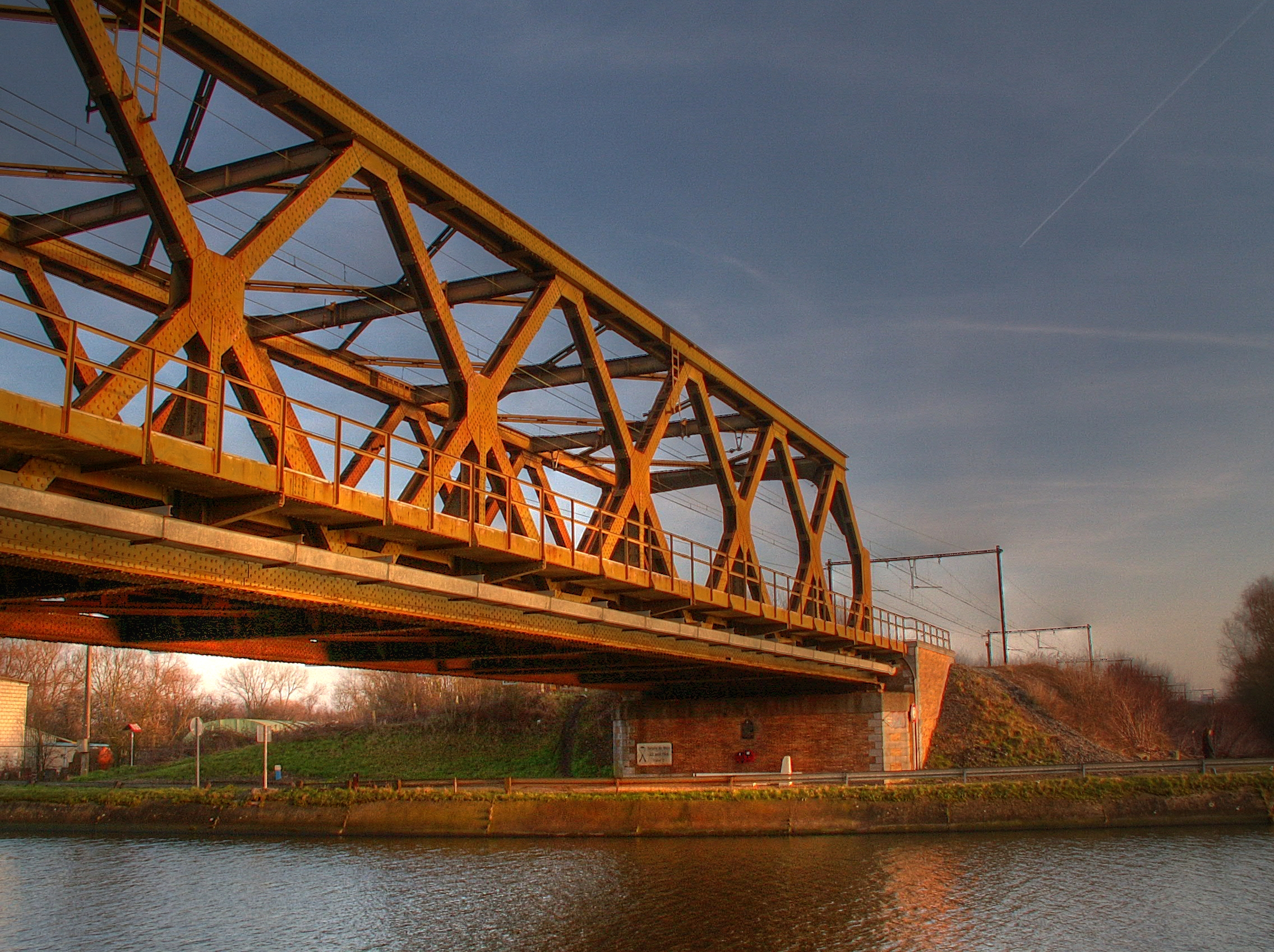
Nimy railway bridge; the memorial plaque is below.

Godley was 25 years old, and a Fusilier in the 4th Battalion, The Royal Fusiliers, British Army, during the Battle of Mons in the First World War when he performed an act for which he was awarded the Victoria Cross.

On 23 August 1914, at Mons, Belgium on the Mons-Condé Canal, Lieutenant Maurice Dease and Sidney Godley were manning the machine gun after the previous crews were either killed or wounded. When Lieutenant Dease had been mortally wounded and killed, and the order to retreat was issued, Private Godley offered to defend the Nimy Railway Bridge while the rest of the section retreated. Godley held the bridge single-handed under very heavy fire and was wounded twice. A shell fragment ("shrapnel") entered his back when an artillery shell went off near him, and he was wounded in the head by a bullet. Despite his injuries he carried on the defence of the bridge while his comrades escaped. His citation read: "For coolness and gallantry in fighting his machine gun under a hot fire for two hours after he had been wounded at Mons on 23 August".

H.C. O'Neill wrote this account of Godley's actions in The Royal Fusiliers in the Great War.

"The machine gun crews were constantly being knocked out. So cramped was their position that when a man was hit he had to be removed before another could take his place. The approach from the trench was across the open, and whenever a gun stopped Lieutenant Maurice Dease... went up to see what was wrong. To do this once called for no ordinary courage. To repeat it several times could only be done with real heroism. Dease was badly wounded on these journeys, but insisted on remaining at duty as long as one of his crew could fire. The third wound proved fatal, and a well deserved VC was awarded him posthumously. By this time both guns had ceased firing, and all the crew had been knocked out. In response to an inquiry whether anyone else knew how to operate the guns Private Godley came forward. He cleared the emplacement under heavy fire and brought the gun into action. But he had not been firing long before the gun was hit and put completely out of action. The water jackets of both guns were riddled with bullets, so that they were no longer of any use. Godley himself was badly wounded and later fell into the hands of the Germans.

Godley defended the bridge for two hours, until he ran out of ammunition. His final act was to dismantle the gun and throw the pieces into the canal.

He attempted to crawl to safety, but advancing German soldiers caught him and took him prisoner. His wounds were treated by his captors. Originally it was thought that he had been killed, but in March 1915 it came to light that he was a prisoner of war in a camp called Delotz at Dallgow-Döberitz. It was in the camp that he was informed by the American Ambassador that he had been awarded the Victoria Cross. He remained in captivity until the Armistice with Germany in November 1918. Godley left the camp in 1918 after the guards fled their posts. His repatriation was formally confirmed in January 1919. He received the actual medal from King George V, at Buckingham Palace, on 15 February 1919.

On 19 July 2012 his medals were sold at auction for £276,000.

== Post-war life ==
On 2 August 1919, Godley married Ellen Eliza Norman. He worked as a school caretaker in Tower Hamlets, London. He died in Epping Hospital on 29 June 1957. He was buried with full military honours in the town cemetery at Loughton, Essex, where he latterly resided.

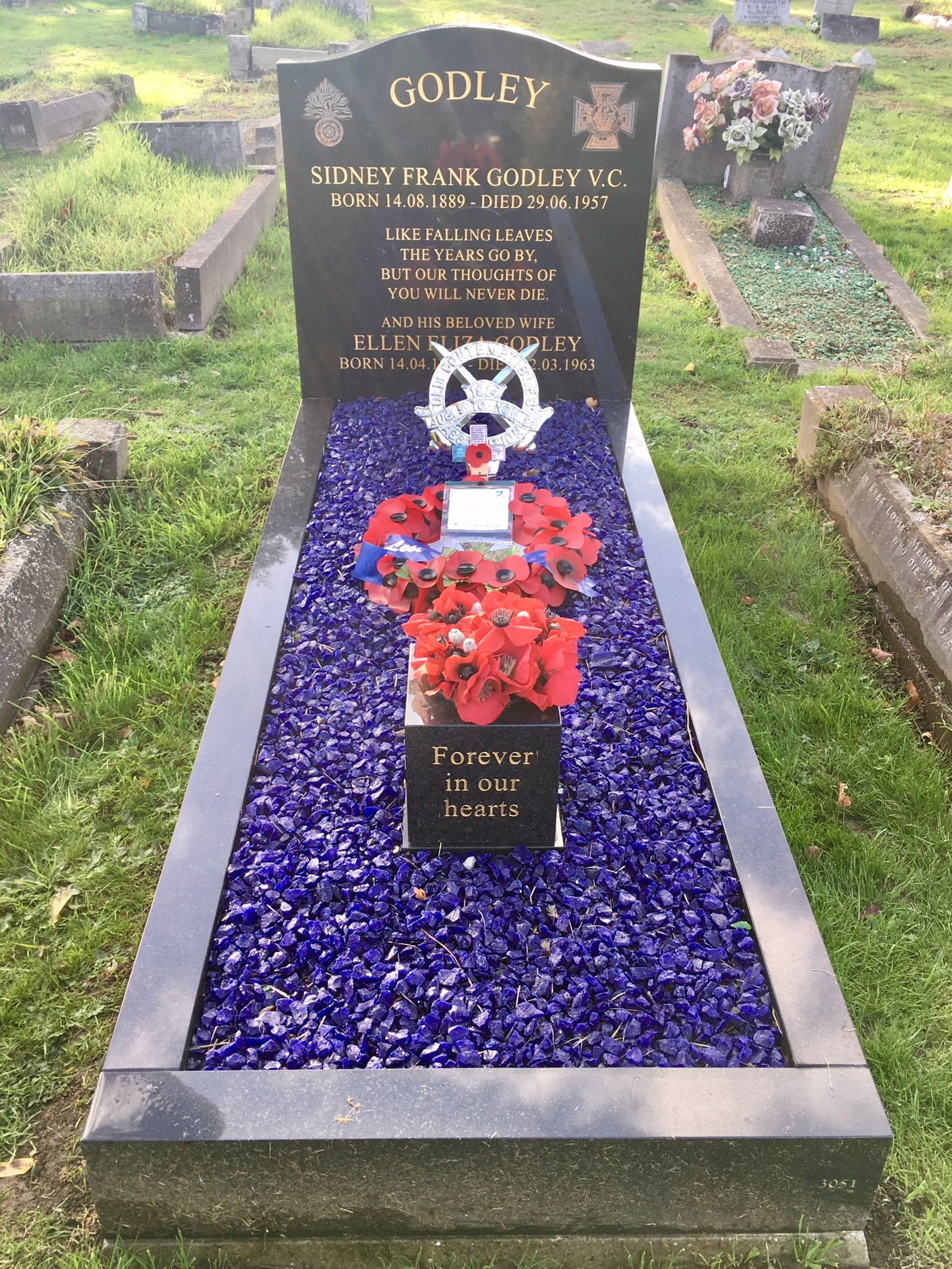
The grave of Sidney Godley in Loughton Cemetery, Essex

He was portrayed in the BBC Three series Our World War (2014) by Theo Barklem-Biggs.

== Memorials ==
- East Grinstead Town Council mounted a Blue Plaque on their offices.
- Loughton Town Council placed a Blue Plaque at 164 Torrington Drive to commemorate its famous former resident. On 23 August 2014, exactly 100 years to the hour from when he defended the bridge at Mons, a commemorative service was held at his graveside.
- in 1976 a new housing estate in Bexley, Greater London, was named after him.
- In 1992 Tower Hamlets Council named a block of flats "Godley VC House" (Digby Street, E2). A plaque attached to the flats also commemorates him.
- In 2014 the Department of Communities and Local Government gave each birth town of a World War I VC winner a paving stone to commemorate their deed. The paving stone in East Grinstead was unveiled by the Town Mayor with Communities Secretary Eric Pickles MP in attendance, at 11.00 am on 23 August 2014. This was the first day of unveilings. The paving stone is set at the base of the war memorial in East Grinstead High Street, as the original wish that they be incorporated in the pavement in front of the former home was not possible as the exact address of his home is not known.
- A small residential area in rue des Victoria Cross ("Victoria Crosses street") in Saint-Symphorien near Mons, Belgium is named Clos Sidney Godley ("Sidney Godley Enclosed Field").
