= Ghlin =

Sub-municipality of the city of Mons, Belgium

Ghlin Glin-dlé-Mont (Walloon)
- Sub-municipality of Mons
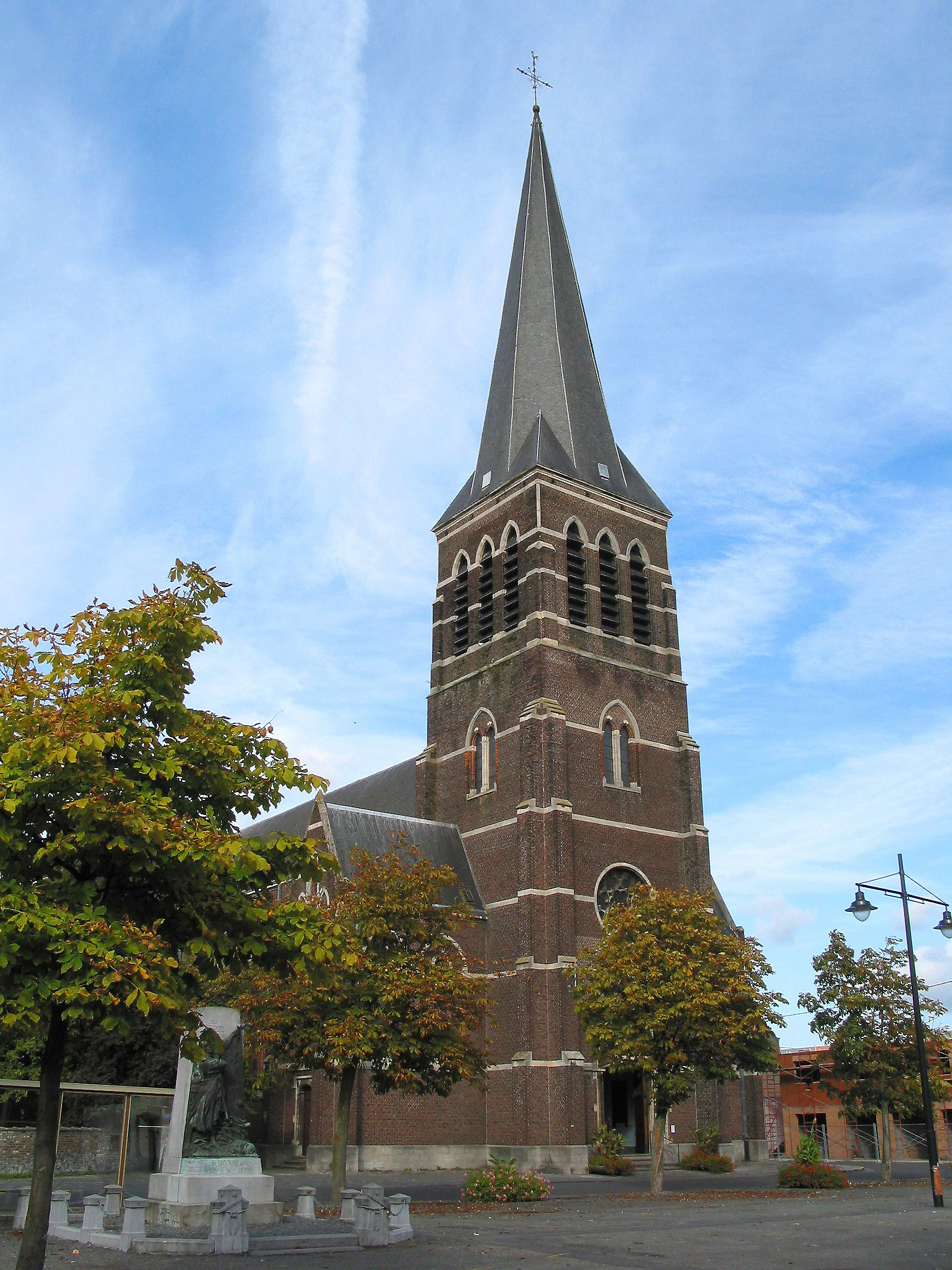
- Saint-Martin Church

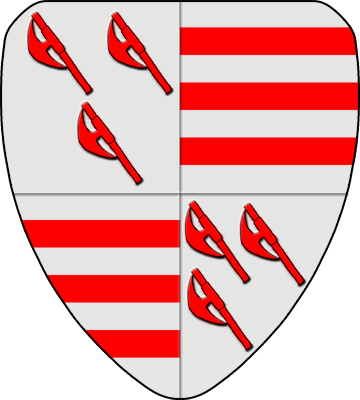
- Coat of arms

- Location of Ghlin in Mons
- Interactive map of Ghlin
- Location within Belgium Location within Hainaut (Belgium)
- Coordinates: 50°28′34″N 3°54′13″E
- Country: Belgium
- Community: French Community
- Region: Wallonia
- Province: Hainaut
- Arrondissement: Mons
- Municipality: Mons

Area
  - Total: 21.46 km^{2} (8.29 sq mi)

Population (2020-01-01)
  - Total: 8,458
  - Density: 394.1/km^{2} (1,021/sq mi)
- Postal codes: 7011
- Area codes: 065

Ghlin (French pronunciation: [ɡlɛ̃]; Walloon: Glin-dlé-Mont) is a sub-municipality of the city of Mons located in the province of Hainaut, Wallonia, Belgium. It was a separate municipality until 1972. On 1 January 1972, it was merged into Mons.

== People born in Ghlin ==
- Charles Plisnier (1896–1952), writer and winner of the Prix Goncourt in 1937

== See also ==
- Grand Large
