= List of protected heritage sites in Le Rœulx =

This table shows an overview of the protected heritage sites in the Walloon town Le Rœulx. This list is part of Belgium's national heritage.

Object	Year/architect	Town/section	Address	Coordinates	Number^{?}	Image
Castle of the Princes of Croÿ ^{(nl)} ^{(fr)}		Le Roeulx	place du château n°1	50.506076°N 4.109667°E	55035-CLT-0001-01 Info	Kasteel van de Prinsen van Croÿ
Hospice Saint-Jacques: the main building (walls and roofs), farm and field ^{(nl)} ^{(fr)}		Le Roeulx	faubourg de Binche n°1	50.499703°N 4.108839°E	55035-CLT-0003-01 Info	Hospice Saint-Jacques: het hoofdgebouw (gevels en daken), boerderij en domein
Chaplain's house (Maison du Chapelain): facades and roofs ^{(nl)} ^{(fr)}		Le Roeulx	place de la Chapelle n°7	50.503691°N 4.107627°E	55035-CLT-0004-01 Info	
St. Martin's Church: tower ^{(nl)} ^{(fr)}		Le Roeulx		50.528789°N 4.152664°E	55035-CLT-0005-01 Info	
Grand-Place square and house at n ° 35 ^{(nl)} ^{(fr)}		Le Roeulx		50.501850°N 4.108169°E	55035-CLT-0006-01 Info	Plein Grand-Place en huis bij n°35
house ^{(nl)} ^{(fr)}		Le Roeulx	Grand-Place n°35	50.501736°N 4.109098°E	55035-CLT-0007-01 Info	
The total orangery and the facades and roofs of the buildings of the Princes of Croÿ ^{(nl)} ^{(fr)}		Le Roeulx		50.505180°N 4.108682°E	55035-CLT-0008-01 Info	
Chapel Notre-Dame aux Tombeaux ^{(nl)} ^{(fr)}		Le Roeulx	rue des Fours à Chaux (M).	50.473260°N 4.075822°E	55035-CLT-0010-01 Info	Kapel Notre-Dame aux Tombeaux
Barges "Le Didier", "Wallon" and woods next to l'ASBL Compagnie du Canal du Centre ^{(nl)} ^{(fr)}		Le Roeulx		50.526266°N 4.108448°E	55035-CLT-0011-01 Info	
Hydraulic lifts 1, 2, 3 and 4 located on the Canal du Centre and the bridge located between Nos. 3 and 4 and the ensemble formed by these along with the canal's banks ^{(nl)} ^{(fr)}		Le Roeulx		50.487427°N 4.175825°E	55035-CLT-0012-01 Info	Hydraulische liften nrs. 1, 2, 3 en 4 gelegen op het Canal du Centre en de ophaalbrug gelegen tussen nrs. 3 en 4 en het ensemble gevormd door deze en de oeverbanken
The facades and roofs of the building where the engine is of the lifts No. 2 and 3 ^{(nl)} ^{(fr)}		Le Roeulx		50.481386°N 4.136043°E	55035-CLT-0014-01 Info	
Castle of the Princes of Croÿ ^{(nl)} ^{(fr)}		Le Roeulx		50.506076°N 4.109667°E	55035-PEX-0001-01 Info	Kasteel van de Prinsen van Croÿ
Hydraulic lifts 1, 2, 3 and 4 located on the Canal du Centre and the bridge located between Nos. 3 and 4 and the ensemble formed by these and the canal's banks ^{(nl)} ^{(fr)}		Le Roeulx		50.487427°N 4.175825°E	55035-PEX-0002-01 Info	Hydraulische liften nrs. 1, 2, 3 en 4 gelegen op het Canal du Centre en de ophaalbrug gelegen tussen nrs. 3 en 4 en het ensemble gevormd door deze en de oeverbanken
The facades and roofs of the building where the engine of the lifts No. 2 and 3 is ^{(nl)} ^{(fr)}		Le Roeulx		50.481386°N 4.136043°E	55035-PEX-0003-01 Info	

== See also ==
- List of protected heritage sites in Hainaut (province)
- Le Rœulx
