= Houdeng-Gœgnies =

Belgian village

Coordinates: 50°29′N 4°9′E

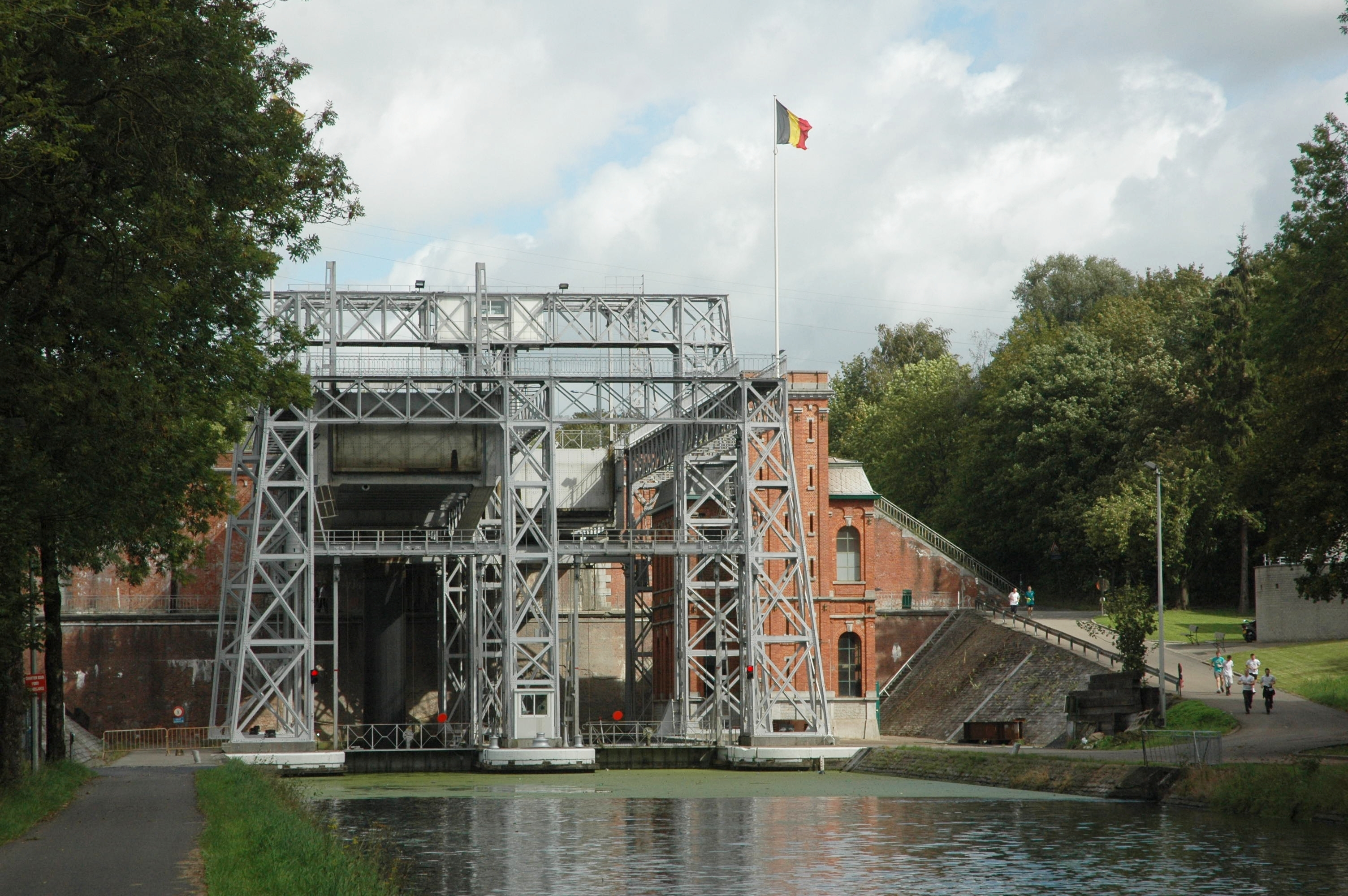
Lift 1 (at Houdeng-Gœgnies) on the old Canal du Centre - Belgium

Houdeng-Gœgnies (Walloon: Gôgnere) is a village of Wallonia and a district of the municipality of La Louvière, located in the province of Hainaut, Belgium.

At Houdeng, there is a 156-metre-tall radio tower, which is insulated against ground, as it was built as antenna for a mediumwave transmitter working on 1125 kHz with 20 kW.
