= Maurice Dease =

Recipient of the Victoria Cross

Lieutenant Maurice Dease VC
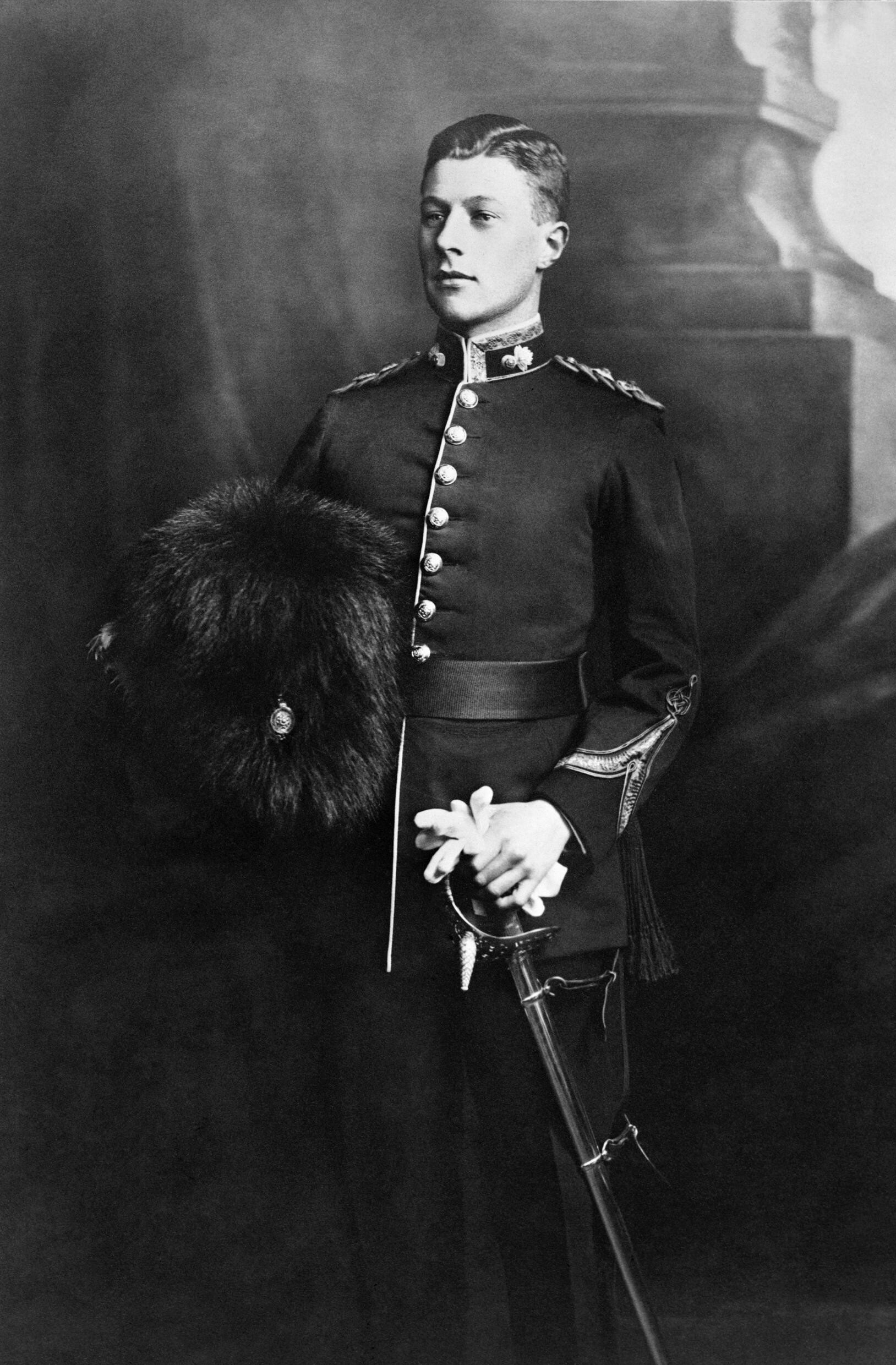
- Born: 28 September 1889; Coole, County Westmeath, Ireland
- Died: 23 August 1914 (aged 24); Nimy, Belgium
- Burial place: St Symphorien Military Cemetery, Belgium
- Military career
- Allegiance: United Kingdom
- Branch: British Army
- Service years: 1910 – 1914
- Rank: Lieutenant
- Units: The Royal Fusiliers
- Conflicts: World War I: Battle of Mons †
- Awards: Victoria Cross

Maurice James Dease VC (28 September 1889 – 23 August 1914) was an Irish recipient of the Victoria Cross, the highest and most prestigious award for gallantry in the face of the enemy that can be awarded to British and Commonwealth forces. He was one of the first British officer battle casualties of the war and the first officer to posthumously receive the Victoria Cross.

== Military career ==
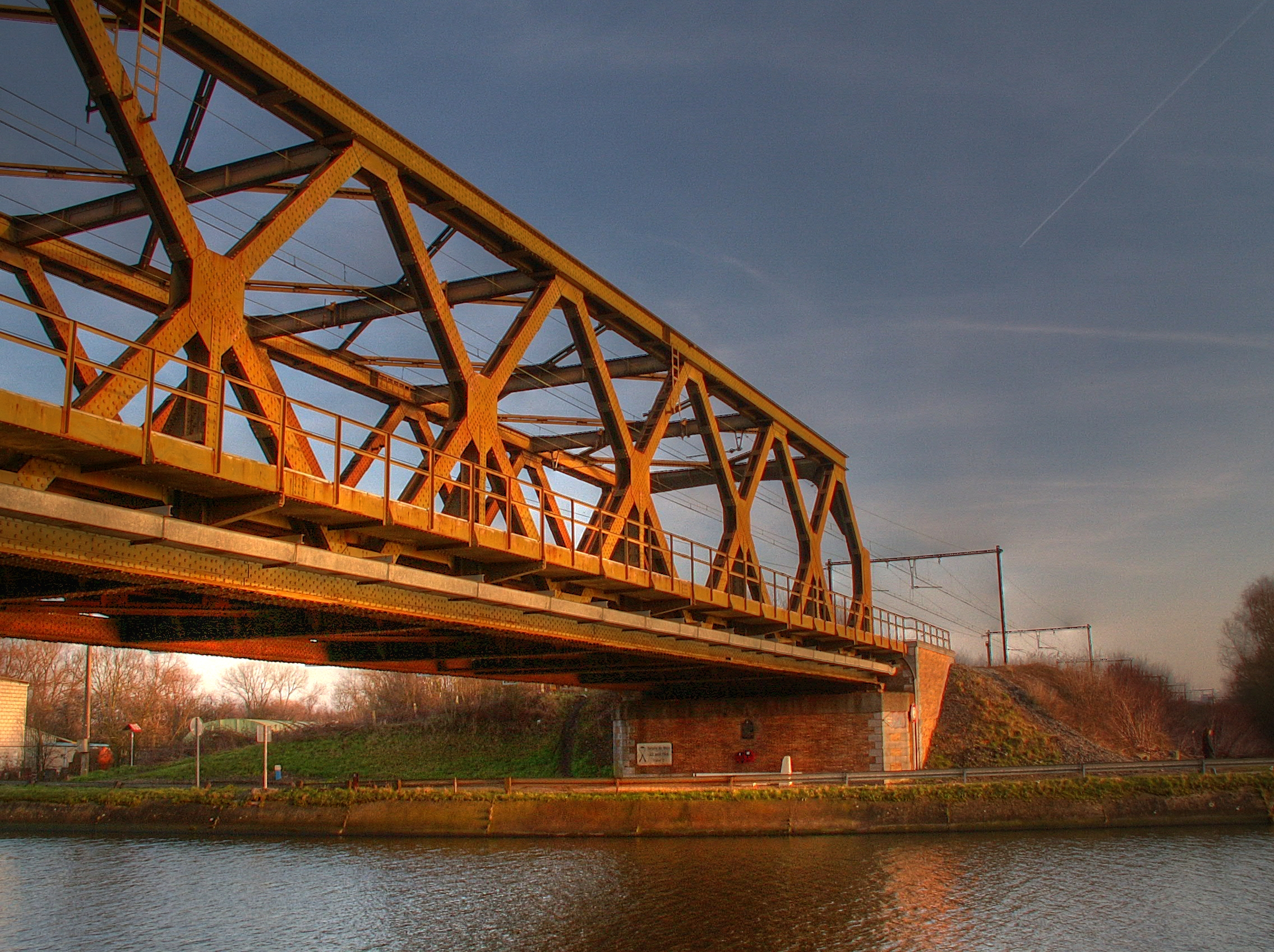
Nimy railway bridge; the memorial plaque can be seen on the face of the abutment

Dease was born on 28 September 1889 in Gaulstown, Coole, County Westmeath, Ireland to Edmund Fitzlaurence Dease and Katherine Dease (née Murray). He was educated at Stonyhurst College and the Army Department of Wimbledon College before attending the Royal Military College, Sandhurst, from where he graduated as a second lieutenant in the Royal Fusiliers on 20 April 1910.

He was 24 years old, and a lieutenant in the 4th Battalion, Royal Fusiliers, commanded at the time by Lieutenant Colonel Norman McMahon, and was awarded the VC for his actions on 23 August 1914, at Mons, Belgium.

Nimy Bridge was being defended by a single company of the 4th Royal Fusiliers and a machine-gun section with Dease in command. The gun fire was intense, and the casualties very heavy, but the lieutenant went on firing in spite of his wounds, until he was hit for the fifth time and was carried away.

Though two or three times badly wounded he continued to control the fire of his machine guns at Mons on 23rd Aug., until all his men were shot. He died of his wounds.

— London Gazette, 16 November 1914

Dease was awarded the first Victoria Cross in the Great War and he received it on the first day of the first significant British encounter in that war.

When Lieutenant Dease had been mortally wounded, Private Sidney Godley offered to defend the Railway Bridge while the rest of the section retreated and was also awarded the VC. He was taken prisoner of war.

H. C. O'Neill wrote this account in The Royal Fusiliers in the Great War.

"The machine gun crews were constantly being knocked out. So cramped was their position that when a man was hit he had to be removed before another could take his place. The approach from the trench was across the open, and whenever a gun stopped Lieutenant Maurice Dease... went up to see what was wrong. To do this once called for no ordinary courage. To repeat it several times could only be done with real heroism. Dease was badly wounded on these journeys, but insisted on remaining at duty as long as one of his crew could fire. The third wound proved fatal, and a well deserved VC was awarded him posthumously. By this time both guns had ceased firing, and all the crew had been knocked out. In response to an inquiry whether anyone else knew how to operate the guns Private Godley came forward. He cleared the emplacement under heavy fire and brought the gun into action. But he had not been firing long before the gun was hit and put completely out of action. The water jackets of both guns were riddled with bullets, so that they were no longer of any use. Godley himself was badly wounded and later fell into the hands of the Germans.

Dease is buried at St Symphorien Military Cemetery, 2 kilometres east of Mons, in Belgium. He is remembered with a plaque under the Nimy Railway Bridge, Mons and in Westminster Cathedral. His name is also commemorated on the Wayside Cross at the Catholic priory in Woodchester, near Stroud, Gloucestershire, where his aunt, Lady Mostyn, was a parishioner. He is further commemorated on a cross at Exton, Rutland and on a plaque installed in St Martin's Church, Culmullen, County Meath, Ireland. His Victoria Cross is displayed at the Royal Fusiliers Museum in the Tower of London. Victoria Cross holders are being honoured with commemorative paving stones; Dease's was the first to be unveiled on 23 August 2014 at Glasnevin Cemetery, Dublin.

He was portrayed in the BBC Three series Our World War (2014) by Dominic Thorburn.

== Sources ==
- The Register of the Victoria Cross (1981, 1988 and 1997)
- Clarke, Brian D. H. (1986). "A register of awards to Irish-born officers and men". The Irish Sword. XVI (64): 185–287.
- Ireland's VCs (Dept of Economic Development, 1995)
- Monuments to Courage (David Harvey, 1999)
- Ryan, Mark (2014). The First VCs: The Moving True Story of First World War Heroes Maurice Dease and Sidney Godley. The History Press. ISBN 978-0750954518.
- Irish Winners of the Victoria Cross (Richard Doherty & David Truesdale, 2000)
- "Elegant Extracts", the Royal Fusiliers Recipients of the VC (J. P. Kelleher, 2001)
- Royal Fusiliers Recipients of the Victoria Cross
