= Charles Plisnier =

Belgian writer

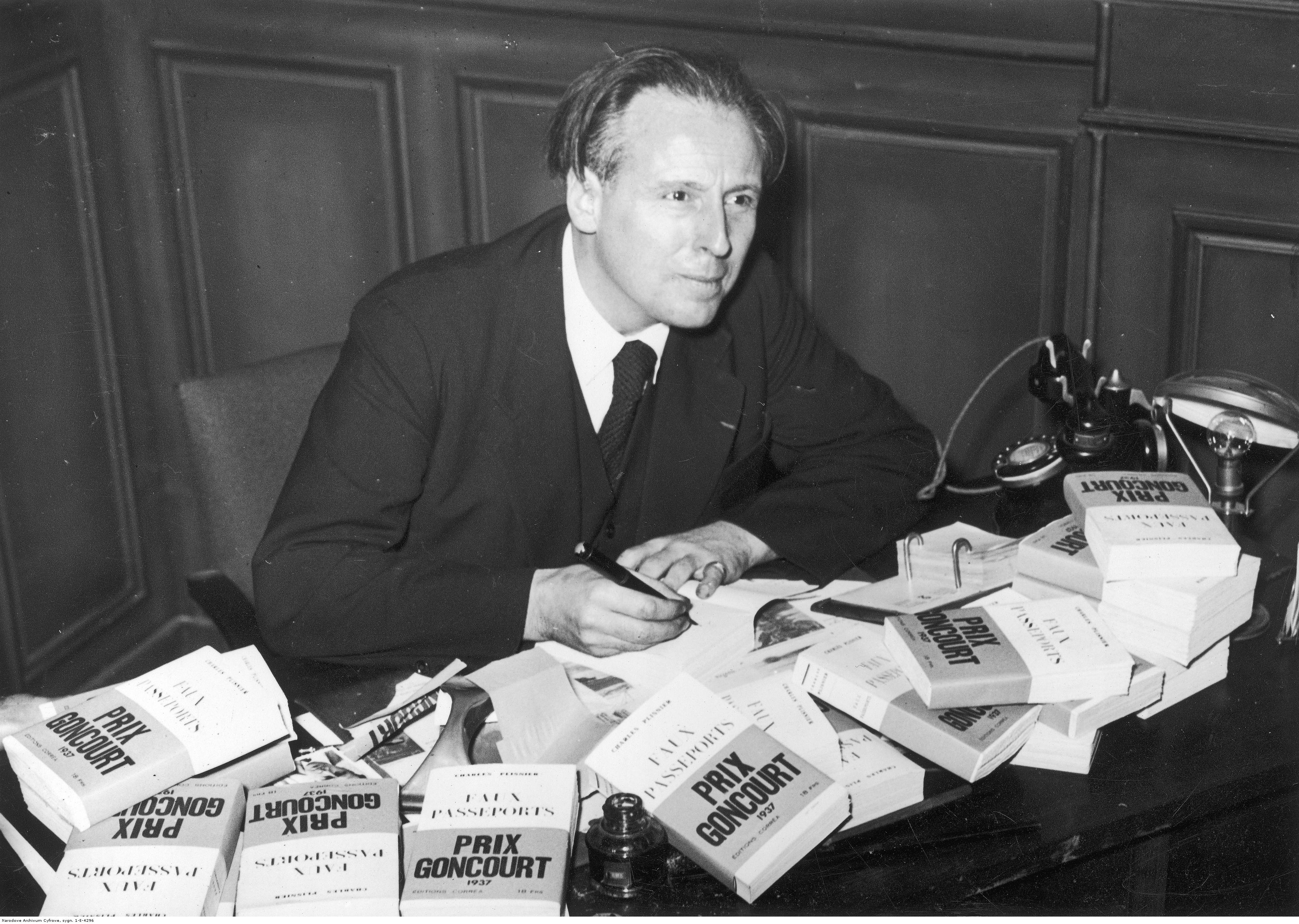
- Charles Plisnier signing copies of Faux passeports after receiving the Prix Goncourt, 1937
- Born: 13 December 1896; Ghlin, Hainaut, Belgium
- Died: 17 July 1952 (aged 55); Brussels, Belgium
- Education: Free University of Brussels
- Occupations: Writer, lawyer
- Writing career
- Language: French
- Period: 1913–1952
- Notable awards: Prix Goncourt (1937)

Charles Plisnier (13 December 1896 – 17 July 1952) was a Belgian writer from Wallonia.

== Biography ==
Training as a lawyer at the Free University of Brussels from 1919, Plisnier became a Doctor of Law at the court of appeal of Brussels in 1922. In his youth, he was a member of the Communist Party of Belgium, and worked for the International Red Aid. After visiting the Soviet Union in 1928, he was disillusioned with the country and started sympathizing with the Trotskyist movement, which led to his exclusion from the Communist Party. He later disavowed communism and became a Roman Catholic, but nevertheless remained a Marxist. Plisnier appeared as a heretic to the majority of his contemporaries, as the existence of God never ceased to be an active question for him; throughout his life, he experienced periods of profound atheism and of mystical crisis.

Turning to literature, Plisnier became notable as a writer of family sagas tinged with a critique of bourgeois society. Mariages (1936; in English as Nothing to Chance, 1938) deals with the limitations of social conventions; the five-volume Meurtres (1939–41; "Murders") centres on an idealistic tragic hero, Noël Annequin, in his fight against hypocrisy. A recurring theme in his works is the moral and psychological study of individuals in crisis, such as in L'Enfant aux stigmates (1931; "The Child With Stigmata"), which recalls the fatalism of Maurice Maeterlinck.

Plisnier also wrote poetry: his early poetical works, such as Prière aux mains coupées (1930; "Prayer with Severed Hands"), deal with his struggle to reconcile religion and politics, while Fertilité du désert (1933; ”Fertility of the Desert”) shows an influence of surrealism. His later works of poetry, such as Odes pour retrouver les hommes (1935; "Odes to Meet Again With Men"), Sacré (1938; "Holy", "Sacred") and Ave Genitrix (1943; "Hail Mother"), are more conventional in form and mark a movement back to Christianity.

In 1937, Plisnier won the Prix Goncourt for Faux passeports ("False Passports"; in English as Memoirs of a Secret Revolutionary, 1938), a collection of short stories denouncing Stalinism, in the same spirit as Arthur Koestler. He was the first foreigner to receive Prix Goncourt. He was also an activist of the Walloon movement; at the Walloon National Congress held in Liège in 1945, he gave fiery speeches and called for the unification of Wallonia with France.
