= Lisryan =

Village in County Longford, Ireland

Lisryan Lios Riain
- Village
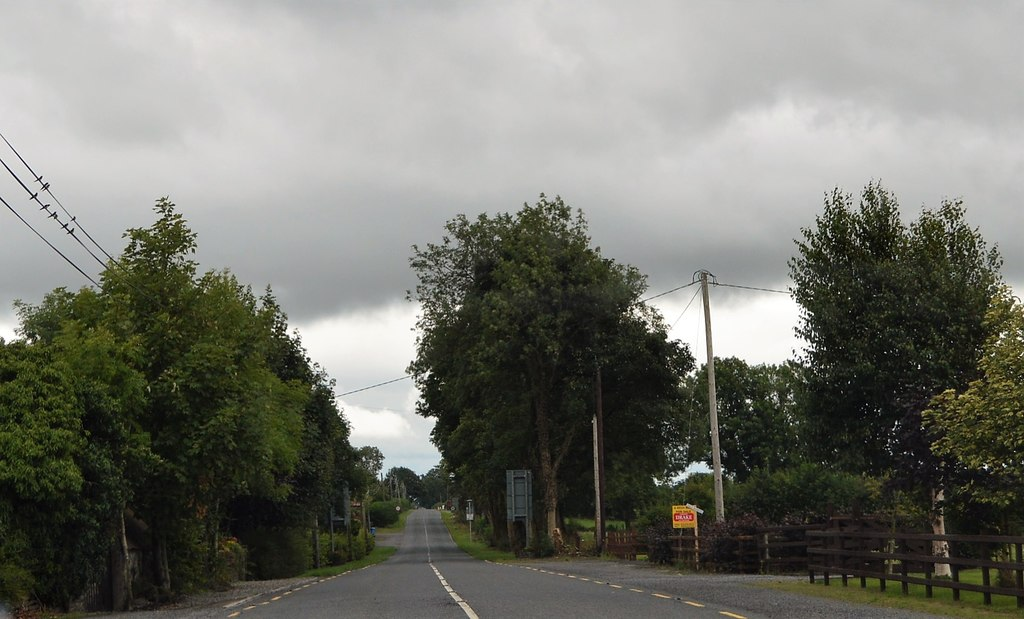
- The R395 regional road at Lisryan

- Location in Ireland
- Coordinates: 53°43′41″N 7°30′12″W
- Country: Ireland
- Province: Leinster
- County: County Longford
- Time zone: UTC+0 (WET)
  - Summer (DST): UTC-1 (IST (WEST))
- Irish Grid Reference: N326755

Lisryan (Irish: Lios Riain, meaning 'Rian's ringfort') is a village in County Longford, Ireland.

== Transport ==
Lisryan is located on the Regional Road the R395 road. The nearest towns are Granard and Edgeworthstown. Granard (5 km to the north) is served by the Bus Éireann number 111 bus service. Edgeworthstown (8 km to the south-west) is served by the Iarnród Éireann Sligo to Dublin train service.

== Coolamber Manor ==
Cloonshanagh or Coolamber Manor Demesne (in Irish: Cluain Seanach meaning "lawn or meadow of the foxes". Or Cul Amra meaning "hill-back of the trough") is a large country house on a site of approximately 150 acres. It is located just outside the village of Lisryan. It was a drug rehabilitation centre, however its doors are now closed.

== See also ==
- List of towns and villages in Ireland
