= Drumcree, County Westmeath =

Drumcree Droim Cria
- Village
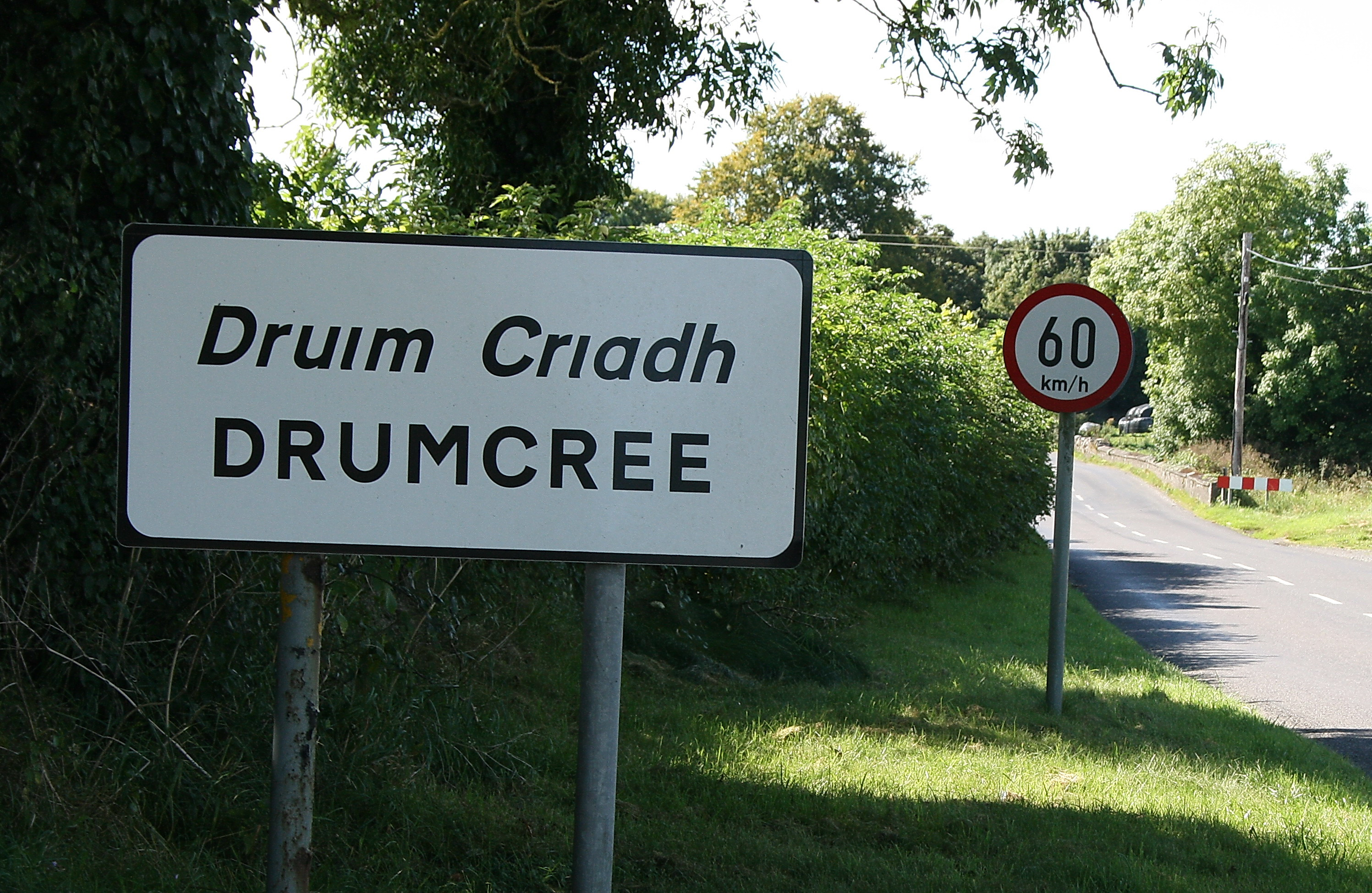
- Entering Drumcree, facing west towards Granard

- Location in Ireland
- Coordinates: 53°38′10″N 7°09′52″W
- Country: Ireland
- Province: Leinster
- County: County Westmeath
- Time zone: UTC+0 (WET)
  - Summer (DST): UTC-1 (IST (WEST))

Drumcree (Irish: Droim Cria or Druim Criadh) is a small village in County Westmeath in Ireland on the R395 regional road. This village is part of St Mary's Parish, Collinstown, and a sister parish of St Feichin's, Fore.

The village is situated upon a crossroads, fringes parts of the Barbavilla Bog, the Glackstown Bog, and Mullacruaigh bog, all of which have been harvested for winter fuel for generations by the neighbouring communities.
