= R395 road (Ireland) =

Road in Ireland

R395 road
- Bóthar R395

Route information
- Length: 40 km (25 mi)

Location
- Country: Ireland
- Primary destinations: County Longford; Edgeworthstown – leaves the N55; Lisryan; County Westmeath; Lismacaffry; R396; Coole; Castlepollard – R195, R394; Crosses the Yellow River; Collinstown; Drumcree; Delvin – terminates in town centre at junction with the N51 and N52

Highway system
- Roads in Ireland; Motorways; Primary; Secondary; Regional

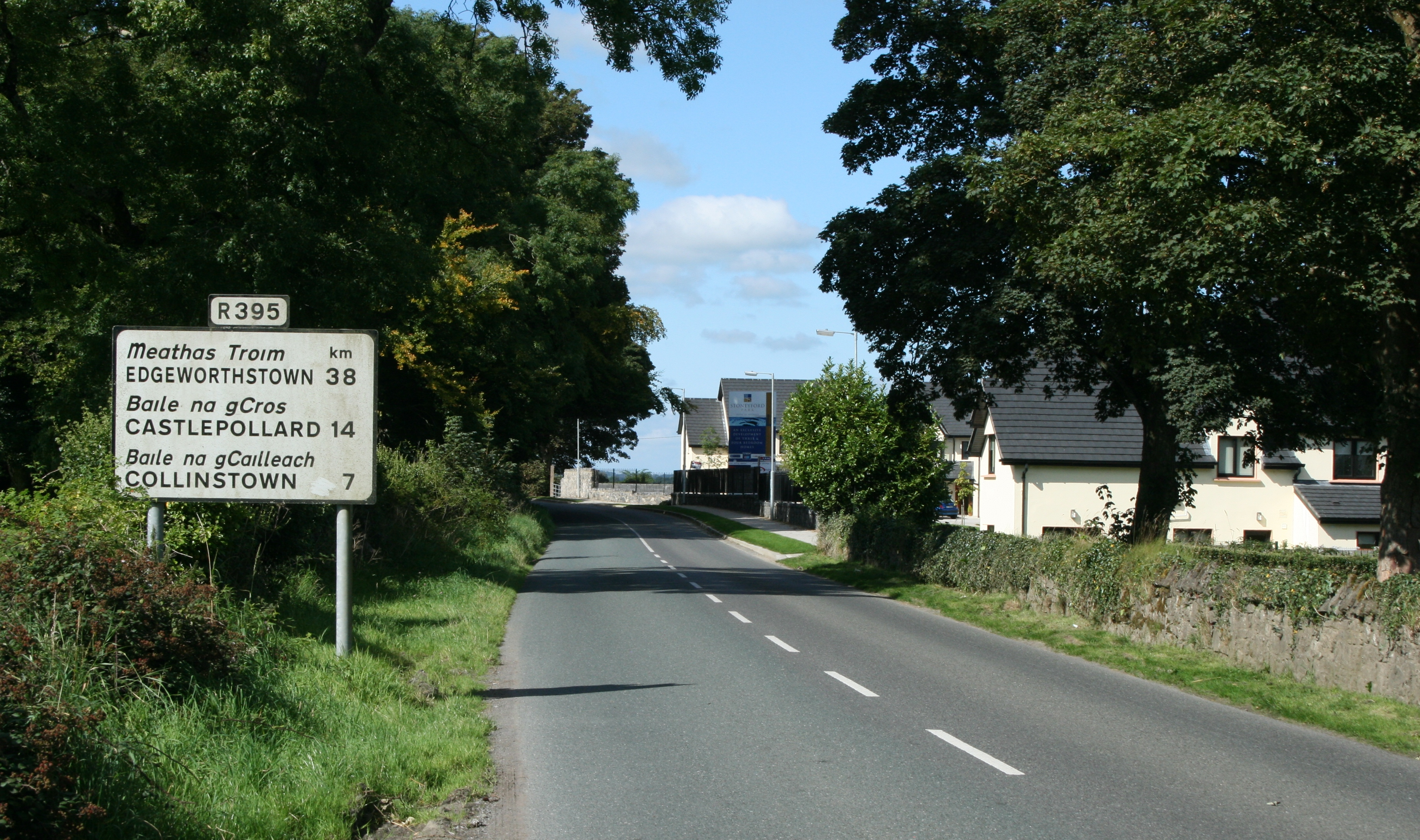
R395 leaving Delvin Clickable image

The R395 road is a regional road in Ireland linking Edgeworthstown in County Longford to Delvin in County Westmeath. It passes through the town of Castlepollard and several villages and hamlets en route.

The road is 40 km (25 mi) long.

== See also ==
- Roads in Ireland
- National primary road
- National secondary road
