= Thieu =

Thieu Tî (Walloon)
- district
- Interactive map of Thieu
- Coordinates: 50°28′29″N 4°05′45″E
- Country: Belgium
- Region: Wallonia
- Province: Hainaut
- Municipality: Le Rœulx
- Source: NIS
- Postal code: 7070
- Area code: 064

Thieu (French pronunciation: [tjø]; Walloon: Tî) is a village of Wallonia and a district of the municipality of Le Rœulx, located in the province of Hainaut, Belgium. In 1984, the Living Museum of the Canal du Centre in Thieu was awarded the Council of Europe Museum Prize.

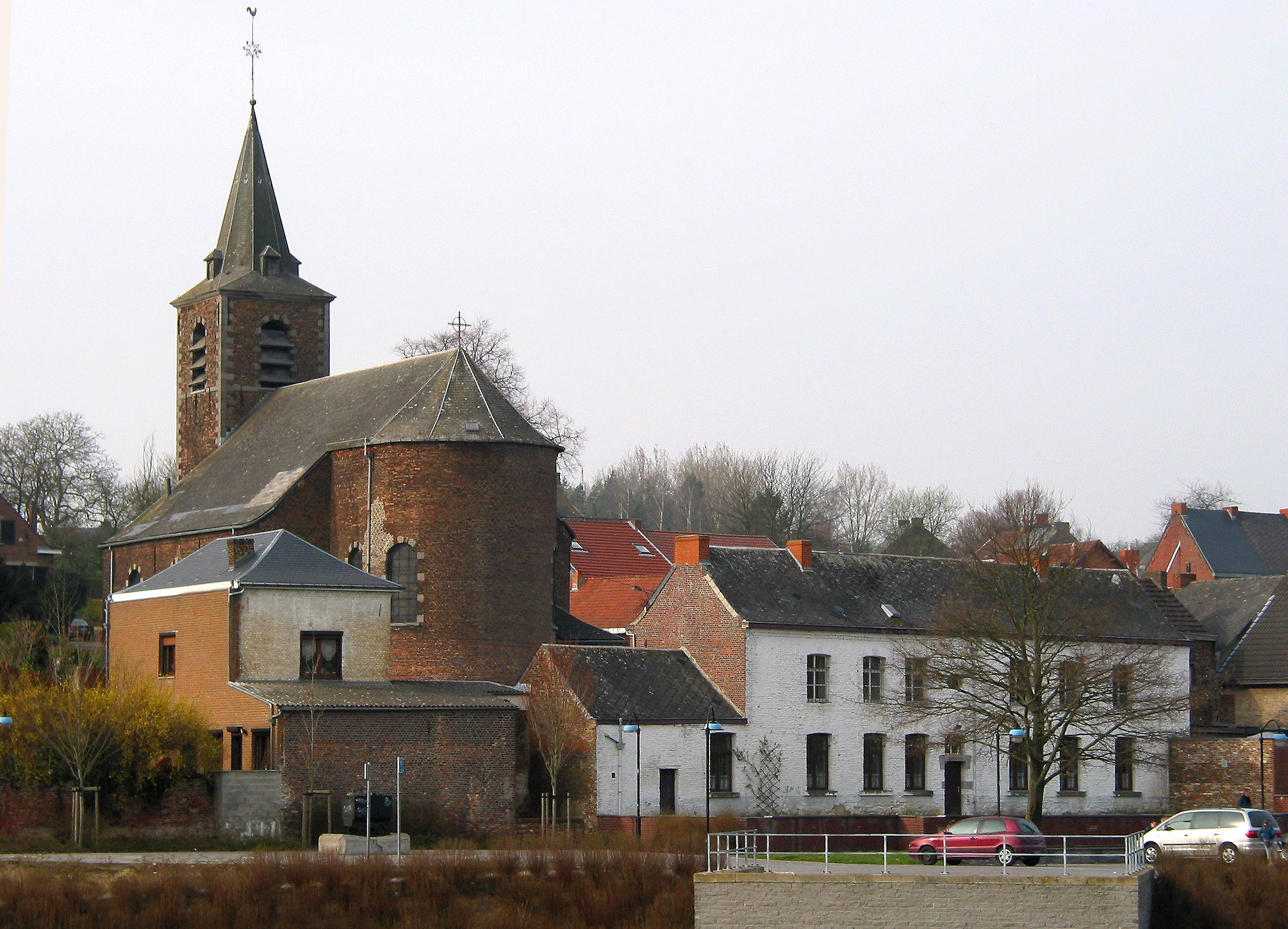
The St. Gaugericus' church
