= Grand Large =

Artificial lake in Belgium

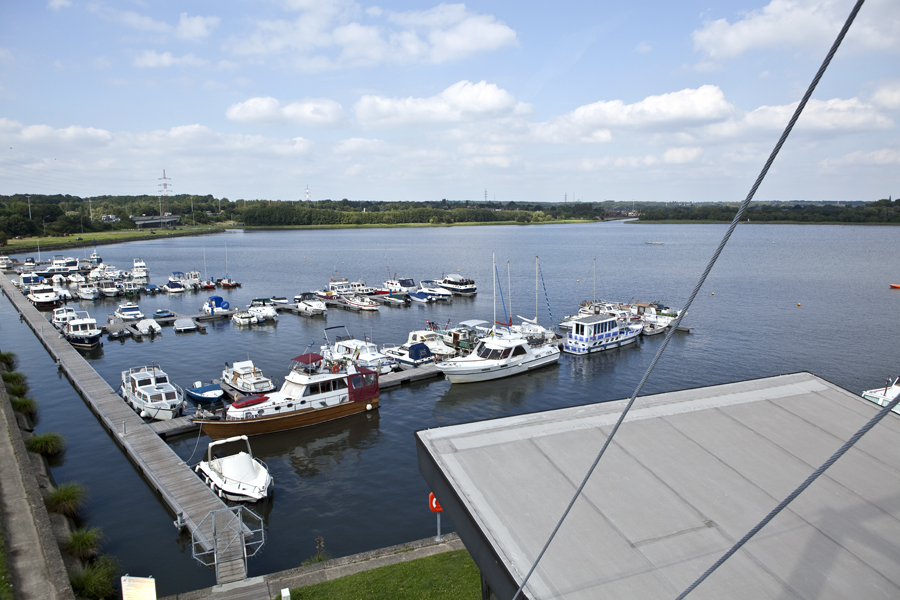

- Location within Belgium
- Coordinates: 50°28′17″N 03°56′10″E
- Type: artificial lake
- Basin countries: Wallonia, Belgium
- Max. length: 1 km (0.62 mi)
- Max. width: 1 km (0.62 mi)
- Surface area: 0.4 km^{2} (0.15 sq mi)
- Surface elevation: 30 m (98 ft)
- Islands: 0
- Settlements: Mons

The Grand Large (also known as the Grand Large de Pommeroeul) is an artificial lake in Wallonia, not far from the city of Mons in the province of Hainaut, Belgium. The lake is situated along the highway E19 between Paris and Brussels. Its marina can host 157 boats. The lake is linked to two canals: to the east, the Nimy-Blaton-Péronnes Canal, to the west the Canal du Centre.
