= Le Rœulx =

Municipality in Hainaut Province, Wallonia, Belgium

Le Rœulx: El Rû (Walloon)
- Municipality
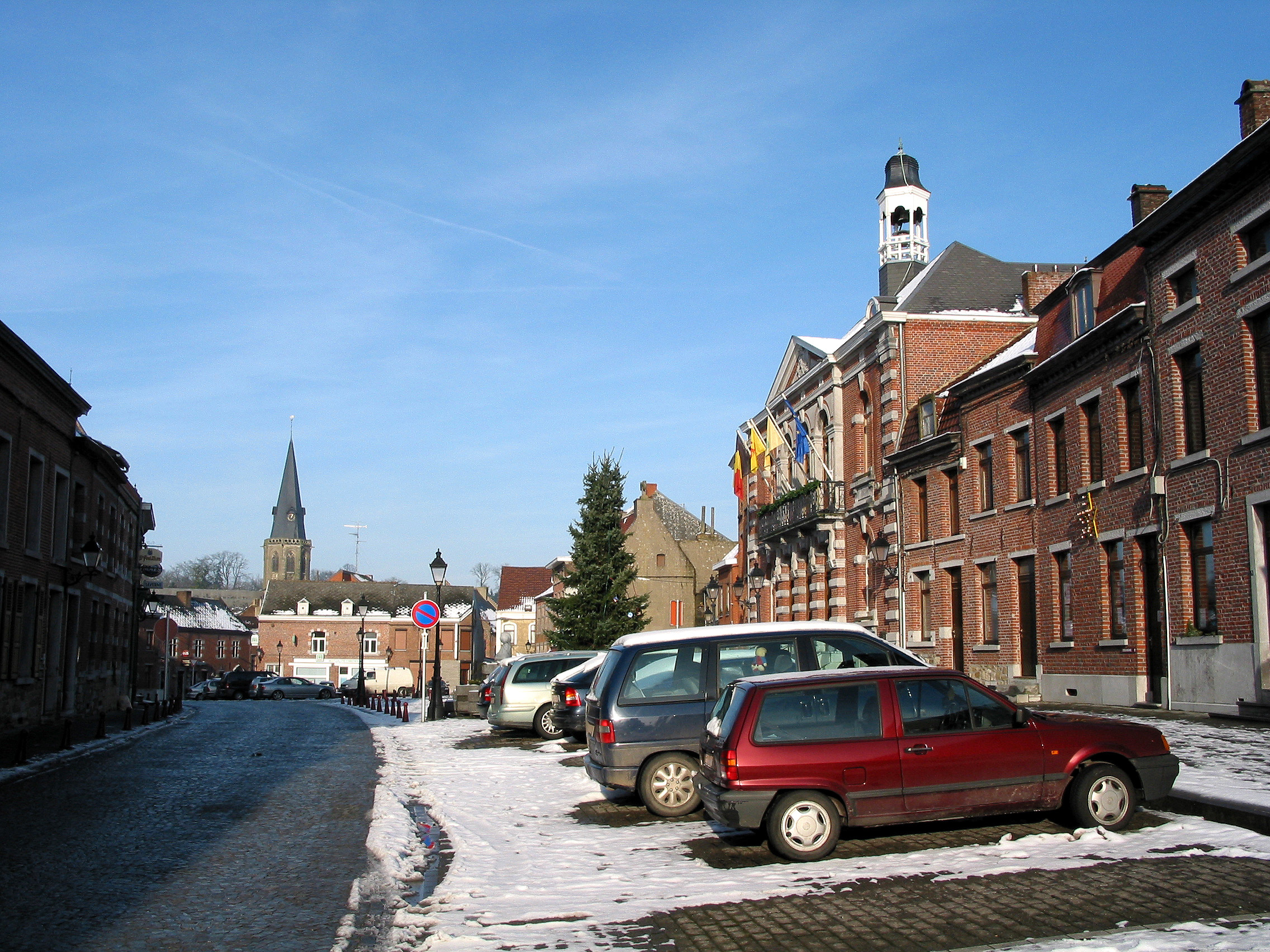

- Flag Coat of arms

- Location of Le Rœulx in Hainaut
- Interactive map of Le Rœulx
- Location in Belgium
- Coordinates: 50°30′N 04°06′E
- Country: Belgium
- Community: French Community
- Region: Wallonia
- Province: Hainaut
- Arrondissement: Soignies

Government
  - Mayor: Benoît Friart
  - Governing party: IC

Area
  - Total: 43.41 km^{2} (16.76 sq mi)

Population (2018-01-01)
  - Total: 8,617
  - Density: 198.5/km^{2} (514.1/sq mi)
- Postal codes: 7070
- NIS code: 55035
- Area codes: 064
- Website: www.leroeulx.be

Le Rœulx (French pronunciation: [lə ʁø]; Walloon: El Rû) is a city and municipality of Wallonia located in the province of Hainaut, Belgium.

On January 1, 2006, Le Rœulx had a total population of 7,977. The total area is 42.80 km^{2} which gives a population density of 186 inhabitants per km^{2}.

The municipality consists of the following districts: Gottignies, Le Rœulx, Mignault, Thieu, and Ville-sur-Haine.

The Château du Rœulx, a family seat of the Princes de Croÿ-Rœulx, is situated near the town.

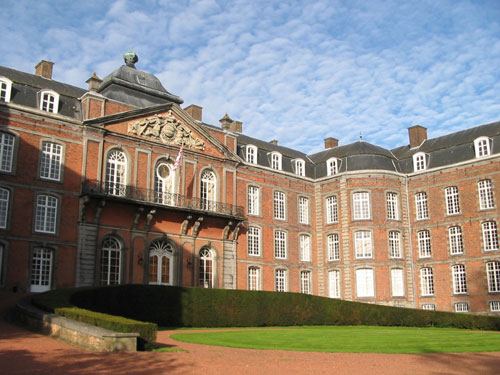
Castle of Le Rœulx
