= Coole, County Westmeath =

Coole An Chúil
- Village
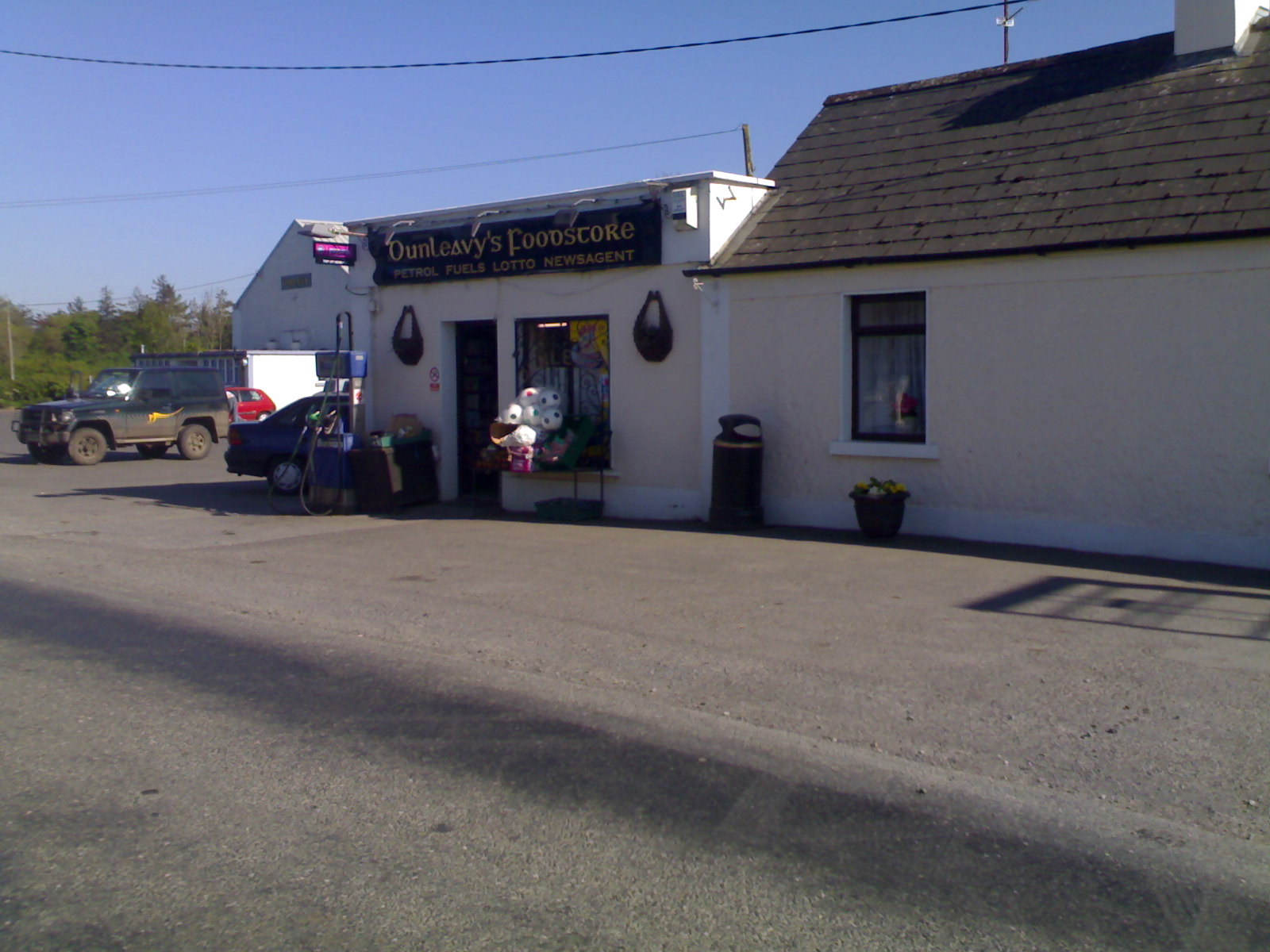
- Grocery shop in Coole

- Location in Ireland
- Coordinates: 53°42′00″N 7°22′12″W
- Country: Ireland
- Province: Leinster
- County: County Westmeath

Government
  - Dáil Éireann: Longford–Westmeath
- Time zone: UTC+0 (WET)
  - Summer (DST): UTC-1 (IST (WEST))
- Irish Grid Reference: N408724

Coole (Irish: An Chúil, meaning 'the corner') is a village in County Westmeath, Ireland, on the R395 regional road. It is situated on a plateau that overlooks the part of the Bog of Allen, cultivated for peat for fuel consumption purposes by Bórd na Móna, the government-owned peat production industry and for garden plant soil compost products by Harte Peat Ltd., a private enterprise, and Bórd na Móna.

The village is stretched over a series of junctions and cross-roads. These regional and communal roads connect to Castlepollard to the east, Coolure, near Lough Derravaragh to the south, and Abbeylara to the north-west in neighbouring County Longford. Another communal road accesses and crosses the low-lying bog-land, permitting machinery access to the area.

The village consists of a pub, a post office, a shop, a church, and a medical centre. There is also a primary school and a parish community hall.

Coole is the birthplace of Lt. Maurice James Dease VC, the first posthumous recipient of the Victoria Cross in the Great War at the Battle of Mons.
