= Nimy =

Sub-municipality of the city of Mons, Belgium

Nimy Nîmi (Walloon)
- Sub-municipality of Mons
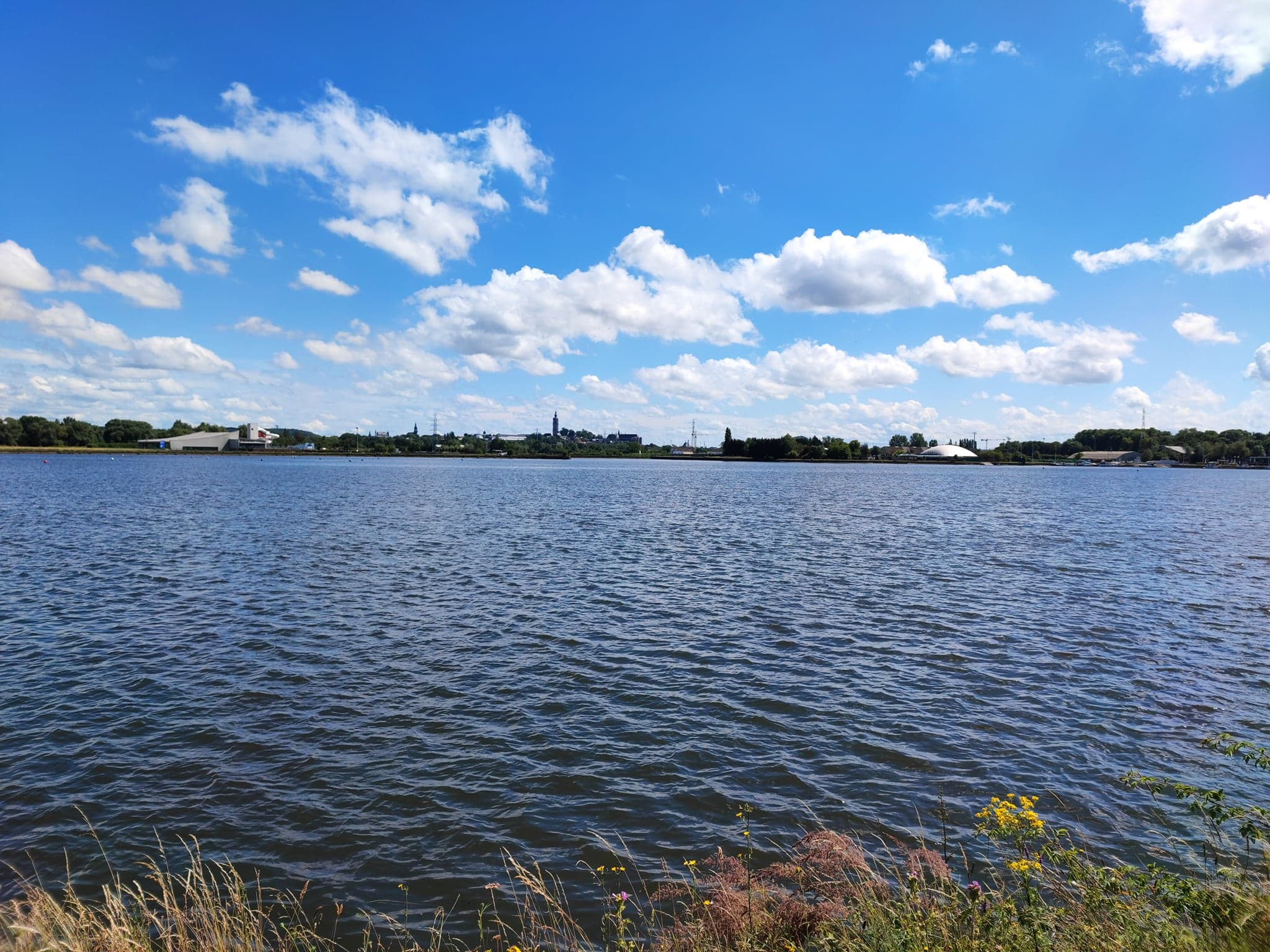
- Grand Large

- Coat of arms

- Location of Nimy in Mons
- Interactive map of Nimy
- Location within Belgium Location within Hainaut (Belgium)
- Coordinates: 50°28′33″N 3°57′17″E
- Country: Belgium
- Community: French Community
- Region: Wallonia
- Province: Hainaut
- Arrondissement: Mons
- Municipality: Mons

Area
  - Total: 4.16 km^{2} (1.61 sq mi)

Population (2020-01-01)
  - Total: 4,751
  - Density: 1,140/km^{2} (2,960/sq mi)
- Postal codes: 7020
- Area codes: 065

Nimy (French pronunciation: [nimi]; Walloon: Nîmi) is a sub-municipality of the city of Mons located in the province of Hainaut, Wallonia, Belgium. It was a separate municipality until 1972. On 1 January 1972, it was merged into Mons.

== History ==
In 1914, it was the scene of heavy fighting during the Battle of Mons, the first action of the British Expeditionary Force in World War I. Notable for its earthenware pottery.

== Gallery ==
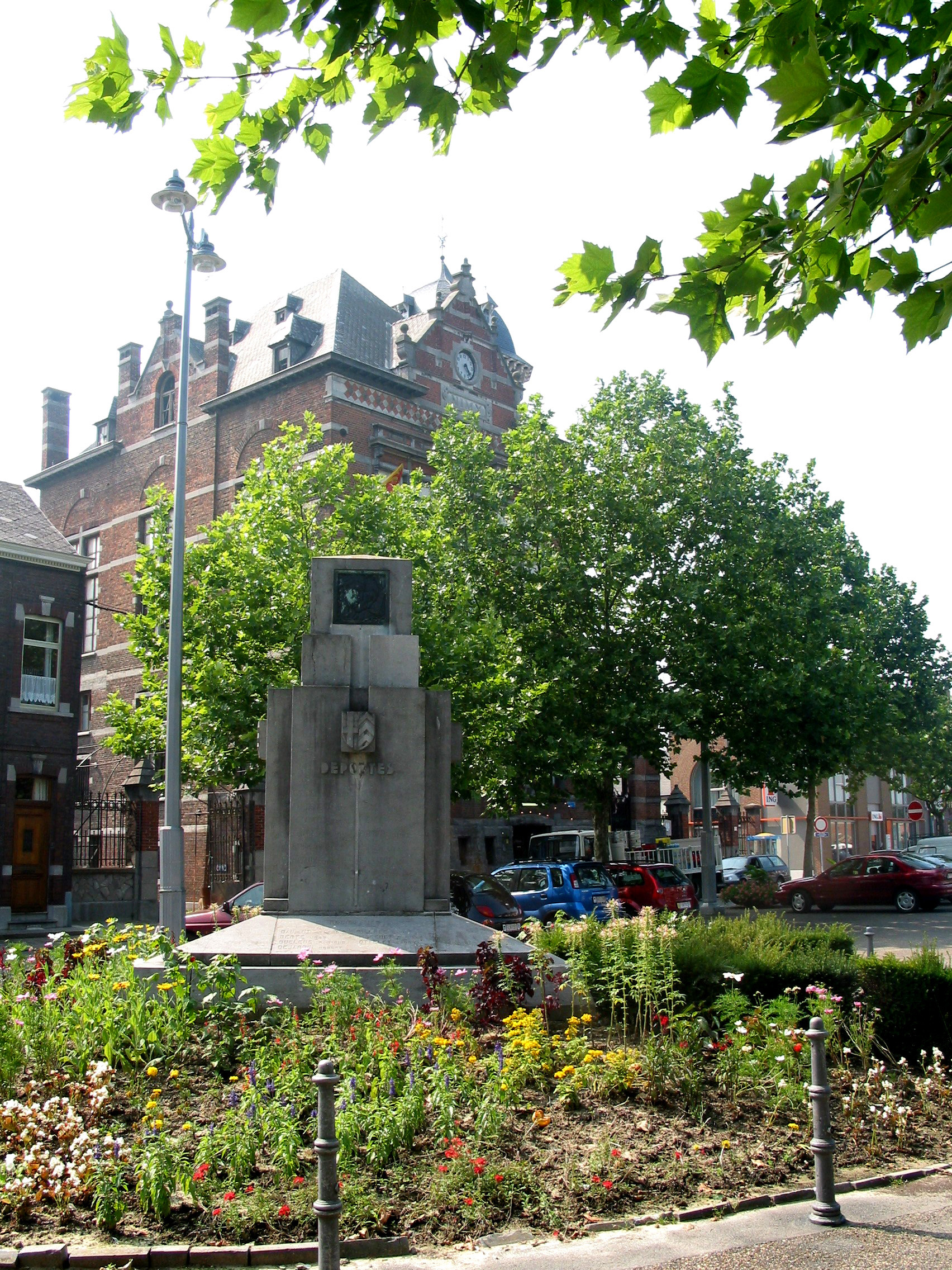
Old Town Hall.

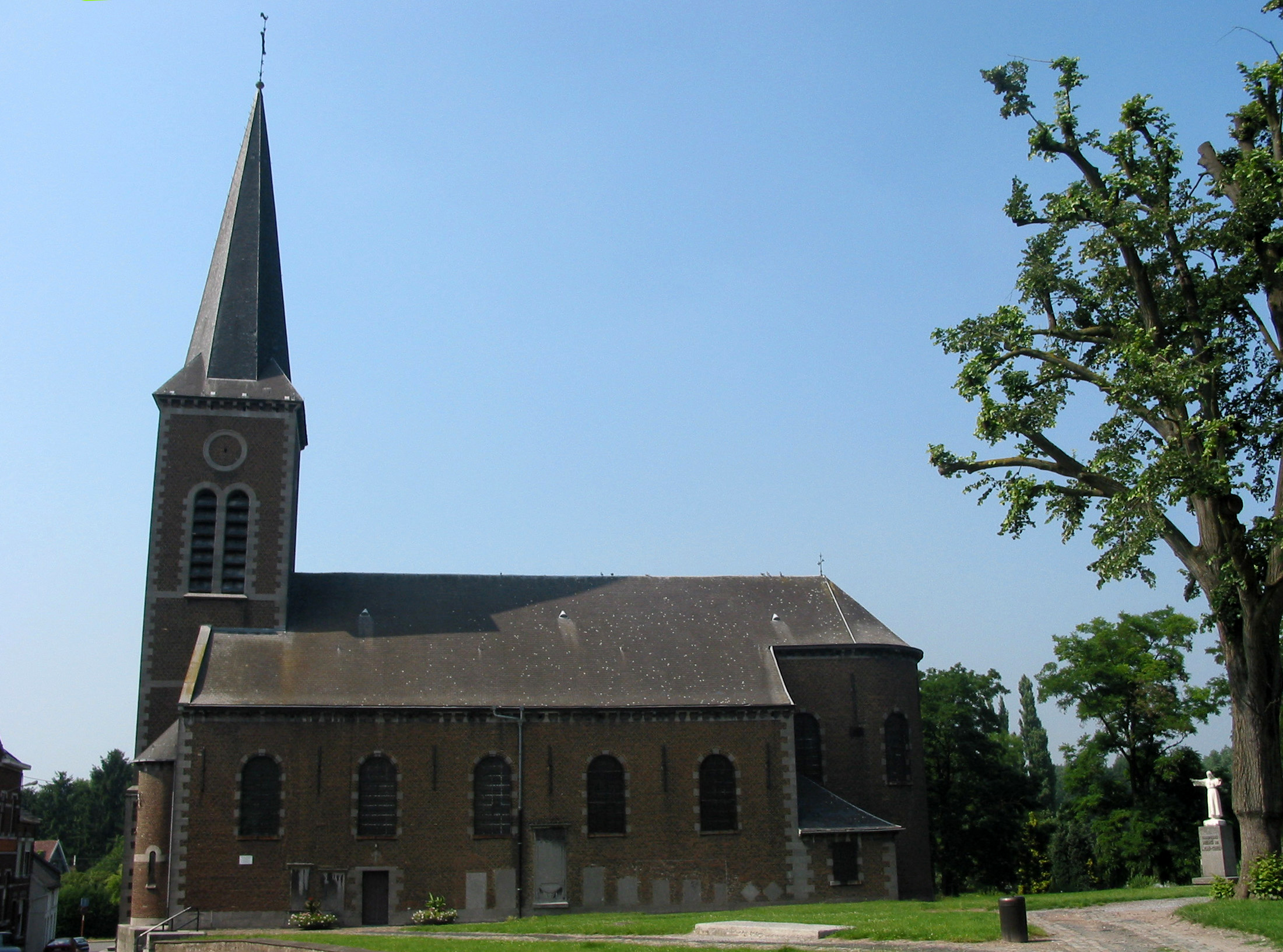
St. Mary Church.
