= Andreyevka =

Andreyevka (Russian: Андре́евка) is the name of several inhabited localities in Russia.

== Altai Krai ==
As of 2010, two rural localities in Altai Krai bear this name:

- Andreyevka, Shipunovsky District, Altai Krai, a settlement in Zerkalsky Selsoviet of Shipunovsky District
- Andreyevka, Slavgorodsky District, Altai Krai, a selo in Maksimovsky Selsoviet of Slavgorodsky District

== Amur Oblast ==
As of 2010, one rural locality in Amur Oblast bears this name:

- Andreyevka, Amur Oblast, a selo in Andreyevsky Rural Settlement of Ivanovsky District

== Republic of Bashkortostan ==
As of 2010, ten rural localities in the Republic of Bashkortostan bear this name:

- Andreyevka, Arkhangelsky District, Republic of Bashkortostan, a village in Orlovsky Selsoviet of Arkhangelsky District
- Andreyevka, Aurgazinsky District, Republic of Bashkortostan, a selo in Tukayevsky Selsoviet of Aurgazinsky District
- Andreyevka, Birsky District, Republic of Bashkortostan, a village in Kusekeyevsky Selsoviet of Birsky District
- Andreyevka, Blagoveshchensky District, Republic of Bashkortostan, a village in Nikolayevsky Selsoviet of Blagoveshchensky District
- Andreyevka, Ilishevsky District, Republic of Bashkortostan, a selo in Andreyevsky Selsoviet of Ilishevsky District
- Andreyevka, Kugarchinsky District, Republic of Bashkortostan, a village in Zarechensky Selsoviet of Kugarchinsky District
- Andreyevka, Mishkinsky District, Republic of Bashkortostan, a village in Kayrakovsky Selsoviet of Mishkinsky District
- Andreyevka, Miyakinsky District, Republic of Bashkortostan, a village in Novokaramalinsky Selsoviet of Miyakinsky District
- Andreyevka, Pervomaysky Selsoviet, Yanaulsky District, Republic of Bashkortostan, a village in Pervomaysky Selsoviet of Yanaulsky District
- Andreyevka, Yamandinsky Selsoviet, Yanaulsky District, Republic of Bashkortostan, a selo in Yamadinsky Selsoviet of Yanaulsky District

== Belgorod Oblast ==
As of 2010, three rural localities in Belgorod Oblast bear this name:

- Andreyevka, Chernyansky District, Belgorod Oblast, a selo in Chernyansky District
- Andreyevka (Kholodnyanskoye Rural Settlement), Prokhorovsky District, Belgorod Oblast, a selo in Prokhorovsky District; municipally, a part of Kholodnyanskoye Rural Settlement of that district
- Andreyevka (Prelestnenskoye Rural Settlement), Prokhorovsky District, Belgorod Oblast, a selo in Prokhorovsky District; municipally, a part of Prelestnenskoye Rural Settlement of that district

== Bryansk Oblast ==
As of 2010, two rural localities in Bryansk Oblast bear this name:

- Andreyevka, Navlinsky District, Bryansk Oblast, a village in Klyukovensky Selsoviet of Navlinsky District
- Andreyevka, Surazhsky District, Bryansk Oblast, a village in Andreyevsky Selsoviet of Surazhsky District

== Chelyabinsk Oblast ==
As of 2010, one rural locality in Chelyabinsk Oblast bears this name:

- Andreyevka, Chelyabinsk Oblast, a village in Petrovsky Selsoviet of Uvelsky District

== Chuvash Republic ==
As of 2010, two rural localities in the Chuvash Republic bear this name:

- Andreyevka, Ibresinsky District, Chuvash Republic, a village in Andreyevskoye Rural Settlement of Ibresinsky District
- Andreyevka, Shemurshinsky District, Chuvash Republic, a village in Shemurshinskoye Rural Settlement of Shemurshinsky District

== Republic of Dagestan ==
As of 2010, one rural locality in the Republic of Dagestan bears this name:

- Andreyevka, Republic of Dagestan, a selo in Pervomaysky Selsoviet of Derbentsky District

== Irkutsk Oblast ==
As of 2010, one rural locality in Irkutsk Oblast bears this name:

- Andreyevka, Irkutsk Oblast, a village in Tulunsky District

== Ivanovo Oblast ==
As of 2010, one rural locality in Ivanovo Oblast bears this name:

- Andreyevka, Ivanovo Oblast, a village in Lezhnevsky District

== Kaluga Oblast ==
As of 2010, one rural locality in Kaluga Oblast bears this name:

- Andreyevka, Kaluga Oblast, a village in Dzerzhinsky District

== Kemerovo Oblast ==
As of 2010, one rural locality in Kemerovo Oblast bears this name:

- Andreyevka, Kemerovo Oblast, a selo in Yelykayevskaya Rural Territory of Kemerovsky District

== Kostroma Oblast ==
As of 2010, two rural localities in Kostroma Oblast bear this name:

- Andreyevka, Kadyysky District, Kostroma Oblast, a village in Stolpinskoye Settlement of Kadyysky District
- Andreyevka, Sudislavsky District, Kostroma Oblast, a village in Voronskoye Settlement of Sudislavsky District

== Kursk Oblast ==
As of 2010, four rural localities in Kursk Oblast bear this name:

- Andreyevka, Fatezhsky District, Kursk Oblast, a village in Kolychevsky Selsoviet of Fatezhsky District
- Andreyevka, Gorshechensky District, Kursk Oblast, a village in Soldatsky Selsoviet of Gorshechensky District
- Andreyevka, Kastorensky District, Kursk Oblast, a village in Andreyevsky Selsoviet of Kastorensky District
- Andreyevka, Medvensky District, Kursk Oblast, a khutor in Vyshnedubovetsky Selsoviet of Medvensky District

== Lipetsk Oblast ==
As of 2010, two rural localities in Lipetsk Oblast bear this name:

- Andreyevka, Dobrinsky District, Lipetsk Oblast, a village in Tikhvinsky Selsoviet of Dobrinsky District
- Andreyevka, Lebedyansky District, Lipetsk Oblast, a village in Kuymansky Selsoviet of Lebedyansky District

== Mari El Republic ==
As of 2010, one rural locality in the Mari El Republic bears this name:

- Andreyevka, Mari El Republic, a village in Mikhaylovsky Rural Okrug of Sovetsky District

== Republic of Mordovia ==
As of 2010, six rural localities in the Republic of Mordovia bear this name:

- Andreyevka, Ardatovsky District, Republic of Mordovia, a selo in Kelvyadinsky Selsoviet of Ardatovsky District
- Andreyevka, Atyashevsky District, Republic of Mordovia, a selo in Andreyevsky Selsoviet of Atyashevsky District
- Andreyevka, Bolsheignatovsky District, Republic of Mordovia, a selo in Andreyevsky Selsoviet of Bolsheignatovsky District
- Andreyevka, Kovylkinsky District, Republic of Mordovia, a village in Primokshansky Selsoviet of Kovylkinsky District
- Andreyevka, Andreyevsky Selsoviet, Temnikovsky District, Republic of Mordovia, a village in Andreyevsky Selsoviet of Temnikovsky District
- Andreyevka, Zhegalovsky Selsoviet, Temnikovsky District, Republic of Mordovia, a village in Zhegalovsky Selsoviet of Temnikovsky District

== Moscow Oblast ==
As of 2010, two inhabited localities in Moscow Oblast bear this name.

Urban localities

- Andreyevka, Solnechnogorsky District, Moscow Oblast, a work settlement in Solnechnogorsky District

Rural localities

- Andreyevka, Kolomensky District, Moscow Oblast, a village in Nepetsinskoye Rural Settlement of Kolomensky District

== Nizhny Novgorod Oblast ==
As of 2010, six rural localities in Nizhny Novgorod Oblast bear this name:

- Andreyevka, Bogorodsky District, Nizhny Novgorod Oblast, a village in Shapkinsky Selsoviet of Bogorodsky District
- Andreyevka, Gaginsky District, Nizhny Novgorod Oblast, a settlement in Bolshearatsky Selsoviet of Gaginsky District
- Andreyevka, Pilninsky District, Nizhny Novgorod Oblast, a village in Deyanovsky Selsoviet of Pilninsky District
- Andreyevka, Sergachsky District, Nizhny Novgorod Oblast, a selo in Andreyevsky Selsoviet of Sergachsky District
- Andreyevka, Sokolsky District, Nizhny Novgorod Oblast, a village in Loyminsky Selsoviet of Sokolsky District
- Andreyevka, Sosnovsky District, Nizhny Novgorod Oblast, a village in Krutetsky Selsoviet of Sosnovsky District

== Novosibirsk Oblast ==
As of 2010, two rural localities in Novosibirsk Oblast bear this name:

- Andreyevka, Bagansky District, Novosibirsk Oblast, a selo in Bagansky District
- Andreyevka, Kuybyshevsky District, Novosibirsk Oblast, a village in Kuybyshevsky District

== Omsk Oblast ==
As of 2010, six rural localities in Omsk Oblast bear this name:

- Andreyevka, Lyubinsky District, Omsk Oblast, a village in Bogolyubovsky Rural Okrug of Lyubinsky District
- Andreyevka, Okoneshnikovsky District, Omsk Oblast, a village in Andreyevsky Rural Okrug of Okoneshnikovsky District
- Andreyevka, Omsky District, Omsk Oblast, a selo in Andreyevsky Rural Okrug of Omsky District
- Andreyevka, Sargatsky District, Omsk Oblast, a selo in Andreyevsky Rural Okrug of Sargatsky District
- Andreyevka, Sedelnikovsky District, Omsk Oblast, a village in Golubovsky Rural Okrug of Sedelnikovsky District
- Andreyevka, Tavrichesky District, Omsk Oblast, a village in Neverovsky Rural Okrug of Tavrichesky District

== Orenburg Oblast ==
As of 2010, ten rural localities in Orenburg Oblast bear this name:

- Andreyevka, Abdulinsky District, Orenburg Oblast, a selo in Malosurmetsky Selsoviet of Abdulinsky District
- Andreyevka, Adamovsky District, Orenburg Oblast, a selo in Terensaysky Selsoviet of Adamovsky District
- Andreyevka, Akbulaksky District, Orenburg Oblast, a selo in Shkunovsky Selsoviet of Akbulaksky District
- Andreyevka, Belyayevsky District, Orenburg Oblast, a selo in Klyuchevsky Selsoviet of Belyayevsky District
- Andreyevka, Grachyovsky District, Orenburg Oblast, a settlement in Verkhneignashkinsky Selsoviet of Grachyovsky District
- Andreyevka, Kurmanayevsky District, Orenburg Oblast, a selo in Andreyevsky Selsoviet of Kurmanayevsky District
- Andreyevka, Sakmarsky District, Orenburg Oblast, a selo in Belousovsky Selsoviet of Sakmarsky District
- Andreyevka, Saraktashsky District, Orenburg Oblast, a selo in Petrovsky Selsoviet of Saraktashsky District
- Andreyevka, Aksenkinsky Selsoviet, Severny District, Orenburg Oblast, a village in Aksenkinsky Selsoviet of Severny District
- Andreyevka, Rychkovsky Selsoviet, Severny District, Orenburg Oblast, a village in Rychkovsky Selsoviet of Severny District

== Oryol Oblast ==
As of 2010, three rural localities in Oryol Oblast bear this name:

- Andreyevka, Karlovsky Selsoviet, Kolpnyansky District, Oryol Oblast, a village in Karlovsky Selsoviet of Kolpnyansky District
- Andreyevka, Krasnyansky Selsoviet, Kolpnyansky District, Oryol Oblast, a village in Krasnyansky Selsoviet of Kolpnyansky District
- Andreyevka, Kromskoy District, Oryol Oblast, a village in Apalkovsky Selsoviet of Kromskoy District

== Penza Oblast ==
As of 2010, four rural localities in Penza Oblast bear this name:

- Andreyevka, Kamensky District, Penza Oblast, a selo in Golovinshchinsky Selsoviet of Kamensky District
- Andreyevka, Pachelmsky District, Penza Oblast, a village in Novotolkovsky Selsoviet of Pachelmsky District
- Andreyevka, Penzensky District, Penza Oblast, a selo in Pokrovo-Berezovsky Selsoviet of Penzensky District
- Andreyevka, Zemetchinsky District, Penza Oblast, a village in Krasnodubravsky Selsoviet of Zemetchinsky District

== Perm Krai ==
As of 2010, three rural localities in Perm Krai bear this name:

- Andreyevka, Kungursky District, Perm Krai, a village in Kungursky District
- Andreyevka, Okhansky District, Perm Krai, a selo in Okhansky District
- Andreyevka, Ordinsky District, Perm Krai, a village in Ordinsky District

== Primorsky Krai ==
As of 2010, two rural localities in Primorsky Krai bear this name:

- Andreyevka, Khasansky District, Primorsky Krai, a selo in Khasansky District
- Andreyevka, Yakovlevsky District, Primorsky Krai, a selo in Yakovlevsky District

== Ryazan Oblast ==
As of 2010, three rural localities in Ryazan Oblast bear this name:

- Andreyevka, Miloslavsky District, Ryazan Oblast, a settlement in Pavlovsky Rural Okrug of Miloslavsky District
- Andreyevka, Pitelinsky District, Ryazan Oblast, a village in Veryayevsky Rural Okrug of Pitelinsky District
- Andreyevka, Sarayevsky District, Ryazan Oblast, a village in Alexeyevsky Rural Okrug of Sarayevsky District

== Samara Oblast ==
As of 2010, two rural localities in Samara Oblast bear this name:

- Andreyevka, Bogatovsky District, Samara Oblast, a selo in Bogatovsky District
- Andreyevka, Koshkinsky District, Samara Oblast, a village in Koshkinsky District

== Saratov Oblast ==
As of 2010, nine rural localities in Saratov Oblast bear this name:

- Andreyevka, Arkadaksky District, Saratov Oblast, a station in Arkadaksky District
- Andreyevka, Atkarsky District, Saratov Oblast, a village in Atkarsky District
- Andreyevka, Balakovsky District, Saratov Oblast, a selo in Balakovsky District
- Andreyevka, Baltaysky District, Saratov Oblast, a village in Baltaysky District
- Andreyevka, Marksovsky District, Saratov Oblast, a selo in Marksovsky District
- Andreyevka, Turkovsky District, Saratov Oblast, a selo in Turkovsky District
- Andreyevka, Voskresensky District, Saratov Oblast, a village in Voskresensky District
- Andreyevka (selo), Yekaterinovsky District, Saratov Oblast, a selo in Yekaterinovsky District
- Andreyevka (village), Yekaterinovsky District, Saratov Oblast, a village in Yekaterinovsky District

== Smolensk Oblast ==
As of 2010, four rural localities in Smolensk Oblast bear this name:

- Andreyevka, Gagarinsky District, Smolensk Oblast, a village in Pokrovskoye Rural Settlement of Gagarinsky District
- Andreyevka, Kholm-Zhirkovsky District, Smolensk Oblast, a village in Tomskoye Rural Settlement of Kholm-Zhirkovsky District
- Andreyevka, Roslavlskoye Rural Settlement, Roslavlsky District, Smolensk Oblast, a village in Roslavlskoye Rural Settlement of Roslavlsky District
- Andreyevka, Zharynskoye Rural Settlement, Roslavlsky District, Smolensk Oblast, a village in Zharynskoye Rural Settlement of Roslavlsky District

== Sverdlovsk Oblast ==
As of 2010, one rural locality in Sverdlovsk Oblast bears this name:

- Andreyevka, Sverdlovsk Oblast, a village in Sysertsky District

== Tambov Oblast ==
As of 2010, eleven rural localities in Tambov Oblast bear this name:

- Andreyevka, Michurinsky District, Tambov Oblast, a village in Zavoronezhsky Selsoviet of Michurinsky District
- Andreyevka, Muchkapsky District, Tambov Oblast, a village in Zapolatovsky Selsoviet of Muchkapsky District
- Andreyevka, Nikiforovsky District, Tambov Oblast, a village in Yekaterininsky Selsoviet of Nikiforovsky District
- Andreyevka, Gavrilovsky Selsoviet, Rzhaksinsky District, Tambov Oblast, a village in Gavrilovsky Selsoviet of Rzhaksinsky District
- Andreyevka, Zolotovsky Selsoviet, Rzhaksinsky District, Tambov Oblast, a village in Zolotovsky Selsoviet of Rzhaksinsky District
- Andreyevka, Sampursky District, Tambov Oblast, a village in Satinsky Selsoviet of Sampursky District
- Andreyevka, Sosnovsky District, Tambov Oblast, a selo in Andreyevsky Selsoviet of Sosnovsky District
- Andreyevka, Staroyuryevsky District, Tambov Oblast, a village in Vishnevsky Selsoviet of Staroyuryevsky District
- Andreyevka, Bolshelipovitsky Selsoviet, Tambovsky District, Tambov Oblast, a village in Bolshelipovitsky Selsoviet of Tambovsky District
- Andreyevka, Dubrovsky Selsoviet, Tambovsky District, Tambov Oblast, a village in Dubrovsky Selsoviet of Tambovsky District
- Andreyevka, Tokaryovsky District, Tambov Oblast, a village in Alexandrovsky Selsoviet of Tokaryovsky District

== Republic of Tatarstan ==
As of 2010, five rural localities in the Republic of Tatarstan bear this name:

- Andreyevka, Alexeyevsky District, Republic of Tatarstan, a village in Alexeyevsky District
- Andreyevka, Bugulminsky District, Republic of Tatarstan, a selo in Bugulminsky District
- Andreyevka, Cheremshansky District, Republic of Tatarstan, a village in Cheremshansky District
- Andreyevka, Novosheshminsky District, Republic of Tatarstan, a village in Novosheshminsky District
- Andreyevka, Nurlatsky District, Republic of Tatarstan, a selo in Nurlatsky District

== Tomsk Oblast ==
As of 2010, one rural locality in Tomsk Oblast bears this name:

- Andreyevka, Tomsk Oblast, a selo in Chainsky District

== Tula Oblast ==
As of 2010, eight rural localities in Tula Oblast bear this name:

- Andreyevka, Aleksinsky District, Tula Oblast, a village in Solopensky Rural Okrug of Aleksinsky District
- Andreyevka, Dubensky District, Tula Oblast, a village in Novopavshinsky Rural Okrug of Dubensky District
- Andreyevka, Kimovsky District, Tula Oblast, a village in Rumyantsevsky Rural Okrug of Kimovsky District
- Andreyevka, Kurkinsky District, Tula Oblast, a selo in Andreyevskaya Volost of Kurkinsky District
- Andreyevka, Suvorovsky District, Tula Oblast, a village in Markovskaya Rural Territory of Suvorovsky District
- Andreyevka, Tyoplo-Ogaryovsky District, Tula Oblast, a village in Mosyukovsky Rural Okrug of Tyoplo-Ogaryovsky District
- Andreyevka, Venyovsky District, Tula Oblast, a village in Studenetsky Rural Okrug of Venyovsky District
- Andreyevka, Yefremovsky District, Tula Oblast, a village in Stepnokhutorskoy Rural Okrug of Yefremovsky District

== Ulyanovsk Oblast ==
As of 2010, three rural localities in Ulyanovsk Oblast bear this name:

- Andreyevka, Cherdaklinsky District, Ulyanovsk Oblast, a selo in Kalmayursky Rural Okrug of Cherdaklinsky District
- Andreyevka, Nikolayevsky District, Ulyanovsk Oblast, a selo in Slavkinsky Rural Okrug of Nikolayevsky District
- Andreyevka, Terengulsky District, Ulyanovsk Oblast, a village in Krasnoborsky Rural Okrug of Terengulsky District

== Vladimir Oblast ==
As of 2010, two rural localities in Vladimir Oblast bear this name:

- Andreyevka, Kovrovsky District, Vladimir Oblast, a village in Kovrovsky District
- Andreyevka, Selivanovsky District, Vladimir Oblast, a village in Selivanovsky District

== Volgograd Oblast ==
As of 2010, one rural locality in Volgograd Oblast bears this name:

- Andreyevka, Volgograd Oblast, a selo in Alexandrovsky Selsoviet of Zhirnovsky District

== Voronezh Oblast ==
As of 2010, three rural localities in Voronezh Oblast bear this name:

- Andreyevka, Nizhnedevitsky District, Voronezh Oblast, a selo in Andreyevskoye Rural Settlement of Nizhnedevitsky District
- Andreyevka, Novousmansky District, Voronezh Oblast, a settlement in Trudovskoye Rural Settlement of Novousmansky District
- Andreyevka, Podgorensky District, Voronezh Oblast, a selo in Lykovskoye Rural Settlement of Podgorensky District

== Yaroslavl Oblast ==
As of 2010, one rural locality in Yaroslavl Oblast bears this name:

- Andreyevka, Yaroslavl Oblast, a village in Zaozersky Rural Okrug of Uglichsky District

== See also ==
- Andrey
- Andreyev
- Andriivka (disambiguation), a list of places with the equivalent Ukrainian name in Ukraine
