= Istyak =

Istyak Истяк
- Selo
- Location within Bashkortostan Location within Russia
- Coordinates: 56°16′N 55°01′E
- Country: Russia
- Region: Bashkortostan
- District: Yanaulsky District
- Time zone: UTC+5:00

Istyak (Russian: Истяк; Bashkir: Истәк, İstäk) is a rural locality (a selo) and the administrative centre of Istyaksky Selsoviet, Yanaulsky District, Bashkortostan, Russia. The population was 425 as of 2010. There are 7 streets.

== Geography ==
Istyak is located 8 km east of Yanaul (the district's administrative centre) by road. Yanaul is the nearest rural locality.
