= Akylbay =

Akylbay Акылбай
- Village
- Location within Bashkortostan Location within Russia
- Coordinates: 56°20′N 54°39′E
- Country: Russia
- Region: Bashkortostan
- District: Yanaulsky District
- Time zone: UTC+5:00

Akylbay (Russian: Акылбай; Bashkir: Аҡылбай, Aqılbay) is a rural locality (a village) in Voyadinsky Selsoviet, Yanaulsky District, Bashkortostan, Russia. The population was 78 as of 2010. There are 5 streets.

== Geography ==
Akylbay is located 30 km northwest of Yanaul (the district's administrative centre) by road. Iskhak is the nearest rural locality.
