= Chetyrman =

Chetyrman Четырман
- Selo
- Location within Bashkortostan Location within Russia
- Coordinates: 56°09′N 55°17′E
- Country: Russia
- Region: Bashkortostan
- District: Yanaulsky District
- Time zone: UTC+5:00

Chetyrman (Russian: Четырман; Bashkir: Сытырман, Sıtırman) is a rural locality (a selo) in Yamadinsky Selsoviet, Yanaulsky District, Bashkortostan, Russia. The population was 188 as of 2010. There are 5 streets.

== Geography ==
Chetyrman is located 31 km southeast of Yanaul (the district's administrative centre) by road. Yamady is the nearest rural locality.
