= 1st otdeleniya sovkhoza 'Novousmanskiy' =

1st otdeleniya sovkhoza 'Novousmanskiy' 1-го отделения совхоза «Новоусманский»
- Settlement
- Location within Voronezh Oblast Location within Russia
- Coordinates: 51.725833°N 39.715833°E
- Country: Russia
- Region: Voronezh Oblast
- District: Novousmansky District
- Time zone: UTC+03:00

1st otdeleniya sovkhoza 'Novousmanskiy' (Russian: 1-го отделения совхоза «Новоусманский») is a rural locality (a settlement) in Babyakovskoye Rural Settlement of Novousmansky District, Russia. The population was 1185 as of 2010. The village is part of the village of Babiakovo and is located in the forest-steppe zone. There are 19 streets.

== Geography ==
The settlement is located 20 km southwest of Novaya Usman (the district's administrative centre) by road. Maslovka is the nearest rural locality.
