= Bayguzino, Yanaulsky District, Republic of Bashkortostan =

Bayguzino Байгузино
- Village
- Location within Bashkortostan Location within Russia
- Coordinates: 56°10′N 54°47′E
- Country: Russia
- Region: Bashkortostan
- District: Yanaulsky District
- Time zone: UTC+5:00

Bayguzino (Russian: Байгузино; Bashkir: Байғужа, Bayğuja) is a rural locality (a village) and the administrative centre of Bayguzinsky Selsoviet, Yanaulsky District, Bashkortostan, Russia. The population was 487 as of 2010. There are 6 streets.

== Geography ==
Bayguzino is located 16 km southwest of Yanaul (the district's administrative centre) by road. Urakayevo is the nearest rural locality.
