= Sadovy, Voronezh Oblast =

Sadovy Садовый
- Settlement
- Location within Voronezh Oblast Location within Russia
- Coordinates: 51°30′N 39°41′E
- Country: Russia
- Region: Voronezh Oblast
- District: Novousmansky District
- Time zone: UTC+3:00

Sadovy (Russian: Садовый) is a rural locality (a settlement) in Timiryazevskoye Rural Settlement, Novousmansky District, Voronezh Oblast, Russia. The population was 205 as of 2010. There are three streets.

== Geography ==
Sadovy is located 32 km southeast of Novaya Usman (the district's administrative centre) by road. Krylovka is the nearest rural locality.
