= Gorenskiye Vyselki =

Gorenskiye Vyselki Горенские Выселки
- Selo
- Location within Voronezh Oblast Location within Russia
- Coordinates: 51°33′N 39°44′E
- Country: Russia
- Region: Voronezh Oblast
- District: Novousmansky District
- Time zone: UTC+3:00

Gorenskiye Vyselki (Russian: Горенские Выселки) is a rural locality (a selo) in Timiryazevskoye Rural Settlement, Novousmansky District, Voronezh Oblast, Russia. The population was 557 as of 2010. There are 8 streets.

== Geography ==
Gorenskiye Vyselki is located 7 km southeast of Novaya Usman (the district's administrative centre) by road. Kazanskaya Khava is the nearest rural locality.
