= Ushanovka =

Rural locality in Voronezh Oblast, Russia

Ushanovka Ушановка
- Selo
- Location within Voronezh Oblast Location within Russia
- Coordinates: 51°31′N 39°37′E
- Country: Russia
- Region: Voronezh Oblast
- District: Novousmansky District
- Time zone: UTC+3:00

Ushanovka (Russian: Ушановка) is a rural locality (a selo) in Timiryazevskoye Rural Settlement, Novousmansky District, Voronezh Oblast, Russia. The population was 97 as of 2010.

== Geography ==
Ushanovka is located 29 km southeast of Novaya Usman (the district's administrative centre) by road. Krylovka is the nearest rural locality.
