= Susady-Ebalak =

Susady-Ebalak Сусады-Эбалак
- Selo
- Location within Bashkortostan Location within Russia
- Coordinates: 56°11′N 54°54′E
- Country: Russia
- Region: Bashkortostan
- District: Yanaulsky District
- Time zone: UTC+5:00

Susady-Ebalak (Russian: Сусады-Эбалак; Bashkir: Сусаҙы-Ябалаҡ, Susaźı-Yabalaq) is a rural locality (a selo) and the administrative centre of Pevomaysky Selsoviet, Yanaulsky District, Bashkortostan, Russia. The population was 402 as of 2010. There are 7 streets.

== Geography ==
Susady-Ebalak is located 11 km south of Yanaul (the district's administrative centre) by road. Kostino is the nearest rural locality.
