= Yugamash =

Yugamash Югамаш
- Selo
- Location within Bashkortostan Location within Russia
- Coordinates: 56°10′N 55°23′E
- Country: Russia
- Region: Bashkortostan
- District: Yanaulsky District
- Time zone: UTC+5:00

Yugamash (Russian: Югамаш; Bashkir: Йөгәмеш, Yögämeş) is a rural locality (a selo) in Yamadinsky Selsoviet, Yanaulsky District, Bashkortostan, Russia. The population was 273 as of 2010.

== Geography ==
Yugamash is located 38 kilometres (24 mi) southeast of Yanaul (the district's administrative centre) by road. Andreyevka is the nearest rural locality.
