= Baysarovo =

Baysarovo Байсарово
- Village
- Location within Bashkortostan Location within Russia
- Coordinates: 56°28′N 54°37′E
- Country: Russia
- Region: Bashkortostan
- District: Yanaulsky District
- Time zone: UTC+5:00

Baysarovo (Russian: Байсарово; Bashkir: Байсар, Baysar) is a rural locality (a village) in Voyadinsky Selsoviet, Yanaulsky District, Bashkortostan, Russia. The population was 5 as of 2010. There are 2 streets.

== Geography ==
Baysarovo is located 59 km northwest of Yanaul (the district's administrative centre) by road. Burenka is the nearest rural locality.
