= Novy Susadybash =

Novy Susadybash Новый Сусадыбаш
- Village
- Location within Bashkortostan Location within Russia
- Coordinates: 56°06′N 54°50′E
- Country: Russia
- Region: Bashkortostan
- District: Yanaulsky District
- Time zone: UTC+5:00

Novy Susadybash (Russian: Новый Сусадыбаш; Bashkir: Яңы Сусаҙыбаш, Yañı Susaźıbaş) is a rural locality (a village) in Pevomaysky Selsoviet, Yanaulsky District, Bashkortostan, Russia. The population was 87 as of 2010. There are 2 streets.

== Geography ==
Novy Susadybash is located 22 km south of Yanaul (the district's administrative centre) by road. Stary Susadybash is the nearest rural locality.
