= Isanbayevo, Yanaulsky District, Republic of Bashkortostan =

Isanbayevo Исанбаево
- Selo
- Location within Bashkortostan Location within Russia
- Coordinates: 56°02′N 55°08′E
- Country: Russia
- Region: Bashkortostan
- District: Yanaulsky District
- Time zone: UTC+5:00

Isanbayevo (Russian: Исанбаево; Bashkir: Иҫәнбай, İśänbay) is a rural locality (a selo) in Izhboldinsky Selsoviet, Yanaulsky District, Bashkortostan, Russia. The population was 172 as of 2010. There are 5 streets.

== Geography ==
Isanbayevo is located 33 km southeast of Yanaul (the district's administrative centre) by road. Izhboldino is the nearest rural locality.
