= Gorki, Voronezh Oblast =

Gorki Горки
- Selo
- Location within Voronezh Oblast Location within Russia
- Coordinates: 51°43′N 39°35′E
- Country: Russia
- Region: Voronezh Oblast
- District: Novousmansky District
- Time zone: UTC+3:00

Gorki (Russian: Горки) is a rural locality (a selo) in Orlovskoye Rural Settlement, Novousmansky District, Voronezh Oblast, Russia. The population was 389 as of 2010. There are 10 streets.

== Geography ==
Gorki is located 18 km northeast of Novaya Usman (the district's administrative centre) by road. Orlovo is the nearest rural locality.
