= Cheraul =

Cheraul Чераул
- Selo
- Location within Bashkortostan Location within Russia
- Coordinates: 56°04′N 54°55′E
- Country: Russia
- Region: Bashkortostan
- District: Yanaulsky District
- Time zone: UTC+5:00

Cheraul (Russian: Чераул; Bashkir: Сөрауыл, Sörawıl) is a rural locality (a selo) in Pevomaysky Selsoviet, Yanaulsky District, Bashkortostan, Russia. The population was 121 as of 2010. There are 4 streets.

== Geography ==
Cheraul is located 23 km south of Yanaul (the district's administrative centre) by road. Zaytsevo is the nearest rural locality.
