= Shuberskoye =

Shuberskoye Шуберское
- Settlement
- Location within Voronezh Oblast Location within Russia
- Coordinates: 51°45′N 39°25′E
- Country: Russia
- Region: Voronezh Oblast
- District: Novousmansky District
- Time zone: UTC+3:00

Shuberskoye (Russian: Шуберское) is a rural locality (a settlement) and the administrative center of Shuberskoye Rural Settlement, Novousmansky District, Voronezh Oblast, Russia. The population was 2,150 as of 2010. There are 10 streets.

== Geography ==
Shuberskoye is located 18 km north of Novaya Usman (the district's administrative centre) by road. Polynovka is the nearest rural locality.
