= Konigovo =

Konigovo Конигово
- Village
- Location within Bashkortostan Location within Russia
- Coordinates: 56°13′N 54°52′E
- Country: Russia
- Region: Bashkortostan
- District: Yanaulsky District
- Time zone: UTC+5:00

Konigovo (Russian: Конигово; Bashkir: Кониг, Konig) is a rural locality (a village) in Shudeksky Selsoviet, Yanaulsky District, Bashkortostan, Russia. The population was 142 as of 2010. There is 1 street.

== Geography ==
Konigovo is located 7 km southwest of Yanaul (the district's administrative centre) by road. Shudek is the nearest rural locality.
