= Kichikir =

Kichikir Кичикир
- Village
- Location within Bashkortostan Location within Russia
- Coordinates: 56°09′N 54°37′E
- Country: Russia
- Region: Bashkortostan
- District: Yanaulsky District
- Time zone: UTC+5:00

Kichikir (Russian: Кичикир; Bashkir: Кесеҡор, Keseqor) is a rural locality (a village) in Starokudashevsky Selsoviet, Yanaulsky District, Bashkortostan, Russia. The population was 96 as of 2010. There are 4 streets.

== Geography ==
Kichikir is located 20 km southwest of Yanaul (the district's administrative centre) by road. Vedresevo is the nearest rural locality.
