= Salikhovo, Yanaulsky District, Republic of Bashkortostan =

Salikhovo Салихово
- Selo
- Location within Bashkortostan Location within Russia
- Coordinates: 56°11′N 55°25′E
- Country: Russia
- Region: Bashkortostan
- District: Yanaulsky District
- Time zone: UTC+5:00

Salikhovo (Russian: Салихово; Bashkir: Сәлих, Sälix) is a rural locality (a selo) in Yamadinsky Selsoviet, Yanaulsky District, Bashkortostan, Russia. The population was 345 as of 2010. There are 6 streets.

== Geography ==
Salikhovo is located 43 km southeast of Yanaul (the district's administrative centre) by road. Yugamash is the nearest rural locality.
