= Stary Susadybash =

Stary Susadybash Старый Сусадыбаш
- Village
- Location within Bashkortostan Location within Russia
- Coordinates: 56°07′N 54°50′E
- Country: Russia
- Region: Bashkortostan
- District: Yanaulsky District
- Time zone: UTC+5:00

Stary Susadybash (Russian: Старый Сусадыбаш; Bashkir: Иҫке Сусаҙыбаш, İśke Susaźıbaş) is a rural locality (a village) in Pevomaysky Selsoviet, Yanaulsky District, Bashkortostan, Russia. The population was 172 as of 2010. There are 2 streets.

== Geography ==
Stary Susadybash is located 20 km south of Yanaul (the district's administrative centre) by road. Andreyevka is the nearest rural locality.
