= Novy Aldar =

Novy Aldar Новый Алдар
- Village
- Location within Bashkortostan Location within Russia
- Coordinates: 56°07′N 55°10′E
- Country: Russia
- Region: Bashkortostan
- District: Yanaulsky District
- Time zone: UTC+5:00

Novy Aldar (Russian: Новый Алдар; Bashkir: Яңы Алдар, Yañı Aldar) is a rural locality (a village) in Asavdybashsky Selsoviet, Yanaulsky District, Bashkortostan, Russia. The population was 100 as of 2010. There is 1 street.

== Geography ==
Novy Aldar is located 28 km southeast of Yanaul (the district's administrative centre) by road. Igrovka is the nearest rural locality.
