= Urakayevo, Yanaulsky District, Republic of Bashkortostan =

Urakayevo Уракаево
- Village
- Location within Bashkortostan Location within Russia
- Coordinates: 56°11′N 54°47′E
- Country: Russia
- Region: Bashkortostan
- District: Yanaulsky District
- Time zone: UTC+5:00

Urakayevo (Russian: Уракаево; Bashkir: Ураҡай, Uraqay) is a rural locality (a village) in Bayguzinsky Selsoviet, Yanaulsky District, Bashkortostan, Russia. The population was 173 as of 2010. There are 4 streets.

== Geography ==
Urakayevo is located 14 km southwest of Yanaul (the district's administrative centre) by road. Gudburovo is the nearest rural locality.
