= Yanbaris =

Yanbaris Янбарис
- Village
- Location within Bashkortostan Location within Russia
- Coordinates: 56°12′N 54°38′E
- Country: Russia
- Region: Bashkortostan
- District: Yanaulsky District
- Time zone: UTC+5:00

Yanbaris (Bashkir and Russian: Янбарис) is a rural locality (a village) in Kisak-Kainsky Selsoviet, Yanaulsky District, Bashkortostan, Russia. The population was 101 as of 2010. There are 3 streets.

== Geography ==
Yanbaris is located 22 km southwest of Yanaul (the district's administrative centre) by road. Kisak-Kain is the nearest rural locality.
