= Petrovka, Yanaulsky District, Republic of Bashkortostan =

Petrovka Петровка
- Village
- Location within Bashkortostan Location within Russia
- Coordinates: 56°06′N 55°02′E
- Country: Russia
- Region: Bashkortostan
- District: Yanaulsky District
- Time zone: UTC+5:00

Petrovka (Russian: Петровка) is a rural locality (a village) in Orlovsky Selsoviet, Yanaulsky District, Bashkortostan, Russia. The population was 171 as of 2010. There is 1 street.

== Geography ==
Petrovka is located 24 km southeast of Yanaul (the district's administrative centre) by road. Atlegach is the nearest rural locality.
