= Stary Varyash =

Stary Varyash Старый Варяш
- Selo
- Location within Bashkortostan Location within Russia
- Coordinates: 56°05′N 55°17′E
- Country: Russia
- Region: Bashkortostan
- District: Yanaulsky District
- Time zone: UTC+5:00

Stary Varyash (Russian: Старый Варяш; Bashkir: Иҫке Вәрәш, İśke Wäräş) is a rural locality (a selo) and the administrative centre of Starovaryashsky Selsoviet, Yanaulsky District, Bashkortostan, Russia. The population was 285 as of 2010. There are 6 streets.

== Geography ==
Stary Varyash is located 40 km southeast of Yanaul (the district's administrative centre) by road. Budya Varyash is the nearest rural locality.
