= Badryash =

Badryash Бадряш
- Village
- Location within Bashkortostan Location within Russia
- Coordinates: 56°15′N 54°43′E
- Country: Russia
- Region: Bashkortostan
- District: Yanaulsky District
- Time zone: UTC+5:00

Badryash (Russian: Бадряш; Bashkir: Бәҙрәш, Bäźräş) is a rural locality (a village) in Kisak-Kainsky Selsoviet, Yanaulsky District, Bashkortostan, Russia. The population was 50 as of 2010.

== Geography ==
Badryash is located 22 km west of Yanaul (the district's administrative centre) by road. Progress is the nearest rural locality.
