= Sibady =

Sibady Сибады
- Selo
- Location within Bashkortostan Location within Russia
- Coordinates: 56°11′N 55°14′E
- Country: Russia
- Region: Bashkortostan
- District: Yanaulsky District
- Time zone: UTC+5:00

Sibady (Russian: Сибады; Bashkir: Сибәҙе, Sibäźe) is a rural locality (a selo) in Asavdybashsky Selsoviet, Yanaulsky District, Bashkortostan, Russia. The population was 146 as of 2010. There are 2 streets.

== Geography ==
Sibady is located 33 km southeast of Yanaul (the district's administrative centre) by road. Asavdyash is the nearest rural locality.
