= Kaymashbash =

Kaymashbash Каймашабаш
- Selo
- Location within Bashkortostan Location within Russia
- Coordinates: 56°11′N 55°04′E
- Country: Russia
- Region: Bashkortostan
- District: Yanaulsky District
- Time zone: UTC+5:00

Kaymashbash (Russian: Каймашабаш; Bashkir: Ҡаймашабаш, Qaymaşabaş) is a rural locality (a selo) in Itkineyevsky Selsoviet, Yanaulsky District, Bashkortostan, Russia. The population was 323 as of 2010. There are 2 streets.

== Geography ==
Kaymashbash is located 14 km southeast of Yanaul (the district's administrative centre) by road. Kaymasha is the nearest rural locality.
