= Changakul =

Changakul Чангакуль
- Village
- Location within Bashkortostan Location within Russia
- Coordinates: 56°23′N 54°34′E
- Country: Russia
- Region: Bashkortostan
- District: Yanaulsky District
- Time zone: UTC+5:00

Changakul (Russian: Чангакуль; Bashkir: Сәңгекүл, Säñgekül) is a rural locality (a village) in Voyadinsky Selsoviet, Yanaulsky District, Bashkortostan, Russia. The population was 52 as of 2010. There are 3 streets.

== Geography ==
Changakul is located 38 km northwest of Yanaul (the district's administrative centre) by road. Voyady is the nearest rural locality.
