= Kaymasha =

Kaymasha Каймаша
- Village
- Location within Bashkortostan Location within Russia
- Coordinates: 56°10′N 55°03′E
- Country: Russia
- Region: Bashkortostan
- District: Yanaulsky District
- Time zone: UTC+5:00

Kaymasha (Russian: Каймаша; Bashkir: Ҡаймаша, Qaymaşa) is a rural locality (a village) in Itkineyevsky Selsoviet, Yanaulsky District, Bashkortostan, Russia. The population was 224 as of 2010. There are two streets.

== Geography ==
Kaymasha is located 13 km southeast of Yanaul (the district's administrative centre) by road. Kaymashbash is the nearest rural locality.
