= Iskhak =

Iskhak Исхак
- Village
- Location within Bashkortostan Location within Russia
- Coordinates: 56°19′N 54°42′E
- Country: Russia
- Region: Bashkortostan
- District: Yanaulsky District
- Time zone: UTC+5:00

Iskhak (Russian: Исхак; Bashkir: Исхаҡ, İsxaq) is a rural locality (a village) in Novoartaulsky Selsoviet, Yanaulsky District, Bashkortostan, Russia. The population was 12 as of 2010. There is 1 street.

== Geography ==
Iskhak is located 31 km northwest of Yanaul (the district's administrative centre) by road. Bulat-Yelga is the nearest rural locality.
