= Yangus-Narat =

Yangus-Narat Янгуз-Нарат
- Village
- Location within Bashkortostan Location within Russia
- Coordinates: 56°09′N 54°58′E
- Country: Russia
- Region: Bashkortostan
- District: Yanaulsky District
- Time zone: UTC+5:00

Yangus-Narat (Russian: Янгуз-Нарат; Bashkir: Яңғыҙнарат, Yañğıźnarat) is a rural locality (a village) in Itkineyevsky Selsoviet, Yanaulsky District, Bashkortostan, Russia. The population was 94 as of 2010. There is 1 street.

== Geography ==
Yangus-Narat is located 12 km south of Yanaul (the district's administrative centre) by road. Susady-Ebalak is the nearest rural locality.
