= Tatarskaya Urada =

Tatarskaya Urada Татарская Урада
- Village
- Location within Bashkortostan Location within Russia
- Coordinates: 56°19′N 54°54′E
- Country: Russia
- Region: Bashkortostan
- District: Yanaulsky District
- Time zone: UTC+5:00

Tatarskaya Urada (Russian: Татарская Урада; Bashkir: Татар Ураҙы, Tatar Uraźı) is a rural locality (a village) in Novoartaulsky Selsoviet, Yanaulsky District, Bashkortostan, Russia. The population was 269 as of 2010. There are 5 streets.

== Geography ==
Tatarskaya Urada is located 10 km north of Yanaul (the district's administrative centre) by road. Tash-Yelga is the nearest rural locality. рядом протекает река буй.
