= Nizhnyaya Katukhovka =

Nizhnyaya Katukhovka Нижняя Катуховка
- Selo
- Location within Voronezh Oblast Location within Russia
- Coordinates: 51°40′N 39°52′E
- Country: Russia
- Region: Voronezh Oblast
- District: Novousmansky District
- Time zone: UTC+3:00

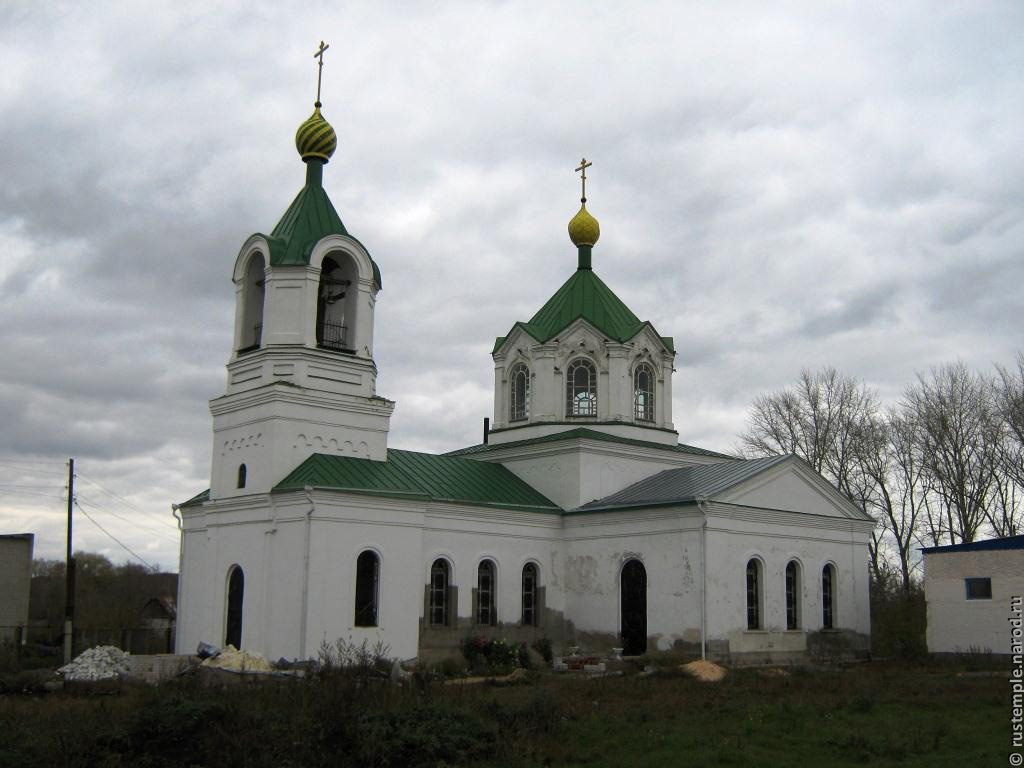

Nizhnyaya Katukhovka (Russian: Нижняя Катуховка) is a rural locality (a selo) and the administrative center of Nizhnekatukhovskoye Rural Settlement, Novousmansky District, Voronezh Oblast, Russia. The population was 604 as of 2010. There are 4 streets.

== Geography ==
Nizhnyaya Katukhovka is located 35 km east of Novaya Usman (the district's administrative centre) by road. Trudolyubovka is the nearest rural locality.
