= Asavdybash =

Asavdybash Асавдыбаш
- Selo
- Location within Bashkortostan Location within Russia
- Coordinates: 56°10′N 55°10′E
- Country: Russia
- Region: Bashkortostan
- District: Yanaulsky District
- Time zone: UTC+5:00

Asavdybash (Russian: Асавдыбаш; Bashkir: Асауҙыбаш, Asawźıbaş) is a rural locality (a selo) and the administrative centre of Asavdybashsky Selsoviet, Yanaulsky District, Bashkortostan, Russia. The population was 193 as of 2010. There are 3 streets.

== Geography ==
Asavdybash is located 27 km southeast of Yanaul (the district's administrative centre) by road. Yussukovo is the nearest rural locality.
