= Votskaya Urada =

Votskaya Urada Вотская Урада
- Selo
- Location within Bashkortostan Location within Russia
- Coordinates: 56°21′N 54°53′E
- Country: Russia
- Region: Bashkortostan
- District: Yanaulsky District
- Time zone: UTC+5:00

Votskaya Urada (Russian: Вотская Урада; Bashkir: Вотяк Ураҙы, Votyak Uraźı) is a rural locality (a selo) in Novoartaulsky Selsoviet, Yanaulsky District, Bashkortostan, Russia. The population was 155 as of 2010. There are 3 streets.

== Geography ==
Votskaya Urada is located 16 km north of Yanaul (the district's administrative centre) by road. Varyash is the nearest rural locality.
