= Karman-Aktau =

Karman-Aktau Карман-Актау
- Selo
- Location within Bashkortostan Location within Russia
- Coordinates: 56°19′N 54°34′E
- Country: Russia
- Region: Bashkortostan
- District: Yanaulsky District
- Time zone: UTC+5:00

Karman-Aktau (Russian: Карман-Актау; Bashkir: Ҡарман-Аҡтау, Qarman-Aqtaw) is a rural locality (a selo) in Voyadinsky Selsoviet, Yanaulsky District, Bashkortostan, Russia. The population was 65 as of 2010. There are 2 streets.

== Geography ==
Karman-Aktau is located 37 km west of Yanaul (the district's administrative centre) by road. Akylbay is the nearest rural locality.
