= Nokrat =

Nokrat Нократ
- Village
- Location within Bashkortostan Location within Russia
- Coordinates: 56°14′N 54°48′E
- Country: Russia
- Region: Bashkortostan
- District: Yanaulsky District
- Time zone: UTC+5:00

Nokrat (Russian: Нократ; Bashkir: Ноҡрат, Noqrat) is a rural locality (a village) in Bayguzinsky Selsoviet, Yanaulsky District, Bashkortostan, Russia. The population was 74 as of 2010. There are 2 streets.

== Geography ==
Nokrat is located 14 km southwest of Yanaul (the district's administrative centre) by road. Stary Artaul is the nearest rural locality.
