= Verkhnyaya Barabanovka =

Village in Bashkortostan, Russia

Verkhnyaya Barabanovka Верхняя Барабановка
- Village
- Location within Bashkortostan Location within Russia
- Coordinates: 56°17′N 55°19′E
- Country: Russia
- Region: Bashkortostan
- District: Yanaulsky District
- Time zone: UTC+5:00

Verkhnyaya Barabanovka (Russian: Верхняя Барабановка) is a rural locality in Maximovsky Selsoviet, Yanaulsky District, Bashkortostan, Russia. It has 6 streets with a population of 202 as of 2014.

== Geography ==
Verkhnyaya Barabanovka is located 33 km east of Yanaul (the district's administrative centre) by road. Maximovo is the nearest rural locality.
