= Kumalak, Republic of Bashkortostan =

Kumalak Кумалак
- Village
- Location within Bashkortostan Location within Russia
- Coordinates: 56°10′N 54°40′E
- Country: Russia
- Region: Bashkortostan
- District: Yanaulsky District
- Time zone: UTC+5:00

Kumalak (Russian: Кумалак; Bashkir: Ҡомалаҡ, Qomalaq) is a rural locality (a village) in Starokudashevsky Selsoviet, Yanaulsky District, Bashkortostan, Russia. The population was 141 as of 2010. There are 4 streets.

== Geography ==
Kumalak is located 26 km southwest of Yanaul (the district's administrative centre) by road. Yambayevo is the nearest rural locality.
