= Varyash =

Varyash Варяш
- Selo
- Location within Bashkortostan Location within Russia
- Coordinates: 56°21′N 54°50′E
- Country: Russia
- Region: Bashkortostan
- District: Yanaulsky District
- Time zone: UTC+5:00

Varyash (Russian: Варяш; Bashkir: Вәрәш, Wäräş) is a rural locality (a selo) in Novoartaulsky Selsoviet, Yanaulsky District, Bashkortostan, Russia. As of 2010, the population was 170. The locality has 2 streets.

== Geography ==
Varyash is located 20 km northwest of Yanaul, the district's administrative centre, by road. Varyashbash is the nearest rural locality.
