= Stary Artaul =

Stary Artaul Старый Артаул
- Selo
- Location within Bashkortostan Location within Russia
- Coordinates: 56°14′N 54°48′E
- Country: Russia
- Region: Bashkortostan
- District: Yanaulsky District
- Time zone: UTC+5:00

Stary Artaul (Russian: Старый Артаул; Bashkir: Иҫке Артауыл, İśke Artawıl) is a rural locality (a selo) in Bayguzinsky Selsoviet, Yanaulsky District, Bashkortostan, Russia. The population was 209 as of 2010. There are 2 streets.

== Geography ==
Stary Artaul is located 15 km west of Yanaul (the district's administrative centre) by road. Nokrat is the nearest rural locality.
