= Yamyady =

Yamyady Ямьяды
- Village
- Location within Bashkortostan Location within Russia
- Coordinates: 56°04′N 55°11′E
- Country: Russia
- Region: Bashkortostan
- District: Yanaulsky District
- Time zone: UTC+5:00

Yamyady (Russian: Ямьяды; Bashkir: Ямъяҙы, Yamyaźı) is a rural locality (a village) in Orlovsky Selsoviet, Yanaulsky District, Bashkortostan, Russia. The population was 43 as of 2010. There is 1 street.

== Geography ==
Yamyady is located 29 km southeast of Yanaul (the district's administrative centre) by road. Orlovka is the nearest rural locality.
