= Turtyk =

Turtyk Туртык
- Selo
- Location within Bashkortostan Location within Russia
- Coordinates: 56°24′N 54°38′E
- Country: Russia
- Region: Bashkortostan
- District: Yanaulsky District
- Time zone: UTC+5:00

Turtyk (Russian: Туртык; Bashkir: Туртыҡ, Turtıq) is a rural locality (a selo) in Voyadinsky Selsoviet, Yanaulsky District, Bashkortostan, Russia. The population was 84 as of 2010. There are 3 streets.

== Geography ==
Turtyk is located 32 km northwest of Yanaul (the district's administrative centre) by road. Voyady is the nearest rural locality.
