= Kyzyl-Yar, Yanaulsky District, Republic of Bashkortostan =

Kyzyl-Yar Кызыл-Яр
- Village
- Location within Bashkortostan Location within Russia
- Coordinates: 56°03′N 55°20′E
- Country: Russia
- Region: Bashkortostan
- District: Yanaulsky District
- Time zone: UTC+5:00

Kyzyl-Yar (Russian: Кызыл-Яр; Bashkir: Ҡыҙылъяр, Qıźılyar) is a rural locality (a village) in Mesyagutovsky Selsoviet, Yanaulsky District, Bashkortostan, Russia. The population was 121 as of 2010. There are 4 streets.

== Geography ==
Kyzyl-Yar is located 48 km southeast of Yanaul (the district's administrative centre) by road. Stary Aldar is the nearest rural locality.
