= Barabanovka =

Barabanovka Барабановка
- Selo
- Location within Bashkortostan Location within Russia
- Coordinates: 56°16′N 55°13′E
- Country: Russia
- Region: Bashkortostan
- District: Yanaulsky District
- Time zone: UTC+5:00

Barabanovka (Russian: Барабановка) is a rural locality (a selo) in Sandugachevsky Selsoviet, Yanaulsky District, Bashkortostan, Russia. The population was 373 as of 2010. There are five streets.

== Geography ==
Barabanovka is located 21 km east of Yanaul (the district's administrative centre) by road. Sandugach is the nearest rural locality.
