= 1st otdeleniya sovkhoza 'Maslovskiy' =

1st otdeleniya sovkhoza 'Maslovskiy' 1-го отделения совхоза «Масловский»
- Settlement
- Location within Voronezh Oblast Location within Russia
- Coordinates: 51.539444°N 39.341111°E
- Country: Russia
- Region: Voronezh Oblast
- District: Novousmansky District
- Time zone: UTC+03:00

1st otdeleniya sovkhoza 'Maslovskiy' (Russian: 1-го отделения совхоза «Масловский») is a rural locality (a settlement) in Nikolskoye Rural Settlement of Novousmansky District, Russia. The population was 3,827 (2021 census); 1185 as of 2010. The settlement is the administrative center of the Nikolsky rural settlement. There are 35 streets.

== Geography ==
The settlement is located 20 km southwest of Novaya Usman (the district's administrative centre) by road. Maslovka is the nearest rural locality.
