= Banibash =

Banibash Банибаш
- Village
- Location within Bashkortostan Location within Russia
- Coordinates: 56°17′N 55°00′E
- Country: Russia
- Region: Bashkortostan
- District: Yanaulsky District
- Time zone: UTC+5:00

Banibash (Russian: Банибаш; Bashkir: Бәнибаш, Bänibaş) is a rural locality (a village) in Istyaksky Selsoviet, Yanaulsky District, Bashkortostan, Russia. The population was 150 as of 2010. There is 1 street.

== Geography ==
Banibash is located 10 km northeast of Yanaul (the district's administrative centre) by road. Istyak is the nearest rural locality.
