= Sandugach, Yanaulsky District, Republic of Bashkortostan =

Sandugach Сандугач
- Selo
- Location within Bashkortostan Location within Russia
- Coordinates: 56°15′N 55°11′E
- Country: Russia
- Region: Bashkortostan
- District: Yanaulsky District
- Time zone: UTC+5:00

Sandugach (Russian: Сандугач; Bashkir: Һандуғас, Handuğas) is a rural locality (a selo) and the administrative centre of Sandugachevsky Selsoviet, Yanaulsky District, Bashkortostan, Russia. The population was 431 as of 2010. There are 9 streets.

== Geography ==
Sandugach is located 19 km east of Yanaul (the district's administrative centre) by road. Barabanovka is the nearest rural locality.
