= Gudburovo =

Gudburovo Гудбурово
- Village
- Location within Bashkortostan Location within Russia
- Coordinates: 56°12′N 54°48′E
- Country: Russia
- Region: Bashkortostan
- District: Yanaulsky District
- Time zone: UTC+5:00

Gudburovo (Russian: Гудбурово; Bashkir: Гөтбөр, Götbör) is a rural locality (a village) in Bayguzinsky Selsoviet, Yanaulsky District, Bashkortostan, Russia. The population was 247 as of 2010. There are 2 streets.

== Geography ==
Gudburovo is located 12 km southwest of Yanaul (the district's administrative centre) by road. Urakayevo is the nearest rural locality.
