= Stary Kuyuk =

Stary Kuyuk Старый Куюк
- Selo
- Location within Bashkortostan Location within Russia
- Coordinates: 56°17′N 55°03′E
- Country: Russia
- Region: Bashkortostan
- District: Yanaulsky District
- Time zone: UTC+5:00

Stary Kuyuk (Russian: Старый Куюк; Bashkir: Иҫке Көйөк, İśke Köyök) is a rural locality (a selo) in Istyaksky Selsoviet, Yanaulsky District, Bashkortostan, Russia. The population was 246 as of 2010. There are 5 streets.

== Geography ==
Stary Kuyuk is located 10 km northeast of Yanaul (the district's administrative centre) by road. Istyak is the nearest rural locality.
