= Novaya Kirga =

Novaya Kirga Новая Кирга
- Village
- Location within Bashkortostan Location within Russia
- Coordinates: 56°17′N 55°09′E
- Country: Russia
- Region: Bashkortostan
- District: Yanaulsky District
- Time zone: UTC+5:00

Novaya Kirga (Russian: Новая Кирга; Bashkir: Яңы Кирге, Yañı Kirge) is a rural locality (a village) in Sandugachevsky Selsoviet, Yanaulsky District, Bashkortostan, Russia. The population was 51 as of 2010. There is 1 street.

== Geography ==
Novaya Kirga is located 24 km east of Yanaul (the district's administrative centre) by road. Barabanovka is the nearest rural locality.
