= Starokudashevo =

Starokudashevo Старокудашево
- Selo
- Location within Bashkortostan Location within Russia
- Coordinates: 56°07′N 54°41′E
- Country: Russia
- Region: Bashkortostan
- District: Yanaulsky District
- Time zone: UTC+5:00

Starokudashevo (Russian: Старокудашево; Bashkir: Иҫке Ҡоҙаш, İśke Qoźaş) is a rural locality (a selo) and the administrative centre of Starokudashevsky Selsoviet, Yanaulsky District, Bashkortostan, Russia. The population was 395 as of 2010. There are 7 streets.

== Geography ==
Starokudashevo is located 30 km southwest of Yanaul (the district's administrative centre) by road. Stary Oryebash is the nearest rural locality.
