= Yamady =

Yamady Ямады
- Selo
- Location within Bashkortostan Location within Russia
- Coordinates: 56°08′N 55°19′E
- Country: Russia
- Region: Bashkortostan
- District: Yanaulsky District
- Time zone: UTC+5:00

Yamady (Russian: Ямады; Bashkir: Ямаҙы, Yamaźı) is a rural locality (a selo) and the administrative centre of Yamadinsky Selsoviet, Yanaulsky District, Bashkortostan, Russia. The population was 482 as of 2010. There are 12 streets.

== Geography ==
Yamady is located 34 km southeast of Yanaul (the district's administrative centre) by road. Chetyrman is the nearest rural locality.
