= Stary Aldar =

Stary Aldar Старый Алдар
- Village
- Location within Bashkortostan Location within Russia
- Coordinates: 56°04′N 55°21′E
- Country: Russia
- Region: Bashkortostan
- District: Yanaulsky District
- Time zone: UTC+5:00

Stary Aldar (Russian: Старый Алдар; Bashkir: Иҫке Алдар, İśke Aldar) is a rural locality (a village) in Mesyagutovsky Selsoviet, Yanaulsky District, Bashkortostan, Russia. The population was 82 as of 2010. There is 1 street.

== Geography ==
Stary Aldar is located 44 km southeast of Yanaul (the district's administrative centre) by road. Mesyagutovo is the nearest rural locality.
