= Voyady =

Voyady Вояды
- Selo
- Location within Bashkortostan Location within Russia
- Coordinates: 56°22′N 54°38′E
- Country: Russia
- Region: Bashkortostan
- District: Yanaulsky District
- Time zone: UTC+5:00

Voyady (Russian: Вояды; Bashkir: Вояҙы, Woyaźı) is a rural locality (a selo) and the administrative centre of Voyadinsky Selsoviet, Yanaulsky District, Bashkortostan, Russia. The population was 395 as of 2010. There are 5 streets.

== Geography ==
Voyady is located 29 km northwest of Yanaul (the district's administrative centre) by road. Changakul is the nearest rural locality.
