= Arlyan =

Arlyan Арлян
- Village
- Location within Bashkortostan Location within Russia
- Coordinates: 56°15′N 55°06′E
- Country: Russia
- Region: Bashkortostan
- District: Yanaulsky District
- Time zone: UTC+5:00

Arlyan (Russian: Арлян; Bashkir: Әрлән, Ärlän) is a rural locality (a village) in Sandugachevsky Selsoviet, Yanaulsky District, Bashkortostan, Russia. The population was 93 as of 2010. There are 2 streets.

== Geography ==
Arlyan is located 13 km east of Yanaul (the district's administrative centre) by road. Sandugach is the nearest rural locality.
