= Izhboldino =

Izhboldino Ижболдино
- Selo
- Location within Bashkortostan Location within Russia
- Coordinates: 56°02′N 55°04′E
- Country: Russia
- Region: Bashkortostan
- District: Yanaulsky District
- Time zone: UTC+5:00

Izhboldino (Russian: Ижболдино; Bashkir: Ишбулды, İşbuldı) is a rural locality (a selo) and the administrative centre of Izhboldinsky Selsoviet, Yanaulsky District, Bashkortostan, Russia. The population was 348 as of 2010. There are 4 streets.

== Geography ==
Izhboldino is located 30 km south of Yanaul (the district's administrative centre) by road. Isanbayevo is the nearest rural locality.
