= Shmelkovka =

Shmelkovka Шмельковка
- Village
- Location within Bashkortostan Location within Russia
- Coordinates: 56°19′N 55°01′E
- Country: Russia
- Region: Bashkortostan
- District: Yanaulsky District
- Time zone: UTC+5:00

Shmelkovka (Russian: Шмельковка) is a rural locality (a village) in Istyaksky Selsoviet, Yanaulsky District, Bashkortostan, Russia. The population was 11 as of 2010. There is 1 street.

== Geography ==
Shmelkovka is located 15 km northeast of Yanaul (the district's administrative centre) by road. Stary Kuyuk is the nearest rural locality.
