= Badryash-Aktau =

Badryash-Aktau Бадряш-Актау
- Village
- Location within Bashkortostan Location within Russia
- Coordinates: 56°17′N 54°40′E
- Country: Russia
- Region: Bashkortostan
- District: Yanaulsky District
- Time zone: UTC+5:00

Badryash-Aktau (Russian: Бадряш-Актау; Bashkir: Бәҙрәш-Аҡтау, Bäźräş-Aqtaw) is a rural locality (a village) in Voyadinsky Selsoviet, Yanaulsky District, Bashkortostan, Russia. The population was 24 as of 2010. There is 1 street.

== Geography ==
Badryash-Aktau is located 43 km west of Yanaul (the district's administrative centre) by road. Oshya-Tau is the nearest rural locality.
