= Lekarstvenny =

Lekarstvenny Лекарственный
- Settlement
- Location within Voronezh Oblast Location within Russia
- Coordinates: 51°29′N 39°35′E
- Country: Russia
- Region: Voronezh Oblast
- District: Novousmansky District
- Time zone: UTC+3:00

Lekarstvenny (Russian: Лекарственный) is a rural locality (a settlement) in Rogachyovskoye Rural Settlement, Novousmansky District, Voronezh Oblast, Russia. The population was 323 as of 2010.

== Geography ==
By road, Lekarstvenny is located 24 km southeast of Novaya Usman (the district's administrative centre). Rogachyovka is the nearest rural locality.
