= Nanyady =

Nanyady Наняды
- Village
- Location within Bashkortostan Location within Russia
- Coordinates: 56°06′N 55°16′E
- Country: Russia
- Region: Bashkortostan
- District: Yanaulsky District
- Time zone: UTC+5:00

Nanyady (Russian: Наняды; Bashkir: Нәнәҙе, Nänäźe) is a rural locality (a village) in Starovaryashsky Selsoviet, Yanaulsky District, Bashkortostan, Russia. The population was 171 as of 2010. There are 4 streets.

== Geography ==
Nanyady is located 38 km southeast of Yanaul (the district's administrative centre) by road. Stary Varyash is the nearest rural locality.
