= Norkanovo =

Norkanovo Норканово
- Village
- Location within Bashkortostan Location within Russia
- Coordinates: 56°14′N 55°09′E
- Country: Russia
- Region: Bashkortostan
- District: Yanaulsky District
- Time zone: UTC+5:00

Norkanovo (Russian: Норканово; Bashkir: Норҡан, Norqan) is a rural locality (a village) in Sandugachevsky Selsoviet, Yanaulsky District, Bashkortostan, Russia. The population was 132 as of 2010. There are 2 streets.

== Geography ==
Norkanovo is located 19 km east of Yanaul (the district's administrative centre) by road. Sandugach is the nearest rural locality.
