= Itkineyevo =

Itkineyevo Иткинеево
- Selo
- Location within Bashkortostan Location within Russia
- Coordinates: 56°13′N 54°57′E
- Country: Russia
- Region: Bashkortostan
- District: Yanaulsky District
- Time zone: UTC+5:00

Itkineyevo (Russian: Иткинеево; Bashkir: Эткенә, Etkenä) is a rural locality (a selo) and the administrative centre of Itkineyevsky Selsoviet, Yanaulsky District, Bashkortostan, Russia. The population was 675 as of 2010. There are 10 streets.

== Geography ==
Itkineyevo is located 7 km south of Yanaul (the district's administrative centre) by road. Shudimari is the nearest rural locality.
