= Shudimari =

Shudimari Шудимари
- Village
- Location within Bashkortostan Location within Russia
- Coordinates: 56°11′N 54°59′E
- Country: Russia
- Region: Bashkortostan
- District: Yanaulsky District
- Time zone: UTC+5:00

Shudimari (Russian: Шудимари; Bashkir: Шудимари, Şudimari) is a rural locality (a village) in Itkineyevsky Selsoviet, Yanaulsky District, Bashkortostan, Russia. The population was 49 as of 2010. There is 1 street.

== Geography ==
Shudimari is located 10 km southeast of Yanaul (the district's administrative centre) by road. Itkineyevo is the nearest rural locality.
