= Irdugan =

Irdugan Ирдуган
- Village
- Location within Bashkortostan Location within Russia
- Coordinates: 56°10′N 54°53′E
- Country: Russia
- Region: Bashkortostan
- District: Yanaulsky District
- Time zone: UTC+5:00

Irdugan (Russian: Ирдуган; Bashkir: Ирдуған, İrduğan) is a rural locality (a village) in Pevomaysky Selsoviet, Yanaulsky District, Bashkortostan, Russia. The population was 221 as of 2010. There are 3 streets.

== Geography ==
Irdugan is located 14 km south of Yanaul (the district's administrative centre) by road. Andreyevka is the nearest rural locality.
