= Bulat-Yelga =

Bulat-Yelga Булат-Елга
- Village
- Location within Bashkortostan Location within Russia
- Coordinates: 56°20′N 54°45′E
- Country: Russia
- Region: Bashkortostan
- District: Yanaulsky District
- Time zone: UTC+5:00

Bulat-Yelga (Russian: Булат-Елга; Bashkir: Булатйылға, Bulatyılğa) is a rural locality (a village) in Novoartaulsky Selsoviet, Yanaulsky District, Bashkortostan, Russia. The population was 74 as of 2010. There are 2 streets.

== Geography ==
Bulat-Yelga is located 21 km northwest of Yanaul (the district's administrative centre) by road. Novy Artaul is the nearest rural locality.
