= Akhtiyal =

Akhtiyal Ахтиял
- Village
- Location within Bashkortostan Location within Russia
- Coordinates: 56°15′N 55°02′E
- Country: Russia
- Region: Bashkortostan
- District: Yanaulsky District
- Time zone: UTC+5:00

Akhtiyal (Russian: Ахтиял; Bashkir: Ахтиял, Axtiyal) is a rural locality (a village) in Istyaksky Selsoviet, Yanaulsky District, Bashkortostan, Russia. The population was 353 as of 2010. There are 4 streets.

== Geography ==
Akhtiyal is located 8 km southeast of Yanaul (the district's administrative centre) by road. Sabanchi is the nearest rural locality.
