= Tash-Yelga, Yanaulsky District, Republic of Bashkortostan =

Tash-Yelga Таш-Елга
- Village
- Location within Bashkortostan Location within Russia
- Coordinates: 56°19′N 54°57′E
- Country: Russia
- Region: Bashkortostan
- District: Yanaulsky District
- Time zone: UTC+5:00

Tash-Yelga (Russian: Таш-Елга; Bashkir: Ташйылға, Taşyılğa) is a rural locality (a village) in Novoartaulsky Selsoviet, Yanaulsky District, Bashkortostan, Russia. The population was 79 as of 2010. There are two streets.

== Geography ==
Tash-Yelga is located 9 km north of Yanaul (the district's administrative centre) by road. Tatarskaya Urada is the nearest rural locality.
