= Verkhny Chat =

Verkhny Chat Верхний Чат
- Selo
- Location within Bashkortostan Location within Russia
- Coordinates: 56°04′N 55°25′E
- Country: Russia
- Region: Bashkortostan
- District: Yanaulsky District
- Time zone: UTC+5:00

Verkhny Chat (Russian: Верхний Чат; Bashkir: Үрге Сат, Ürge Sat) is a rural locality (a selo) in Mesyagutovsky Selsoviet, Yanaulsky District, Bashkortostan, Russia. The population was 127 as of 2010. There are 5 streets.

== Geography ==
Verkhny Chat is located 45 km southeast of Yanaul (the district's administrative centre) by road. Nizhny Chat is the nearest rural locality.
