= Novaya Orya =

Novaya Orya Новая Орья
- Village
- Location within Bashkortostan Location within Russia
- Coordinates: 56°09′N 54°45′E
- Country: Russia
- Region: Bashkortostan
- District: Yanaulsky District
- Time zone: UTC+5:00

Novaya Orya (Russian: Новая Орья; Bashkir: Яңы Уръя, Yañı Urya) is a rural locality (a village) in Bayguzinsky Selsoviet, Yanaulsky District, Bashkortostan, Russia. The population was 149 as of 2010. There is 1 street.

== Geography ==
Novaya Orya is located 20 km southwest of Yanaul (the district's administrative centre) by road. Staraya Orya is the nearest rural locality.
