= Varyashbash =

Varyashbash Варяшбаш
- Village
- Location within Bashkortostan Location within Russia
- Coordinates: 56°22′N 54°50′E
- Country: Russia
- Region: Bashkortostan
- District: Yanaulsky District
- Time zone: UTC+5:00

Varyashbash (Russian: Варяшбаш; Bashkir: Вәрәшбаш, Wäräşbaş) is a rural locality (a village) in Novoartaulsky Selsoviet, Yanaulsky District, Bashkortostan, Russia. The population was 68 as of 2010. There is 1 street.

== Geography ==
Varyashbash is located 23 km north of Yanaul (the district's administrative centre) by road. Votskaya Oshya is the nearest rural locality.
