= Rabak, Republic of Bashkortostan =

Rabak Рабак
- Selo
- Location within Bashkortostan Location within Russia
- Coordinates: 56°19′N 55°14′E
- Country: Russia
- Region: Bashkortostan
- District: Yanaulsky District
- Time zone: UTC+5:00

Rabak (Bashkir and Russian: Рабак) is a rural locality (a selo) in Sandugachevsky Selsoviet, Yanaulsky District, Bashkortostan, Russia. The population was 366 as of 2010. There are 6 streets.

== Geography ==
Rabak is located 25 km northeast of Yanaul (the district's administrative centre) by road. Uchastok 3-go Goskonezavoda is the nearest rural locality.
