= Novy Artaul =

Novy Artaul Новый Артаул
- Selo
- Location within Bashkortostan Location within Russia
- Coordinates: 56°18′N 54°48′E
- Country: Russia
- Region: Bashkortostan
- District: Yanaulsky District
- Time zone: UTC+5:00

Novy Artaul (Russian: Новый Артаул; Bashkir: Яңы Артауыл, Yañı Artawıl) is a rural locality (a selo) and the administrative centre of Novoartaulsky Selsoviet, Yanaulsky District, Bashkortostan, Russia. The population was 881 as of 2010. There are 8 streets.

== Geography ==
Novy Artaul is located 17 km northwest of Yanaul (the district's administrative centre) by road. Varyash is the nearest rural locality.
