= Votskaya Oshya =

Votskaya Oshya Вотская Ошья
- Selo
- Location within Bashkortostan Location within Russia
- Coordinates: 56°24′N 54°46′E
- Country: Russia
- Region: Bashkortostan
- District: Yanaulsky District
- Time zone: UTC+5:00

Votskaya Oshya (Russian: Вотская Ошья; Bashkir: Вотяк Ушъяҙы, Votyak Uşyaźı) is a rural locality (a selo) in Novoartaulsky Selsoviet, Yanaulsky District, Bashkortostan, Russia. The population was 135 as of 2010. There are 3 streets.

== Geography ==
Votskaya Oshya is located 27 km northwest of Yanaul (the district's administrative centre) by road. Varyashbash is the nearest rural locality.
