= Oshya-Tau =

Oshya-Tau Ошья-Тау
- Village
- Location within Bashkortostan Location within Russia
- Coordinates: 56°17′N 54°44′E
- Country: Russia
- Region: Bashkortostan
- District: Yanaulsky District
- Time zone: UTC+5:00

Oshya-Tau (Russian: Ошья-Тау; Bashkir: Ушъятау, Uşyataw) is a rural locality (a village) in Novoartaulsky Selsoviet, Yanaulsky District, Bashkortostan, Russia. The population was 19 as of 2010. There is 1 street.

== Geography ==
Oshya-Tau is located 23 km northwest of Yanaul (the district's administrative centre) by road. Novy Artaul is the nearest rural locality.
