= Sultyevo =

Sultyevo Султыево
- Village
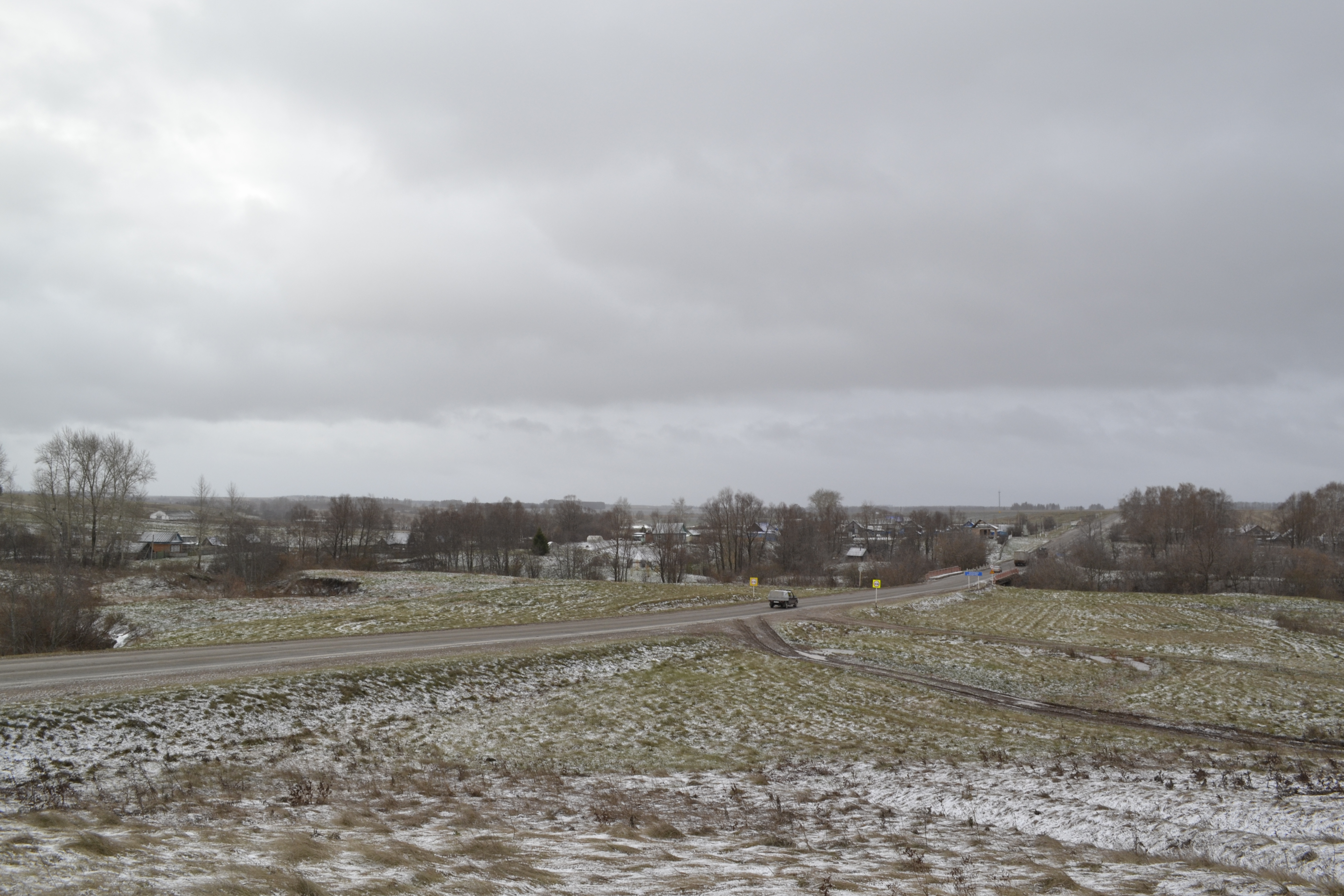

- Location within Bashkortostan Location within Russia
- Coordinates: 56°11′N 54°38′E
- Country: Russia
- Region: Bashkortostan
- District: Yanaulsky District
- Time zone: UTC+5:00

Sultyevo (Russian: Султыево; Bashkir: Султый, Sultıy) is a rural locality (a village) in Starokudashevsky Selsoviet, Yanaulsky District, Bashkortostan, Russia. The population was 68 as of 2010. There are 3 streets.

== Geography ==
Sultyevo is located 22 km southwest of Yanaul (the district's administrative centre) by road. Yanbaris is the nearest rural locality.
