= Volya, Novousmansky District, Voronezh Oblast =

Volya Воля
- Settlement
- Location within Voronezh Oblast Location within Russia
- Coordinates: 51°45′N 39°30′E
- Country: Russia
- Region: Voronezh Oblast
- District: Novousmansky District
- Time zone: UTC+3:00

Volya (Russian: Воля) is a rural locality (a settlement) and the administrative center of Volenskoye Rural Settlement, Novousmansky District, Voronezh Oblast, Russia. The population was 7,897 (2021 census); 7,803 as of 2010. There are 44 streets.

== Geography ==
Volya is located 17 km northeast of Novaya Usman (the district's administrative centre) by road. Orlovo is the nearest rural locality.
