= Kush-Imyan =

Kush-Imyan Куш-Имян
- Village
- Location within Bashkortostan Location within Russia
- Coordinates: 56°01′N 55°26′E
- Country: Russia
- Region: Bashkortostan
- District: Yanaulsky District
- Time zone: UTC+5:00

Kush-Imyan (Russian: Куш-Имян; Bashkir: Ҡушимән, Quşimän) is a rural locality (a village) in Mesyagutovsky Selsoviet, Yanaulsky District, Bashkortostan, Russia. The population was 3 as of 2010. There is 1 street.

== Geography ==
Kush-Imyan is located 50 km southeast of Yanaul (the district's administrative centre) by road. Teplyaki is the nearest rural locality.
