= Aybulyak =

Aybulyak Айбуляк
- Selo
- Location within Bashkortostan Location within Russia
- Coordinates: 56°12′N 54°43′E
- Country: Russia
- Region: Bashkortostan
- District: Yanaulsky District
- Time zone: UTC+5:00

Aybulyak (Russian: Айбуляк; Bashkir: Айбүләк, Aybüläk) is a rural locality (a selo) in Bayguzinsky Selsoviet, Yanaulsky District, Bashkortostan, Russia. The population was 285 as of 2010. There are 5 streets.

== Geography ==
Aybulyak is located 16 km southwest of Yanaul (the district's administrative centre) by road. Progress is the nearest rural locality.
