= Igrovka =

Igrovka Игровка
- Village
- Location within Bashkortostan Location within Russia
- Coordinates: 56°07′N 55°08′E
- Country: Russia
- Region: Bashkortostan
- District: Yanaulsky District
- Time zone: UTC+5:00

Igrovka (Russian: Игровка) is a rural locality (a village) in Orlovsky Selsoviet, Yanaulsky District, Bashkortostan, Russia. The population was 80 as of 2010. There is 1 street.

== Geography ==
Igrovka is located 23 km southeast of Yanaul (the district's administrative centre) by road. Nikolsk is the nearest rural locality.
