= Staraya Orya =

Staraya Orya Старая Орья
- Village
- Location within Bashkortostan Location within Russia
- Coordinates: 56°09′N 54°44′E
- Country: Russia
- Region: Bashkortostan
- District: Yanaulsky District
- Time zone: UTC+5:00

Staraya Orya (Russian: Старая Орья; Bashkir: Иҫке Уръя, İśke Urya) is a rural locality (a village) in Bayguzinsky Selsoviet, Yanaulsky District, Bashkortostan, Russia. The population was 89 as of 2010. There are 2 streets.

== Geography ==
Staraya Orya is located 21 km southwest of Yanaul (the district's administrative centre) by road. Novaya Orya is the nearest rural locality.
