= Kumovo =

Kumovo Кумово
- Selo
- Location within Bashkortostan Location within Russia
- Coordinates: 56°12′N 54°23′E
- Country: Russia
- Region: Bashkortostan
- District: Yanaulsky District
- Time zone: UTC+5:00

Kumovo (Russian: Кумово; Bashkir: Ҡом, Qom) is a rural locality (a selo) in Karmanovsky Selsoviet, Yanaulsky District, Bashkortostan, Russia.

== Population ==
The population was 268 as of 2010. There are 10 streets.

== Geography ==
Kumovo is located 47 km southwest of Yanaul (the district's administrative centre) by road. Amzya is the nearest rural locality.
