= Yambayevo =

Yambayevo Ямбаево
- Selo
- Location within Bashkortostan Location within Russia
- Coordinates: 56°11′N 54°41′E
- Country: Russia
- Region: Bashkortostan
- District: Yanaulsky District
- Time zone: UTC+5:00

Yambayevo (Russian: Ямбаево; Bashkir: Ямбай, Yambay) is a rural locality (a selo) in Bayguzinsky Selsoviet, Yanaulsky District, Bashkortostan, Russia. The population was 124 as of 2010. There are 2 streets.

== Geography ==
Yambayevo is located 20 km southwest of Yanaul (the district's administrative centre) by road. Kumalak is the nearest rural locality.
