= Kisak-Kain =

Kisak-Kain Кисак-Каин
- Selo
- Location within Bashkortostan Location within Russia
- Coordinates: 56°13′N 53°38′E
- Country: Russia
- Region: Bashkortostan
- District: Yanaulsky District
- Time zone: UTC+5:00

Kisak-Kain (Russian: Кисак-Каин; Bashkir: Киҫәкҡайын, Kiśäkqayın) is a rural locality (a selo) and the administrative centre of Kisak-Kainsky Selsoviet, Yanaulsky District, Bashkortostan, Russia. The population was 519 as of 2010. There are 5 streets.

== Geography ==
Kisak-Kain is located 25 km southwest of Yanaul (the district's administrative centre) by road. Tartar is the nearest rural locality.
