= Tartar, Yanaulsky District, Republic of Bashkortostan =

Tartar Тартар
- Village
- Location within Bashkortostan Location within Russia
- Coordinates: 56°13′N 54°39′E
- Country: Russia
- Region: Bashkortostan
- District: Yanaulsky District
- Time zone: UTC+5:00

Tartar (Bashkir and Russian: Тартар) is a rural locality (a village) in Kisak-Kainsky Selsoviet, Yanaulsky District, Bashkortostan, Russia. The population was 117 as of 2010. There is 1 street.

== Geography ==
Tartar is located 25 km southwest of Yanaul (the district's administrative centre) by road. Kisak-Kain is the nearest rural locality.
