= Novy Varyash =

Novy Varyash Новый Варяш
- Village
- Location within Bashkortostan Location within Russia
- Coordinates: 56°05′N 55°13′E
- Country: Russia
- Region: Bashkortostan
- District: Yanaulsky District
- Time zone: UTC+5:00

Novy Varyash (Russian: Новый Варяш; Bashkir: Яңы Вәрәш, Yañı Wäräş) is a rural locality (a village) in Starovaryashsky Selsoviet, Yanaulsky District, Bashkortostan, Russia. The population was 96 as of 2010. There is 1 street.

== Geography ==
Novy Varyash is located 44 km southeast of Yanaul (the district's administrative centre) by road. Stary Varyash is the nearest rural locality.
