= Nizhny Chat =

Nizhny Chat Нижний Чат
- Village
- Location within Bashkortostan Location within Russia
- Coordinates: 56°05′N 55°24′E
- Country: Russia
- Region: Bashkortostan
- District: Yanaulsky District
- Time zone: UTC+5:00

Nizhny Chat (Russian: Нижний Чат; Bashkir: Түбәнге Сат, Tübänge Sat) is a rural locality (a village) in Mesyagutovsky Selsoviet, Yanaulsky District, Bashkortostan, Russia. The population was 219 as of 2010. There are 4 streets.

== Geography ==
Nizhny Chat is located 44 km southeast of Yanaul (the district's administrative centre) by road. Verkhny Chat is the nearest rural locality.
