= Babyakovo =

Babyakovo Бабяково
- Selo
- Location within Voronezh Oblast Location within Russia
- Coordinates: 51°41′N 39°22′E
- Country: Russia
- Region: Voronezh Oblast
- District: Novousmansky District
- Time zone: UTC+3:00

Babyakovo (Russian: Бабяково) is a rural locality (a selo) and the administrative center of Babyakovskoye Rural Settlement, Novousmansky District, Voronezh Oblast, Russia. The population was 3,311 (2021 census); 2,678 as of 2010. There are 44 streets.

== Geography ==
Babyakovo is located 9 km northwest of Novaya Usman (the district's administrative centre) by road. Zerkalny is the nearest rural locality.
