= Shudek =

Shudek Шудек
- Selo
- Location within Bashkortostan Location within Russia
- Coordinates: 56°14′N 54°52′E
- Country: Russia
- Region: Bashkortostan
- District: Yanaulsky District
- Time zone: UTC+5:00

Shudek (Russian: Шудек; Bashkir: Шудек, Şudek) is a rural locality (a selo) and the administrative centre of Shudeksky Selsoviet, Yanaulsky District, Bashkortostan, Russia. The population was 525 as of 2010. There are 8 streets.

== Geography ==
Shudek is located 6 km southwest of Yanaul (the district's administrative centre) by road. Yanaul is the nearest rural locality.
