= Budya Varyash =

Budya Varyash Будья Варяш
- Village
- Location within Bashkortostan Location within Russia
- Coordinates: 56°04′N 55°16′E
- Country: Russia
- Region: Bashkortostan
- District: Yanaulsky District
- Time zone: UTC+5:00

Budya Varyash (Russian: Будья Варяш; Bashkir: Будья Вәрәш, Budya Wäräş) is a rural locality (a village) in Starovaryashsky Selsoviet, Yanaulsky District, Bashkortostan, Russia. The population was 166 as of 2010. There are 3 streets.

== Geography ==
Budya Varyash is located 41 km southeast of Yanaul (the district's administrative centre) by road. Stary Varyash is the nearest rural locality.
