= Maximovo =

Maximovo Максимово
- Selo
- Location within Bashkortostan Location within Russia
- Coordinates: 56°14′N 55°18′E
- Country: Russia
- Region: Bashkortostan
- District: Yanaulsky District
- Time zone: UTC+5:00

Maximovo (Russian: Максимово) is a rural locality (a selo) and the administrative centre of Maximovsky Selsoviet, Yanaulsky District, Bashkortostan, Russia. The population was 590 as of 2010. There are 10 streets.

== Geography ==
Maximovo is located 27 km east of Yanaul (the district's administrative centre) by road. Zirka is the nearest rural locality.
