= Karmanovo (selo), Yanaulsky District, Republic of Bashkortostan =

Karmanovo Карманово
- Selo
- Location within Bashkortostan Location within Russia
- Coordinates: 56°13′N 54°32′E
- Country: Russia
- Region: Bashkortostan
- District: Yanaulsky District
- Time zone: UTC+5:00

Karmanovo (Russian: Карманово; Bashkir: Ҡарман, Qarman) is a rural locality (a selo) and the administrative centre of Karmanovsky Selsoviet, Yanaulsky District, Bashkortostan, Russia. The population was 1,251 as of 2010. There are 30 streets.

== Geography ==
Karmanovo is located 29 km west of Yanaul (the district's administrative centre) by road. Karmanovo (village) is the nearest rural locality.
