= Tau, Yanaulsky District, Republic of Bashkortostan =

Tau Тау
- Village
- Location within Bashkortostan Location within Russia
- Coordinates: 56°06′N 55°23′E
- Country: Russia
- Region: Bashkortostan
- District: Yanaulsky District
- Time zone: UTC+5:00

Tau (Russian: Тау; Bashkir: Тау, Taw) is a rural locality (a village) in Mesyagutovsky Selsoviet, Yanaulsky District, Bashkortostan, Russia. The population was 194 as of 2010. There are 4 streets.

== Geography ==
Tau is located 42 km southeast of Yanaul (the district's administrative centre) by road. Mesyagutovo is the nearest rural locality.
