= Novy Kuyuk =

Novy Kuyuk Новый Куюк
- Village
- Location within Bashkortostan Location within Russia
- Coordinates: 56°20′N 55°07′E
- Country: Russia
- Region: Bashkortostan
- District: Yanaulsky District
- Time zone: UTC+5:00

Novy Kuyuk (Russian: Новый Куюк; Bashkir: Яңы Көйөк, Yañı Köyök) is a rural locality (a village) in Istyaksky Selsoviet, Yanaulsky District, Bashkortostan, Russia. The population was 2 as of 2010. There is 1 street.

== Geography ==
Novy Kuyuk is located 43 km northeast of Yanaul (the district's administrative centre) by road. Kirga is the nearest rural locality.
