= Yussukovo =

Yussukovo Юссуково
- Selo
- Location within Bashkortostan Location within Russia
- Coordinates: 56°11′N 55°09′E
- Country: Russia
- Region: Bashkortostan
- District: Yanaulsky District
- Time zone: UTC+5:00

Yussukovo (Russian: Юссуково; Bashkir: Юсыҡ, Yusıq) is a rural locality (a selo) in Asavdybashsky Selsoviet, Yanaulsky District, Bashkortostan, Russia. The population was 183 as of 2010. There are 3 streets.

== Geography ==
Yussukovo is located 26 km southeast of Yanaul (the district's administrative centre) by road. Asavdybash is the nearest rural locality.
