= Andreyevka, Novousmansky District, Voronezh Oblast =

Andreyevka Андреевка
- Settlement
- Location within Voronezh Oblast Location within Russia
- Coordinates: 51°46′N 39°44′E
- Country: Russia
- Region: Voronezh Oblast
- District: Novousmansky District
- Time zone: UTC+3:00

Andreyevka (Russian: Андреевка) is a rural locality (a settlement) in Trudovskoye Rural Settlement, Novousmansky District, Voronezh Oblast, Russia. The population was 81 as of 2010. There are 4 streets.

== Geography ==
Andreyevka is located 32 km northeast of Novaya Usman (the district's administrative centre) by road. Makarye is the nearest rural locality.
