= Israel Benjamin Levner =

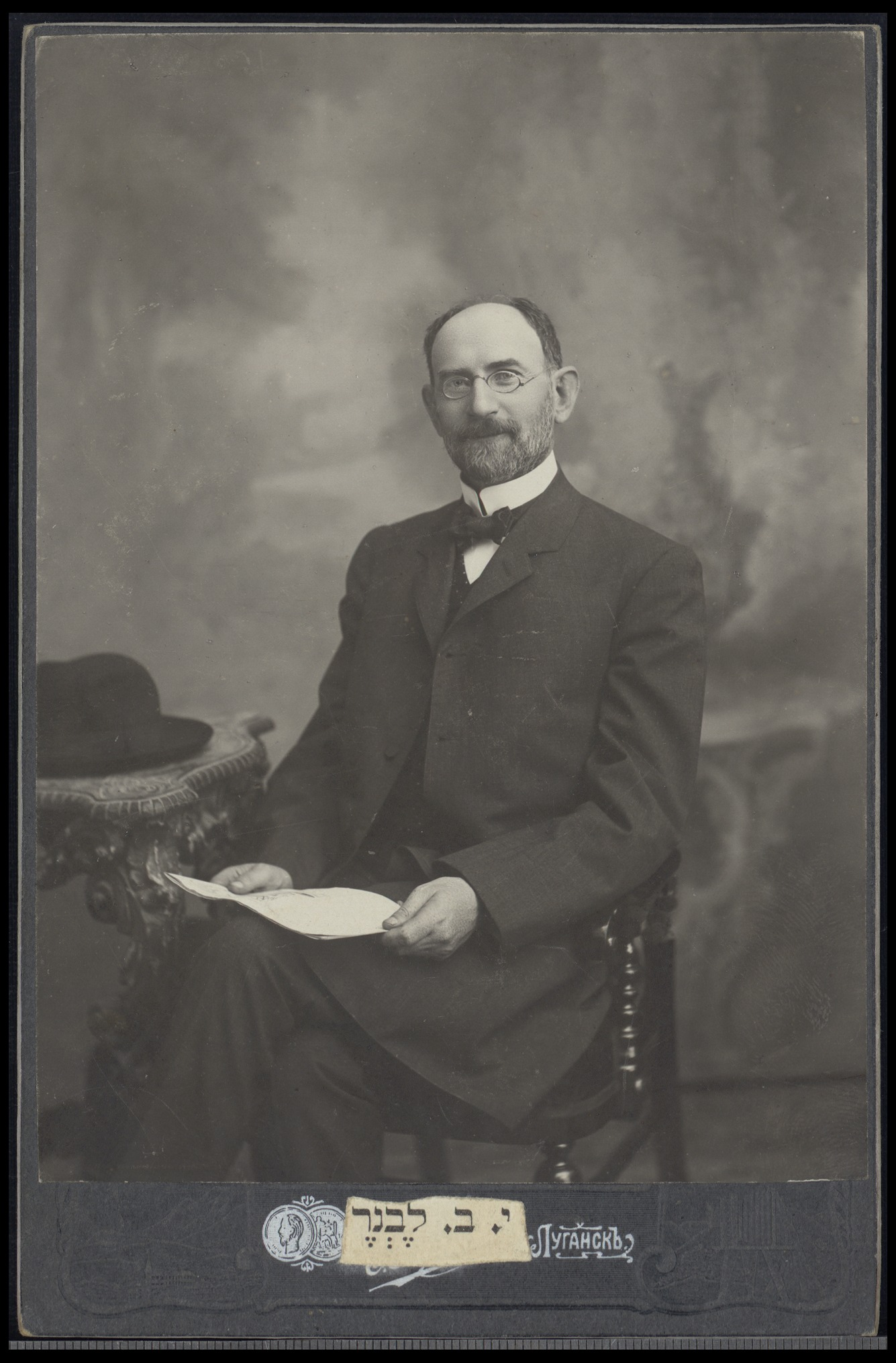
- Born: August 1862; Trudolyubovka, Yekaterinoslav Governorate, Russian Empire
- Died: December 1916 (aged 54)
- Writing career
- Language: Hebrew
- Notable work: Kol aggadot Yisrael (1895)

Israel Benjamin Levner (Hebrew: ישראל בנימין לֶבְנֶר, Russian: Израиль Беньямин Левнер; August 1862 – December 1916) was a Hebrew writer and translator. He is best known for his literature for children.

== Selected bibliography ==
- Reʻa ha-yeladim: ḥubar le-toʻelet yalde Yisraʼel. Yekaterinoslav: Kh. G. Fishkina. 1895.
- Kol aggadot Yisrael [All the Jewish Legends]. Pietrkov: Hotsaʾat Tushiyah. 1898 [1895]. Translated into English as The Legends of Israel (J. Clarke, 1946).
- Cooper, James Fenimore (1896). Ha-Mohikani ha-aharon [The Last of the Mohicans]. Li-vene ha-neʻurim ;2 ;Li-neʻurim ;6-10. Warsaw: Ha-aḥim Shuldberg ve-shutafam. hdl:2027/hvd.hwmr3a.
- Tzeḥok sefatayim: sipur agadah le-yeladim. Warsaw: Hotsaʾat Tushiyah. 1903.
- Siḥat shnei shivrei zekhukhit. Warsaw: Hotsaʾat Tushiyah. 1904.
- Shulḥan Arukh: dine Yisraʼel u-minhagav le-khol yeme ha-shanah. Vilna: Rozenkrantz & Shriftzetzfer. 1906. hdl:2027/hvd.hwmhar.
- Ein Ya'akov. Warsaw: Hotsaʾat Tushiyah. 1909. hdl:2027/ien.35556036275345.
- Bar-Kokhba: sipur histori mi-yeme harisut Betar. Warsaw: Tzentral. 1923.
