= Andriivka =

Andriivka or Andriyivka (Ukrainian: Андріївка) may refer to several places in Ukraine:

== Chernihiv Oblast ==
- Andriivka, Chernihiv Raion, Chernihiv Oblast

== Donetsk Oblast ==
- Andriivka, Bakhmut Raion, Donetsk Oblast
- Andriivka, Horlivka Raion, Donetsk Oblast
- Andriivka (village), Kramatorsk Raion, Donetsk Oblast
- Andriivka, Myrne settlement hromada, Volnovakha Raion, Donetsk Oblast
- Andriivka, Velyka Novosilka settlement hromada, Volnovakha Raion, Donetsk Oblast
- The former name of Sukhanivka, Donetsk Oblast

== Lviv Oblast ==
- Andriivka, Chervonohrad Raion, Lviv Oblast
- Andriivka, Zolochiv Raion, Lviv Oblast

== Poltava Oblast ==
- Andriivka, Lubny Raion, Poltava Oblast
- Andriivka, Dykanka settlement hromada, Poltava Raion, Poltava Oblast
- Andriivka, Khorol urban hromada, Poltava Raion, Poltava Oblast
- Andriivka, Mykhailivka rural hromada, Poltava Raion, Poltava Oblast
- Andriivka, Nekhvoroshcha rural hromada, Poltava Raion, Poltava Oblast
- Andriivka, Poltava urban hromada, Poltava Raion, Poltava Oblast

== Sumy Oblast ==
- Andriivka, Sumy Raion, Sumy Oblast
- Andriivka, Romny Raion, Sumy Oblast

== Other ==
- Andriivka, Kharkiv Oblast (Izium Raion)
- Andriivka, Beryslav Raion, Kherson Oblast
- Andriivka, Vyshhorod Raion, Kyiv Oblast

== See also ==
- Andreyevka (disambiguation), places in Russia with the equivalent Russian name
