= Krylovka =

Krylovka may refer to:

Places in Russia

- Krylovka, Russia, name of several rural localities in Russia

Places in Ukraine

- Krylovka, Pervomayske Raion, Crimea
- Krylovka, Saky Raion, Crimea
- Krylovka, Andrushivka Raion, Zhytomyr Oblast
- Krylovka, Ruzhyn Raion, Zhytomyr Oblast

== See also ==
- Raditsa-Krylovka
