= Trudolyubovka =

Trudolyubovka Трудолюбовка
- Selo
- Location within Voronezh Oblast Location within Russia
- Coordinates: 51°39′N 39°53′E
- Country: Russia
- Region: Voronezh Oblast
- District: Novousmansky District
- Time zone: UTC+3:00

Trudolyubovka (Russian: Трудолюбовка) is a rural locality (a selo) in Nizhnekatukhovskoye Rural Settlement, Novousmansky District, Voronezh Oblast, Russia. The population was 101 as of 2010. There are 4 streets.

== Geography ==
Trudolyubovka is located 37 km east of Novaya Usman (the district's administrative centre) by road. Nizhnyaya Katukhovka is the nearest rural locality.
