= Krylovka, Voronezh Oblast =

Krylovka Крыловка
- Selo
- Location within Voronezh Oblast Location within Russia
- Coordinates: 51°31′N 39°39′E
- Country: Russia
- Region: Voronezh Oblast
- District: Novousmansky District
- Time zone: UTC+3:00

Krylovka (Russian: Крыловка) is a rural locality (a selo) in Timiryazevskoye Rural Settlement, Novousmansky District, Voronezh Oblast, Russia. The population was 161 as of 2010. There are 4 streets.

== Geography ==
Krylovka is located 34 km southeast of Novaya Usman (the district's administrative centre) by road. Mikhaylovka is the nearest rural locality.
