= Krylovka, Russia =

Krylovka (Russian: Крыловка) is the name of several rural localities (settlements, selos, and villages) in Russia:

- Krylovka, Kaliningrad Oblast, a settlement in Divny Rural Okrug of Baltiysky District of Kaliningrad Oblast
- Krylovka, Kursk Oblast, a settlement in Sovetsky Selsoviet of Sovetsky District of Kursk Oblast
- Krylovka, Novosibirsk Oblast, a settlement in Karasuksky District of Novosibirsk Oblast
- Krylovka, Orsk, Orenburg Oblast, a selo in Krylovsky Selsoviet of the city of Orsk, Orenburg Oblast
- Krylovka, Totsky District, Orenburg Oblast, a settlement in Zadorozhny Selsoviet of Totsky District of Orenburg Oblast
- Krylovka, Penza Oblast, a selo in Mezhdurechensky Selsoviet of Kamensky District of Penza Oblast
- Krylovka, Primorsky Krai, a selo in Kirovsky District of Primorsky Krai
- Krylovka, Ryazan Oblast, a village in Adelinsky Rural Okrug of Shilovsky District of Ryazan Oblast
- Krylovka, Samara Oblast, a settlement in Chelno-Vershinsky District of Samara Oblast
- Krylovka, Bakcharsky District, Tomsk Oblast, a village in Bakcharsky District, Tomsk Oblast
- Krylovka, Krivosheinsky District, Tomsk Oblast, a village in Krivosheinsky District, Tomsk Oblast
- Krylovka, Voronezh Oblast, a selo in Timiryazevskoye Rural Settlement of Novousmansky District of Voronezh Oblast
