= Kargino =

Village in Mishkinsky District, Bashkortostan, Russia

Kargino Каргино
- Village
- Location within Bashkortostan Location within Russia
- Coordinates: 55°35′N 55°41′E
- Country: Russia
- Region: Bashkortostan
- District: Mishkinsky District
- Time zone: UTC+5:00

Kargino (Russian: Каргино; Bashkir: Ҡарға, Qarğa; Meadow Mari: Коракъял, Korakjal) is a rural locality (a village) in Kayrakovsky Selsoviet, Mishkinsky District, Bashkortostan, Russia. The population was 556 as of 2010. There are 6 streets.

== Geography ==
Kargino is located 27 km northwest of Mishkino (the district's administrative centre) by road. Andreyevka is the nearest rural locality.
