= Andreyevka, Pervomaysky Selsoviet, Yanaulsky District, Republic of Bashkortostan =

Andreyevka Андреевка
- Village
- Location within Bashkortostan Location within Russia
- Coordinates: 56°09′N 54°51′E
- Country: Russia
- Region: Bashkortostan
- District: Yanaulsky District

Population (2010)
  - Total: 25
- Time zone: UTC+5:00

Andreyevka (Russian: Андреевка) is a rural locality (a village) in Yanaulsky District, Bashkortostan, Russia. The population was 25 as of 2010.
