= Andreyevka, Birsky District, Republic of Bashkortostan =

Andreyevka Андреевка
- Village
- Location within Bashkortostan Location within Russia
- Coordinates: 55°22′N 55°15′E
- Country: Russia
- Region: Bashkortostan
- District: Birsky District
- Time zone: UTC+5:00

Andreyevka (Russian: Андреевка) is a rural locality (a village) in Kusekeyevsky Selsoviet, Birsky District, Bashkortostan, Russia. The population was 2 as of 2010. There is 1 street.

== Geography ==
Andreyevka is located 44 km west of Birsk (the district's administrative centre) by road. Novourtayevo is the nearest rural locality.
