= Kurmanayevka =

Rural locality in Kurmanayevsky District, Orenburg Oblast, Russia

Coordinates: 52°30′29″N 52°03′45″E

Kurmanayevka (Russian: Курманаевка) is a rural locality (a selo) and the administrative center of Kurmanayevsky District, Orenburg Oblast, Russia. Population: 4,313 (2010 census); 4,577 (2002 census); 4,584 (1989 Soviet census).
