= Andreyevka, Yamandinsky Selsoviet, Yanaulsky District, Republic of Bashkortostan =

Andreyevka Андреевка
- Selo
- Location within Bashkortostan Location within Russia
- Coordinates: 56°10′N 55°21′E
- Country: Russia
- Region: Bashkortostan
- District: Yanaulsky District
- Time zone: UTC+5:00

Andreyevka (Russian: Андреевка) is a rural locality (a selo) in Yamadinsky Selsoviet, Yanaulsky District, Bashkortostan, Russia. The population was 357 as of 2010.

== Geography ==
It is located 37 km from Yanaul, 3 km from Yamady.
