= Andreyevka, Prokhorovsky District, Belgorod Oblast =

Andreyevka Андреевка
- Selo
- Location within Belgorod Oblast Location within Russia
- Coordinates: 51°01′N 37°08′E
- Country: Russia
- Region: Belgorod Oblast
- District: Prokhorovsky District
- Time zone: UTC+3:00

Andreyevka (Russian: Андреевка) is a rural locality (a selo) in Prokhorovsky District, Belgorod Oblast, Russia. The population was 50 as of 2010. There is 1 street.

== Geography ==
Andreyevka is located 32 km east of Prokhorovka (the district's administrative centre) by road. Studyony is the nearest rural locality.
