= Andreyevka, Selivanovsky District, Vladimir Oblast =

Andreyevka Андреевка
- Village
- Location within Vladimir Oblast Location within Russia
- Coordinates: 55°50′N 41°45′E
- Country: Russia
- Region: Vladimir Oblast
- District: Selivanovsky District
- Time zone: UTC+3:00

Andreyevka (Russian: Андреевка) is a rural locality (a village) in Novlyanskoye Rural Settlement, Selivanovsky District, Vladimir Oblast, Russia. The population was 84 as of 2010.

== Geography ==
Andreyevka is located 3 km southwest of Krasnaya Gorbatka (the district's administrative centre) by road. Krasnaya Gorka is the nearest rural locality.
