= Andreyevka, Kovrovsky District, Vladimir Oblast =

Andreyevka Андреевка
- Village
- Location within Vladimir Oblast Location within Russia
- Coordinates: 56°23′N 41°28′E
- Country: Russia
- Region: Vladimir Oblast
- District: Kovrovsky District
- Time zone: UTC+3:00

Andreyevka (Russian: Андреевка) is a rural locality (a village) in Klyazminskoye Rural Settlement, Kovrovsky District, Vladimir Oblast, Russia. The population was 17 as of 2010.

== Geography ==
Andreyevka is located 16 km east of Kovrov (the district's administrative centre) by road. Dostizheniye is the nearest rural locality.
