= Andriivka, Mykhailivka rural hromada, Poltava Raion, Poltava Oblast =

Village in Poltava Oblast, Ukraine

Andriivka Андріївка
- Village
- Location in Ukraine Andriivka (Poltava Oblast)
- Coordinates: 49°22′N 34°53′E
- Country: Ukraine
- Oblast: Poltava Oblast
- Raion: Poltava Raion
- Hromada: Mykhailivka rural hromada
- Village founded: 1765

Area
  - Total: 1.165 km^{2} (0.450 sq mi)

Population (2001)
  - Total: 578
  - Density: 496.14/km^{2} (1,285.0/sq mi)
- Time zone: UTC+2 (EET)
  - Summer (DST): UTC+3 (EEST)
- Postal code: 39442
- Area code: +380 5364

Andriivka (Ukrainian: Андріївка) is a village in the Poltava Raion, Poltava Oblast, Ukraine. It belongs to Mykhailivka rural hromada, one of the hromadas of Ukraine.

Andriivka was previously located in Mashivka Raion until it was abolished and its territory was merged into Poltava Raion on 18 July 2020 as part of the administrative reform of Ukraine, which reduced the number of raions of Poltava Oblast to four.
