= Andreyevka, Blagoveshchensky District, Republic of Bashkortostan =

Andreyevka Андреевка
- Village
- Location within Bashkortostan Location within Russia
- Coordinates: 55°04′N 55°46′E
- Country: Russia
- Region: Bashkortostan
- District: Blagoveshchensky District
- Time zone: UTC+5:00

Andreyevka (Russian: Андреевка) is a rural locality (a village) in Nikolayevsky Selsoviet, Blagoveshchensky District, Bashkortostan, Russia. The population was 33 as of 2010. There are 7 streets.

== Geography ==
Andreyevka is located 19 km northeast of Blagoveshchensk (the district's administrative centre) by road. Kurech is the nearest rural locality.
