= Andreyevka, Volgograd Oblast =

Andreyevka Андреевка
- Selo
- Location within Volgograd Oblast Location within Russia
- Coordinates: 50°58′N 44°42′E
- Country: Russia
- Region: Volgograd Oblast
- District: Zhirnovsky District
- Time zone: UTC+4:00

Andreyevka (Russian: Андреевка) is a rural locality (a selo) in Alexandrovskoye Rural Settlement, Zhirnovsky District, Volgograd Oblast, Russia. The population was 427 as of 2010. There are 5 streets.

== Geography ==
Andreyevka is located in steppe, on Khopyorsko-Buzulukskaya Plain, 10 km west of Zhirnovsk (the district's administrative centre) by road. Zhirnovsk is the nearest rural locality.
