= Andreyevka, Amur Oblast =

Andreyevka Андреевка
- Selo
- Location within Amur Oblast Location within Russia
- Coordinates: 50°17′N 128°14′E
- Country: Russia
- Region: Amur Oblast
- District: Ivanovsky District
- Time zone: UTC+9:00

Andreyevka (Russian: Андреевка) is a rural locality (a selo) and the administrative center of Andreyevsky Selsoviet of Ivanovsky District, Amur Oblast, Russia. The population was 238 as of 2018. There are 4 streets.

== Geography ==
Andreyevka is located on the left bank of the Manchzhurka River, 22 km southeast of Ivanovka (the district's administrative centre) by road. Pravovostochnoye is the nearest rural locality.
