= Andreyevka (Bagansky District) =

Village in Novosibirsk Oblast, Russia

Andreyevka Андреевка
- Location within Novosibirsk Oblast Location within Russia
- Coordinates: 53°50′35″N 77°26′47″E
- Country: Russia
- Region: Novosibirsk Oblast
- District: Bagansky District
- Village Council: Andreyevsky Village Council
- Time zone: UTC+7:00
- Postcode: 632791

Andreyevka (Russian: Андреевка) is a rural locality (a selo). It is the administrative center of the Andreyevsky Village Council of Bagansky District, Novosibirsk Oblast, Russia. Population: 613 (2010 census); 691 (2002 census);
