= Andreyevka, Nizhnedevitsky District, Voronezh Oblast =

Andreyevka Андреевка
- Selo
- Location within Voronezh Oblast Location within Russia
- Coordinates: 51°41′N 38°32′E
- Country: Russia
- Region: Voronezh Oblast
- District: Nizhnedevitsky District
- Time zone: UTC+3:00

Andreyevka (Russian: Андреевка) is a rural locality (a selo) and the administrative center of Andreyevskoye Rural Settlement, Nizhnedevitsky District, Voronezh Oblast, Russia. The population was 360 as of 2010. There are 11 streets.

== Geography ==
Andreyevka is located 38 km northeast of Nizhnedevitsk (the district's administrative centre) by road. Izbishche is the nearest rural locality.
