= Novourtayevo =

Novourtayevo Новоуртаево
- Village
- Location within Bashkortostan Location within Russia
- Coordinates: 55°24′N 55°15′E
- Country: Russia
- Region: Bashkortostan
- District: Dyurtyulinsky District
- Time zone: UTC+5:00

Novourtayevo (Russian: Новоуртаево; Bashkir: Яңы Уртай, Yañı Urtay) is a rural locality (a village) in Starobaishevsky Selsoviet, Dyurtyulinsky District, Bashkortostan, Russia. The population was 136 as of 2010. There is 1 street.

== Geography ==
Novourtayevo is located 35 km southeast of Dyurtyuli (the district's administrative centre) by road. Alexandrovka is the nearest rural locality.
