= Andreyevka, Aurgazinsky District, Republic of Bashkortostan =

Andreyevka Андреевка
- Selo
- Location within Bashkortostan Location within Russia
- Coordinates: 54°14′N 55°42′E
- Country: Russia
- Region: Bashkortostan
- District: Aurgazinsky District
- Time zone: UTC+5:00

Andreyevka (Russian: Андре́евка) is a rural locality (a selo) in Tukayevsky Selsoviet, Aurgazinsky District, Bashkortostan, Russia. The population was 235 as of 2010. There are 2 streets.

== Geography ==
Andreyevka is located 36 km northwest of Tolbazy (the district's administrative centre) by road. Makarovo is the nearest rural locality.
