= Andreyevka, Kugarchinsky District, Republic of Bashkortostan =

Andreyevka Андреевка
- Village
- Location within Bashkortostan Location within Russia
- Coordinates: 52°49′N 56°20′E
- Country: Russia
- Region: Bashkortostan
- District: Kugarchinsky District
- Time zone: UTC+5:00

Andreyevka (Russian: Андреевка) is a rural locality (a village) in Zarechensky Selsoviet, Kugarchinsky District, Bashkortostan, Russia. The population was 17 as of 2010. There is 1 street.

== Geography ==
Andreyevka is located 27 km northwest of Mrakovo (the district's administrative centre) by road. Voskresenskoye is the nearest rural locality.
