= Kurmanayevsky District =

Kurmanayevsky District Курманаевский район (Russian)
- District
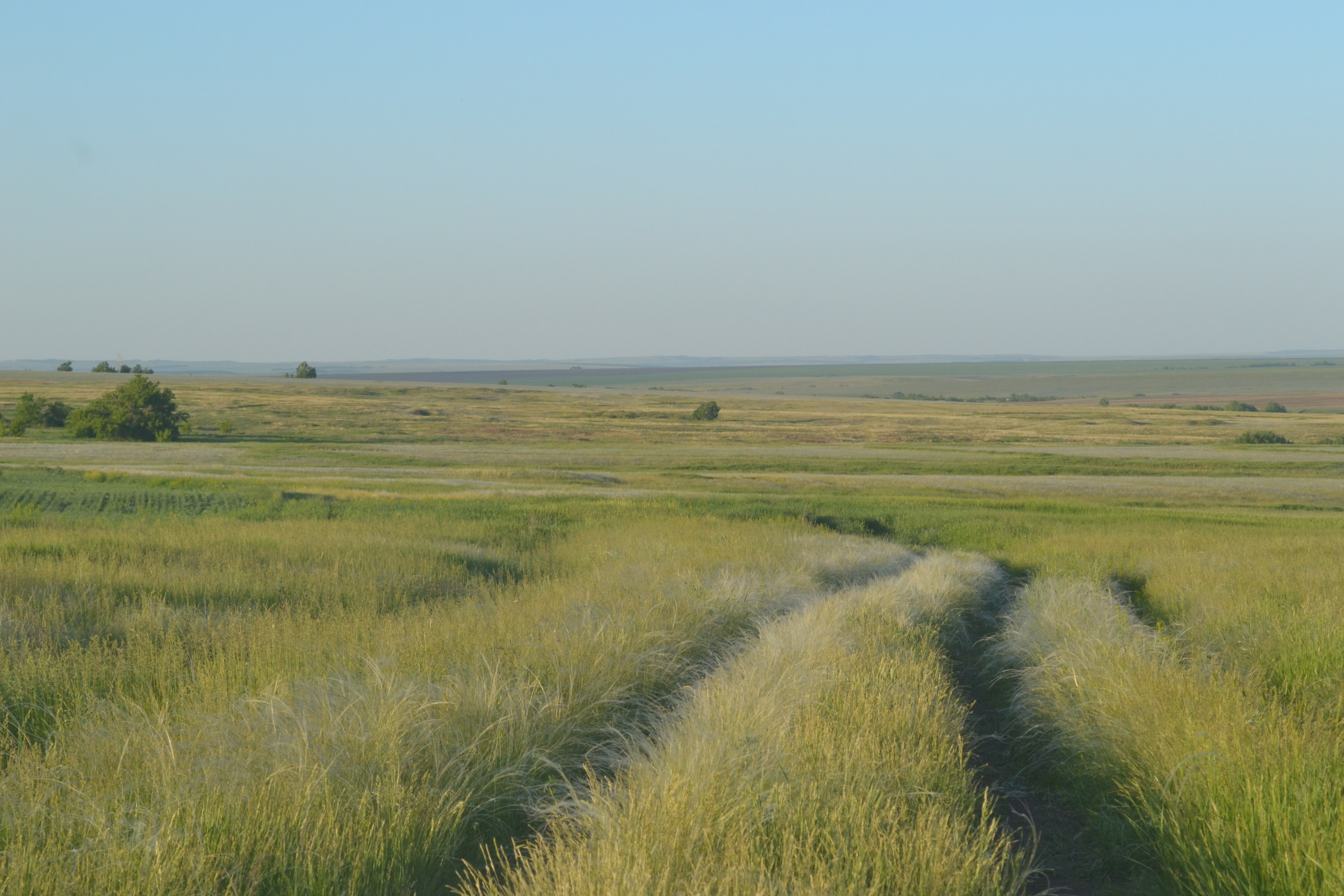
- Steppe landscape in Kurmanayevsky District

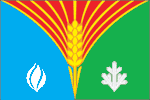
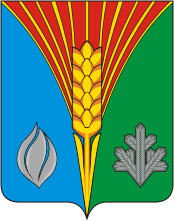
- Flag Coat of arms
- Location of Kurmanayevsky District in Orenburg Oblast
- Coordinates: 52°30′34″N 52°04′15″E
- Country: Russia
- Federal subject: Orenburg Oblast
- Administrative center: Kurmanayevka

Area
  - Total: 2,900 km^{2} (1,100 sq mi)

Population (2010 Census)
  - Total: 17,705
  - Density: 6.1/km^{2} (16/sq mi)
  - Urban: 0%
  - Rural: 100%

Administrative structure
  - Administrative divisions: 17 Selsoviets
  - Inhabited localities: 35 rural localities

Municipal structure
  - Municipally incorporated as: Kurmanayevsky Municipal District
  - Municipal divisions: 0 urban settlements, 15 rural settlements
- Time zone: UTC+5 (MSK+2)
- OKTMO ID: 53625000
- Website: http://kmorb.ru/

Kurmanayevsky District (Russian: Курманаевский райо́н) is an administrative and municipal district (raion), one of the thirty-five in Orenburg Oblast, Russia. It is located in the west of the oblast. The area of the district is 2,900 square kilometers (1,100 sq mi). Its administrative center is the rural locality (a selo) of Kurmanayevka. Population: 17,705 (2010 Census); 21,364 (2002 census); 23,239 (1989 Soviet census). The population of Kurmanayevka accounts for 24.4% of the district's total population.
