= Andreyevka, Republic of Dagestan =

Andreyevka Андреевка
- Selo
- Location within Republic of Dagestan Location within Russia
- Coordinates: 42°10′N 48°12′E
- Country: Russia
- Region: Republic of Dagestan
- District: Derbentsky District
- Time zone: UTC+3:00

Andreyevka (Russian: Андреевка) is a rural locality (a selo) in Pervomaysky Selsoviet, Derbentsky District, Republic of Dagestan, Russia. The population was 326 as of 2010. The village has an Azerbaijani-majority. There are 8 streets.

== Geography ==
Andreyevka is located 20 km northwest of Derbent (the district's administrative centre) by road. Imeni Michurina and Yuny Pakhar are the nearest rural localities.
