= Andreyevka, Ilishevsky District, Republic of Bashkortostan =

Andreyevka Андреевка
- Selo
- Location within Bashkortostan Location within Russia
- Coordinates: 55°41′N 54°23′E
- Country: Russia
- Region: Bashkortostan
- District: Ilishevsky District
- Time zone: UTC+5:00

Andreyevka (Russian: Андреевка) is a rural locality (a selo) and the administrative centre of Andreyevsky Selsoviet, Ilishevsky District, Bashkortostan, Russia. The population was 896 as of 2010. There are 18 streets.

== Geography ==
Andreyevka is located 30 km north of Verkhneyarkeyevo (the district's administrative centre) by road. Anachevo is the nearest rural locality.
