= Andreyevka, Podgorensky District, Voronezh Oblast =

Andreyevka Андреевка
- Selo
- Location within Voronezh Oblast Location within Russia
- Coordinates: 50°30′N 39°47′E
- Country: Russia
- Region: Voronezh Oblast
- District: Podgorensky District
- Time zone: UTC+3:00

Andreyevka (Russian: Андре́евка) is a rural locality (a selo) in Lykovskoye Rural Settlement, Podgorensky District, Voronezh Oblast, Russia. The population was 291 as of 2010. There are 6 streets.

== Geography ==
Andreyevka is located 18 km northeast of Podgorensky (the district's administrative centre) by road. Dolzhik is the nearest rural locality.
