= Andreyevka, Mishkinsky District, Republic of Bashkortostan =

Village in Mishkinsky District, Bashkortostan, Russia

Andreyevka Андреевка
- Village
- Location within Bashkortostan Location within Russia
- Coordinates: 55°34′N 55°38′E
- Country: Russia
- Region: Bashkortostan
- District: Mishkinsky District
- Time zone: UTC+5:00

Andreyevka (Russian: Андреевка) is a rural locality (a village) in Kayrakovsky Selsoviet, Mishkinsky District, Bashkortostan, Russia. The population was 43 as of 2010. There are 2 streets.

== Geography ==
Andreyevka is located 30 km northwest of Mishkino (the district's administrative centre) by road. Kargino is the nearest rural locality.
