= Andreyevka, Arkhangelsky District, Republic of Bashkortostan =

Andreyevka Андреевка
- Village
- Location within Bashkortostan Location within Russia
- Coordinates: 54°17′N 56°34′E
- Country: Russia
- Region: Bashkortostan
- District: Arkhangelsky District
- Time zone: UTC+5:00

Andreyevka (Russian: Андреевка) is a rural locality (a village) in Orlovsky Selsoviet, Arkhangelsky District, Bashkortostan, Russia. The population was 46 as of 2010. There is 1 street.

== Geography ==
Andreyevka is located 21 km southwest of Arkhangelskoye (the district's administrative centre) by road. Abdullino is the nearest rural locality.
