= Andreyevka, Miyakinsky District, Republic of Bashkortostan =

Andreyevka Андреевка
- Village
- Location within Bashkortostan Location within Russia
- Coordinates: 53°41′N 54°45′E
- Country: Russia
- Region: Bashkortostan
- District: Miyakinsky District
- Time zone: UTC+5:00

Andreyevka (Russian: Андреевка) is a rural locality (a village) in Novokarmalinsky Selsoviet, Miyakinsky District, Bashkortostan, Russia. The population was 9 as of 2010. There is 1 street.

== Geography ==
Andreyevka is located 10 km north of Kirgiz-Miyaki (the district's administrative centre) by road. Zirikly is the nearest rural locality.
