= Andreyevka, Shipunovsky District, Altai Krai =

Andreyevka Андреевка
- Settlement
- Location within Altai Krai Location within Russia
- Coordinates: 52°25′N 81°43′E
- Country: Russia
- Region: Altai Krai
- District: Shipunovsky District
- Time zone: UTC+7:00

Andreyevka (Russian: Андреевка) is a rural locality (a settlement) in Zerkalsky Selsoviet, Shipunovsky District, Altai Krai, Russia. The population was 203 as of 2013. There are 4 streets.

== Geography ==
Andreyevka is located 55 km northwest of Shipunovo (the district's administrative centre) by road. Korobeynikovo is the nearest rural locality.
