= Andreyevka, Slavgorod, Altai Krai =

Andreyevka Андреевка
- Selo
- Location within Altai Krai Location within Russia
- Coordinates: 53°06′N 78°46′E
- Country: Russia
- Region: Altai Krai
- District: Slavgorod
- Time zone: UTC+7:00

Andreyevka (Russian: Андреевка) is a rural locality (a selo) in Slavgorod, Altai Krai, Russia. The population was 87 as of 2013. There is 1 street.
