= Novaya Usman =

Rural locality in Voronezh Oblast, Russia

Coordinates: 51°38′42″N 39°24′51″E

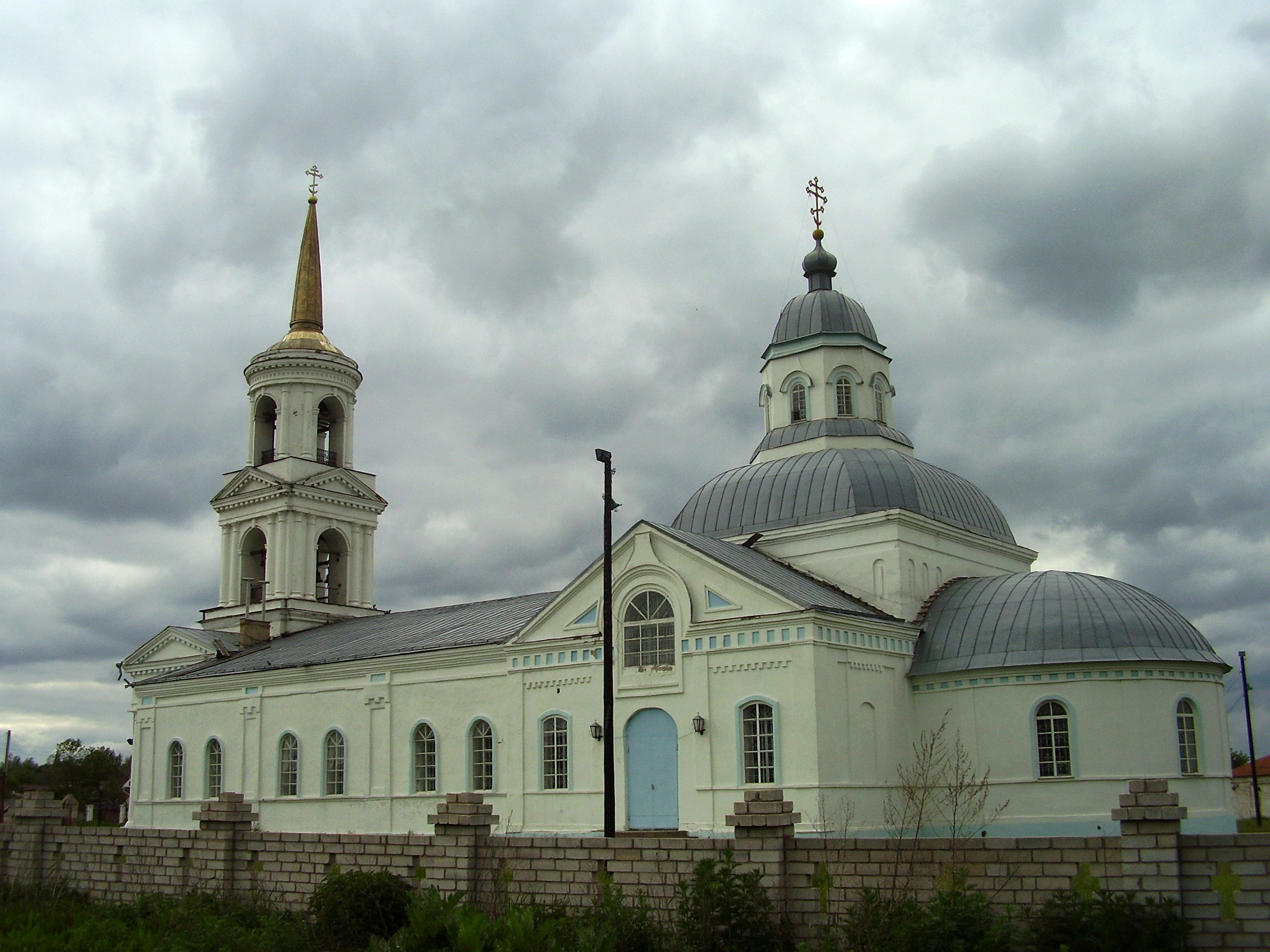
Temple of the Kazan Icon of the Mother of God in Novaya Usman

Novaya Usman (Russian: Новая Усмань) is a rural locality (a selo) and the administrative center of Novousmansky District of Voronezh Oblast, Russia. Population: 36,540 (2021 census); 29,270 (2010 census); 22,476 (2002 census); 18,223 (1989 Soviet census).
