= Novousmansky District =

Novousmansky District Новоусманский район (Russian)
- District
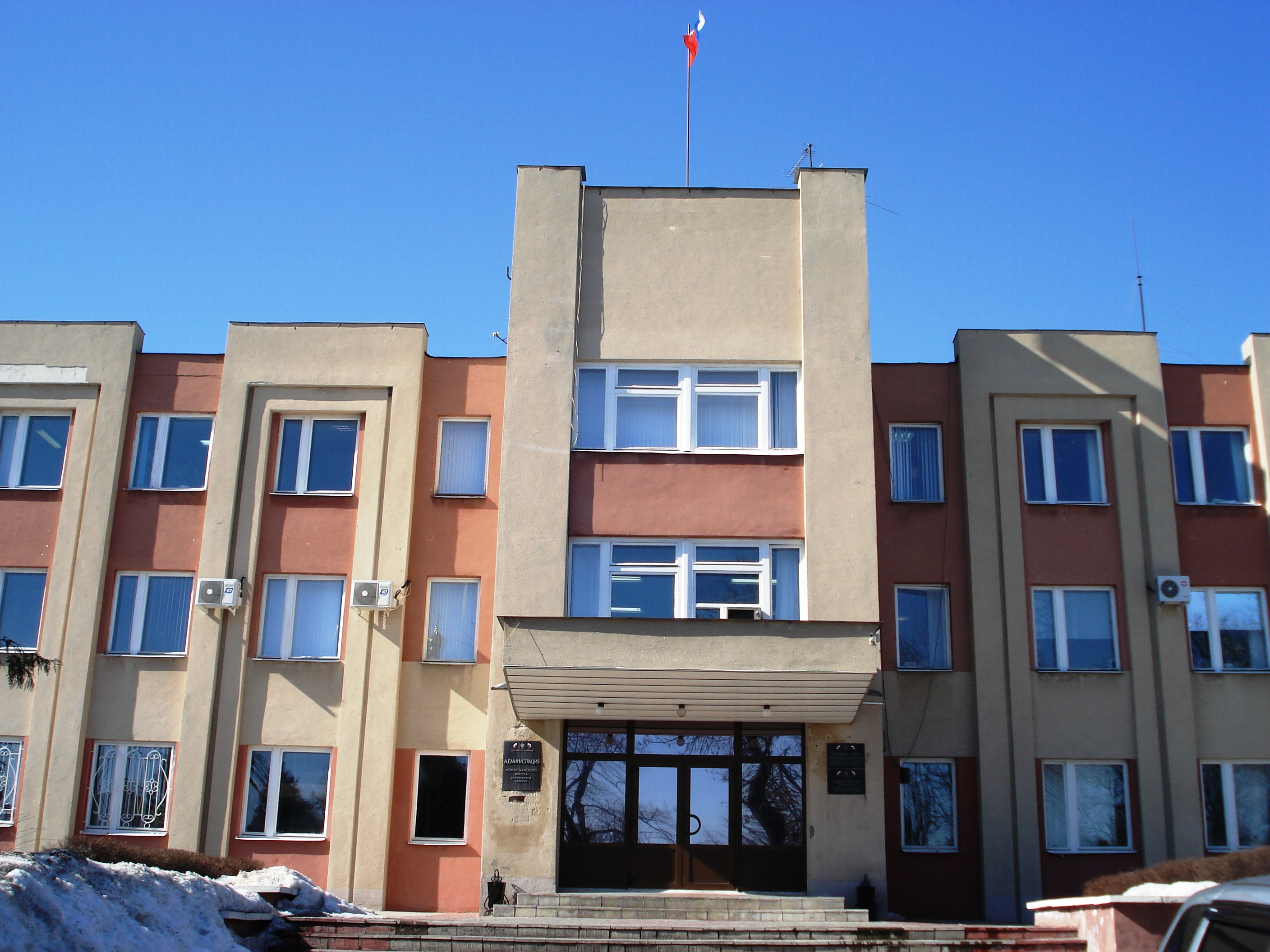
- Novousmansky District Administration building

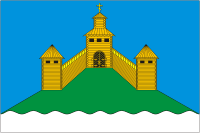
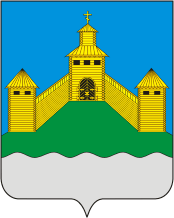
- Flag Coat of arms
- Location of Novousmansky District in Voronezh Oblast
- Coordinates: 51°37′50″N 39°24′10″E
- Country: Russia
- Federal subject: Voronezh Oblast
- Established: 18 September 1929
- Administrative center: Novaya Usman

Area
  - Total: 1,247 km^{2} (481 sq mi)

Population (2010 Census)
  - Total: 73,034
  - Density: 58.57/km^{2} (151.7/sq mi)
  - Urban: 0%
  - Rural: 100%

Administrative structure
  - Administrative divisions: 16 Rural settlements
  - Inhabited localities: 54 rural localities

Municipal structure
  - Municipally incorporated as: Novousmansky Municipal District
  - Municipal divisions: 0 urban settlements, 16 rural settlements
- Time zone: UTC+3 (MSK)
- OKTMO ID: 20625000
- Website: http://nowusman.narod.ru/

Novousmansky District (Russian: Новоу́сманский райо́н) is an administrative and municipal district (raion), one of the thirty-two in Voronezh Oblast, Russia. It is located in the north of the oblast. The area of the district is 1,247 square kilometers (481 sq mi). Its administrative center is the rural locality (a selo) of Novaya Usman. Population: 86,930 (2021 census); 73,034 (2010 census); 64,275 (2002 census); 64,182 (1989 Soviet census). The population of Novaya Usman accounts for 42.0% of the district's total population.
