= Yanaul =

Town in the Republic of Bashkortostan, Russia

Yanaul Янаул
- Town

Other transcription(s)
  - Bashkir: Яңауыл; Yañawıl
- Flag Coat of arms
- Interactive map of Yanaul
- Location of Yanaul Yanaul (Bashkortostan)
- Coordinates: 56°17′N 54°56′E
- Country: Russia
- Federal subject: Bashkortostan
- Known since: first half of the 18th century
- Town status since: 1991
- Elevation: 100 m (330 ft)

Population (2010 Census)
  - Total: 26,924
  - Estimate (2021): 25,908 (−3.8%)

Administrative status
  - Subordinated to: town of republic significance of Yanaul
  - Capital of: Yanaulsky District, town of republic significance of Yanaul

Municipal status
  - Municipal district: Yanaulsky Municipal District
  - Urban settlement: Yanaul Urban Settlement
  - Capital of: Yanaulsky Municipal District, Yanaul Urban Settlement
- Time zone: UTC+5 (MSK+2)
- Postal code: 452800
- OKTMO ID: 80659101001

Yanaul (Russian: Янау́л; Bashkir: Яңауыл, Yañawıl) is a town in the Republic of Bashkortostan, Russia, located on the Yanaulka River, 230 kilometers (140 mi) north of Ufa. Population: 26,924 (2010 census); 27,909 (2002 census); 25,727 (1989 Soviet census).

== History ==
A settlement at the town's current location has existed since the first half of the 18th century. It was granted town status in 1991.

== Administrative and municipal status ==
Within the framework of administrative divisions, Yanaul serves as the administrative center of Yanaulsky District, even though it is not a part of it. As an administrative division, it is incorporated separately as the town of republic significance of Yanaul—an administrative unit with a status equal to that of the districts. As a municipal division, the town of republic significance of Yanaul is incorporated within Yanaulsky Municipal District as Yanaul Urban Settlement.
