= Yanaulsky District =

Yanaulsky District Янаульский район (Russian)
- District

Other transcription(s)
  - Bashkir: Яңауыл районы
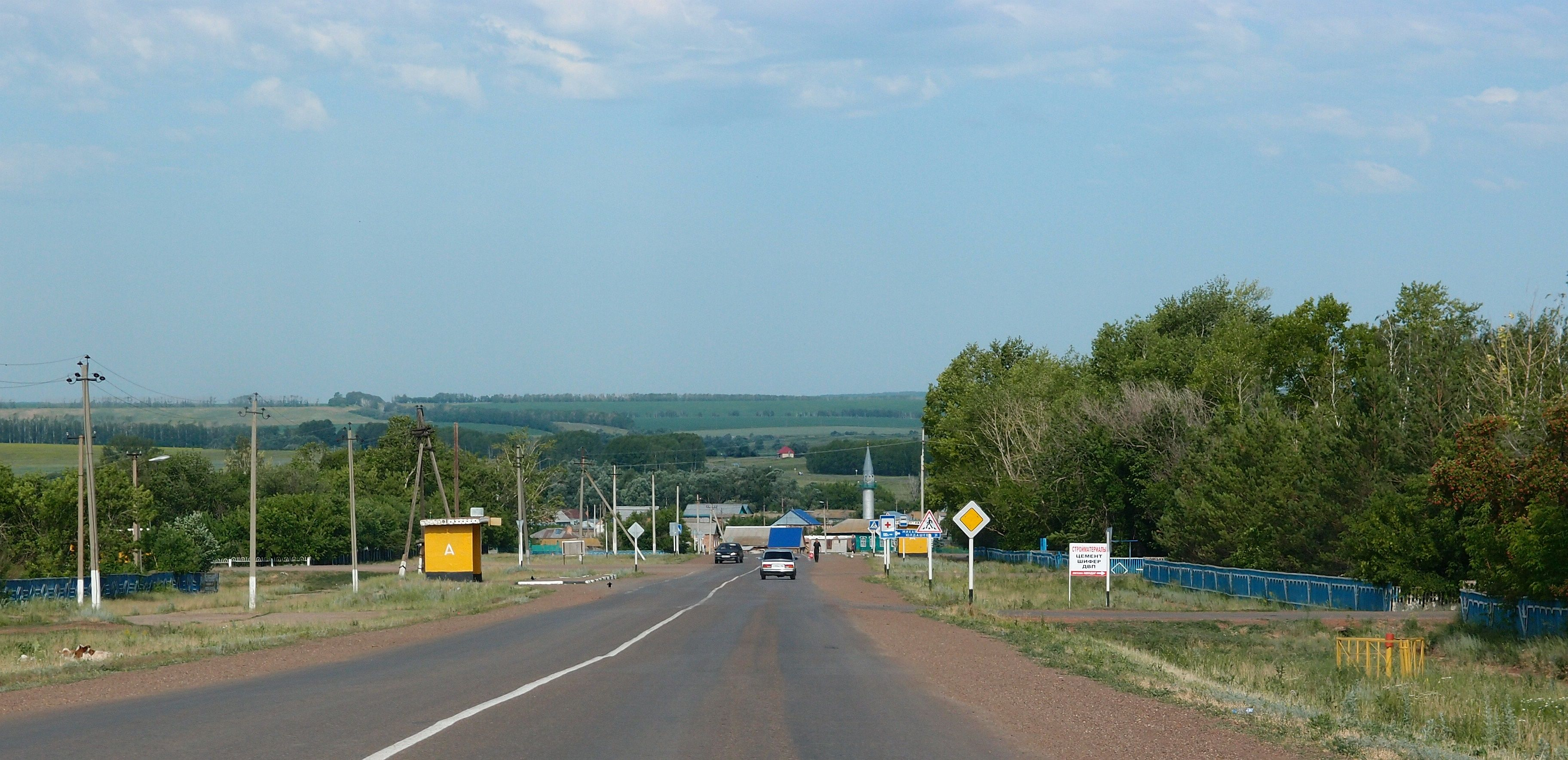
- Bala Chetirman, Yanaulsky District

- Flag Coat of arms
- Location of Yanaulsky District in the Republic of Bashkortostan
- Coordinates: 56°16′N 54°56′E
- Country: Russia
- Federal subject: Republic of Bashkortostan
- Established: August 1930
- Administrative center: Yanaul

Area
  - Total: 2,094 km^{2} (808 sq mi)

Population (2010 Census)
  - Total: 21,210
  - Estimate (2018): 44,360 (+109.1%)
  - Density: 10.13/km^{2} (26.23/sq mi)
  - Urban: 0%
  - Rural: 100%

Administrative structure
  - Administrative divisions: 18 Selsoviets
  - Inhabited localities: 103 rural localities

Municipal structure
  - Municipally incorporated as: Yanaulsky Municipal District
  - Municipal divisions: 1 urban settlements, 18 rural settlements
- Time zone: UTC+5 (MSK+2)
- OKTMO ID: 80659000
- Website: http://www.yanaul.ru

Population of Yanaulsky District
- 2010 Census: 21,210
- 2002 Census: 22,861
- 1989 Census: 49,838
- 1979 Census: 54,204

Yanaulsky District (Russian: Янау́льский райо́н; Bashkir: Яңауыл районы, Yañawıl rayonı) is an administrative and municipal district (raion), one of the fifty-four in the Republic of Bashkortostan, Russia. It is located in the northwest of the republic and borders Perm Krai to the north, Tatyshlinsky District to the east, Burayevsky District to the southeast, Kaltasinsky District to the south, Krasnokamsky District to the southwest and Udmurt Republic to the west. The area of the district is 2,094 square kilometers (808 sq mi). Its administrative center is the town of Yanaul (which is not administratively a part of the district). As of the 2010 Census, the total population of the district was 21,210.

== History ==
The district was established in August 1930.

== Administrative and municipal status ==
Within the framework of administrative divisions, Yanaulsky District is one of the fifty-four in the Republic of Bashkortostan. It is divided into 18 selsoviets, comprising 103 rural localities. The town of Yanaul serves as its administrative center, despite being incorporated separately as a town of republic significance—an administrative unit with the status equal to that of the districts.

As a municipal division, the district is incorporated as Yanaulsky Municipal District, with the town of republic significance of Yanaul being incorporated within it as Yanaul Urban Settlement. Its eighteen selsoviets are incorporated as eighteen rural settlements within the municipal district. The town of Yanaul serves as the administrative center of the municipal district as well.
