= Andreyevsky (rural locality) =

Andreyevsky (Russian: Андреевский; masculine), Andreyevskaya (Андреевская; feminine), or Andreyevskoye (Андреевское; neuter) is the name of several rural localities in Russia.

== Modern localities ==
=== Altai Krai ===
As of 2014, one rural locality in Altai Krai bears this name:

Altai Krai location map
Location of Andreyevsky in Altai Krai
- Andreyevsky, Altai Krai (or Andreyevskoye), a settlement in Oktyabrsky Selsoviet of Zmeinogorsky District; 51°06′N 82°50′E

=== Arkhangelsk Oblast ===
As of 2014, nine rural localities in Arkhangelsk Oblast bear this name:

Arkhangelsk Oblast distribution map
Distribution of the inhabited localities called Andreyevskaya in Arkhangelsk Oblast.
- Andreyevskaya, Kargopolsky District, Arkhangelsk Oblast, a village in Priozerny Selsoviet of Kargopolsky District; 62°01′N 38°59′E
- Andreyevskaya, Kotlassky District, Arkhangelsk Oblast, a village in Pacheozersky Selsoviet of Kotlassky District; 61°21′N 46°42′E
- Andreyevskaya, Krasnoborsky District, Arkhangelsk Oblast, a village in Cherevkovsky Selsoviet of Krasnoborsky District; 61°42′N 45°24′E
- Andreyevskaya, Andreyevsky Selsoviet, Nyandomsky District, Arkhangelsk Oblast, a village in Andreyevsky Selsoviet of Nyandomsky District; 61°37′N 40°04′E
- Andreyevskaya, Shalakushsky Selsoviet, Nyandomsky District, Arkhangelsk Oblast, a village in Shalakushsky Selsoviet of Nyandomsky District; 62°07′N 40°41′E
- Andreyevskaya, Shenkursky District, Arkhangelsk Oblast, a village in Rovdinsky Selsoviet of Shenkursky District; 61°41′N 42°23′E
- Andreyevskaya, Seftrensky Selsoviet, Verkhnetoyemsky District, Arkhangelsk Oblast, a village in Seftrensky Selsoviet of Verkhnetoyemsky District; 62°21′N 44°44′E
- Andreyevskaya, Timoshinsky Selsoviet, Verkhnetoyemsky District, Arkhangelsk Oblast, a village in Timoshinsky Selsoviet of Verkhnetoyemsky District; 61°59′N 45°35′E
- Andreyevskaya, Vilegodsky District, Arkhangelsk Oblast, a village in Nikolsky Selsoviet of Vilegodsky District; 61°15′N 47°37′E

=== Republic of Bashkortostan ===
As of 2014, one rural locality in the Republic of Bashkortostan bears this name:

Republic of Bashkortostan location map
Location of Andreyevsky in the Republic of Bashkortostan
- Andreyevsky, Republic of Bashkortostan, a khutor in Alexandrovsky Selsoviet of Meleuzovsky District; 53°03′N 56°23′E

=== Chelyabinsk Oblast ===
As of 2014, two rural localities in Chelyabinsk Oblast bear this name:

Chelyabinsk Oblast distribution map
Distribution of the inhabited localities called Andreyevsky in Chelyabinsk Oblast.
- Andreyevsky, Bredinsky District, Chelyabinsk Oblast (or Andreyevskoye), a settlement in Andreyevsky Selsoviet of Bredinsky District; 52°23′N 60°48′E
- Andreyevsky, Plastovsky District, Chelyabinsk Oblast, a settlement in Borisovsky Selsoviet of Plastovsky District; 54°14′N 60°44′E

=== Ivanovo Oblast ===
As of 2014, three rural localities in Ivanovo Oblast bear this name:

Ivanovo Oblast distribution map
Distribution in Ivanovo Oblast.
- Andreyevskoye, Privolzhsky District, Ivanovo Oblast, a village in Privolzhsky District; 57°21′N 41°22′E
- Andreyevskoye, Rodnikovsky District, Ivanovo Oblast, a village in Rodnikovsky District; 57°06′N 41°56′E
- Andreyevskaya, Ivanovo Oblast, a village in Lukhsky District; 57°02′N 42°24′E

=== Kaluga Oblast ===
As of 2014, four rural localities in Kaluga Oblast bear this name:

- Andreyevskoye, Kaluga, Kaluga Oblast, a village under the administrative jurisdiction of the City of Kaluga
- Andreyevskoye, Dzerzhinsky District, Kaluga Oblast, a village in Dzerzhinsky District
- Andreyevskoye, Ferzikovsky District, Kaluga Oblast, a village in Ferzikovsky District
- Andreyevskoye, Tarussky District, Kaluga Oblast, a village in Tarussky District

=== Kirov Oblast ===
As of 2014, one rural locality in Kirov Oblast bears this name:

Kirov Oblast location map
Location of Andreyevsky in Kirov Oblast
- Andreyevsky, Kirov Oblast, a settlement in Bogdanovsky Rural Okrug of Urzhumsky District; 57°10′N 49°52′E

=== Kostroma Oblast ===
As of 2014, four rural localities in Kostroma Oblast bear this name:

Kostroma Oblast distribution map
Distribution of the inhabited localities called Andreyevskoye in Kostroma Oblast.
- Andreyevskoye, Buysky District, Kostroma Oblast, a village in Tsentralnoye Settlement of Buysky District; 58°10′N 41°18′E
- Andreyevskoye, Chukhlomsky District, Kostroma Oblast, a village in Nozhkinskoye Settlement of Chukhlomsky District; 58°50′N 42°33′E
- Andreyevskoye, Makaryevsky District, Kostroma Oblast, a village in Ust-Neyskoye Settlement of Makaryevsky District; 57°49′N 43°38′E
- Andreyevskoye, Susaninsky District, Kostroma Oblast, a selo in Andreyevskoye Settlement of Susaninsky District; 58°10′N 41°18′E

=== Krasnodar Krai ===
As of 2014, one rural locality in Krasnodar Krai bears this name:

Krasnodar Krai location map
Location of Andreyevskaya in Krasnodar Krai
- Andreyevskaya, Krasnodar Krai, a stanitsa in Boykoponursky Rural Okrug of Kalininsky District; 45°19′N 38°40′E

=== Kursk Oblast ===
As of 2014, one rural locality in Kursk Oblast bears this name:

- Andreyevsky, Kursk Oblast, a settlement in Skorodnyansky Selsoviet of Bolshesoldatsky District

=== Mari El Republic ===
As of 2014, one rural locality in the Mari El Republic bears this name:

Mari El Republic location map
Location of Andreyevsky in the Mari El Republic
- Andreyevsky, Mari El Republic, a pochinok under the administrative jurisdiction of Mari-Turek Urban-Type Settlement in Mari-Tureksky District; 56°46′N 49°35′E

=== Federal city of Moscow ===
As of 2014, one rural locality in the federal city of Moscow bears this name:

- Andreyevskoye, Moscow, a village in Ryazanovskoye Settlement of Novomoskovsky Administrative Okrug

=== Moscow Oblast ===
As of 2014, seven rural localities in Moscow Oblast bear this name:

Moscow Oblast distribution map
Distribution of the inhabited localities called Andreyevskoye in Moscow Oblast.
- Andreyevskoye, Istrinsky District, Moscow Oblast, a village in Yermolinskoye Rural Settlement of Istrinsky District; 55°57′N 36°52′E
- Andreyevskoye, Kashirsky District, Moscow Oblast (or Andreyevskaya), a village in Znamenskoye Rural Settlement of Kashirsky District; 54°49′N 38°19′E
- Andreyevskoye, Kolomensky District, Moscow Oblast, a selo in Provodnikovskoye Rural Settlement of Kolomensky District; 55°07′N 38°37′E
- Andreyevskoye, Leninsky District, Moscow Oblast (or Andreyevskaya), a village in Molokovskoye Rural Settlement of Leninsky District; 55°33′N 37°55′E
- Andreyevskoye, Mozhaysky District, Moscow Oblast, a village in Borisovskoye Rural Settlement of Mozhaysky District; 55°23′N 36°00′E
- Andreyevskoye, Odintsovsky District, Moscow Oblast, a selo in Yershovskoye Rural Settlement of Odintsovsky District; 55°46′N 36°35′E
- Andreyevskoye, Shakhovskoy District, Moscow Oblast (or Andreyevskaya), a village in Stepankovskoye Rural Settlement of Shakhovskoy District; 55°58′N 35°36′E

=== Omsk Oblast ===
As of 2014, one rural locality in Omsk Oblast bears this name:

Omsk Oblast location map
Location of Andreyevsky in Omsk Oblast
- Andreyevsky, Omsk Oblast, a settlement in Andreyevsky Rural Okrug of Omsky District; 55°06′N 73°43′E

=== Orenburg Oblast ===
As of 2014, one rural locality in Orenburg Oblast bears this name:

- Andreyevsky, Orenburg Oblast, a khutor in Troitsky Selsoviet of Tyulgansky District

=== Rostov Oblast ===
As of 2014, one rural locality in Rostov Oblast bears this name:

Rostov Oblast location map
Location of Andreyevskaya in Rostov Oblast
- Andreyevskaya, Rostov Oblast, a stanitsa in Andreyevskoye Rural Settlement of Dubovsky District; 47°22′N 43°02′E

=== Sakha Republic ===
As of 2014, one rural locality in the Sakha Republic bears this name:

- Andreyevsky, Sakha Republic, a selo in Yedyugeysky Rural Okrug of Verkhnevilyuysky District

=== Smolensk Oblast ===
As of 2014, one rural locality in Smolensk Oblast bears this name:

- Andreyevskoye, Smolensk Oblast, a village in Leonidovskoye Rural Settlement of Yelninsky District

=== Stavropol Krai ===
As of 2014, two rural localities in Stavropol Krai bear this name:

- Andreyevsky, Kochubeyevsky District, Stavropol Krai, a khutor in Vasilyevsky Selsoviet of Kochubeyevsky District
- Andreyevsky, Sovetsky District, Stavropol Krai, a khutor in Soldato-Alexsandrovsky Selsoviet of Sovetsky District

=== Tver Oblast ===
As of 2014, seven rural localities in Tver Oblast bear this name:

- Andreyevskoye, Bezhetsky District, Tver Oblast, a village in Filippkovskoye Rural Settlement of Bezhetsky District
- Andreyevskoye, Kalininsky District, Tver Oblast, a village in Zavolzhskoye Rural Settlement of Kalininsky District
- Andreyevskoye, Kalyazinsky District, Tver Oblast, a village in Nerlskoye Rural Settlement of Kalyazinsky District
- Andreyevskoye, Konakovsky District, Tver Oblast, a village in Gorodenskoye Rural Settlement of Konakovsky District
- Andreyevskoye, Rameshkovsky District, Tver Oblast, a selo in Kiverichi Rural Settlement of Rameshkovsky District
- Andreyevskoye, Rzhevsky District, Tver Oblast, a village in Itomlya Rural Settlement of Rzhevsky District
- Andreyevskoye, Zapadnodvinsky District, Tver Oblast, a village in Sharapovskoye Rural Settlement of Zapadnodvinsky District

=== Tyumen Oblast ===
As of 2014, one rural locality in Tyumen Oblast bears this name:

- Andreyevsky, Tyumen Oblast, a settlement in Andreyevsky Rural Okrug of Tyumensky District

=== Udmurt Republic ===
As of 2014, one rural locality in the Udmurt Republic bears this name:

- Andreyevsky, Udmurt Republic, a pochinok in Mysovsky Selsoviet of Kezsky District

=== Vladimir Oblast ===
As of 2014, five rural localities in Vladimir Oblast bear this name:

- Andreyevskoye, Alexandrovsky District, Vladimir Oblast, a selo in Alexandrovsky District
- Andreyevskoye (Krasnoselskoye Rural Settlement), Yuryev-Polsky District, Vladimir Oblast, a selo in Yuryev-Polsky District; municipally, a part of Krasnoselskoye Rural Settlement of that district
- Andreyevskoye (Nebylovskoye Rural Settlement), Yuryev-Polsky District, Vladimir Oblast, a selo in Yuryev-Polsky District; municipally, a part of Nebylovskoye Rural Settlement of that district
- Andreyevskaya, Gus-Khrustalny District, Vladimir Oblast, a village in Gus-Khrustalny District
- Andreyevskaya, Petushinsky District, Vladimir Oblast, a selo in Petushinsky District

=== Volgograd Oblast ===
As of 2014, one rural locality in Volgograd Oblast bears this name:

- Andreyevsky, Volgograd Oblast, a khutor in Khopersky Selsoviet of Novonikolayevsky District

=== Vologda Oblast ===
As of 2014, fifteen rural localities in Vologda Oblast bear this name:

- Andreyevskoye, Babushkinsky District, Vologda Oblast, a selo in Roslyatinsky Selsoviet of Babushkinsky District
- Andreyevskoye, Sokolsky District, Vologda Oblast, a village in Chuchkovsky Selsoviet of Sokolsky District
- Andreyevskoye, Ust-Kubinsky District, Vologda Oblast, a village in Ustyansky Selsoviet of Ust-Kubinsky District
- Andreyevskoye, Vologodsky District, Vologda Oblast, a village in Podlesny Selsoviet of Vologodsky District
- Andreyevskaya, Kharovsky District, Vologda Oblast, a village in Kumzersky Selsoviet of Kharovsky District
- Andreyevskaya, Korotetsky Selsoviet, Kirillovsky District, Vologda Oblast, a village in Korotetsky Selsoviet of Kirillovsky District
- Andreyevskaya, Kovarzinsky Selsoviet, Kirillovsky District, Vologda Oblast, a village in Kovarzinsky Selsoviet of Kirillovsky District
- Andreyevskaya, Syamzhensky District, Vologda Oblast, a village in Zhityevsky Selsoviet of Syamzhensky District
- Andreyevskaya, Markushevsky Selsoviet, Tarnogsky District, Vologda Oblast, a village in Markushevsky Selsoviet of Tarnogsky District
- Andreyevskaya, Ozeretsky Selsoviet, Tarnogsky District, Vologda Oblast, a village in Ozeretsky Selsoviet of Tarnogsky District
- Andreyevskaya, Ust-Kubinsky District, Vologda Oblast, a village in Avksentyevsky Selsoviet of Ust-Kubinsky District
- Andreyevskaya, Vashkinsky District, Vologda Oblast, a village in Andreyevsky Selsoviet of Vashkinsky District
- Andreyevskaya, Verkhovazhsky District, Vologda Oblast, a village in Naumovsky Selsoviet of Verkhovazhsky District
- Andreyevskaya, Vozhegodsky District, Vologda Oblast, a village in Punemsky Selsoviet of Vozhegodsky District
- Andreyevskaya, Vytegorsky District, Vologda Oblast, a village in Devyatinsky Selsoviet of Vytegorsky District

=== Yaroslavl Oblast ===
As of 2014, thirteen rural localities in Yaroslavl Oblast bear this name:

- Andreyevskoye, Blagoveshchensky Rural Okrug, Bolsheselsky District, Yaroslavl Oblast, a selo in Blagoveshchensky Rural Okrug of Bolsheselsky District
- Andreyevskoye, Chudinovsky Rural Okrug, Bolsheselsky District, Yaroslavl Oblast, a village in Chudinovsky Rural Okrug of Bolsheselsky District
- Andreyevskoye, Andreyevsky Rural Okrug, Borisoglebsky District, Yaroslavl Oblast, a selo in Andreyevsky Rural Okrug of Borisoglebsky District
- Andreyevskoye, Demyanovsky Rural Okrug, Borisoglebsky District, Yaroslavl Oblast, a village in Demyanovsky Rural Okrug of Borisoglebsky District
- Andreyevskoye, Nekouzsky District, Yaroslavl Oblast, a mestechko in Shestikhinsky Rural Okrug of Nekouzsky District
- Andreyevskoye, Nekrasovsky District, Yaroslavl Oblast, a village in Nikolsky Rural Okrug of Nekrasovsky District
- Andreyevskoye, Pereslavsky District, Yaroslavl Oblast, a village in Lychensky Rural Okrug of Pereslavsky District
- Andreyevskoye, Poshekhonsky District, Yaroslavl Oblast, a village in Yermakovsky Rural Okrug of Poshekhonsky District
- Andreyevskoye, Rostovsky District, Yaroslavl Oblast, a village in Lyubilkovsky Rural Okrug of Rostovsky District
- Andreyevskoye, Rybinsky District, Yaroslavl Oblast, a village in Oktyabrsky Rural Okrug of Rybinsky District
- Andreyevskoye, Gavrilovsky Rural Okrug, Yaroslavsky District, Yaroslavl Oblast, a village in Gavrilovsky Rural Okrug of Yaroslavsky District
- Andreyevskoye, Tochishchensky Rural Okrug, Yaroslavsky District, Yaroslavl Oblast, a village in Tochishchensky Rural Okrug of Yaroslavsky District
- Andreyevskaya, Yaroslavl Oblast, a village in Florovsky Rural Okrug of Myshkinsky District

== Alternative names ==
- Andreyevsky, alternative name of Andreyevka, a settlement in Zerkalsky Selsoviet of Shipunovsky District in Altai Krai; 52°26′N 81°44′E
- Andreyevsky, alternative name of Andreyevka, a selo in Prokhorovsky District of Belgorod Oblast; municipally, a part of Kholodnyanskoye Rural Settlement of that district; 51°02′N 37°09′E
- Andreyevsky, alternative name of Andreyevka, a village in Klyukovensky Rural Administrative Okrug of Navlinsky District in Bryansk Oblast; 52°55′N 34°23′E
- Andreyevsky, alternative name of Andreyevka, a village in Kuybyshevsky District of Novosibirsk Oblast; 55°42′N 79°09′E
- Andreyevsky, alternative name of Andreyevka, a village in Bogolyubovsky Rural Okrug of Lyubinsky District in Omsk Oblast; 55°19′N 72°35′E
- Andreyevskaya, alternative name of Novoandreyevka, a selo under the administrative jurisdiction of the City of Miass in Chelyabinsk Oblast; 55°20′N 60°14′E
- Andreyevskaya, alternative name of Andreyevka, a village in Petrovsky Selsoviet of Uvelsky District in Chelyabinsk Oblast; 54°29′N 61°52′E
- Andreyevskaya, alternative name of Andreyevskiye Vyselki, a village under the administrative jurisdiction of the Town of Shatura in Shatursky District of Moscow Oblast; 55°38′N 39°31′E
- Andreyevskaya, alternative name of Andreyevka, a village in Andreyevsky Rural Okrug of Okoneshnikovsky District in Omsk Oblast; 54°32′N 75°04′E
- Andreyevskoye, alternative name of Andreyevka, a selo in Andreyevsky Selsoviet of Ilishevsky District in the Republic of Bashkortostan; 55°41′N 54°24′E
- Andreyevskoye, alternative name of Andreyevka, a village in Nepetsinskoye Rural Settlement of Kolomensky District in Moscow Oblast; 55°13′N 38°34′E
- Andreyevskoye, alternative name of Andreyevka, a work settlement under the administrative jurisdiction of Andreyevka Work Settlement in Solnechnogorsky District of Moscow Oblast; 55°59′N 37°08′E
- Andreyevskoye, alternative name of Andreyevka, a selo in Bagansky District of Novosibirsk Oblast; 53°50′N 77°26′E

== See also ==
- Andreyevka (disambiguation)
