= Bagadya =

Bagadya (Russian: Багадя) is the name of several rural localities in the Sakha Republic, Russia:

- Bagadya, Kobyaysky District, Sakha Republic, a selo in Lyuchcheginsky 1-y Rural Okrug of Kobyaysky District
- Bagadya, Verkhnevilyuysky District, Sakha Republic, a selo in Surguluksky Rural Okrug of Verkhnevilyuysky District
