= Balagannakh =

Balagannakh (Russian: Балаганнах) is the name of several rural localities in the Sakha Republic, Russia:

- Balagannakh, Olyokminsky District, Sakha Republic, a selo in Khorinsky Rural Okrug of Olyokminsky District
- Balagannakh, Ust-Aldansky District, Sakha Republic, a selo in Kurbusakhsky Rural Okrug of Ust-Aldansky District
- Balagannakh, Verkhnevilyuysky District, Sakha Republic, a selo in Balagannakhsky Rural Okrug of Verkhnevilyuysky District
