= Byuteydyakh =

Byuteydyakh (Russian: Бютейдях) is the name of several rural localities in the Sakha Republic, Russia:

- Byuteydyakh, Megino-Kangalassky District, Sakha Republic, a selo in Byuteydyakhsky Rural Okrug of Megino-Kangalassky District
- Byuteydyakh, Verkhnevilyuysky District, Sakha Republic, a selo in Dyullyukinsky Rural Okrug of Verkhnevilyuysky District
