= Orosu =

Orosu Оросу
- Selo

Other transcription(s)
  - Yakut: Ороһу
- Interactive map of Orosu
- Location of Orosu Orosu (Sakha Republic)
- Coordinates: 63°30′00″N 120°44′48″E
- Country: Russia
- Federal subject: Sakha Republic
- Administrative district: Verkhnevilyuysky District
- Rural okrugSelsoviet: Orosunsky Rural Okrug

Population (2010 Census)
  - Total: 730
  - Estimate (2021): 695 (−4.8%)

Administrative status
  - Capital of: Orosunsky Rural Okrug

Municipal status
  - Municipal district: Verkhnevilyuysky Municipal District
  - Rural settlement: Orosunsky Rural Settlement
  - Capital of: Orosunsky Rural Settlement
- Time zone: UTC+
- OKTMO ID: 98614460101

Orosu (Russian: Оросу; Yakut: Ороһу, romanized: Orohu) is a rural locality (a selo), the only inhabited locality, and the administrative center of Orosunsky Rural Okrug of Verkhnevilyuysky District in the Sakha Republic, Russia, located 25 kilometers (16 mi) from Verkhnevilyuysk, the administrative center of the district. Across the river to the east is Tamalakan. Its population as of the 2010 Census was 730, of whom 344 were male and 386 female, up from 719 as recorded during the 2002 Census.
