= Andrijauskas =

- Lithuanian surname
- m.: Andrijauskas
- f.: (unmarried): Andrijauskaitė
- f.: (married): Andrijauskienė
- Origin: East Slavic
- Related names: Andrejauskas Andreevsky/Andreevski

Andrijauskas is a Lithuanian language family name derived from Andrijus (Ukrainian: Андрі́й, romanized: Andrij). It may refer to:

- Antanas Andrijauskas, Lithuanian culturologist
- Lina Andrijauskaitė, Lithuanian athlete
- Paulius Andrijauskas, Lithuanian swimmer
