= Andreyevsky =

Andreyevsky (masculine), Andreyevskaya (feminine), or Andreyevskoye (neuter) may refer to:

- Andreyevsky (surname), Slavic last name
- Andreyevsky (rural locality) (Andreyevskaya, Andreyevskoye), several rural localities in Russia
- Andreyevsky Bridge, a historical bridge in Moscow, Russia demolished in 1998
