= May, Verkhnevilyuysky District, Sakha Republic =

May Май
- Selo
- Interactive map of May
- Location of May May (Sakha Republic)
- Coordinates: 63°48′47″N 120°09′11″E
- Country: Russia
- Federal subject: Sakha Republic
- Administrative district: Verkhnevilyuysky District
- Rural okrugSelsoviet: Meyiksky Rural Okrug

Population (2010 Census)
  - Total: 64
  - Estimate (2021): 52 (−18.8%)

Municipal status
  - Municipal district: Verkhnevilyuysky Municipal District
  - Rural settlement: Meyiksky Rural Settlement
- Time zone: UTC+
- Postal code: 678241
- OKTMO ID: 98614440106

May (Russian: Май; Yakut: Маай, Maay) is a rural locality (a selo), one of two settlements, in addition to Sayylyk, in Meyiksky Rural Okrug of Verkhnevilyuysky District in the Sakha Republic, Russia. It is located 56 kilometers (35 mi) from Verkhnevilyuysk, the administrative center of the district and 14 kilometers (8.7 mi) from Botulu. Its population as of the 2010 Census was 64, of whom were 43 male and 21 female, up from 59 as recorded during the 2002 Census.
