= Kudu, Russia =

Kudu Куду Куду (Sakha)
- Selo
- Interactive map of Kudu
- Location of Kudu Kudu (Sakha Republic)
- Coordinates: 63°16′14″N 120°30′00″E
- Country: Russia
- Federal subject: Sakha Republic
- Administrative district: Verkhnevilyuysky District
- Rural okrugSelsoviet: Edyugeysky Rural Okrug

Population
  - Estimate (2021): 73 )

Municipal status
  - Municipal district: Verkhnevilyuysky Municipal District
  - Rural settlement: Edyugeysky Rural Settlement
- Time zone: UTC+
- Postal code: 678230
- OKTMO ID: 98614423106

Kudu (Russian: Куду; Yakut: Куду) is a rural locality (a selo), one of two settlements, in addition to Andreyevsky, in Edyugeysky Rural Okrug of Verkhnevilyuysky District in the Sakha Republic, Russia. It is located 30 kilometers (19 mi) from Verkhnevilyuysk, the administrative center of the district and 25 kilometers (16 mi) from Botulu. Its population as of the 2010 Census was 80, of whom were 45 male and 35 female, up from 66 as recorded during the 2002 Census.
