= Orgyot =

Orgyot Оргёт
- Selo
- Interactive map of Orgyot
- Location of Orgyot Orgyot (Sakha Republic)
- Coordinates: 63°09′N 120°55′E
- Country: Russia
- Federal subject: Sakha Republic
- Administrative district: Verkhnevilyuysky District
- Rural okrugSelsoviet: Orgyotsky Rural Okrug

Population (2010 Census)
  - Total: 579
  - Estimate (2021): 517 (−10.7%)

Administrative status
  - Capital of: Orgyotsky Rural Okrug

Municipal status
  - Municipal district: Verkhnevilyuysky Municipal District
  - Rural settlement: Orgyotsky Rural Settlement
  - Capital of: Orgyotsky Rural Settlement
- Time zone: UTC+
- Postal code: 678248
- OKTMO ID: 98614455101

Orgyot (Russian: Оргёт; Yakut: Өргүөт, Örgüöt) is a rural locality (a selo), the only inhabited locality, and the administrative center of Orgyotsky Rural Okrug of Verkhnevilyuysky District in the Sakha Republic, Russia, located 60 kilometers (37 mi) from Verkhnevilyuysk, the administrative center of the district. down from 613 recorded during the 2002 Census.
