= Kharbalakhsky Rural Okrug =

Human settlement in Verkhnevilyuysky district, Russia

Kharbalakhsky Nasleg Харбалахский наслег
- Rural settlement
- Location within Sakha Republic Location within Russia
- Coordinates: 63.5439256°N 121.0052204°E
- Country: Russia
- Federal subject: Sakha Republic (Yakutia)
- District: Verkhnevilyuysky District
- Administrative center: Kyul (selo)

Area
  - Total: 676.89 km^{2} (261.35 sq mi)

Population (2021)
  - Total: 588
  - Density: 0.869/km^{2} (2.25/sq mi)

Kharbalakhsky Nasleg is a rural okrug in the Verkhnevilyuysky District of Yakutia, Russia.

The administrative center and only inhabited locality in Kharbalakhsky is the village of Kyul.

== Population ==
The population of Kharbalahsky as of 2021 was 588. The entire population is in Kyul, the only inhabited locality in Kharbalahsky.
