= Lippe-Atakh =

Lippe-Atakh Липпе-Атах
- Selo
- Interactive map of Lippe-Atakh
- Location of Lippe-Atakh Lippe-Atakh (Sakha Republic)
- Coordinates: 63°43′N 119°52′E
- Country: Russia
- Federal subject: Sakha Republic
- Administrative district: Verkhnevilyuysky District
- Rural okrugSelsoviet: Onkhoysky Rural Okrug

Population (2010 Census)
  - Total: 620
  - Estimate (2021): 637 (+2.7%)

Administrative status
  - Capital of: Onkhoysky Rural Okrug

Municipal status
  - Municipal district: Verkhnevilyuysky Municipal District
  - Rural settlement: Onkhoysky Rural Settlement
  - Capital of: Onkhoysky Rural Settlement
- Time zone: UTC+
- Postal code: 678238
- OKTMO ID: 98614450101

Lippe-Atakh (Russian: Липпе-Атах; Yakut: Оҥхой, Oŋxoy) is a rural locality (a selo), the only inhabited locality, and the administrative center of Onkhoysky Rural Okrug of Verkhnevilyuysky District in the Sakha Republic, Russia, located 50 kilometers (31 mi) from Verkhnevilyuysk, the administrative center of the district. Its population as of the 2010 Census was 620, up from 558 recorded during the 2002 Census.
