= Byrakan =

Byrakan Быракан Быракаан (Sakha)
- Selo
- Interactive map of Byrakan
- Location of Byrakan Byrakan (Sakha Republic)
- Coordinates: 63°00′58″N 121°14′00″E
- Country: Russia
- Federal subject: Sakha Republic
- Administrative district: Verkhnevilyuysky District
- Rural okrugSelsoviet: Byrakansky Rural Okrug

Population (2010 Census)
  - Total: 254
  - Estimate (2021): 239 (−5.9%)

Administrative status
  - Capital of: Byrakansky Rural Okrug

Municipal status
  - Municipal district: Verkhnevilyuysky Municipal District
  - Rural settlement: Byrakansky Rural Settlement
  - Capital of: Byrakansky Rural Settlement
- Time zone: UTC+
- Postal code: 678248
- OKTMO ID: 98614407101

Byrakan (Russian: Быракан; Yakut: Быракаан, Bırakaan) is a rural locality (a selo), the only inhabited locality, and the administrative center of Byrakansky Rural Okrug of Verkhnevilyuysky District in the Sakha Republic, Russia, located 90 kilometers (56 mi) from Verkhnevilyuysk, the administrative center of the district. Its population as of the 2010 Census was 254, of whom 128 were male and 126 female, down from 265 as recorded during the 2002 Census.
