= Keng-Kyuyol, Verkhnevilyuysky District, Sakha Republic =

Keng-Kyuyol Кенг-Кюёль
- Selo
- Interactive map of Keng-Kyuyol
- Location of Keng-Kyuyol Keng-Kyuyol (Sakha Republic)
- Coordinates: 64°25′28″N 119°45′14″E
- Country: Russia
- Federal subject: Sakha Republic
- Administrative district: Verkhnevilyuysky District
- Rural okrugSelsoviet: Surguluksky Rural Okrug

Population (2010 Census)
  - Total: 0
  - Estimate (2021): 0 )

Municipal status
  - Municipal district: Verkhnevilyuysky Municipal District
  - Rural settlement: Surguluksky Rural Settlement
- Time zone: UTC+
- Postal code: 678242
- OKTMO ID: 98614467106

Keng-Kyuyol (Russian: Кенг-Кюёль; Yakut: Киэҥ Күөл, Kieŋ Küöl) is a rural locality (a selo), one of two settlements, in addition to Bagadya, in Botulunsky Rural Okrug of Verkhnevilyuysky District in the Sakha Republic, Russia. It is located 161 kilometers (100 mi) from Verkhnevilyuysk, the administrative center of the district and 11 kilometers (6.8 mi) from Bagadya. Its population as of the 2010 Census was 0, the same as recorded during the 2002 Census.
