= Verkhnevilyuysk Airport =

- IATA: VHV; ICAO: UENI; LID: ВХВ

Summary
- Airport type: Public
- Serves: Verkhnevilyuysk, Verkhnevilyuysky District, Sakha Republic, Russia
- Coordinates: 63°27′33″N 120°16′35″E

Maps
- Sakha Republic in Russia

- Location of the airport in the Sakha Republic

Runways
Direction	Length		Surface
Direction	m	ft	Surface
04/22	1,400	4,593	Asphalt
- Sources: GCM, STV

Verkhnevilyuysk Airport (Russian: Аэропорт Верхневилюйск) (IATA: VHV, ICAO: UENI) is an airport serving the urban locality of Verkhnevilyuysk, Verkhnevilyuysky District, in the Sakha Republic of Russia.

== Reconstruction ==
In 2019, as part of a comprehensive plan for the modernisation and expansion of the main infrastructure, work began on the reconstruction of the airport, which was completed at the beginning of 2021. The total amount of financing for the project amounted to 283.3 million roubles. The service and passenger building, built in 1961, which does not meet the requirements of federal aviation regulations, and the worn-out consumable warehouse for fuel and lubricants were demolished and rebuilt. In the passenger building, whose capacity is 35 passengers per hour, there is a buffet, a mother and child room, an inspection area, a room for storing seized luggage and a waiting area. The consumable warehouse can store 240 cubic meters of fuels and lubricants. A fence with a checkpoint has been created. The runway has a dirt surface.

== Airlines and destinations ==
Airlines	Destinations
Polar Airlines	Yakutsk

== See also ==
- List of airports in Russia
