= Kyotyordyokh =

Kyotyordyokh Кётёрдёх Көтөрдөөх (Sakha)
- Selo
- Interactive map of Kyotyordyokh
- Location of Kyotyordyokh Kyotyordyokh (Sakha Republic)
- Coordinates: 64°15′05″N 119°46′04″E
- Country: Russia
- Federal subject: Sakha Republic
- Administrative district: Verkhnevilyuysky District
- Rural okrugSelsoviet: Botulunsky Rural Okrug

Population (2010 Census)
  - Total: 102
  - Estimate (2021): 91 (−10.8%)

Municipal status
  - Municipal district: Verkhnevilyuysky Municipal District
  - Rural settlement: Botulunsky Rural Settlement
- Time zone: UTC+
- Postal code: 678245
- OKTMO ID: 98614405106

Kyotyordyokh (Russian: Кётёрдёх; Yakut: Көтөрдөөх, Kötördööx) is a rural locality (a selo) in Botulunsky Rural Okrug of Verkhnevilyuysky District in the Sakha Republic, Russia, located 140 kilometers (87 mi) from Verkhnevilyuysk, the administrative center of the district, and 20 kilometers (12 mi) from Botulu, the administrative center of the rural okrug. Its population as of the 2010 Census was 102, of whom 55 were male and 47 female, down from 129 as recorded during the 2002 Census.
