= Tonguo =

Tonguo Тонгуо / Тоҥуо
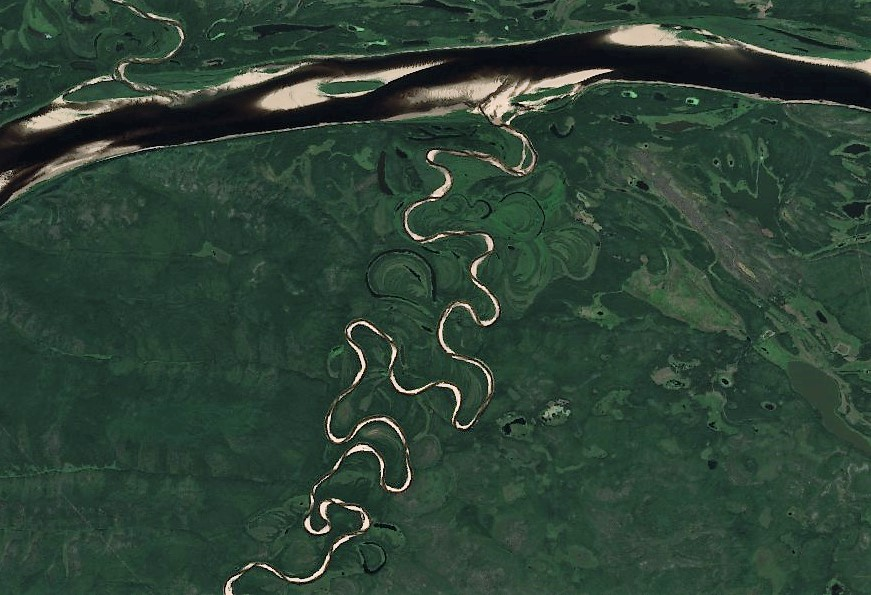
- Confluence with the Vilyuy Sentinel-2 image

- Mouth location in Yakutia, Russia

Location
- Country: Yakutia, Russia

Physical characteristics
- Source
  - location: Lena Plateau
  - coordinates: 62°23′29″N 121°03′13″E
- Mouth: Vilyuy
  - coordinates: 63°33′26″N 119°52′52″E
- Length: 317 km (197 mi)
- Basin size: 6,940 km^{2} (2,680 sq mi)

Basin features
- Progression: Vilyuy→ Lena→ Laptev Sea

The Tonguo (Russian: Тонгуо; Yakut: Тоҥуо) is a river in Yakutia (Sakha Republic), Russia. It is a right hand tributary of the Vilyuy, with a length of 317 kilometres (197 mi) and a drainage basin area of 6,940 square kilometres (2,680 mi^{2}).

The river flows across uninhabited territory of Verkhnevilyuysky District. Its confluence with the Vilyuy lies approximately 30 km (19 mi) to the northwest of Verkhnevilyuysk.

== Course ==
The Tonguo begins on the northern slopes of the Lena Plateau. It flows roughly in a northward and northwestward direction along most of its course. After it descends into the Central Yakutian Lowland it meanders strongly. In its last stretch the Tonguo bends to the NNE. Finally it joins the right bank of the Vilyuy 463 kilometres (288 mi) from its mouth. The river freezes in mid October and stays under ice until the second half of May.

The largest tributaries of the Tonguo are the 76 kilometres (47 mi) long Loglor (Логлор) from the right and the 94 kilometres (58 mi) long Tonguochan (Тоҥуочаан) from the left.

== See also ==
- List of rivers of Russia
- Pyotr Toburokov
