= Kyrykyy =

Kyrykyy Кырыкый
- Selo
- Interactive map of Kyrykyy
- Location of Kyrykyy Kyrykyy (Sakha Republic)
- Coordinates: 63°57′53″N 120°43′46″E
- Country: Russia
- Federal subject: Sakha Republic
- Administrative district: Verkhnevilyuysky District
- Rural okrugSelsoviet: Kyrykyysky Rural Okrug

Population (2010 Census)
  - Total: 442
  - Estimate (2021): 430 (−2.7%)

Administrative status
  - Capital of: Kyrykyysky Rural Okrug

Municipal status
  - Municipal district: Verkhnevilyuysky Municipal District
  - Rural settlement: Kyrykyysky Rural Settlement
  - Capital of: Kyrykyysky Rural Settlement
- Time zone: UTC+
- Postal code: 678235
- OKTMO ID: 98614406101

Kyrykyy (Russian: Кырыкый; Yakut: Кырыкый, Kırıkıy) is a rural locality (a selo), the only inhabited locality, and the administrative center of Kyrykyysky Rural Okrug of Verkhnevilyuysky District in the Sakha Republic, Russia, located 90 kilometers (56 mi) from Verkhnevilyuysk, the administrative center of the district. Its population as of the 2010 Census was 442, This figure is given for Kyrykyysky Rural Settlement, a municipal formation of Verkhnevilyuysky Municipal District. According to Law #173-Z 353-III, Kyrykyy is the only inhabited locality on the territory of this municipal formation of whom 218 were male and 224 female, down from 481 as recorded during the 2002 Census.

== Sources ==
- Official website of the Sakha Republic. Registry of the Administrative-Territorial Divisions of the Sakha Republic. Verkhnevilyuysky District. (in Russian)
- Государственное Собрание (Ил Тумэн) Республики Саха (Якутия). Закон №173-З №353-III от 30 ноября 2004 г. «Об установлении границ и о наделении статусом городского и сельского поселений муниципальных образований Республики Саха (Якутия)», в ред. Закона №1058-З №1007-IV от 25 апреля 2012 г. «О внесении изменений в Закон Республики Саха (Якутия) "Об установлении границ и о наделении статусом городского и сельского поселений муниципальных образований Республики Саха (Якутия)"». Вступил в силу со дня официального опубликования. Опубликован: "Якутия", №245, 31 декабря 2004 г. (State Assembly (Il Tumen) of the Sakha (Yakutia) Republic. Law #173-Z No. 353-III of November 30, 2004 On Establishing the Borders and on Granting the Urban and Rural Settlement Status to the Municipal Formations of the Sakha (Yakutia) Republic, as amended by the Law #1058-Z No. 1007-IV of April 25, 2012 On Amending the Law of the Sakha (Yakutia) Republic "On Establishing the Borders and on Granting the Urban and Rural Settlement Status to the Municipal Formations of the Sakha (Yakutia) Republic". Effective as of the day of the official publication.).
