= Bychchagdan =

Bychchagdan Быччагдан Быччыгдаан (Sakha)
- Selo
- Interactive map of Bychchagdan
- Location of Bychchagdan Bychchagdan (Sakha Republic)
- Coordinates: 63°54′N 120°04′E
- Country: Russia
- Federal subject: Sakha Republic
- Administrative district: Verkhnevilyuysky District
- Rural okrugSelsoviet: Dalyrsky Rural Okrug

Population (2010 Census)
  - Total: 95
  - Estimate (2021): 62 (−34.7%)

Municipal status
  - Municipal district: Verkhnevilyuysky Municipal District
  - Rural settlement: Dalyrsky Rural Settlement
- Time zone: UTC+
- Postal code: 678242
- OKTMO ID: 98614422106

Bychchagdan (Russian: Быччагдан; Yakut: Быччыгдаан, Bıççıgdaan) is a rural locality (a selo) in Dalyrsky Rural Okrug of Verkhnevilyuysky District in the Sakha Republic, Russia, located 85 kilometers (53 mi) from Verkhnevilyuysk, the administrative center of the district and 10 kilometers (6.2 mi) from Dalyr, the administrative center of the rural okrug. Its population as of the 2010 Census was 95, of whom 54 were male and 41 female, down from 101 as recorded during the 2002 Census.
