= Khoro, Verkhnevilyuysky District, Sakha Republic =

Khoro Хоро
- Selo
- Interactive map of Khoro
- Location of Khoro Khoro (Sakha Republic)
- Coordinates: 63°32′N 120°11′E
- Country: Russia
- Federal subject: Sakha Republic
- Administrative district: Verkhnevilyuysky District
- Rural okrugSelsoviet: Khorinsky Rural Okrug
- Founded: 1952

Population (2010 Census)
  - Total: 1,221
  - Estimate (2021): 1,214 (−0.6%)

Administrative status
  - Capital of: Khorinsky Rural Okrug

Municipal status
  - Municipal district: Verkhnevilyuysky Municipal District
  - Rural settlement: Khorinsky Rural Settlement
  - Capital of: Khorinsky Rural Settlement
- Time zone: UTC+
- Postal code: 678233
- OKTMO ID: 98614486101

Khoro (Russian: Хоро́; Yakut: Хоро, Xoro) is a rural locality (a selo), the only inhabited locality, and the administrative center of Khorinsky Rural Okrug of Verkhnevilyuysky District in the Sakha Republic, Russia, located 15 kilometers (9.3 mi) from Verkhnevilyuysk, the administrative center of the district. Its population as of the 2010 Census was 1,221, up from 1,131 recorded during the 2002 Census.
