= Khomustakh, Namsky Rural Okrug, Verkhnevilyuysky District, Sakha Republic =

Khomustakh Хомустах
- Selo

Other transcription(s)
  - Yakut: Хомустаах
- Interactive map of Khomustakh
- Location of Khomustakh Khomustakh (Sakha Republic)
- Coordinates: 63°29′N 120°32′E
- Country: Russia
- Federal subject: Sakha Republic
- Administrative district: Verkhnevilyuysky District
- Rural okrugSelsoviet: Namsky Rural Okrug

Population (2010 Census)
  - Total: 1,328
  - Estimate (2021): 1,320 (−0.6%)

Administrative status
  - Capital of: Namsky Rural Okrug

Municipal status
  - Municipal district: Verkhnevilyuysky Municipal District
  - Rural settlement: Namsky Rural Settlement
  - Capital of: Namsky Rural Settlement
- Time zone: UTC+
- Postal code: 678234
- OKTMO ID: 98614445101

Khomustakh (Russian: Хомустах; Yakut: Хомустаах, romanized: Xomustaax) is a rural locality (a selo), the only inhabited locality, and the administrative center of Namsky Rural Okrug of Verkhnevilyuysky District in the Sakha Republic, Russia, located 15 kilometers (9.3 mi) from Verkhnevilyuysk, the administrative center of the district. Its population as of the 2010 Census was 1,328, up from 1,311 recorded during the 2002 Census.
