= Tuobuya =

Tuobuya Туобуя
- Selo
- Interactive map of Tuobuya
- Location of Tuobuya Tuobuya (Sakha Republic)
- Coordinates: 61°59′02″N 122°03′20″E
- Country: Russia
- Federal subject: Sakha Republic
- Administrative district: Verkhnevilyuysky District
- Rural okrugSelsoviet: Tuobuyinsky Rural Okrug

Population (2010 Census)
  - Total: 338
  - Estimate (2021): 346 (+2.4%)

Administrative status
  - Capital of: Tuobuyinsky Rural Okrug

Municipal status
  - Municipal district: Verkhnevilyuysky Municipal District
  - Rural settlement: Tuobuyinsky Rural Settlement
  - Capital of: Tuobuyinsky Rural Settlement
- Time zone: UTC+
- Postal code: 678232
- OKTMO ID: 98614472101

Tuobuya (Russian: Туобуя; Yakut: Туобуйа, Tuobuya) is a rural locality (a selo), the only inhabited locality, and the administrative center of Tuobuyinsky Rural Okrug of Verkhnevilyuysky District in the Sakha Republic, Russia, located 250 kilometers (160 mi) from Verkhnevilyuysk, the administrative center of the district. Its population as of the 2017 Census was 332, of whom 175 were male and 163 female, down from 354 as recorded during the 2002 Census.
