= Chengere =

Chengere Ченгере
- Selo
- Interactive map of Chengere
- Location of Chengere Chengere (Sakha Republic)
- Coordinates: 64°10′56″N 120°10′19″E
- Country: Russia
- Federal subject: Sakha Republic
- Administrative district: Verkhnevilyuysky District
- Rural okrugSelsoviet: Magassky Rural Okrug

Population (2010 Census)
  - Total: 0
  - Estimate (2021): 0 )

Municipal status
  - Municipal district: Verkhnevilyuysky Municipal District
  - Rural settlement: Magassky Rural Settlement
- Time zone: UTC+
- Postal code: 678242
- OKTMO ID: 98614436106

Chengere (Russian: Ченгере; Yakut: Чэҥэрэ, Çeŋere) is a rural locality (a selo), one of two settlements, in addition to Kharbala, in Magassky Rural Okrug of Verkhnevilyuysky District in the Sakha Republic, Russia. It is located 125 kilometers (78 mi) from Verkhnevilyuysk, the administrative center of the district and 10 kilometers (6.2 mi) from Kharbala. Its population as of the 2010 Census was 0, the same as recorded during the 2002 Census.
