= Byuteydyakh, Verkhnevilyuysky District, Sakha Republic =

Byuteydyakh Бютейдях Бүтэйдээх (Sakha)
- Selo
- Interactive map of Byuteydyakh
- Location of Byuteydyakh Byuteydyakh (Sakha Republic)
- Coordinates: 63°46′48″N 120°28′58″E
- Country: Russia
- Federal subject: Sakha Republic
- Administrative district: Verkhnevilyuysky District
- Rural okrugSelsoviet: Dyullyukinsky Rural Okrug

Population (2010 Census)
  - Total: 8
  - Estimate (2021): 9 (+12.5%)

Municipal status
  - Municipal district: Verkhnevilyuysky Municipal District
  - Rural settlement: Dyullyukinsky Rural Settlement
- Time zone: UTC+
- Postal code: 678242
- OKTMO ID: 98614417106

Byuteydyakh (Russian: Бютейдях; Yakut: Бүтэйдээх, Büteydeex) is a rural locality (a selo), one of two settlements, in addition to Dyullyukyu, in Botulunsky Rural Okrug of Verkhnevilyuysky District in the Sakha Republic, Russia. It is located 55 kilometers (34 mi) from Verkhnevilyuysk, the administrative center of the district and 15 kilometers (9.3 mi) from Dyullyukyu. Its population as of the 2010 Census was 8, of whom 7 were male and 1 female, down from 17 as recorded during the 2002 Census.
