= Kharyyalakh, Verkhnevilyuysky District, Sakha Republic =

Kharyyalakh Харыялах Харыйалаах (Sakha)
- Selo
- Interactive map of Kharyyalakh
- Location of Kharyyalakh Kharyyalakh (Sakha Republic)
- Coordinates: 63°28′21″N 120°10′12″E
- Country: Russia
- Federal subject: Sakha Republic
- Administrative district: Verkhnevilyuysky District
- Rural okrugSelsoviet: Kentinsky Rural Okrug

Population (2010 Census)
  - Total: 780
  - Estimate (2021): 801 (+2.7%)

Administrative status
  - Capital of: Kentinsky Rural Okrug

Municipal status
  - Municipal district: Verkhnevilyuysky Municipal District
  - Rural settlement: Kentinsky Rural Settlement
  - Capital of: Kentinsky Rural Settlement
- Time zone: UTC+
- OKTMO ID: 98614429101

Kharyyalakh (Russian: Харыялах; Yakut: Харыйалаах, Xarıyalaax) is a rural locality (a selo), the only inhabited locality, and the administrative center of Kentinsky Rural Okrug of Verkhnevilyuysky District in the Sakha Republic, Russia, located 9 kilometers (5.6 mi) from Verkhnevilyuysk, the administrative center of the district. Its population as of the 2010 Census was 780, of whom 396 were male and 384 female, up from 725 as recorded during the 2002 Census.
