= Kharbala =

Kharbala Харбала
- Selo
- Interactive map of Kharbala
- Location of Kharbala Kharbala (Sakha Republic)
- Coordinates: 64°06′46″N 120°18′20″E
- Country: Russia
- Federal subject: Sakha Republic
- Administrative district: Verkhnevilyuysky District
- Rural okrugSelsoviet: Magassky Rural Okrug

Population (2010 Census)
  - Total: 538
  - Estimate (2021): 401 (−25.5%)

Administrative status
  - Capital of: Magassky Rural Okrug

Municipal status
  - Municipal district: Verkhnevilyuysky Municipal District
  - Rural settlement: Magassky Rural Settlement
  - Capital of: Magassky Rural Settlement
- Time zone: UTC+
- OKTMO ID: 98614436101

Kharbala (Russian: Харбала; Yakut: Харбала, Xarbala) is a rural locality (a selo), the administrative centre of and one of two settlements, in addition to Chengere, in Magassky Rural Okrug of Verkhnevilyuysky District in the Sakha Republic, Russia. It is located 115 kilometers (71 mi) from Verkhnevilyuysk, the administrative center of the district. Its population as of the 2010 Census was 538, of whom were 269 male and 269 female, down from 541 as recorded during the 2002 Census.
