= Kulusunnakh =

Kulusunnakh Кулусуннах Кулуһуннаах (Sakha)
- Selo
- Interactive map of Kulusunnakh
- Location of Kulusunnakh Kulusunnakh (Sakha Republic)
- Coordinates: 63°49′N 120°09′E
- Country: Russia
- Federal subject: Sakha Republic
- Administrative district: Verkhnevilyuysky District
- Rural okrugSelsoviet: Dalyrsky Rural Okrug

Population (2010 Census)
  - Total: 19
  - Estimate (2021): 37 (+94.7%)

Municipal status
  - Municipal district: Verkhnevilyuysky Municipal District
  - Rural settlement: Dalyrsky Rural Settlement
- Time zone: UTC+
- Postal code: 678241
- OKTMO ID: 98614422111

Kulusunnakh (Russian: Кулусуннах; Yakut: Кулуһуннаах, Kuluhunnaax) is a rural locality (a selo) in Dalyrsky Rural Okrug of Verkhnevilyuysky District in the Sakha Republic, Russia, located 66 kilometers (41 mi) from Verkhnevilyuysk, the administrative center of the district and 9 kilometers (5.6 mi) from Dalyr, the administrative center of the rural okrug. Its population as of the 2010 Census was 19, of whom 12 were male and 7 female, up from 13 as recorded during the 2002 Census.
