= Khomustakh, Khomustakhsky Rural Okrug, Verkhnevilyuysky District, Sakha Republic =

Khomustakh Хомустах
- Selo
- Interactive map of Khomustakh
- Location of Khomustakh Khomustakh (Sakha Republic)
- Coordinates: 63°42′33″N 120°46′19″E
- Country: Russia
- Federal subject: Sakha Republic
- Administrative district: Verkhnevilyuysky District
- Rural okrugSelsoviet: Khomustakhsky Rural Okrug

Population (2010 Census)
  - Total: 216
  - Estimate (2021): 220 (+1.9%)

Administrative status
  - Capital of: Khomustakhsky Rural Okrug

Municipal status
  - Municipal district: Verkhnevilyuysky Municipal District
  - Rural settlement: Khomustakhsky Rural Settlement
  - Capital of: Khomustakhsky Rural Settlement
- Time zone: UTC+
- OKTMO ID: 98614482101

Khomustakh (Russian: Хомустах; Yakut: Хомустаах, romanized: Xomustaax) is a rural locality (a selo), the only inhabited locality, and the administrative center of Khomustakhsky Rural Okrug of Verkhnevilyuysky District in the Sakha Republic, Russia, located 55 kilometers (34 mi) from Verkhnevilyuysk, the administrative center of the district. Its population as of the 2010 Census was 216, of whom 112 were male and 104 female, up from 210 as recorded during the 2002 Census.
