= Kyul =

Kyul Кюль
- Selo
- Interactive map of Kyul
- Location of Kyul Kyul (Sakha Republic)
- Coordinates: 63°32′38″N 121°01′10″E
- Country: Russia
- Federal subject: Sakha Republic
- Administrative district: Verkhnevilyuysky District
- Rural okrugSelsoviet: Kharbalakhsky Rural Okrug

Population (2010 Census)
  - Total: 548
  - Estimate (2021): 588 (+7.3%)

Administrative status
  - Capital of: Kharbalakhsky Rural Okrug

Municipal status
  - Municipal district: Verkhnevilyuysky Municipal District
  - Rural settlement: Kharbalakhsky Rural Settlement
  - Capital of: Kharbalakhsky Rural Settlement
- Time zone: UTC+
- Postal code: 678236
- OKTMO ID: 98614478101

Kyul (Russian: Кюль; Yakut: Күл, Kül) is a rural locality (a selo), the only inhabited locality, and the administrative center of Kharbalakhsky Rural Okrug of Verkhnevilyuysky District in the Sakha Republic, Russia, located 40 kilometers (25 mi) from Verkhnevilyuysk, the administrative center of the district. Its population as of the 2010 Census was 548, of whom 272 were male and 276 female, up from 505 as recorded during the 2002 Census.
