= Botulu =

Botulu Ботулу Боотулу (Sakha)
- Selo
- Interactive map of Botulu
- Location of Botulu Botulu (Sakha Republic)
- Coordinates: 64°08′10″N 119°46′10″E
- Country: Russia
- Federal subject: Sakha Republic
- Administrative district: Verkhnevilyuysky District
- Rural okrugSelsoviet: Botulunsky Rural Okrug

Population (2010 Census)
  - Total: 815
  - Estimate (2021): 687 (−15.7%)

Administrative status
  - Capital of: Botulunsky Rural Okrug

Municipal status
  - Municipal district: Verkhnevilyuysky Municipal District
  - Rural settlement: Botulunsky Rural Settlement
  - Capital of: Botulunsky Rural Settlement
- Time zone: UTC+
- Postal code: 678245
- OKTMO ID: 98614405101

Botulu (Russian: Ботулу; Yakut: Боотулу, Bootulu) is a rural locality (a selo), the administrative centre of and one of two settlements, in addition to Kyotyordyokh, in Botulunsky Rural Okrug of Verkhnevilyuysky District in the Sakha Republic, Russia. It is located 120 kilometers (75 mi) from Verkhnevilyuysk, the administrative center of the district. Its population as of the 2010 Census was 815; down from 860 recorded in the 2002 Census.
