= Dalyr =

Dalyr Далыр Далыр (Sakha)
- Selo
- Interactive map of Dalyr
- Location of Dalyr Dalyr (Sakha Republic)
- Coordinates: 63°52′13″N 120°15′04″E
- Country: Russia
- Federal subject: Sakha Republic
- Administrative district: Verkhnevilyuysky District
- Rural okrugSelsoviet: Dalyrsky Rural Okrug

Population (2010 Census)
  - Total: 888
  - Estimate (2021): 744 (−16.2%)

Administrative status
  - Capital of: Dalyrsky Rural Okrug

Municipal status
  - Municipal district: Verkhnevilyuysky Municipal District
  - Rural settlement: Dalyrsky Rural Settlement
  - Capital of: Dalyrsky Rural Settlement
- Time zone: UTC+
- Postal code: 678242
- OKTMO ID: 98614422101

Dalyr (Russian: Далыр; Yakut: Далыр, Dalır) is a rural locality (a selo), the administrative centre of and one of three settlements, in addition to Bychchagdan and Kulusunnakh, in Dalyrsky Rural Okrug of Verkhnevilyuysky District in the Sakha Republic, Russia. It is located 75 kilometers (47 mi) from Verkhnevilyuysk, the administrative center of the district. Its population as of the 2010 Census was 888, of whom 439 were male and 449 female, up from 840 as recorded during the 2002 Census.
