= Bagadya, Verkhnevilyuysky District, Sakha Republic =

Bagadya Багадя
- Selo
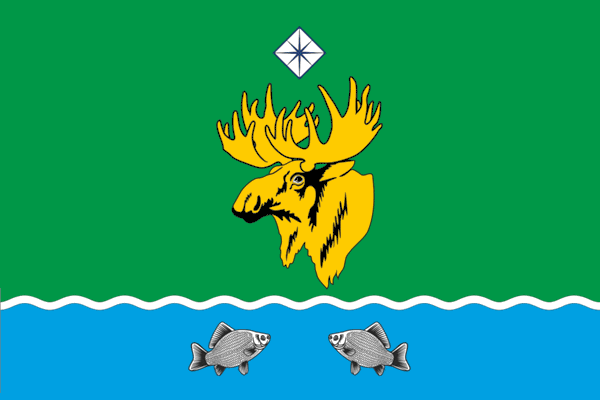
- Flag
- Interactive map of Bagadya
- Location of Bagadya Bagadya (Sakha Republic)
- Coordinates: 64°19′47″N 119°44′38″E
- Country: Russia
- Federal subject: Sakha Republic
- Administrative district: Verkhnevilyuysky District
- Rural okrugSelsoviet: Surguluksky Rural Okrug

Population (2010 Census)
  - Total: 460
  - Estimate (2021): 335 (−27.2%)

Administrative status
  - Capital of: Surguluksky Rural Okrug

Municipal status
  - Municipal district: Verkhnevilyuysky Municipal District
  - Rural settlement: Surguluksky Rural Settlement
  - Capital of: Surguluksky Rural Settlement
- Time zone: UTC+
- Postal code: 678244
- OKTMO ID: 98614467101

Bagadya (Russian: Багадя; Yakut: Баҕадьа, Bağaca) is a rural locality (a selo), the administrative centre of and one of two settlements, in addition to Keng-Kyuyol, in Surguluksky Rural Okrug of Verkhnevilyuysky District in the Sakha Republic, Russia. It is located 150 kilometers (93 mi) from Verkhnevilyuysk, the administrative center of the district. Its population as of the 2010 Census was 460, of whom 237 were male and 223 female, down from 522 as recorded during the 2002 Census.
