= Arylakh, Kobyaysky District, Sakha Republic =

Arylakh Арылах
- Selo
- Interactive map of Arylakh
- Location of Arylakh Arylakh (Sakha Republic)
- Coordinates: 63°45′N 123°57′E
- Country: Russia
- Federal subject: Sakha Republic
- Administrative district: Kobyaysky District
- Rural okrugSelsoviet: Luchcheginsky 1-y Rural Okrug

Population
  - Estimate (2021): 125 )

Municipal status
  - Municipal district: Kobyaysky Municipal District
  - Rural settlement: Luchcheginsky 1-y Rural Settlement
- Time zone: UTC+
- Postal code: 678314
- OKTMO ID: 98624434106

Arylakh (Russian: Арылах; Yakut: Арыылаах, Arıılaax) is a rural locality (a selo) in Luchcheginsky 1-y Rural Okrug of Kobyaysky District in the Sakha Republic, Russia, located 300 kilometers (190 mi) from Sangar, the administrative center of the district and 15 kilometers (9.3 mi) from Bagadya, the administrative center of the rural okrug. Its population as of the 2002 Census was 91.
