= Tamalakan =

Tamalakan Тамалакан
- Selo

Other transcription(s)
  - Yakut: Тамалакаан
- Interactive map of Tamalakan
- Location of Tamalakan Tamalakan (Sakha Republic)
- Coordinates: 63°30′51″N 120°50′34″E
- Country: Russia
- Federal subject: Sakha Republic
- Administrative district: Verkhnevilyuysky District
- Rural okrugSelsoviet: Tamalakansky Rural Okrug

Population (2010 Census)
  - Total: 643
  - Estimate (2021): 590 (−8.2%)

Administrative status
  - Capital of: Tamalakansky Rural Okrug

Municipal status
  - Municipal district: Verkhnevilyuysky Municipal District
  - Rural settlement: Tamalakansky Rural Settlement
  - Capital of: Tamalakansky Rural Settlement
- Time zone: UTC+
- Postal code: 678247
- OKTMO ID: 98614469101

Tamalakan (Russian: Тамалакан; Yakut: Тамалакаан, romanized: Tamalakaan) is a rural locality (a selo), the only inhabited locality, and the administrative center of Tamalakansky Rural Okrug of Verkhnevilyuysky District in the Sakha Republic, Russia, located 30 kilometers (19 mi) from Verkhnevilyuysk, the administrative center of the district. Its population as of the 2010 Census was 643, up from 633 recorded during the 2002 Census.
