= Sayylyk, Verkhnevilyuysky District, Sakha Republic =

Sayylyk Сайылык
- Selo
- Interactive map of Sayylyk
- Location of Sayylyk Sayylyk (Sakha Republic)
- Coordinates: 63°50′N 120°04′E
- Country: Russia
- Federal subject: Sakha Republic
- Administrative district: Verkhnevilyuysky District
- Rural okrugSelsoviet: Meyiksky Rural Okrug

Population (2010 Census)
  - Total: 621
  - Estimate (2021): 544 (−12.4%)

Administrative status
  - Capital of: Meyiksky Rural Okrug

Municipal status
  - Municipal district: Verkhnevilyuysky Municipal District
  - Rural settlement: Meyiksky Rural Settlement
  - Capital of: Meyiksky Rural Settlement
- Time zone: UTC+
- Postal code: 678241
- OKTMO ID: 98614440101

Sayylyk (Russian: Сайылык; Yakut: Сайылык, Sayılık) is a rural locality (a selo) and the administrative center of Meyiksky Rural Okrug of Verkhnevilyuysky District in the Sakha Republic, Russia, located 85 kilometers (53 mi) from Verkhnevilyuysk, the administrative center of the district. Its population as of the 2010 Census was 621; down from 657 recorded in the 2002 Census.
