= Balagannakh, Verkhnevilyuysky District, Sakha Republic =

Balagannakh Балаганнах Балаҕаннаах (Sakha)
- Selo
- Interactive map of Balagannakh
- Location of Balagannakh Balagannakh (Sakha Republic)
- Coordinates: 63°32′N 120°36′E
- Country: Russia
- Federal subject: Sakha Republic
- Administrative district: Verkhnevilyuysky District
- Rural okrugSelsoviet: Balagannakhsky Rural Okrug

Population (2010 Census)
  - Total: 335
  - Estimate (2021): 300 (−10.4%)

Administrative status
  - Capital of: Balagannakhsky Rural Okrug

Municipal status
  - Municipal district: Verkhnevilyuysky Municipal District
  - Rural settlement: Balagannakhsky Rural Settlement
  - Capital of: Balagannakhsky Rural Settlement
- Time zone: UTC+
- Postal code: 678234
- OKTMO ID: 98614402101

Balagannakh (Russian: Балаганнах; Yakut: Балаҕаннаах, Balağannaax) is a rural locality (a selo), the only inhabited locality, and the administrative center of Balagannakhsky Rural Okrug of Verkhnevilyuysky District in the Sakha Republic, Russia, located 22 kilometers (14 mi) from Verkhnevilyuysk, the administrative center of the district. Its population as of the 2010 Census was 335, down from 353 recorded during the 2002 Census.
