= Dyullyukyu =

Dyullyukyu Дюллюкю Дүллүкү (Sakha)
- Selo
- Interactive map of Dyullyukyu
- Location of Dyullyukyu Dyullyukyu (Sakha Republic)
- Coordinates: 63°41′20″N 120°28′29″E
- Country: Russia
- Federal subject: Sakha Republic
- Administrative district: Verkhnevilyuysky District
- Rural okrugSelsoviet: Dyullyukinsky Rural Okrug

Population (2010 Census)
  - Total: 1,251
  - Estimate (2021): 1,109 (−11.4%)

Administrative status
  - Capital of: Dyullyukinsky Rural Okrug

Municipal status
  - Municipal district: Verkhnevilyuysky Municipal District
  - Rural settlement: Dyullyukinsky Rural Settlement
  - Capital of: Dyullyukinsky Rural Settlement
- Time zone: UTC+
- Postal code: 678240
- OKTMO ID: 98614417101

Dyullyukyu (Russian: Дюллюкю; Yakut: Дүллүкү, Düllükü) is a rural locality (a selo) and the administrative center of Dyullyukinsky Rural Okrug of Verkhnevilyuysky District in the Sakha Republic, Russia, located 40 kilometers (25 mi) from Verkhnevilyuysk, the administrative center of the district. Its population as of the 2010 Census was 1,251, of whom 604 were male and 647 female, up from 1,173 as recorded during the 2002 Census.
