= Andreyevskaya, Kharovsky District, Vologda Oblast =

Andreyevskaya Андреевская
- Village
- Location within Vologda Oblast Location within Russia
- Coordinates: 60°10′N 39°33′E
- Country: Russia
- Region: Vologda Oblast
- District: Kharovsky District
- Time zone: UTC+3:00

Andreyevskaya (Russian: Андреевская) is a rural locality (a village) in Kumzerskoye Rural Settlement, Kharovsky District, Vologda Oblast, Russia. The population was 2 as of 2002.

== Geography ==
Andreyevskaya is located 55 km (34 mi) northwest of Kharovsk (the district's administrative centre) by road. Pashinskaya is the nearest rural locality.
