= Andreyevskaya, Ust-Kubinsky District, Vologda Oblast =

Andreyevskaya Андреевская
- Village
- Location within Vologda Oblast Location within Russia
- Coordinates: 60°03′N 39°04′E
- Country: Russia
- Region: Vologda Oblast
- District: Ust-Kubinsky District
- Time zone: UTC+3:00

Andreyevskaya (Russian: Андреевская) is a rural locality (a village) in Bogorodskoye Rural Settlement, Ust-Kubinsky District, Vologda Oblast, Russia. The population was 7 as of 2002.

== Geography ==
The distance to Ustye is 73 km, to Bogorodskoye is 13 km. Kuznecheyevskaya is the nearest rural locality.
