= Andreyevskaya, Krasnoborsky District, Arkhangelsk Oblast =

Andreyevskaya Андреевская
- Village
- Location within Arkhangelsk Oblast Location within Russia
- Coordinates: 61°42′N 45°24′E
- Country: Russia
- Region: Arkhangelsk Oblast
- District: Krasnoborsky District
- Time zone: UTC+3:00

Andreyevskaya (Russian: Андреевская) is a rural locality (a village) in Cherevkovskoye Rural Settlement of Krasnoborsky District, Arkhangelsk Oblast, Russia. The population was 111 as of 2010.

== Geography ==
Andreyevskaya is located 35 km northwest of Krasnoborsk (the district's administrative centre) by road. Verkhnyaya Sergiyevskaya is the nearest rural locality.
