= Andreyevsky, Sakha Republic =

Andreyevsky Андреевский Андреевскай (Yakut)
- Selo
- Interactive map of Andreyevsky
- Location of Andreyevsky Andreyevsky (Sakha Republic)
- Coordinates: 63°26′N 120°19′E
- Country: Russia
- Federal subject: Sakha Republic
- Administrative district: Verkhnevilyuysky District
- Rural okrugSelsoviet: Yedyugeysky Rural Okrug

Population (2010 Census)
  - Total: 2,229
  - Estimate (2021): 2,507 (+12.5%)

Administrative status
  - Capital of: Yedyugeysky Rural Okrug

Municipal status
  - Municipal district: Verkhnevilyuysky Municipal District
  - Rural settlement: Yedyugeysky Rural Settlement
  - Capital of: Yedyugeysky Rural Settlement
- Time zone: UTC+
- Postal code: 678230
- OKTMO ID: 98614423101

Andreyevsky (Russian: Андре́евский; Yakut: Андреевскай) is a rural locality (a selo) and the administrative center of Yedyugeysky Rural Okrug of Verkhnevilyuysky District in the Sakha Republic, Russia, located 1 kilometer (0.62 mi) from Verkhnevilyuysk, the administrative center of the district. Its population as of the 2010 Census was 2,229, up from 1,992 recorded during the 2002 Census.
