= Antanas Andrijauskas =

Lithuanian habilitated doctor

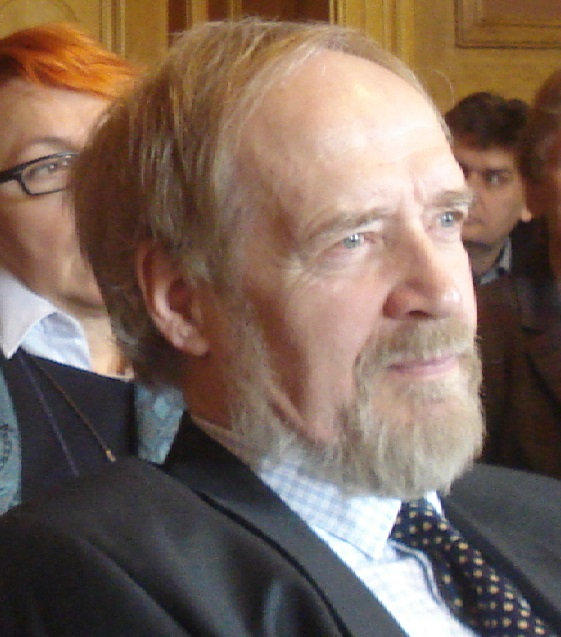
- Andrijauskas in 2015
- Born: 3 November 1948 (age 77); Kaunas, Lithuanian SSR, Soviet Union

Philosophical work
- Era: 20th-century philosophy
- Region: Western philosophy

Antanas Andrijauskas (born 3 November 1948) is a Lithuanian habilitated doctor and college professor. He is the senior researcher at the Department of Comparative Culture Studies at the Culture, Philosophy, and Arts Research Institute at Vilnius University and the Vilnius Academy of Fine Arts. Andrijauskas is the president of the Lithuanian Aesthetic Association and a member of the Lithuanian Academy of Sciences.

== Early life and education ==
Antanas Andrijauskas was born in Kaunas, Lithuania, on 3 November 1948. In 1972, he won first place in the International Young Scientists Competition. He graduated from Lomonosov Moscow State University with a degree in philosophy in 1978. In 1990, he defended his habilitated doctoral dissertation. From 1981–1982, he studied at the University of Paris-Sorbonne and the Collège de France, and in 1998, he conducted research at the University of Paris-X Nanterre Centre de Recherches Sur L’art. He has lectured as a visiting professor across the world at other various institutions of higher education.

== Career ==
Andrijauskas is known for his works in the humanities and has authored 28 monographs, 55 compiled books, and over 650 scientific articles in various languages. Additionally, he has founded and is the editor-in-chief of seven academic publications and is a member of the editorial boards of seven Lithuanian and international journals. For the series of scholarly works Comparative Research into Culture, Philosophy, Aesthetics, and Art, he was awarded the National Prize for Lithuanian Scholarship in 2003.

== Bibliography ==
=== Books ===
- Andrijauskas, Antanas (1990). Meno filosofija: Kritinė XVIII-XX a. koncepcijų analizė [Philosophy of Art: A Critical Analysis of 18th-20th Century Conceptions.]. Vilnus: Mintis. p. 312, ISBN 5-417-00335-2
- — (1995). Grožis ir menas. Estetika ir meno filosofijos idėjų istorija: Rytai-Vakarai [Beauty and Art. History of Ideas of Aesthetics and Philosophy of Art: East-West.]. Vilnus: VDA leidykla. p. 702
- — (1996). Grožis ir menas. Estetika ir meno filosofijos idėjų istorija: Rytai-Vakarai (2nd ed.). [Beauty and Art. History of Ideas of Aesthetics and Philosophy of Art: East-West.]. Vilnius: VDA leidykla. p. 707.
- — (1999). Civilizacijos teorijos metamorfozės ir komparatyvizmo idėjų sklaida [Changing Theories of Civilizition and the Spread of the Idea of Comparative Studies.]. Vilnius: Gervelė. p. 156, ISBN 9986-638-12-7
- — (2000). Kultūros universumas: morfologinės analizės prolegomenai [The Universe of Culture: Prolegomena to Morphological Analysis.]. Vilnius: Gervelė. p. 165, ISBN 9986-638-19-4
- — (2001). Andrijauskas A. Tradicinė japonų estetika ir menas. [Traditional Japanese Aesthetics and Art.]. Vilnius: Vaga. p. 670, ISBN 978-5-415-01562-7
- — (2001). Orientalistika ir komparatyvistinės studijos [Oriental and Comparative Studies.]. Vilnius:Gervelė. p. 168, ISBN 9986-638-23-2
- — (2001). Lyginamoji civilizacijos idėjų istorija [A Comparative History of the Idea of Civilization.]. Vilnius: VDA leidykla. p. 628, ISBN 9986-571-74-X
- — (2002). Istorinė Rytų ir Vakarų civilizacijų santykių raida [The Historical Evolution of Relations between Eastern and Western Civilizations.]. Vilnius: Gervelė. p. 195, ISBN 9986-638-36-4
- — (2003). Kultūrologijos istorija ir teorija. [The History and Theory of Cultural Studies.]. Vilnius: VDA leidykla. p. 635, ISBN 9986-571-91-X
- (—2004). Kultūros, filosofijos ir meno profiliai (Rytai-Vakarai-Lietuva) [Profiles of Culture, Philosophy, and Art (East-West-Lithuania)]. Vilnius: Gervelė, p. 623, ISBN 9986-638-41-0
- — (2006), Komparatyvistinė vizija:Rytų estetika ir meno filosofija. [Comparative Vision: Aesthetics and Art Philosophy of the Esat], KFMI l-kla. Vilnius: KFMI l-kla, p. 138, ISSN 1822-3192
- — (2006), et al. Lietuviškojo europietiškumo raida: dabarties ir ateities iššūkiai. [The Development of Lithuanian Europeanness: Challenges of Present and Future]. Vilnius: KFMI l-kla.. p. 288., ISBN 9986-638-71-2
- — (2006). Komparatyvistinė vizija:Rytų estetika ir meno filosofija. [Comparative Vision: Aesthetics and Art Philosophy of the East.] Vilnius: KFMI l-kla. p. 138, ISBN 978-9986-638-84-1 ISSN 1822-3192
- — (2008). Litvakų dailė L’école de Paris aplinkoje [Litvak Art in the Context of L’école de Paris.]. Vilnius: Vilniaus aukciono biblioteka, Meno rinka. p. 312, ISBN 978-609-8014-00-6
- — (2008). Litvak Art in the Context of L’école de Paris. Vilnius: Vilniaus aukciono biblioteka, Meno rinka. p. 312, ISBN 978-609-8014-01-3
- — (2010). Neklasikinės ir postmodernistinės filosofijos metamorfozės. [Metamorphoses of Non-classical and Postmodern Philosophy.]. Vilnius: Vilniaus aukciono biblioteka, Meno rinka. p. 648, ISBN 978-609-8014-06-8
- — (2014). Adomas Galdikas: Lyrinės abstrakcijos erdvių link. [Adomas Galdikas: A Winding Path to the Expanses of Lyrical Abstraction.]. Vilnius: Vilniaus aukciono biblioteka, Meno rinka. p. 336, ISBN 978-609-8014-14-3
- — (2015). Amžinybės ilgesys: Tradicinė indų kultūra, estetika ir menas. [The Nostalgy of Eternity: Traditional Indian Culture, Aesthetics and Art.]. Vilnius: LKTI l-kla. p. 608, ISBN 978-9955-868-75-0
- — (2015). Vaizduotės erdvės: Tradicinė kinų estetika ir menas. [Spaces of Imagination: Traditional Chinese Aesthetics and Art.]. Vilnius: LKTI l-kla. p. 608, ISBN 978-9955-868-80-4
- — (2017). Artimųjų Rytų, Indijos ir Islamo pasaulių estetika ir meno teorija [Aesthetics and Art Theory of the Near East, India, and the Islamic Words]. Vilnius: LKTI l-kla. p. 720, ISBN 978-9955-868-95-8
- — (2017). Rytų Azijos tradicinė estetika ir meno teorija [Far East Traditional Aesthetics and Art Theory]. Vilnius: LKTI l-kla p. 720, ISBN 978-9955-868-96-5
- — (2017). Vakarų estetika ir meno filosofija [Western Aesthetics and the Philosophy of Art]. Vilnius: LKTI l-kla. p. 720, ISBN 978-9955-868-97-2
- —, and Konstantinas Andrijauskas (2018). Civilizacijos istorijos metamorfozės: Komparatyvistinis požiūris į neeuropinį pasaulį. [Metamorphoses in the History of Civilization: A Comparative Analysis of the Non-European World.]. Vilnius: LKTI l-kla. p. 608, ISBN 978-609-8231-06-9
- — (2021). Meno psichologija: nuo kūrybingumo ištakų iki psichopatologijos. [Psychology of Art: from the Origins of Creativity to Psichopatology.]. Vilnius: LKTI l-kla. p. 840, ISSN 1822-3192, ISBN 978-609-8231-19-9
- — (2021). Teosofinės meno filosofijos idėjų atspindžiai Stabrausko ir Čiurlionio tapyboje [Reflections of Ideas of Theosophical Philosophy of Art in Painting by Stabrauskas and Čiurlionis]. Vilnius: LKTI l-kla. p. 288, ISBN 978-609-8231-34-2
- — (2022). Čiurlionio orientalizmo metamorfozės [Metamorphoses of Čiurlionis Orientalism]. Vilnius: LKTI l-kla. p.168, ISSN 2783-6274, ISBN 978-609-8231-39-7
- — (2023). Čiurlionis: Nesuprasto genijaus tragiškas skrydis. Pirmas tomas [Čiurlionis: The Trgic Flight of a Misunderstood Genius. First volume]. Vilnius: LKTI l-kla. p. 632, ISSN 2783-6274, ISBN 978-609-8231-68-7
- — (2024).. Čiurlionis: Nesuprasto genijaus tragiškas skrydis. Antras tomas [Čiurlionis: The Trgic Flight of a Misunderstood Genius. Second volume]. Vilnius: LKTI l-kla. p. 880, ISSN 2783-6274, ISBN 978-609-8231-83-0

=== Compilations ===
- Estetikos istorija. Antologija, t. 1: Senovės Rytai / Antika (1999) [History of Aesthetics. Anthology, vol. 1. Ancient East. Antiquity]. Vilnius: Pradai. p. 708, ISBN 9986-776-65-1 (1 tomas)
- Ortega y Gasset J. Mūsų laikų tema ir kitos esė (1999). Vilnius: Vaga. p. 549, ISBN 978-5-415-01453-8
- C. G., Jung. Psichoanalizė ir filosofija (1999) [Psychoanalysis and Philosophy]. Vilnius: Pradai. p. 439, ISBN 9986-778-71-6
- Rytai-Vakarai: Komparatyvistinės studijos – I (2002) [East – West: Comparative studies – I]. Vilnius: Vaga. p. 495, ISBN 5-415-01612-0
- Rytai-Vakarai. Komparatyvistinės studijos – II. Kultūrologija-7 (2002) [East – West: Comparative studies – II. Culturology – 7]. Vilnius: KFMI l-kla. p. 384, ISBN 9986-638-23-2
- Rytai-Vakarai. Komparatyvistinės studijos – III. Kultūrologija-8 [East – West: Comparative studies – III. Culturology – 8]. Vilnius: KFMI l-kla. p. 591, ISBN 9986-638-36-4
- Rytai-Vakarai: Kultūrų sąveika (2002) [East – West: Interactions of Cultures]. Vilnius: Lumen fondas. p. 357, ISBN 9986-721-43-1
- Estetikos ir meno filosofijos transformacijos (2005) [Transformations of Aesthetics and Philosophy of Art]. Vilnius: KFMI l-la. p. 700, ISBN 9955-699-25-6
- Rytai-Vakarai. Komparatyvistinės studijos – IV (2005) [East – West: Comparative studies – IV]. Vilnius: Kultūrologija-12, KFMI l-kla. p. 591, ISSN 1822-2242; ISBN 9986-638-68-2
- Egzistencijos paradoksai: Kierkegaardo filosofinės interpretacijos (2006) [The Paradoxes of Existence: Interpretations of Kierkegaard's Philosophy]. Vilnius: Versus Aureus. p. 336, ISSN 18222-6523; ISBN 978-9955-34-143-7
- Lietuviškojo europietiškumo raida: dabarties ir ateities iššūkiai (2006) [The Development of Lithuanian Europeaness: Challenges of Present and Future]. Vilnius: Kolektyvinė monografija, KFMI l-kla. p. 288, ISBN 9986-638-71-2
- Estetikos ir meno filosofijos teritorijų kaita (2006) [Alternation of Aesthetics and Philosophy of Art]. Vilnius: KFMI l-la. p. 600, ISSN 1822-3192; ISBN 9986-638-72-0
- Vytenis Lingys: tapyba, piešiniai (2006) [Vytenis Lingys: Paintings and Drawings]. Vilnius. p. 156, ISBN 9955-638-68-0
- Gyvenimo apologija: Nietzsche‘ės interpretacijos (2006) [Apologia of Life: Interpretations of Nietzsche's Philosophy]. Vilnius: Versus Aureus. p. 496, ISSN 18222-6523; ISBN 978-9955-699-70-5
- Komparatyvistinė Rytų ir Vakarų estetika (2006) [Comparative Eastern and Western Aesthetics], Vilnius: KFMI l-la, p. 543, ISSN 1822-3192; ISBN 978-9986-84-1
- Rytai-Vakarai. Komparatyvistinės studijos – V. Kultūrologija -14 (2006) [East – West: Comparative studies – V. Culturology -14]. Vilnius: KFMI l-kla. p. 511, ISSN 1822-2242; ISBN 9986-638-85-8
- Solomonas Teitelbaumas: tapyba, piešiniai (2007). Vilnius: Maldis, p. 111.
- Rytai-Vakarai. Komparatyvistinės studijos – VI (2007) [East – West: Comparative studies – VI]. Vilnius: KFMI l-kla. p. 496, ISSN 1822-2242; ISBN 9986-638-85-8
- Valios metafizika: Schopenhaurio filosofijos interpretacijos (2007) [Metaphysics of Will: Interpretations of Schopenhauer's Philosophy]. Vilnius: Versus Aureus, p. 528, ISSN 18222-6523; ISBN 978-9955-34-047-8
- Estetikos ir meno filosofijos probleminių laukų sąveika (2008) [Interactions of Problem Fields of Aesthetics and Philosophy of Art]. Vilnius: KFMI l-la. p. 544, ISBN 978-609-8231-35-9
- Rytai-Vakarai. Komparatyvistinės studijos – VII (2008) [East – West: Comparative studies – VII]. Vilnius: KFMI l-kla. p. 512, ISBN 978-9955-868-05-7
- Gyvybinis polėkis: Bergsono filosofijos interpretacijos (2008) [Élan Vitale: Interpretations of Bergson's Philosophy]. Vilnius: Versus Aureus, p. 537, ISSN 18222-6523; ISBN 978-9955-34-143-7
- Nacionalino tapatumo tęstinumas ir savikūra eurointegracijos sąlygomis (2008). Vilnius: Sudarė A. Andrijauskas, V. Rubavičius, Kronta, p. 288, ISBN 978-609-401-016-3
- Rytai-Vakarai. Komparatyvistinės studijos – VIII (2008) [East – West: Comparative studies – VIII]. Vilnius: KFMI l-kla. p. 432, ISBN 978-9955-868-26-2
- Žydų kultūra: istorija ir dabartis (2009) [Jewish Culture: History and the Present]. Vilnius: Kronta, p. 461, ISBN 978-609-401-068-2
- Postmodernizmo fenomeno interpretacijos (2009) [Interpretations of Postmodernism Phenomenon]. Vilnius: Versus aureus, p. 602, ISBN 978-9955-34-241-0
- Gamtos grožis V. A. Kaliūno kūriniuose (2010) [The Beauty of Nature in Kaliūnas‘ Art Works]. Vilnius: Bitutes. p. 108, ISBN 978-9986-439-48-0
- Rytai–Vakarai. Komparatyvistinės studijos – IX (2010) [East – West: Comparative studies – IX]. Vilnius: LKTI l–kla, p. 512, ISBN 978-9955-868-26-2
- Rytai–Vakarai. Komparatyvistinės studijos – X. Sigitas Geda: pasaulinės kultūros lietuvinimas (2010) [East – West: Comparative studies – X. Sigitas Geda: Lithuanianization of World Culture]. Vilnius: LKTI l–kla. p. 600, ISBN 978-9955-868-30-9
- Rytai–Vakarai. Komparatyvistinės studijos – XI. Kultūrų sąveikos (2011) [East – West: Comparative studies – XI. Interaction of Cultures]. Vilnius: LKTI l–kla. p. 592, ISBN 978-9955-868-37-8* Rytai–Vakarai. Komparatyvistinės studijos – XII Algio Uždavinio fenomenas (2012) [East – West: Comparative studies – XII. A Phenomenon of Algis Uždavinys]. Vilnius: LKTI l–kla. p. 576, ISBN 978-9955-868-55-2
- Lietuvos žydų kultūros paveldas: Kasdienybės pasaulis (2013) [Lithuanian Jewish Cultural Heritage: Everyday World]. Vilnius: LKTI L-la. p. 576, ISBN 978-9955-868-60-6
- Kultūrologija 19. Rytai-Vakarai. Komparatyvistinės studijos – XIII (2014) [East – West: Comparative studies – XIII. Culturology 19]. Vilnius: LKTI l-kla. p. 704, ISBN 978-9955-868-73-6
- Psichoanalizės fenomeno interpretacijos (2016) [Interpretations of the Phenomenon of Psychoanalysis]. Vilnius: Vilniaus aukciono biblioteka, Sudarė A. Andrijauskas, V. Rubavičius. p. 592, ISBN 978-609-8014-18-1
- Kultūrologija 20. Rytai-Vakarai. Komparatyvistinės studijos – XIV (2016) [East – West: Comparative studies – XIII. Culturology 20]. Vilnius: LKTI l-kla, Sudarė A. Andrijauskas. p. 608, ISBN 978-9955-868-90-3
- Soutine and L’école de Paris (2016). Shmuel Tatz's Art Collection. Edited by Antanas Andrijauskas. New York.
- Valentinas Algirdas Kaliūnas. Varėnos kraštas: Kūrybos versmės (2019) [Valentinas Algirdas Kaliūnas. The Land of Varėna]. Vilnius: Bitutės. p. 168, ISBN 978-9986-439-54-7
- Iššūkis metafizikai: Lietuviškos Heideggerio filosofjos interpretacijos (2019). [The Challenge to Metaphysics: Lithuanian Interpretations of Heidegger's Philosophy]. Vilnius: LKTI l-kla. p. 608, ISSN 1822-6523, ISBN 978-609-8231-17-5
- Albertas Gurskas. Kaligrafijos meno versmės: Tekstai Lietuvai (2020) [Albertas Gurskas. Sources of Calligraphy Art. Texts for Lithuania]. Vilnius: Sudarė A. Andrijauskas, Daliūtė Ivanauskaitė, Lietuvos Nacionalinis muziejus. p. 176, ISBN 978-609-478-037-0
- Meda Norbutaitė. Tapyba (2020) [Meda Norbutaitė. Painting]. Vilnius:Dailininkų sąjungos leidykla. p.288, ISBN 978-609-8154-17-7
- Comparative Culture Studies in Philosophy and Aesthetics. Guest-editor. – Antanas Andrijauskas // Dialogue and Universalism, Journal of the International Society for Universal Dialogue, Vol. XXX. No. 3/2020. – p. 300, ISSN 1234-5792
- Jonas Daniliauskas, Tarp baltų ėriukų. Tapyba. Piešiniai. (2021). Vilnius: LDS. p. 207, ISBN 978-609-8154-21-4
- Estetikos ir meno filosofijos tyrinėjimai. VII. Estetikos ir meno filosofijos teorinės problemos (2021) [Aesthetics and Philosophy of Art Studies. VII. Theoretical Problems of Aesthetics and Philosophy of Art]. Vilnius: LKTI. p. 416, ISSN 1822-3192
- Kruopis, Saulius . Meditacijos: Spalvų ir simbolių pasaulis. (2022) Meno albumas [Meditations: a World of Colors and Symbols. Art Album]. Vilnius: Petro Ofsetas. p. 240, ISBN 978-609-8271-02-7
- Vida Norkutė: Slėpininga akvarėlės meno magija (2022). [Vida Norkutė: The Mysterious Magic of Watercolor Art]. Vilnius: LKTI. p. 144, ISSN 2783-7165, ISBN 978-609-8231-42-7
- Estetikos, meno filosofijos ir meno psichologijos tarpdalykinės sąveikos (2022). [Interdisciplinary Interactions of Aesthetics, Philosophy of Art and Psychology of Art]. Vilnius: LKTI. p. 552, ISSN 1822-3192, ISBN 978-609-8231-45-8
- Gražina Vitartaitė: Atviras peizažas. (2022). [Gražina Vitartaitė: Open Landscape]. Vilnius: LKTI. p. 288, ISSN 2783-7165, ISBN 978-609-8231-51-9
- Kultūrologija 21. Rytai–Vakarai: komparatyvistinės studijos XV. (2022). [Culturology 21. East–West: Comparative Studies XV]. Vilnius: LKTI. p. 220, ISSN 1822-2242, ISBN 978-609-8231-52-6
- Raimundas Majauskas: Koloritinės harmonijos ilgesys (2023). [Raimundas Majauskas: The Longing for Color Harmony]. Vilnius: LKTI. p. 288, ISSN 2783-7165, ISBN 978-609-8231-55-7
- Raimondas Savickas: Metafizinė tikrovės interpretacija (2023). [Raimondas Savickas: Metaphysical Interpretation of Reality]. Vilnius: LKTI. p. 256, ISSN 2783-7165, ISBN 978-609-8231-67-0
- Arvydas Každailis: Autentiškų ištakų ieškojimas (2023). [Arvydas Každailis: The Search for Authentic Origins]. Vilnius: LKTI. p. 520, ISSN 2783-7165, ISBN 978-609-8231-69-4
- Egzistencializmo fenomeno intepretacijos (2024). [Interpretations of the Phenomenon of Existentialism]. Vilnius: LKTI. p. 560, ISBN 978-609-8231-84-7
- Jacques Chapiro. Paveikslai ir piešiniai. Shmuel Tatz kolekcija ( 2024). [Andrijauskas A., Kalesinskas Z. Jacques Chapiro. Paintings and Drawings. Shmuel Tatz Collection]. Raudondvaris: Kauno rajono muziejus p. 142.
