= Andreyevskaya, Vashkinsky District, Vologda Oblast =

Andreyevskaya Андреевская
- Village
- Location within Vologda Oblast Location within Russia
- Coordinates: 60°28′N 37°55′E
- Country: Russia
- Region: Vologda Oblast
- District: Vashkinsky District
- Time zone: UTC+3:00

Andreyevskaya (Russian: Андреевская) is a rural locality (a village) and the administrative center of Andreyevskoye Rural Settlement, Vashkinsky District, Vologda Oblast, Russia. The population was 201 as of 2002. There are 5 streets.

== Geography ==
Andreyevskaya is located 28 km north of Lipin Bor (the district's administrative centre) by road. Stanovaya is the nearest rural locality.
