= Andreyevsky, Republic of Bashkortostan =

Andreyevsky Андреевский
- Khutor
- Location within Bashkortostan Location within Russia
- Coordinates: 53°02′N 56°22′E
- Country: Russia
- Region: Bashkortostan
- District: Meleuzovsky District
- Time zone: UTC+5:00

Andreyevsky (Russian: Андреевский) is a rural locality (a khutor) in Alexandrovsky Selsoviet, Meleuzovsky District, Bashkortostan, Russia. The population was 26 as of 2010. There are 3 streets.

== Geography ==
Andreyevsky is located 48 km northeast of Meleuz (the district's administrative centre) by road. Nizhnetashevo is the nearest rural locality.
