= Andreyevskoye, Vologodsky District, Vologda Oblast =

Andreyevskoye Андреевское
- Village
- Location within Vologda Oblast Location within Russia
- Coordinates: 59°09′N 39°56′E
- Country: Russia
- Region: Vologda Oblast
- District: Vologodsky District
- Time zone: UTC+3:00

Andreyevskoye (Russian: Андреевское) is a rural locality (a village) in Podlesnoye Rural Settlement, Vologodsky District, Vologda Oblast, Russia. The population was 2 as of 2002.

== Geography ==
Andreyevskoye is located 9 km southeast of Vologda (the district's administrative centre) by road. Yarilovo is the nearest rural locality.
