= Andreyevskaya, Verkhovazhsky District, Vologda Oblast =

Andreyevskaya Андреевская
- Village
- Location within Vologda Oblast Location within Russia
- Coordinates: 60°46′N 42°03′E
- Country: Russia
- Region: Vologda Oblast
- District: Verkhovazhsky District

Population
  - Total: 11
- Time zone: UTC+3:00

Andreyevskaya (Russian: Андреевская) is a rural locality (a village) in Nizhne-Vazhskoye Rural Settlement, Verkhovazhsky District, Vologda Oblast, Russia. The population was 11 as of 2002.

== Geography ==
Andreyevskaya is located 3 km north of Verkhovazhye (the district's administrative centre) by road. Yakushevskaya is the nearest rural locality.
