= Andreyevskaya, Vytegorsky District, Vologda Oblast =

Andreyevskaya Андреевская
- Village
- Location within Vologda Oblast Location within Russia
- Coordinates: 60°55′N 36°48′E
- Country: Russia
- Region: Vologda Oblast
- District: Vytegorsky District
- Time zone: UTC+3:00

Andreyevskaya (Russian: Андреевская) is a rural locality (a village) in Devyatinskoye Rural Settlement, Vytegorsky District, Vologda Oblast, Russia. The population was 51 as of 2002.

== Geography ==
Andreyevskaya is located 25 km southeast of Vytegra (the district's administrative centre) by road. Veliky Dvor is the nearest rural locality.
