= Andreyevskoye, Sokolsky District, Vologda Oblast =

Andreyevskoye Андреевское
- Village
- Location within Vologda Oblast Location within Russia
- Coordinates: 59°36′N 41°11′E
- Country: Russia
- Region: Vologda Oblast
- District: Sokolsky District
- Time zone: UTC+3:00

Andreyevskoye (Russian: Андреевское) is a rural locality (a village) in Chuchkovskoye Rural Settlement, Sokolsky District, Vologda Oblast, Russia. The population was 13 as of 2002.

== Geography ==
The distance to Sokol is 80 km, to Chuchkovo is 3 km. Mamonkino is the nearest rural locality.
