= Andreyevskaya, Ivanovo Oblast =

Andreyevskaya Андреевская
- Village
- Location within Ivanovo Oblast Location within Russia
- Coordinates: 57°01′N 42°23′E
- Country: Russia
- Region: Ivanovo Oblast
- District: Lukhsky District
- Time zone: UTC+3:00

Andreyevskaya (Russian: Андреевская) is a rural locality (a village) in Lukhsky District, Ivanovo Oblast, Russia. Population: 35 (2010 census);

== Geography ==
This rural locality is located 8 kilometres (5.0 mi) from Lukh (the district's administrative centre), 86 kilometres (53 mi) from Ivanovo (capital of Ivanovo Oblast) and 321 kilometres (199 mi) from Moscow. Kurbatikha is the nearest rural locality.
