= Andreyevskoye (Krasnoselskoye Rural Settlement), Yuryev-Polsky District, Vladimir Oblast =

Andreyevskoye Андреевское
- Selo
- Location within Vladimir Oblast Location within Russia
- Coordinates: 56°26′N 39°35′E
- Country: Russia
- Region: Vladimir Oblast
- District: Yuryev-Polsky District
- Time zone: UTC+3:00

Andreyevskoye (Russian: Андреевское) is a rural locality (a selo) in Krasnoselskoye Rural Settlement, Yuryev-Polsky District, Vladimir Oblast, Russia. The population was 4 as of 2010.

== Geography ==
It is located on the Sega River, 8 km (5.0 mi) south-west from Yuryev-Polsky.
