= Andreyevskoye (Nebylovskoye Rural Settlement), Yuryev-Polsky District, Vladimir Oblast =

Andreyevskoye Андреевское
- Selo
- Location within Vladimir Oblast Location within Russia
- Coordinates: 56°22′N 40°02′E
- Country: Russia
- Region: Vladimir Oblast
- District: Yuryev-Polsky District
- Time zone: UTC+3:00

Andreyevskoye (Russian: Андре́евское) is a rural locality (a selo) in Nebylovskoye Rural Settlement, Yuryev-Polsky District, Vladimir Oblast, Russia. The population was 783 as of 2010.

== Geography ==
It is located on the Yakhroma River, 2 km east from Nebyloye, 27 km south-east from Yuryev-Polsky.
