= Andreyevskaya, Gus-Khrustalny District, Vladimir Oblast =

Andreyevskaya Андреевская
- Village
- Location within Vladimir Oblast Location within Russia
- Coordinates: 55°51′N 40°27′E
- Country: Russia
- Region: Vladimir Oblast
- District: Gus-Khrustalny District
- Time zone: UTC+3:00

Andreyevskaya (Russian: Андре́евская) is a rural locality (a village) in Posyolok Ivanishchi, Gus-Khrustalny District, Vladimir Oblast, Russia. The population was 24 as of (2021 census); 2 as of 2010.

== Geography ==
Andreyevskaya is located 45 km northwest of Gus-Khrustalny (the district's administrative centre) by road. Stepanovo is the nearest rural locality.
