= Andreyevsky (surname) =

Andreevsky, Andreevski, Andreyevsky is a surname of East and South Slavic origin. Feminine forms are Andreevskaya or Andreyevskaya.

Notable individuals with this surname include:

- Petre M. Andreevski (1934–2006), Macedonian poet
- Sergey Andreyevsky (1847–1918), Russian writer, poet, literary critic and lawyer

== See also ==
- Andreyevsky (rural locality), Russian rural localities
