= Andreyevskaya, Vozhegodsky District, Vologda Oblast =

Andreyevskaya Андреевская
- Village
- Location within Vologda Oblast Location within Russia
- Coordinates: 60°22′N 39°11′E
- Country: Russia
- Region: Vologda Oblast
- District: Vozhegodsky District
- Time zone: UTC+3:00

Andreyevskaya (Russian: Андреевская) is a rural locality (a village) in Beketovskoye Rural Settlement, Vozhegodsky District, Vologda Oblast, Russia. The population was 28 as of 2002.

== Geography ==
Andreyevskaya is located 76 km southwest of Vozhega (the district's administrative centre) by road. Voskresenskoye is the nearest rural locality.
