= Andreyevka, Solnechnogorsky District, Moscow Oblast =

Urban locality in Solnechnogorsky District of Moscow Oblast, Russia

Andreyevka Андреевка
- Work settlement
- Interactive map of Andreyevka
- Location of Andreyevka Andreyevka (Moscow Oblast)
- Coordinates: 55°58′53″N 37°07′44″E
- Country: Russia
- Federal subject: Moscow Oblast
- Administrative district: Solnechnogorsky District
- Elevation: 218 m (715 ft)

Population (2010 Census)
  - Total: 10,008
  - Estimate (2025): 10,506 (+5%)

Municipal status
  - Municipal district: Solnechnogorsky Municipal District
  - Urban settlement: Andreyevka Urban Settlement
  - Capital of: Andreyevka Urban Settlement
- Time zone: UTC+3 (MSK)
- Postal code: 141551
- OKTMO ID: 46771000056

Andreyevka (Russian: Андре́евка) is an urban locality (urban-type settlement) in Solnechnogorsky District of Moscow Oblast, Russia. Population: 10,008 (2010 census); 8,465 (2002 census);
