= Andreyevsky, Altai Krai =

Andreyevsky Андреевский
- Settlement
- Location within Altai Krai Location within Russia
- Coordinates: 51°06′N 82°49′E
- Country: Russia
- Region: Altai Krai
- District: Zmeinogorsky District
- Time zone: UTC+7:00

Andreyevsky (Russian: Андреевский) is a rural locality (a settlement) in Oktyabrsky Selsoviet, Zmeinogorsky District, Altai Krai, Russia. The population was 2 as of 2013. There is 1 street.

== Geography ==
Andreyevsky is located 96 km east of Zmeinogorsk (the district's administrative centre) by road. Bugryshikha is the nearest rural locality.
