= Bagadya, Kobyaysky District, Sakha Republic =

Bagadya Багадя
- Selo
- Location of Bagadya
- Location of Bagadya Bagadya (Sakha Republic)
- Coordinates: 63°42′49″N 123°46′46″E
- Country: Russia
- Federal subject: Sakha Republic
- Administrative district: Kobyaysky District
- Rural okrug: Luchcheginsky 1-y Rural Okrug

Population
  - Estimate (2002): 165

Administrative status
  - Capital of: Luchcheginsky 1-yRural Okrug

Municipal status
  - Municipal district: Kobyaysky Municipal District
  - Rural settlement: Luchcheginsky 1-y Rural Settlement
  - Capital of: Luchcheginsky 1-y Rural Settlement
- Time zone: UTC+9 (MSK+6)
- Postal code(s): 678314
- OKTMO ID: 98624434101

Bagadya (Russian: Багадя; Yakut: Баҕадьа, Bağaca) is a rural locality (a selo), the administrative centre of and one of two settlements, in addition to Arylakh, in Luchcheginsky 1-y Rural Okrug of Kobyaysky District in the Sakha Republic, Russia. It is located 315 kilometers (196 mi) from Sangar, the administrative center of the district. Its population as of the 2002 Census was 165.
