= Andreyevskoye, Privolzhsky District, Ivanovo Oblast =

Andreyevskoye Андреевское
- Village
- Location within Ivanovo Oblast Location within Russia
- Coordinates: 57°19′N 41°21′E
- Country: Russia
- Region: Ivanovo Oblast
- District: Privolzhsky District
- Time zone: UTC+3:00

Andreyevskoye (Russian: Андреевское) is a rural locality (a village) in Privolzhsky District, Ivanovo Oblast, Russia. Population: 39 (2010 census);

== Geography ==
This rural locality is located 7 kilometres (4.3 mi) from Privolzhsk (the district's administrative centre), 45 kilometres (28 mi) from Ivanovo (capital of Ivanovo Oblast) and 285 kilometres (177 mi) from Moscow. Fedorishche is the nearest rural locality.
