= Andreyevsky, Volgograd Oblast =

Andreyevsky Андреевский
- Khutor
- Location within Volgograd Oblast Location within Russia
- Coordinates: 50°56′N 42°40′E
- Country: Russia
- Region: Volgograd Oblast
- District: Novonikolayevsky District
- Time zone: UTC+4:00

Andreyevsky (Russian: Андреевский) is a rural locality (a khutor) in Khopyorskoye Rural Settlement, Novonikolayevsky District, Volgograd Oblast, Russia. The population was 73 as of 2010. There are 2 streets.

== Geography ==
Andreyevsky is located in steppe, on the Khopyorsko-Buzulukskaya Plain, on the left bank of the Kardail River, 51 km southeast of Novonikolayevsky (the district's administrative centre) by road. Novokardailsky is the nearest rural locality.
