= Andreyevskoye, Alexandrovsky District, Vladimir Oblast =

Andreyevskoye Андреевское
- Selo
- Location within Vladimir Oblast Location within Russia
- Coordinates: 56°24′N 39°00′E
- Country: Russia
- Region: Vladimir Oblast
- District: Alexandrovsky District
- Time zone: UTC+3:00

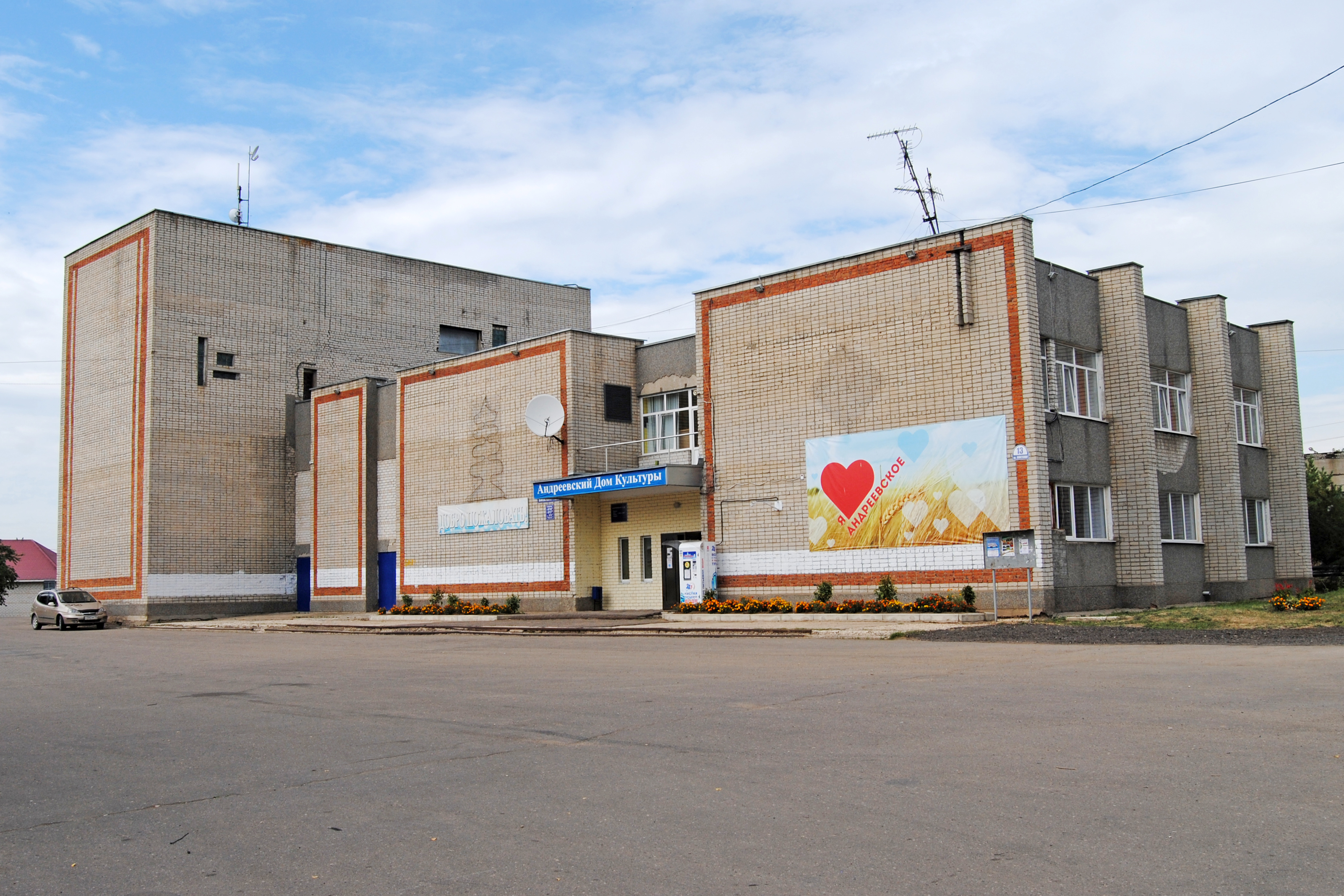

Andreyevskoye (Russian: Андре́евское) is a rural locality (a selo) and the administrative center of Andreyevskoye Rural Settlement, Alexandrovsky District, Vladimir Oblast, Russia. The population was 1,062 as of 2010. There are 19 streets.

== Geography ==
Andreyevskoye is located 17 km east of Alexandrov (the district's administrative centre) by road. Prokofyevo is the nearest rural locality.
