= Verkhnevilyuysky District =

Verkhnevilyuysky District Верхневилюйский улус (Russian)
- District

Other transcription(s)
  - Yakut: Үөһээ Бүлүү улууhа
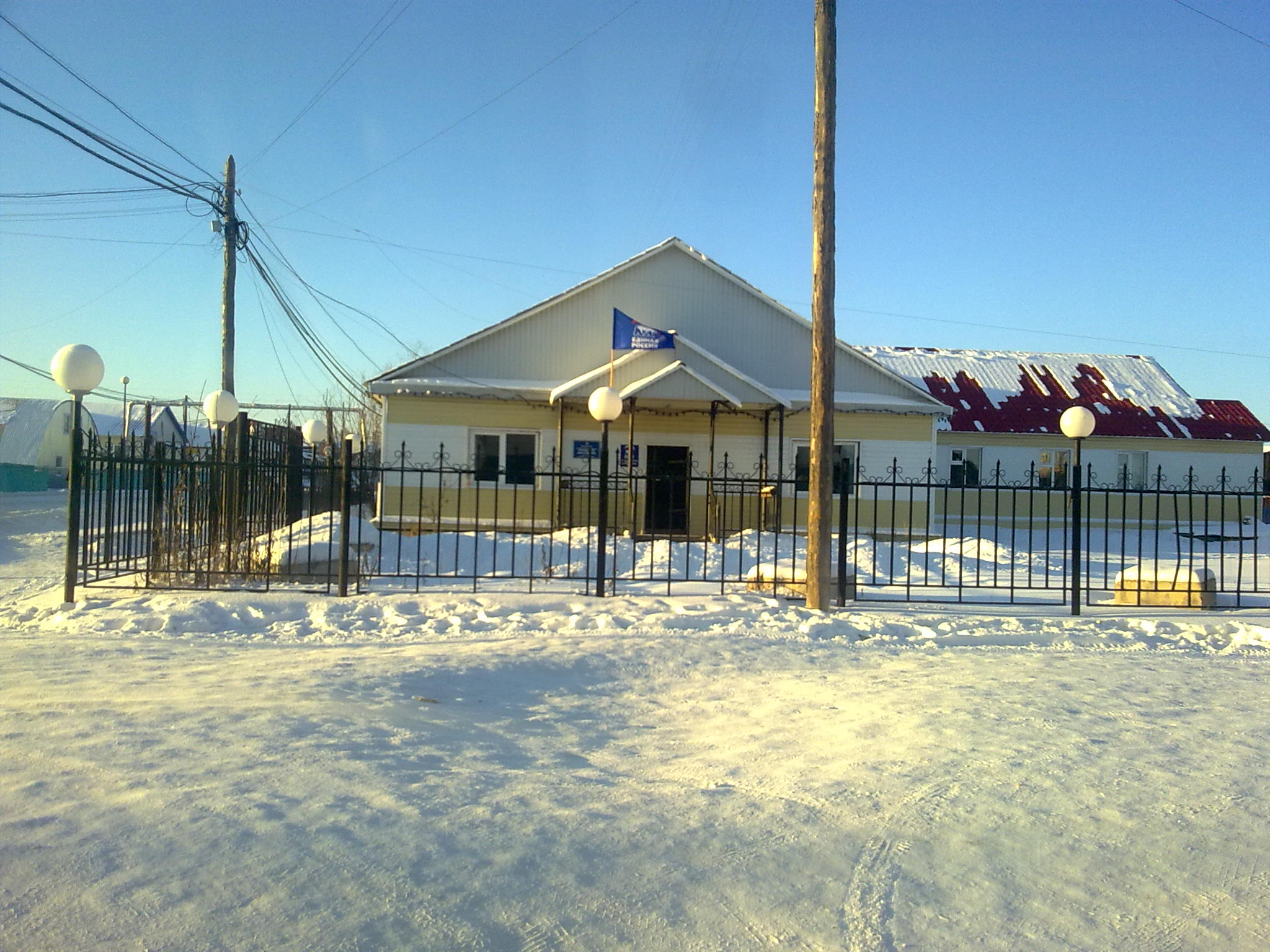
- Village in Verkhnevilyuysky District

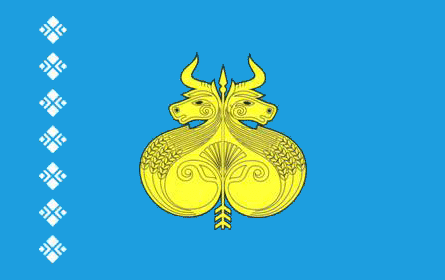
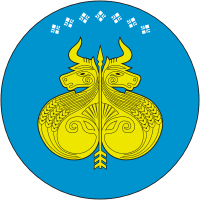
- Flag Coat of arms
- Location of Verkhnevilyuysky District in the Sakha Republic
- Coordinates: 63°27′02″N 120°17′54″E
- Country: Russia
- Federal subject: Sakha Republic
- Established: February 10, 1935
- Administrative center: Verkhnevilyuysk

Area
  - Total: 42,000 km^{2} (16,000 sq mi)

Population (2010 Census)
  - Total: 21,661
  - Density: 0.52/km^{2} (1.3/sq mi)
  - Urban: 0%
  - Rural: 100%

Administrative structure
  - Administrative divisions: 21 rural okrug
  - Inhabited localities: 29 rural localities

Municipal structure
  - Municipally incorporated as: Verkhnevilyuysky Municipal District
  - Municipal divisions: 0 urban settlements, 21 rural settlements
- Time zone: UTC+
- OKTMO ID: 98614000
- Website: https://mr-verhneviljujskij.sakha.gov.ru/

Verkhnevilyuysky District (Russian: Верхневилю́йский улу́с; Yakut: Үөһээ Бүлүү улууһа, Üöhee Bülüü uluuha, [ˈyøheː bylyː uluːha]) is an administrative and municipal district (raion, or ulus), one of the thirty-four in the Sakha Republic, Russia. It is located in the western central part of the republic and borders with Vilyuysky District in the east, Gorny District in the southeast, Olyokminsky District in the south, Suntarsky and Nyurbinsky Districts in the west, and with Olenyoksky District in the northwest. The area of the district is 42,000 square kilometers (16,000 sq mi). Its administrative center is the rural locality (a selo) of Verkhnevilyuysk. Population: 21,661 (2010 census); 21,383 (2002 Census); 20,626 (1989 Soviet census). The population of Verkhnevilyuysk accounts for 29.8% of the district's total population.

== Geography ==
The main rivers in the district include the Vilyuy, the Tyukyan, Tonguo and the Tyung.

=== Climate ===
Average January temperature ranges from −36 °C (−33 °F) in the south to −40 °C (−40 °F) in the north and average July temperature ranges from +12 °C (54 °F) to +14 °C (57 °F). Annual precipitation is 200–250 millimeters (7.9–9.8 in).

== History ==
The district was established on February 10, 1935.

== Demographics ==
As of the 2021 Census, the ethnic composition was as follows:

- Yakuts: 98.9%
- Evenks: 0.5%
- Russians: 0.3%
- other ethnicities: 0.3%

== Economy ==
The economy of the district is mostly based on agriculture.

== Inhabited localities ==
Municipal composition
Rural settlements	Population	Male	Female	Rural localities in jurisdiction*
Balagannakhsky Nasleg (Балаганнахский)	335	169 (50.4%)	166 (49.6%)	**selo of Balagannakh**
Botulunsky Nasleg (Ботулунский)	917	461 (50.3%)	456 (49.7%)	**selo of Botulu**; selo of Kyotyordyokh
Byrakansky Nasleg (Быраканский)	254	128 (50.4%)	126 (49.6%)	**selo of Byrakan**
Verkhnevilyuysky Nasleg (Верхневилюйский)	6,457	3,015 (46.7%)	3,442 (53.3%)	**selo of Verkhnevilyuysk** (administrative centre of the district)
Dalyrsky Nasleg (Далырский)	1,002	505 (50.4%)	497 (49.6%)	**selo of Dalyr**; selo of Bychchagdan; selo of Kulusunnakh
Dyullyukinsky Nasleg (Дюллюкинский)	1,259	611 (48.5%)	648 (51.5%)	**selo of Dyullyukyu**; selo of Byuteydyakh
Edyugeysky Nasleg (Едюгейский)	2,309	1,153 (49.9%)	1,156 (50.1%)	**selo of Andreyevsky**; selo of Kudu
Kentinsky Nasleg (Кентикский)	780	396 (50.8%)	384 (49.2%)	**selo of Kharyyalakh**
Kyrykyysky Nasleg (Кырыкыйский)	442	218 (49.3%)	228 (50.7%)	**selo of Kyrykyy**
Magassky Nasleg (Магасский)	538	269 (50.0%)	269 (50.0%)	**selo of Kharbala**; selo of Chengere
Meyiksky Nasleg (Мейикский)	685	364 (53.1%)	321 (46.9%)	**selo of Sayylyk**; selo of May
Namsky Nasleg (Намский)	1,328	623 (46.9%)	705 (53.1%)	**selo of Khomustakh**
Onkhoysky Nasleg (Онхойский)	620	315 (50.8%)	305 (49.2%)	**selo of Lippe-Atakh**
Orgyotsky Nasleg (Оргётский)	579	277 (47.8%)	302 (52.2%)	**selo of Orgyot**
Orosunsky Nasleg (Оросунский)	730	344 (47.1%)	386 (52.9%)	**selo of Orosu**
Surguluksky Nasleg (Сургулукский)	460	237 (51.5%)	223 (48.5%)	**selo of Bagadya**; selo of Keng-Kyuyol
Tamalkansky Nasleg (Тамалаканский)	643	316 (49.1%)	327 (50.9%)	**selo of Tamalakan**
Tuobuyinsky Nasleg (Туобуйинский)	338	175 (51.8%)	163 (48.2%)	**selo of Tuobuya**
Kharbalakhsky Nasleg (Харбалахский)	548	272 (49.6%)	276 (50.4%)	**selo of Kyul**
Khomustakhsky Nasleg (Хомустахский)	216	112 (51.9%)	104 (48.1%)	**selo of Khomustakh**
Khorinsky Nasleg (Хоринский)	1,221	607 (49.7%)	614 (50.3%)	**selo of Khoro**

Divisional source:
Population source:
*Administrative centers are shown in bold

== See also ==
- Lena Plateau
