= Verkhnevilyuysk =

Verkhnevilyuysk Верхневилюйск
- Selo

Other transcription(s)
  - Sakha: Үөһээ Бүлүү
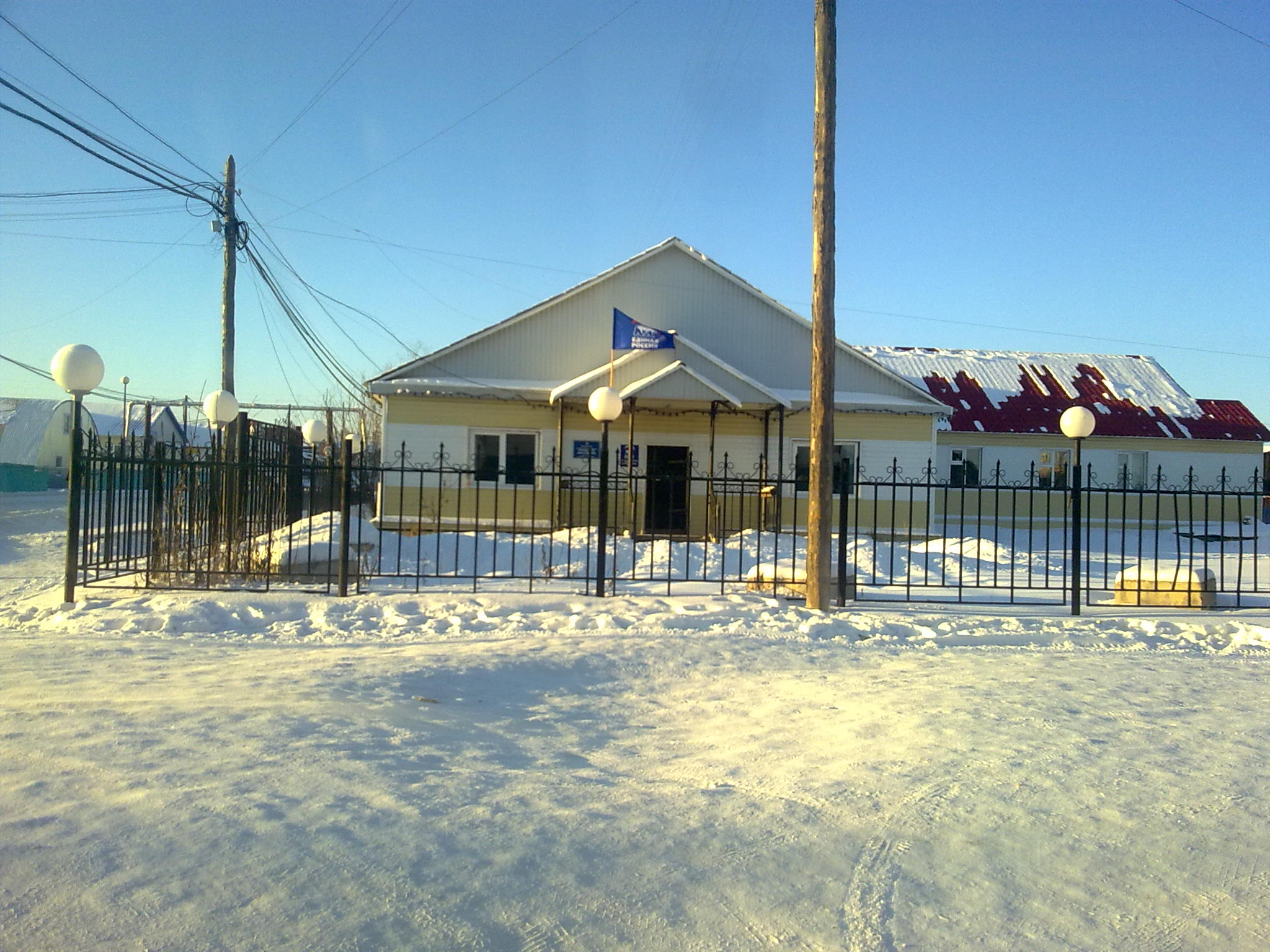
- Interactive map of Verkhnevilyuysk
- Location of Verkhnevilyuysk Verkhnevilyuysk (Sakha Republic)
- Coordinates: 63°27′N 120°18′E
- Country: Russia
- Federal subject: Sakha Republic
- Administrative district: Verkhnevilyuysky District
- Rural okrugSelsoviet: Verkhnevilyuysky Rural Okrug
- Elevation: 124 m (407 ft)

Population (2010 Census)
  - Total: 6,457
  - Estimate (2021): 6,436 (−0.3%)

Administrative status
  - Capital of: Verkhnevilyuysky Rural Okrug

Municipal status
  - Municipal district: Verkhnevilyuysky Municipal District
  - Rural settlement: Verkhnevilyuysky Rural Settlement
  - Capital of: Verkhnevilyuysky Rural Settlement
- Time zone: UTC+
- Postal code: 678230
- Dialing code: +7 841133
- OKTMO ID: 98614412101

Verkhnevilyuysk (Russian: Верхневилюйск; Yakut: Үөһээ Бүлүү, Üöhee Bülüü) is a rural locality (a selo) and the administrative center of Verkhnevilyuysky District of Sakha Republic, Russia. Its population as of the 2010 Census was 6,457, of whom 3,015 were male and 3,442 female, down from 6,555 as recorded during the 2002 Census.

== Geography ==
Verkhnevilyuysk is located in the Central Yakutian Lowland, by the Vilyuy River, near its confluence with the Tyukyan.

== Transportation ==
Verkhnevilyuysk is served by the Verkhnevilyuysk Airport (IATA: VHV).
