= Vaskovo Airport =

Airport in Russia

Arkhangelsk Vaskovo Airport
- IATA: VKV; ICAO: ULAH

Summary
- Airport type: Public
- Location: Arkhangelsk
- Elevation AMSL: 82 ft / 25 m
- Coordinates: 64°26′30″N 40°25′18″E
- Interactive map of Arkhangelsk Vaskovo Airport

Runways
Direction	Length		Surface
Direction	ft	m	Surface
13/31	8,008	2,441	Concrete

Vaskovo Airport (Russian: Аэропорт Васьково) is an airport in Arkhangelsk Oblast, Russia located 13 km southwest of central Arkhangelsk. It is 10 km west of Isakogorka station.

The airport is a general aviation airfield. It is the main base for the airline 2nd Arkhangelsk Aviation Enterprise.

Due to the temporary closure of Talagi Airport, from May 1, 2023, flights to Moscow, St. Petersburg and other cities are transferred to Vaskovo.

== Airlines and destinations ==
Airlines	Destinations
2nd Arkhangelsk United Aviation Division	Dolgoshchelye, Kotlas, Koyda, Koynas, Leshukonskoye, Letnyaya Zolotitsa, Lopshenga, Mezen, Moseyevo, Nes, Nizhnyaya Pesha, Olema, Oma, Pertominsk, Ruchyi, Safonovo, Shoyna, Solovki, Soyana, Tsenogora, Verkhnyaya Zolotitsa, Vozhgora

== See also ==
- List of airports in Russia
