= Agrafena Kryukova =

Russian folklore performer

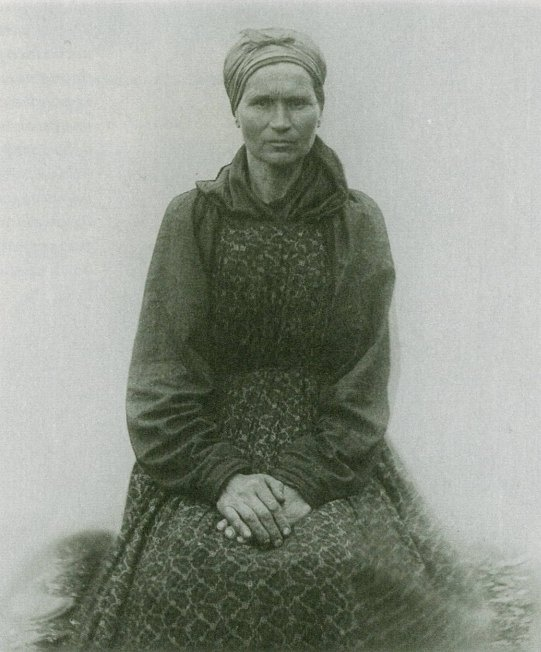
Agrafena Matveyevna Kryukova

Agrafena Matveyevna Kryukova (Russian: Аграфена Матвеевна Крюкова, July 10 [O.S. June 28], 1855, Chavanga, Kolsky Uyezd, Arkhangelsk Governorate, currently Murmansk Oblast, Russia — April 27, 1921, Verkhnyaya Zolotitsa, Arkhangelsky Uyezd, currently Primorsky District, Arkhangelsk Oblast, Russia) was a Russian folklore performer and a storyteller. She was the mother of Marfa Kryukova.

Agrafena Kryukova was born as Agrafena Kozhina in Chavanga, a Pomor village on the Tersky Coast, in the south of the Kola Peninsula. She learned bylinas from her mother and her uncle, and subsequently from her father-in-law, but she remained illiterate. Agrafena Kryukova was married to a fisherman at the age of 18 and moved to the village of Nizhnyaya Zolotitsa, on the other side of the White Sea, currently in Arkhangelsk Oblast.

In 1899, at the peak of interest in Russia to the Northern folklore, Alexey Markov, then a student, visited Verkhnyaya Zolotitsa and recorded a number of bylinas from Agrafena and Marfa Kryukova, which he subsequently published. Markov visited the place once more in 1901. In total, Markov recorded from Agrafena Kryukova 64 bylinas and historic songs.

Agrafena Kryukova died in 1921 in poverty, without achieving prominence. Only later efforts, mostly by Anna Astakhova in 1930s, and the interest to the poetry performed by her daughter Marfa Kryukova, restored her name as one of the most prominent Russian folklore performers.
