= Astakhov =

Astakhov (Russian: Астахов) is a Russian masculine surname, its feminine counterpart is Astakhova. Notable people with the surname include:

- Anna Astakhova (1886–1971), Soviet scholar
- Dmitri Astakhov (born 1986), Russian professional footballer
- Ernest Astakhov (born 1998), Ukrainian professional footballer
- Fedor Astakhov (1892–1966), Soviet Marshal of Aviation Force
- Kristina Astakhova (born 1997), Russian pair skater
- Pavel Astakhov (born 1966), Russian politician, celebrity lawyer and television personality.
- Polina Astakhova (1936–2005), Ukrainian artistic gymnast
- Vitali Astakhov (born 1979), Russian professional footballer

== See also ==
- Astakhov Glacier in Antarctica
