= Marfa Kryukova =

Marfa Semyonovna Kryukova (Russian: Марфа Семёновна Крюкова, born 1876, Verkhnyaya Zolotitsa, Arkhangelsky Uyezd, Arkhangelsk Governorate (currently Primorsky District, Arkhangelsk Oblast), Russia — 7 January 1954, Verkhnyaya Zolotitsa) was a Russian folklore performer and a storyteller.

== Early life ==
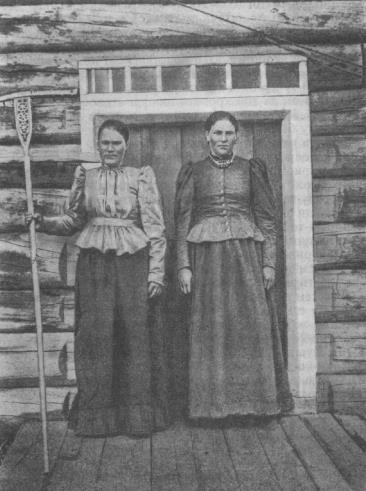
Marfa and her sister Pavla

Marfa Kryukova was born in the Pomor village of Verkhnyaya Zolotitsa on the White Sea north-east of Arkhangelsk. Her mother, Agrafena Kryukova, was known as a storyteller and a folklore performer. Kryukova never married; her lifelong interest in literature was apparently an obstacle to potential suitors. She lived most of her life in poverty.

In 1899, as Russian interest in northern folklore was at its peak, Alexey Markov, then a student, visited Verkhnyaya Zolotitsa and recorded a number of tales and byliny from Agrafena and Marfa Kryukova, which he subsequently published. After the initial publication of her work by Markov, interest in her stories declined.

== Soviet era ==
In 1934, Vladislav Chuzhimov, a folklore collector, visited Verkhnyaya Zolotitsa. By that time, Agrafena Kryukova had already died, so Chuzimov worked with Marfa Kryukova. That same year, Chuzimov published two of the Kryukovas' tales. Anna Astakhova, a folklorist and organizer of many folklore-collecting expeditions to Arkhangelsk Oblast, wrote an essay on the tales. In her essay, she noted the rich and fine details of the stories and the quality of improvisation that they employed. In 1937, Astakhova herself visited Nizhnaya Zolotitsa and collected a number of byliny from Kryukova. In the same year, folklore collectors Borodina and Lipets started to work with Kryukova, and in 1939 they published a two-volume edition of byliny narrated by Kryukova. In total, Kryukova recorded about 150 byliny, which include most traditional folktales.

The Soviet authorities wanted to establish a new genre of folklore to conform to the ideological paradigms of the time. As part of this effort, Kryukova was invited in 1937 to perform in Arkhangelsk and Moscow; she was also assigned a literary agent, Viktorin Popov. This trip was Kryukova's first occasion to leave her home village. Popov persuaded Kryukova to write a poem about Vladimir Lenin and provided the necessary biographical details. The works she developed were given a new name, novina, to distinguish them from the traditional bylina. This new form, rather than being based on folklore, was to be written on a topic related to the modern history of the Soviet Union.

Until her death in 1954, Kryukova recorded many noviny, and consequently earned high regard from Soviet officials and in Soviet culture. She was invited to travel across the country, and her books were widely publicized. In recognition of her contributions, Arkhangelsk authorities built a house for her in her native village. Kryukova was accepted into the Union of Soviet Writers. She was awarded the Order of Lenin and the Order of the Red Banner of Labour.
