= Dvina Bay =

Bay in Arkhangelsk Oblast, Russia

Coordinates: 65°00′N 39°13′E

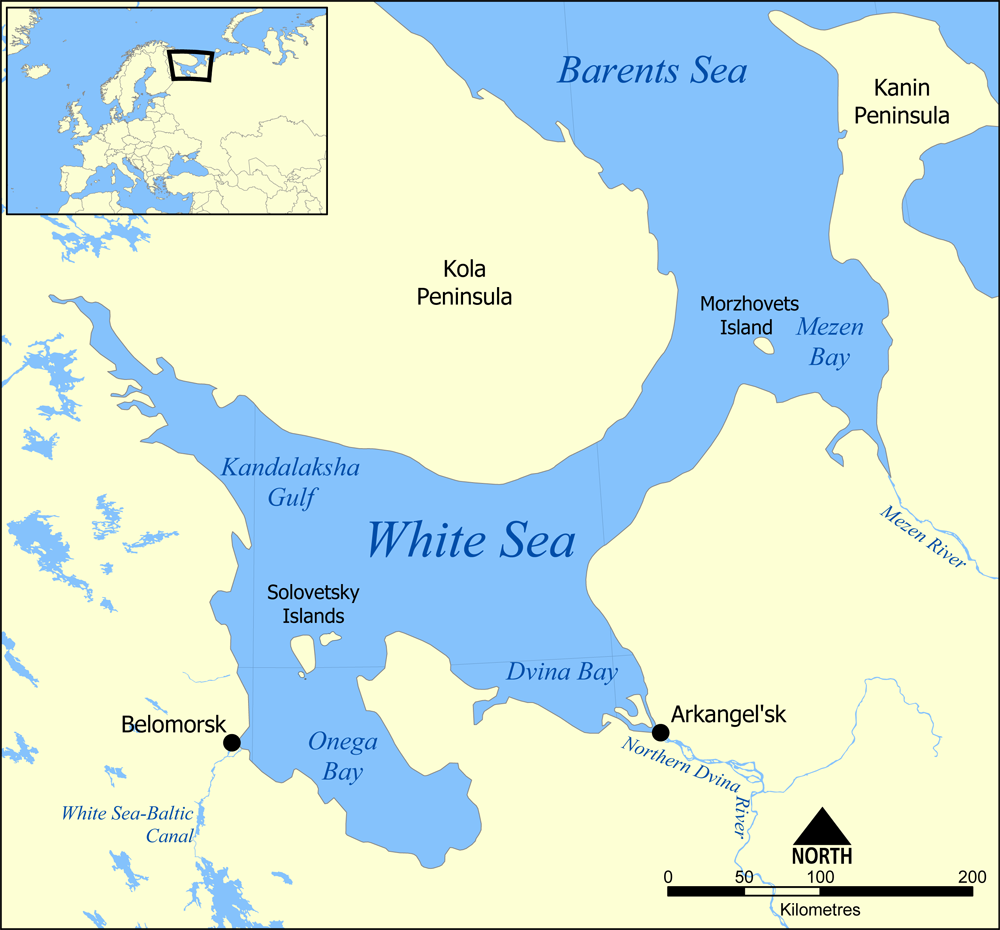
The Dvina Bay on the map of the White Sea.

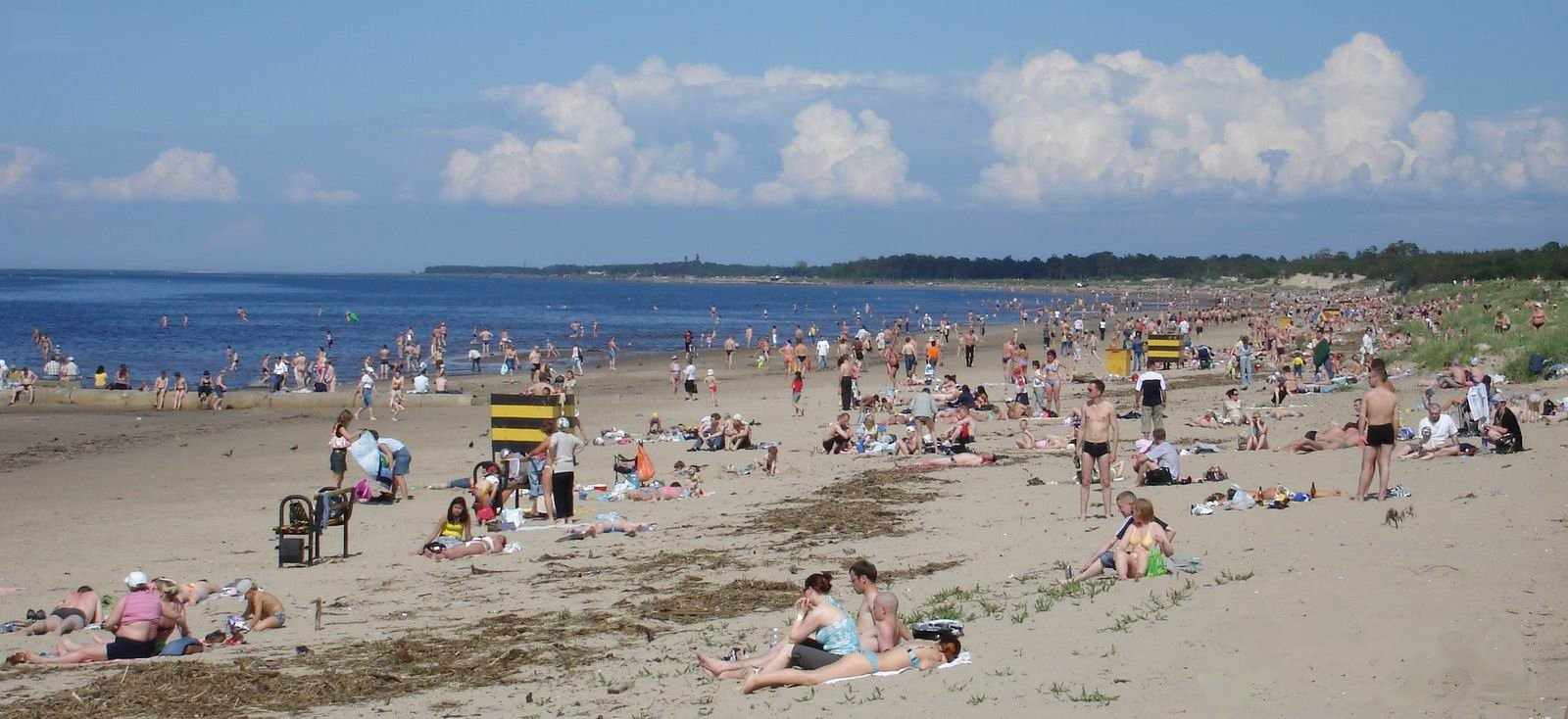
Yagry Island Beach near Severodvinsk

The Dvina Bay (Russian: Двинская Губа) is located in Arkhangelsk Oblast in Northwestern Russia. It is one of four large bays and gulfs of the White Sea, the others being the Mezen Bay, the Onega Bay, and the Kandalaksha Gulf. The two main river emptying into the Dvina Bay is the Northern Dvina River, while the two cities on the bay are Arkhangelsk and Severodvinsk. The Dvina Bay is 93 kilometres (58 mi) long and 130 kilometres (81 mi) wide. Administratively, the coast and the islands belong to Primorsky District of Arkhangelsk Oblast.

The Northern Dvina forms a delta entering the Dvina Bay, with many islands separating different streams. There are many small islands in the Dvina Bay as well, the biggest being Mudyug Island.

A national park, Onezhskoye Pomorye National Park, was open on the Onega Peninsula on 26 February 2013.

The Dvina Bay is limited by the Onega Peninsula from the west. At the eastern side, the shore steeply rises to a plateau (White Sea - Kuloy Plateau) which drains east into the Soyana, a major tributary of the Kuloy. The Onega Peninsula shore is often referred to as Letny Bereg (Summer Coast), and the eastern shore of the bay is Zimny Bereg (Winter Coast). The names reflect the fact that the Pomors of the Dvina Bay were fishing at Summer Coast and Winter Coast in the summer and in the winter, respectively.

The Dvina Bay coast was populated by Russians (Novgorodians, of whom the Pomors are the descendants) and Karelians, both not later than in the 13th century. Until the 18th century, when Saint Petersburg was founded, Arkhangelsk was the only sea harbour of Russia, and the Northern Dvina and the Dvina Bay were main connection of Russia with the outside world. Most of the villages at the Dvina Bay coast such as Pertominsk, Lopshenga, or Yarenga, are old Pomor villages still depending on fishery. Except for vicinity of the river delta of the Northern Dvina, both Winter and Summer coasts are remote, with sea and air being the only connections to the villages. There is regular sea navigation in the summer, serving all of the villages.
