= Primorsky District, Arkhangelsk Oblast =

Primorsky District Приморский район (Russian)
- District
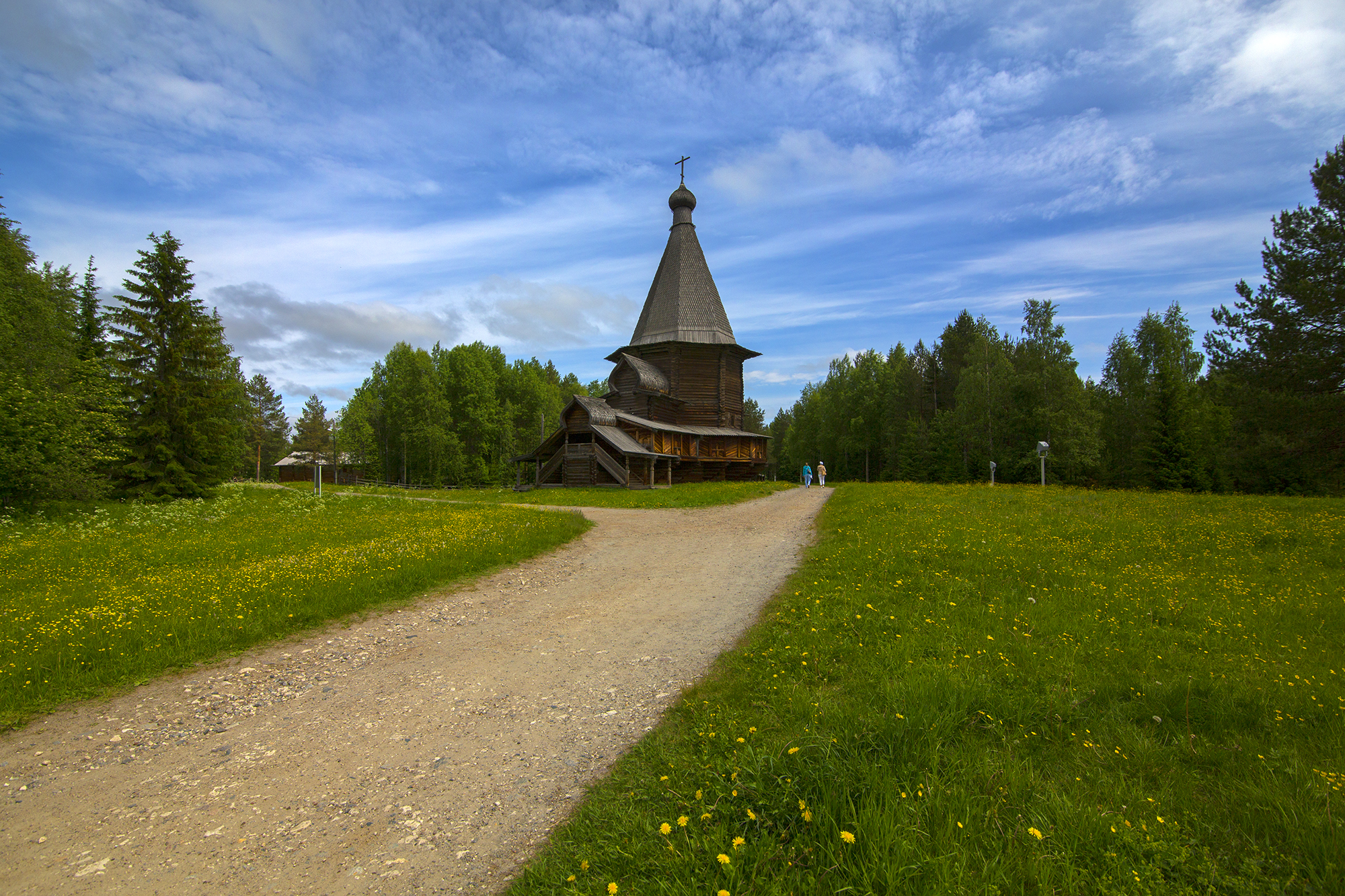
- St. George Church from Vershiny (Malye Korely), Primorsky District

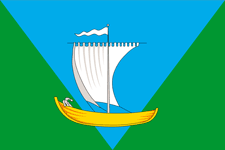
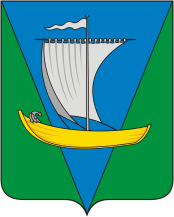
- Flag Coat of arms
- Location of Primorsky Municipal District in Arkhangelsk Oblast
- Coordinates: 64°58′N 37°41′E
- Country: Russia
- Federal subject: Arkhangelsk Oblast
- Established: July 15, 1929
- Administrative center: Arkhangelsk

Area
  - Total: 46,100 km^{2} (17,800 sq mi)

Population (2010 Census)
  - Total: 25,466
  - Density: 0.552/km^{2} (1.43/sq mi)
  - Urban: 0%
  - Rural: 100%

Administrative structure
  - Administrative divisions: 17 selsoviet
  - Inhabited localities: 206 rural localities

Municipal structure
  - Municipally incorporated as: Primorsky Municipal District
  - Municipal divisions: 0 urban settlements, 19 rural settlements
- Time zone: UTC+3 (MSK)
- OKTMO ID: 11652000
- Website: http://www.primadm.ru/

Primorsky District (Russian: Примо́рский райо́н) is an administrative district (raion), one of the twenty-one in Arkhangelsk Oblast, Russia. As a municipal division, it is incorporated as Primorsky Municipal District, and also includes Solovetsky Islands in the White Sea and Franz Josef Land and Victoria Island in the Arctic Ocean (even though within the administrative framework those are incorporated as Solovetsky District and the island territories, respectively). It is located in the north of the oblast and borders with Mezensky District in the northeast, Pinezhsky District in the east, Kholmogorsky District in the southeast, Plesetsky District in the south, and with Onezhsky District in the south. From the north, the district is washed by the White Sea. The area of the district is 46,100 square kilometers (17,800 sq mi). Its administrative center is the city of Arkhangelsk (which is not administratively a part of the district). Population: 25,466 (2010 census); 29,365 (2002 census); 31,813 (1989 Soviet census).

== Geography ==
The district occupies the lower course of the Northern Dvina River and the White Sea coast around the Dvina Bay. The waters of the district drain into the Northern Dvina and the short rivers of the Dvina Bay basin, such as the Shirshema and the Lodma. The eastern part of the district is a plateau which drains into the Soyana, a major tributary of the Kuloy. The source of the Soyana is located within the district limits. Minor areas in the southeast of the district belong to the basins of other tributaries of the Kuloy, such as the Kyolda and the Polta. There are many lakes throughout the district.

The western part of the district is located on the Onega Peninsula, which is shared with Onezhsky District. A national park, Onezhskoye Pomorye National Park, was opened on the peninsula on 26 February 2013.

== History ==
The area was originally populated by speakers of Uralic languages and then colonized by the Novgorod Republic. Novgorod merchants reached the White Sea in the 13th century; the Pomors, who inhabit the White Sea coast now, are the descendants of the original Novgorod population. After the fall of Novgorod, the area became a part of the Grand Duchy of Moscow. Until the 1700s, Arkhangelsk was the main trading harbor for the sea trade of Russia and Western Europe, and the Northern Dvina was the main trading route connecting central Russia with Arkhangelsk. The traditional occupation of the population of the Dvina Bay was fishery and trade. Peter the Great drastically changed the situation, by founding St. Petersburg in 1703, thus opening the way for the Baltic Sea trade.

In the course of the administrative reform carried out in 1708 by Peter the Great, the area was included into Archangelgorod Governorate. In 1780, the governorate was abolished and transformed into Vologda Viceroyalty, and the area was included into Arkhangelsky Uyezd. In 1796, the area was transferred to Arkhangelsk Governorate.

In 1929, several governorates were merged into Northern Krai. On July 15, 1929, the uyezds were abolished, and Primorsky District was established. It became a part of Arkhangelsk Okrug of Northern Krai. In the following years, the first-level administrative division of Russia kept changing. In 1930, the okrug was abolished, and the district was subordinated to the central administration of Northern Krai. In 1936, the krai was transformed into Northern Oblast. In 1937, Northern Oblast itself was split into Arkhangelsk Oblast and Vologda Oblast. Primorsky District remained in Arkhangelsk Oblast ever since. The location of the administrative center of the district was moved several times until Arkhangelsk finally became the center.

On December 17, 1940, Belomorsky District was established on the Onega Peninsula, in the areas which previously were parts of Primorsky and Onezhsky Districts. The administrative center of the district became the settlement of Pertominsk. On September 30, 1958, Belomorsky District was abolished, and the area of the district was shared between Primorsky and Onezhsky Districts.

Arkhangelsky District existed from December 24, 1952 to October 7, 1955. In 1955, it was merged into Primorsky District.

== Administrative and municipal status ==
=== Administrative divisions ===
Within the framework of administrative divisions, Primorsky District is one of the twenty-one in the oblast. The city of Arkhangelsk serves as its administrative center, despite being incorporated separately as a city of oblast significance—an administrative unit with the status equal to that of the districts. The district is divided into seventeen selsoviets. One locality which previously had work settlement status (Uyemsky), was downgraded to rural status in 2006. The following selsoviets have been established (the administrative centers are given in parentheses):

- Katuninsky (Katunino)
- Koskogorsky (Bobrovo)
- Lastolsky (Lastola)
- Letne-Zolotitsky (Letnyaya Zolotitsa)
- Lisestrovsky (Okulovo)
- Lopshengsky (Lopshenga)
- Lyavlensky (Khorkovo)
- Patrakeyevsky (Patrakeyevka)
- Pertominsky (Pertominsk)
- Povrakulsky (Povrakulskaya)
- Primorsky (Rikasikha)
- Pustoshinsky (Odinochka)
- Talazhsky (Talagi)
- Uyemsky (Uyemsky)
- Voznesensky (Voznesenye)
- Zaostrovsky (Bolshoye Anisimovo)
- Zimne-Zolotitsky (Verkhnyaya Zolotitsa)

=== Municipal divisions ===
As a municipal division, the district is incorporated as Primorsky Municipal District. The city of oblast significance of Arkhangelsk is incorporated separately from the district as Arkhangelsk Urban Okrug. The territories of both Primorsky and Solovetsky Districts are included into Primorsky Municipal District. Within the framework of municipal divisions, Solovetsky District is incorporated as Solovetskoye Rural Settlement within Primorsky Municipal District. Primorsky Municipal District is divided into nineteen rural settlements (the administrative centers are given in parentheses):

- Katuninskoye Rural Settlement (Katunino)
- Koskogorskoye Rural Settlement (Bobrovo)
- Lastolskoye Rural Settlement (Lastola)
- Letne-Zolotitskoye Rural Settlement (Letnyaya Zolotitsa)
- Lisestrovskoye Rural Settlement (Okulovo)
- Lopshengskoye Rural Settlement (Lopshenga)
- Lyavlenskoye Rural Settlement (Khorkovo)
- Patrakeyevskoye Rural Settlement (Patrakeyevka)
- Pertominskoye Rural Settlement (Pertominsk)
- Povrakulskoye Rural Settlement (Povrakulskaya)
- Primorskoye Rural Settlement (Rikasikha)
- Pustoshinskoye Rural Settlement (Odinochka)
- Solovetskoye Rural Settlement (Solovetsky)
- Talazhskoye Rural Settlement (Talagi)
- Uyemskoye Rural Settlement (Uyemsky)
- Vaskovskoye Rural Settlement (Vaskovo)
- Voznesenskoye Rural Settlement (Voznesenye)
- Zaostrovskoye Rural Settlement (Bolshoye Anisimovo)
- Zimne-Zolotitskoye Rural Settlement (Verkhnyaya Zolotitsa)

== Economy ==
The economy of the district is based on timber industry and fishing.

Railroads connect the cities of Arkhangelsk and Severodvinsk with Obozyorskaya railway station, and further with Vologda and Belomorsk. A railway line connecting Arkhangelsk and Karpogory also passes through the district. This line is expected to become a part of the Belkomur project—a railway line connecting Arkhangelsk via the Komi Republic with Perm Krai and the Ural Mountains. The stretch between Arkhangelsk and Karpogory was built in the 1970s. Kholmogorskaya railway station on the railroad between Moscow and Arkhangelsk is located in Plesetsky District.

There are many roads around Arkhangelsk. The Northern Dvina is navigable, and there is regular passenger navigation upstream from Arkhangelsk. There is also regular, albeit infrequent, sea passenger navigation connecting Arkhangelsk with the settlements on the Onega Peninsula (including Pertominsk, Lopshenga, and Letnyaya Zolotitsa) which are not connected to the all-season road network. Arkhangelsk also has air connections with these settlements, as well as with Solovetsky Islands.

== Culture and recreation ==
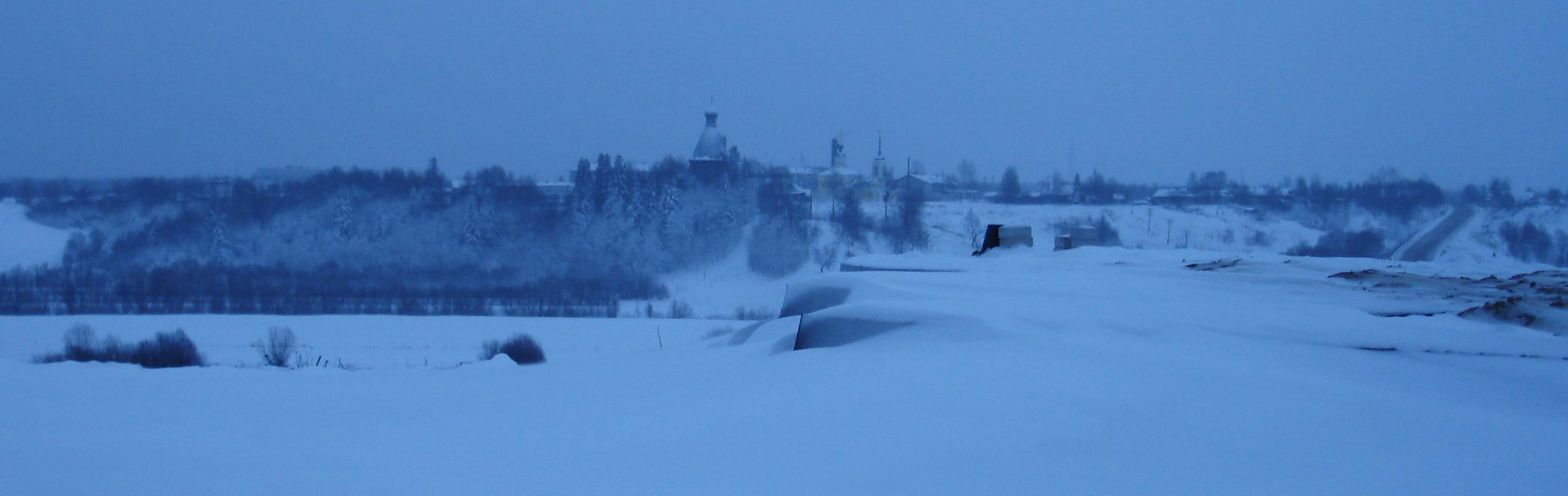
Lyavlenskoye Rural Settlement. The wooden Assumption Church is seen on the left.

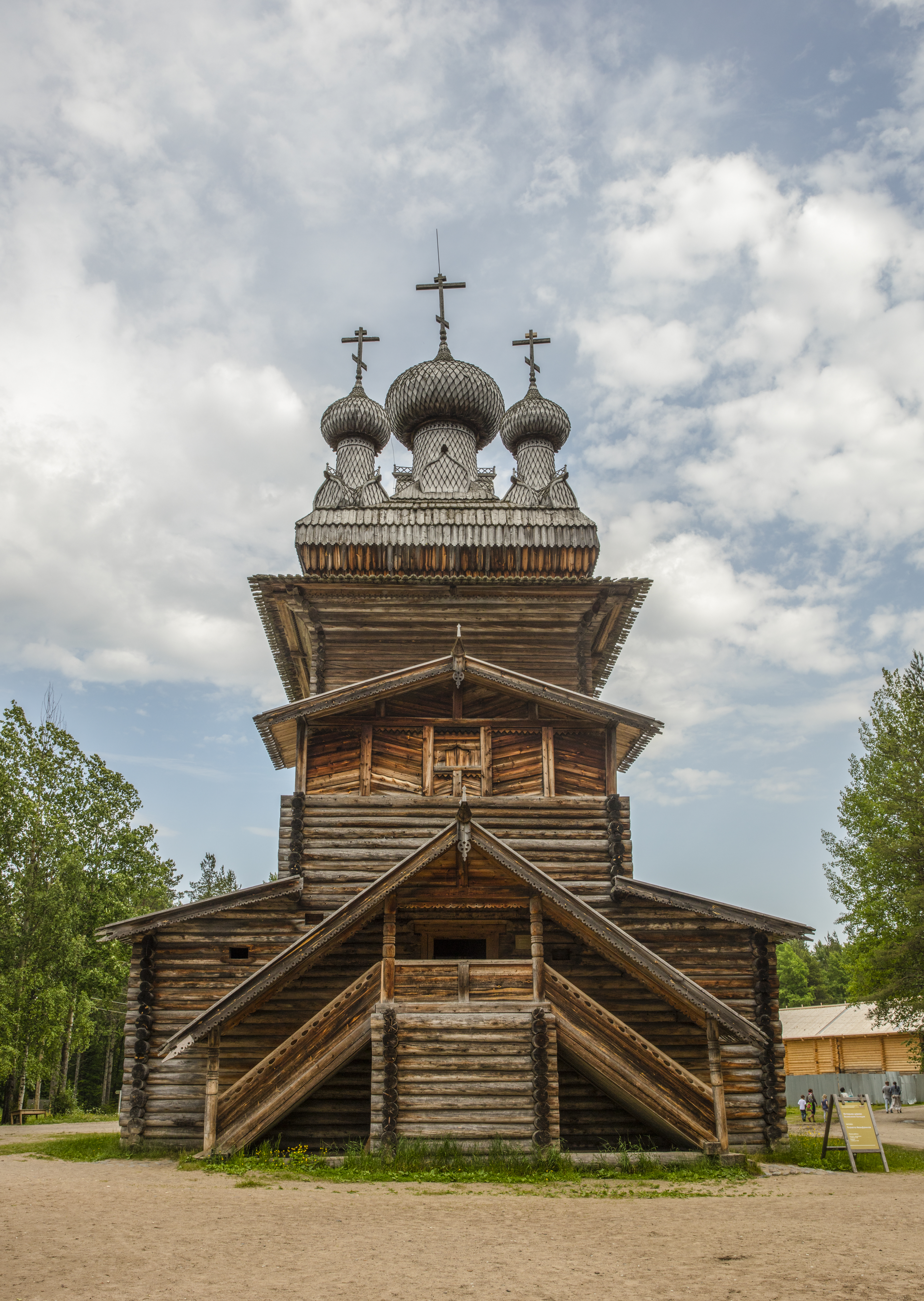
The Ascension Church from the village of Kushereka (1854) in the Malye Korely Open Air Museum

There are two state museums in the district. The Malye Korely Open Air Museum is located approximately 30 kilometers (19 mi) south of Arkhangelsk. It was created to protect the oeuvres of the Russian wooden architecture, and contains many buildings from various parts of Arkhangelsk Oblast. There is also the Primorye Handicraft Museum, located in the settlement of Uyemsky.

The district contains 151 objects classified as cultural and historical heritage by the Russian Federal law and additionally 49 objects classified as cultural and historical heritage of local importance. Most of these belong to the Malye Korely Museum. Other monuments protected at the federal level include:

- the Izhma Pogost consisting of the Transfiguration Church (1679), the Resurrection Church (1881–1887), and the house of a priest
- the Konetsdvorye Pogost consisting of the St. Nicholas Church (1769) and the bell-tower (1905)
- the Assumption Church in Lyavlenskoye Rural Settlement (1581–1584)
- the Mudyuzhsky Pogost in the village of Patrakeyevka, consisting of the St. Nicolas wooden church (1744) and the Assumption Church (1870–1878)
- the buildings of the former prison camp on Mudyug Island, organized by British and French forces during the Russian Civil War

Russian North and Primorsky District in particular is an area notable for its folklore. Until the mid-20th century, fairy tales and bylinas were still performed on the daily basis by performers who became professionals. Agrafena Kryukova and her daughter Marfa Kryukova from the village of Verkhnyaya Zolotitsa were the best known fairy tale performers in the area. Starting from the 1890s, folkloric expeditions were organized to the White Sea area, and later to other areas of Arkhangelsk Governorate, in order to write down the tales and the bylinas, especially in the Pomor dialects. In the 1920s, mostly due to the efforts of Anna Astakhova, these expeditions became systematic. The results have been published. By the 1960s, the performing art was basically extinct. These folkloric motives and fairy tales inspired the literary works of Stepan Pisakhov, a native of Arkhangelsk. Many fairy tales of Pisakhov are set against the village of Uyma (currently Uyemsky).
