= Soyana (river) =

Soyana Russian: Сояна

Location
- Country: Russia

Physical characteristics
- Mouth: Kuloy
  - coordinates: 65°53′22″N 43°28′15″E
  - elevation: 1 m (3 ft)
- Length: 140 km (87 mi)
- Basin size: 5,860 km^{2} (2,260 sq mi)
- Discharge
  - average: 50 m^{3}/s (1,800 cu ft/s)

Basin features
- Progression: Kuloy→ White Sea

The Kuloy River basin. The Soyana is shown

The Soyana (Russian: Сояна) is a river in Primorsky and Mezensky Districts of Arkhangelsk Oblast in Russia. It is a left tributary of the Kuloy. It is 140 kilometres (87 mi) long, and the area of its basin 5,860 square kilometres (2,260 sq mi). The main tributaries of the Soyana are the Nyrzanga (right) and the Telsa (left).

The Soyana collects the drain of the plateau on the eastern side of the Dvina Bay of the White Sea (known as White Sea - Kuloy Plateau). The river originates at the confluence of the Kepina and the Kotuga, and the Kotuga is the lower course of the Pochuga and the Yelovitsa, connected with them via a system of lakes. From the confluence, the river flows north-east. The only settlement on the river banks is the village of Soyana, in the Mezensky District on the right-hand bank 17 kilometres (11 mi) upstream from the mouth.

The Soyana is navigable between the village of Soyana and the Kuloy River.
