= Vladimir Volsky =

Russian revolutionary

- Владимир Вольский
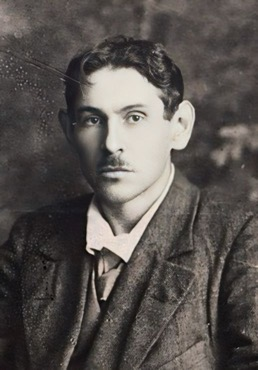
- Volsky in 1918

Chairman of the Committee of Members of the Constituent Assembly
- In office June – September 1918
- Preceded by: Position established (Alexander Kerensky as Minister-Chairman of the Provisional Government)
- Succeeded by: Position abolished (Nikolai Avksentiev as Chairman of the Provisional All-Russian Government)

Personal details
- Born: 6 November 1877 Tambov, Russian Empire
- Died: 4 October 1937 (aged 59) Kazakh SSR, Soviet Union
- Party: RSDLP (1899–1903); PSR (1903–1921)
- Spouse: Maria Pavlovna Krasnikova
- Parents: Kazimir Kazimirovich Volsky (father); Elizaveta Leopoldovna (mother)

Vladimir Kazimirovich Volsky (Russian: Владимир Казимирович Вольский; 23 June 1877 – 4 October 1937) was a Russian revolutionary with a Narodnik orientation.

== Biography ==
Vladimir Volsky was born in Tambov, fathered by Kazimir Kazimirovich Volsky (3 September 1843 - 1913) an attorney in the Tambov District Court.

He graduated from school in 1894, and went on to study at the Physics and Mathematics Department of Moscow University, but in 1902 he was expelled to Vyatka and emigrated. Volsky joined the Socialist Revolutionary Party (PSR) in 1903.

Vladimir secretly returned to Russia and joined the SR Central Committee in the Caucasus. He embraced the terrorist methods of the PSR, personally involving himself in a plot to assassinate the governor of Baku in 1904. In 1905, he briefly became the lover of Maria Spiridonova, the future leader of Left Socialist-Revolutionaries. Soon after, he was arrested in Tambov and once again sent to the Vyatka province. In 1908, he was sentenced to 3 years in prison and sent to the Vologda province. In 1911, he moved to Moscow, where he engaged in the creation of Social Revolutionary militant groups. During the First World War he was expelled to Kashin and Kostroma.

At the time of the February Revolution of 1917, Volsky was in Tver, where he soon became a leading member of the local party. Together with his brother, he was elected to the Constituent Assembly as the representative of Tver Oblast. Following the Bolshevik seizure of power in 1917, he became active in the Socialist Revolutionary resistance to the Bolsheviks and became chairman of the Committee of Members of the Constituent Assembly who established themselves in Samara. The Bolsheviks declared him a counter-revolutionary, subject to immediate arrest. He went underground and the SR Central Committee sent him to the Volga region and to the Urals to attend the State Meeting in Ufa and organize an uprising against the Bolsheviks.

After Alexander Kolchak's coup on 18 November 1918, Volsky issued an appeal "To all the peoples of Russia," in which he announced the election of a Committee, responsible for the Congress of the All-Russian Constituent Assembly. Volsky instructed this committee to eliminate the Kolchak conspiracy. He was arrested in Yekaterinburg by some of Kolchak's White Army officers, but fled with the help of the Czechoslovaks, and joined the anti-Kolchak underground movement.

After the Red Army captured Ufa in June 1919, the remaining members of the SR Central Committee of the Volga —the so-called Ufa delegation – began negotiations with the Ufa revolutionary committee about joint action against Kolchak. The SR Central Committee reacted negatively to the idea of negotiations and labelled the actions of the Ufa delegation as a betrayal of the party. Nevertheless, the Ufa delegation did not abandon its position and formed the "People's group". Members of the People's group insisted on a complete rejection of the armed struggle against the Bolsheviks.

At the end of October, the SR Central Committee decided to dissolve the People's group, and its leaders received a final warning with the threat of expulsion from the party. However, the group refused to comply with the decision on its dissolution and stated that it was leaving the party, leaving the right to appeal to the nearest party congress, taking the name – the Minority Party of Socialist-Revolutionaries (MPSR). The speeches by the MPSR at the Seventh and Eighth All-Russian Congresses of Soviets spoke about the need to bring democracy to the Soviet government, review the functions of the Cheka, review the provisions of the Constitution of the RSFSR (introduce provisions on universal suffrage, the right to free speech for workers, the right to freedom of the press, freedom of assembly, guarantees against extrajudicial reprisals against workers and the provision of freedom of action to those social movements and political parties that do not fight against the Soviet regime).

During the Kronstadt rebellion in March 1921, the MPSR created the "Political Center", allegedly, to serve the function of the future government – this included two members of the MPSR Central Bureau, including Volsky. Other members of the Central Bank proposed to expel Volsky from the MPSR and conduct a party investigation in the case of the Political Center. In March 1922, the GPU exposed the Political Center and other material from the state's investigation of the party, seized during a year of searches and arrests. Volsky was arrested by the Cheka and spent three years in the Pertominsk Camp of Special Designation. He was later transferred to the Solovki prison camp, and eventually sent into internal exile in Semipalatinsk.

He was again arrested in February 1937, during the Great Purge. On 22 September 1937 Stalin, Molotov and Zhdanov signed the "List of Persons Subject to the Court of the Military Collegium of the Supreme Court of the USSR" (Kazakh SSR). Volsky was shot for belonging to an "anti-Soviet terrorist organization." Volski'i was rehabilitated in 1991.
