= Nemnyuga =

Nemnyuga Russian: Немнюга

Location
- Country: Russia

Physical characteristics
- Mouth: Kuloy
  - coordinates: 65°28′05″N 43°41′40″E
  - elevation: 4 m (13 ft)
- Length: 201 km (125 mi)
- Basin size: 3,630 km^{2} (1,400 sq mi)
- Discharge
  - average: 26 cubic metres per second (920 cu ft/s)

Basin features
- Progression: Kuloy→ White Sea

The Kuloy basin. The Nemnyuga is shown

The Nemnyuga (Russian: Немнюга) is a river in Leshukonsky, Pinezhsky, and Mezensky Districts of Arkhangelsk Oblast in Russia. It is a right tributary of the Kuloy River. It is 201 kilometres (125 mi) long, and the area of its basin 3,630 square kilometres (1,400 sq mi). The principal tributaries are the Korda (left), the Parsova (left), and the Shala (right).

The river basin of the Nemnyuga comprises a vast area between the Kuloy and the Mezen rivers which belongs to three districts of Arkhangelsk Oblast, Leshukonsky, Pinezhsky, and Mezensky Districts.

The source of the Nemnyuga is located in Leshukonsky District, very close to the border with Pinezhsky District. The river flows west, crosses into Pinezhsky District, and turns north. At the confluence with its right tributary, the Berezov, the Nemnyuga turns north-west and starts meandering.

The only settlements on the river are Sovpolye and Chizhgora, both at the confluence of the Sova, a right tributary of the Nemnyuga. Downstream from Chizhgora, there is a ferry crossing on the road connecting Arkhangelsk and Mezen.

The lower course of the Nemnyuga, the 37 kilometres (23 mi) stretch downstream from the selo of Sovpolye, is navigable, although there is no passenger navigation.
