= Port of Arkhangelsk =

Port in Russia

Coordinates: 64°32′N 40°30′E

The Port of Arkhangelsk
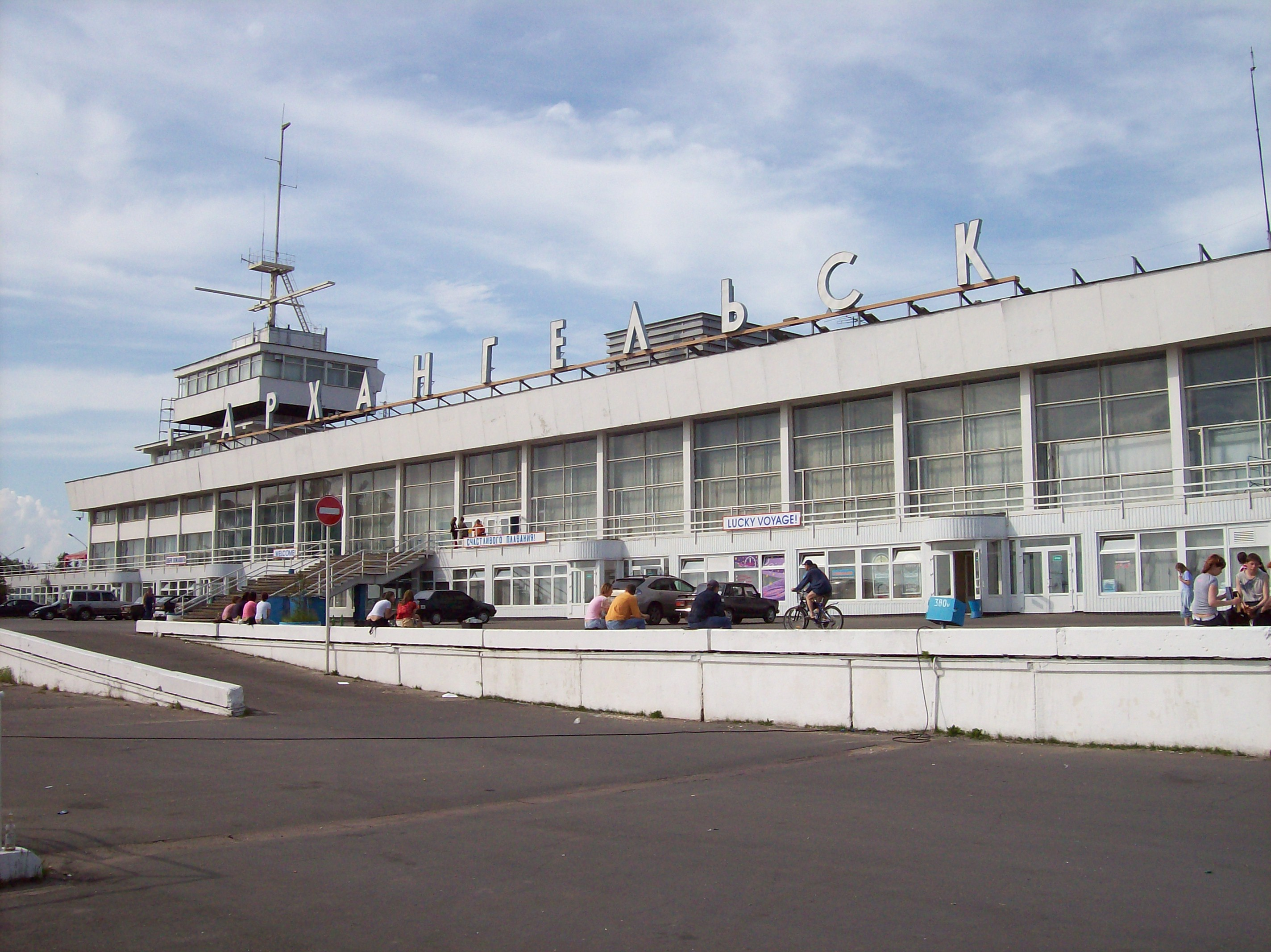
- Interactive map of The Port of Arkhangelsk

Location
- Country: Russia
- Location: Arkhangelsk
- UN/LOCODE: RUARH

Details
- Opened: 1584
- Operated by: Joint Stock Company Arkhangelsk Commercial Sea Port
- Land area: 72.15 ha (178.3 acres)

Statistics
- Annual cargo tonnage: ▲4.4 million tonnes (2013)
- Website; The Port of Arkhangelsk

Port of Arkhangelsk (Russian: Архангельский морской торговый порт) is a major seaport at Arkhangelsk, located at the mouth of the Northern Dvina River, 50 kilometres (31 mi) from the Dvina Bay of the White Sea. The important point links with coastal areas of the Russian North. For much of Russia's history this was Russia's main centre of international maritime trade, conducted by the so-called Pomors ("seaside settlers") from Kholmogory.

During the Soviet period it was a major naval and submarine base of the Soviet Navy. It is still a major naval base of the Northern Fleet of the Russian Navy.

== Overview ==
Arkhangelsk sea port sends and receives lumber, pulp, coal, machinery, metals, industrial and consumer goods. Arkhangelsk seaport - the main base of the Northern Company, performing the maritime transport of the White, Barents and Kara seas, the Northern Sea Route and overseas lines. Originate from Arkhangelsk regular passenger line to Murmansk, Dikson, Onega, Mezen, Kandalaksha and Novaya Zemlya.

As part of the port has three cargo areas, a container terminal, shipping company "Portoflot" sea-river station. The total length of wharfage is 3.3 km (2.1 mi). Berths allow the port to handle vessels with a draft of 9.2 m (30 ft) and a length of 175–200 metres (574–656 ft). The port has a total usable area for warehousing of 292,000 m^{2} (3,140,000 sq ft), including 40,000 m^{2} (430,000 sq ft) of closed storage and 250,000 m^{2} (2,700,000 sq ft) of open tarmac. The Customs warehouses measure 2,000 m^{2} (22,000 sq ft). The Arkhangelsk port is the only container terminal in northern Russia, of which there is 98,000 m^{2} (1,050,000 sq ft) of the open space area that can contain 5,762 TEU intermodal containers, including up to 200 reefer containers and 2,200 containers with dangerous goods. Bandwidth container terminal 75,000 TEUs per year.

== Gallery ==
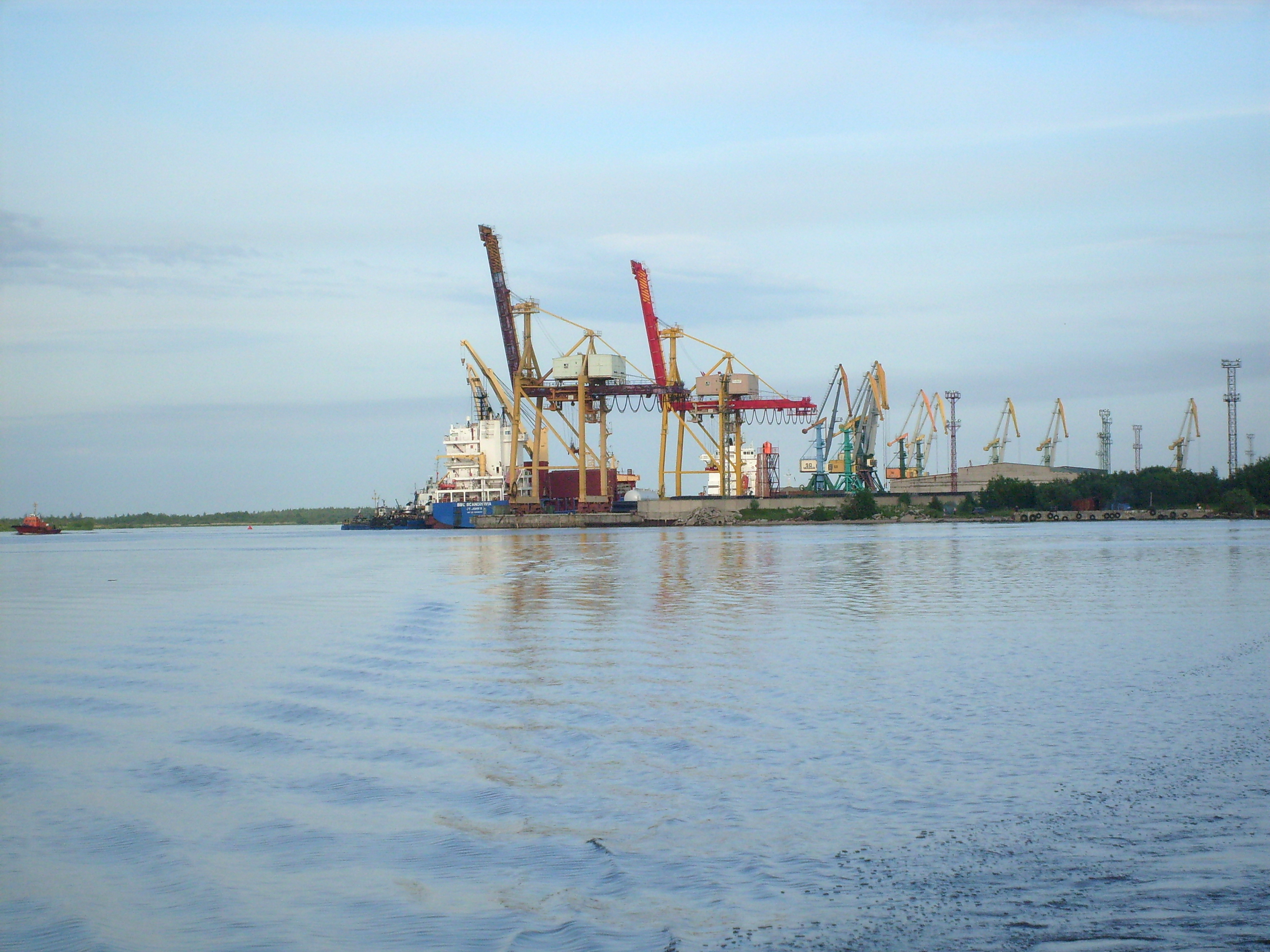
Berth No. 118

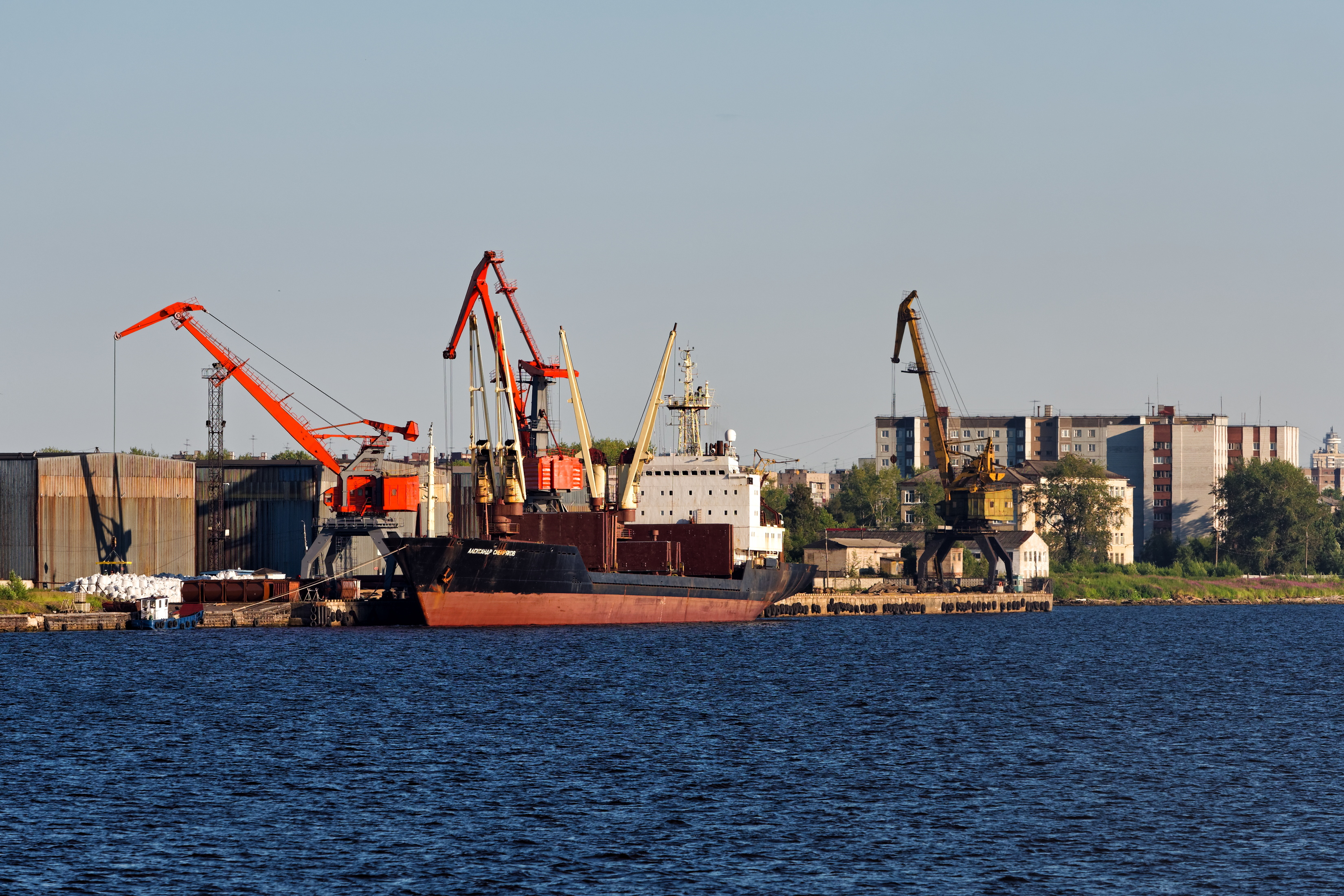
Berths No. 46-48

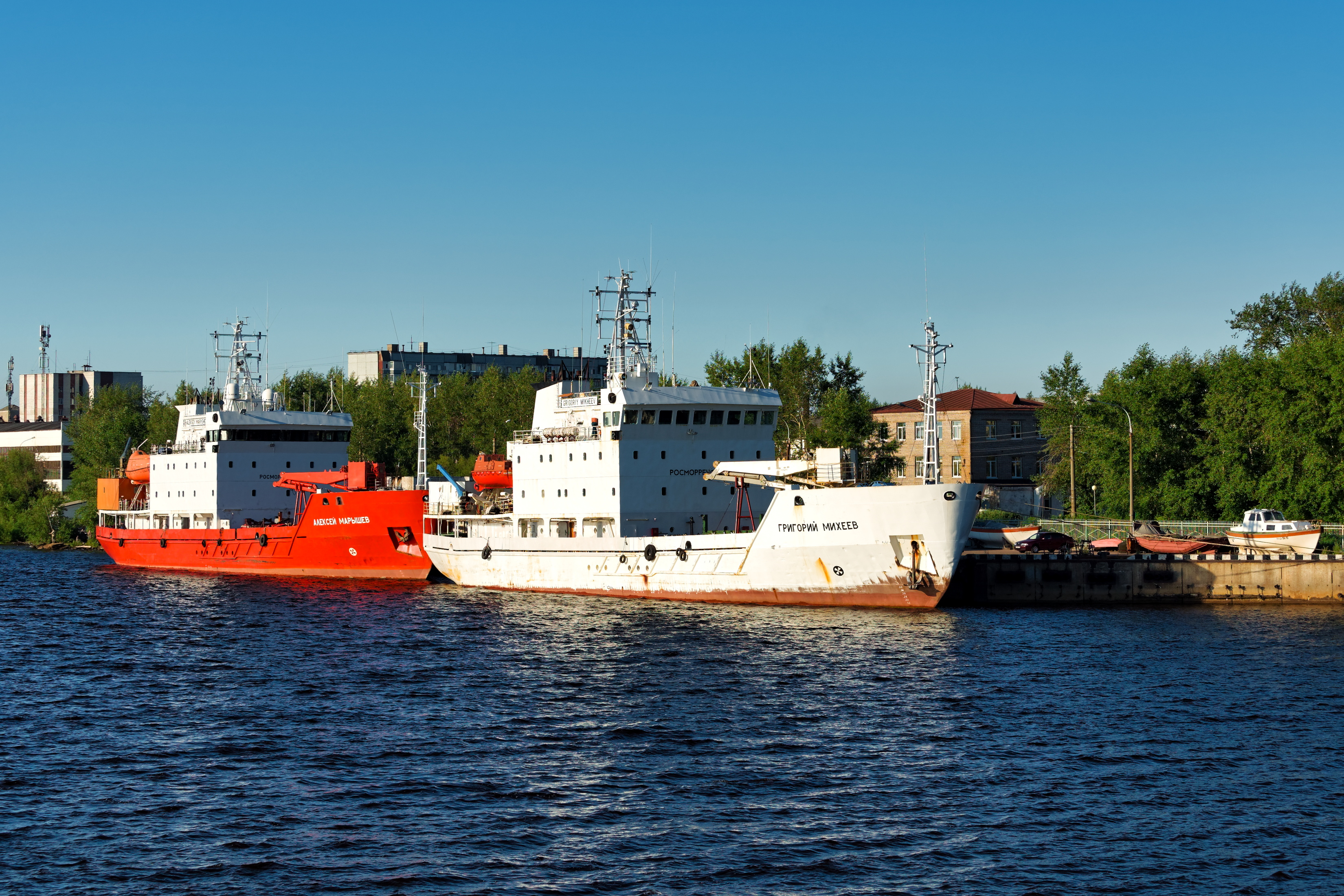
Berth No. 53

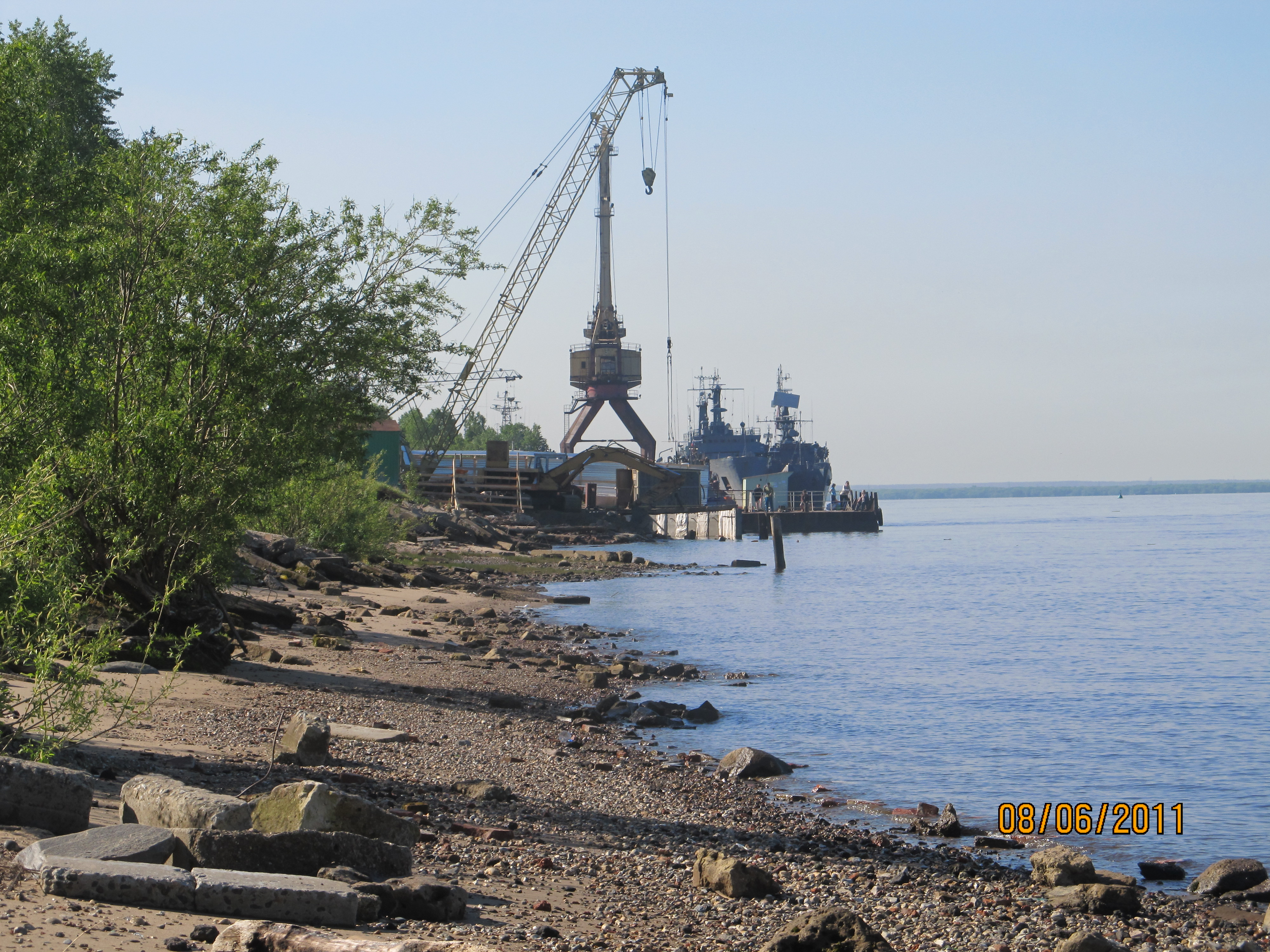
Berth No. 5

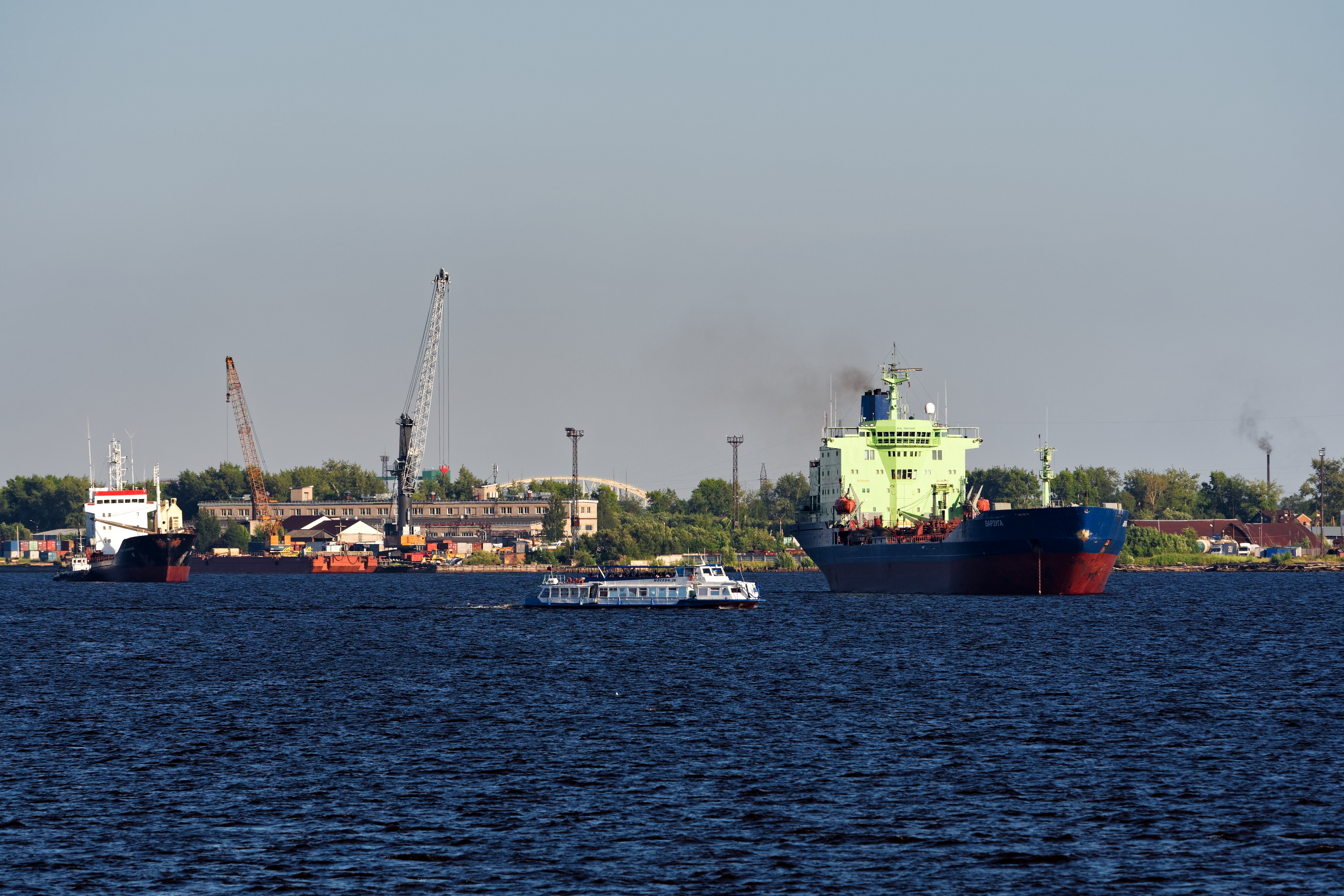
The Left Bank terminal
