= LDG =

LDG may refer to

- Latitudinal diversity gradient, in ecology
- Leshukonskoye Airport, Russia (IATA:LDG)
- Libyan desert glass, in geology
