= Morzhovets Island =

Native name: остров Моржовец
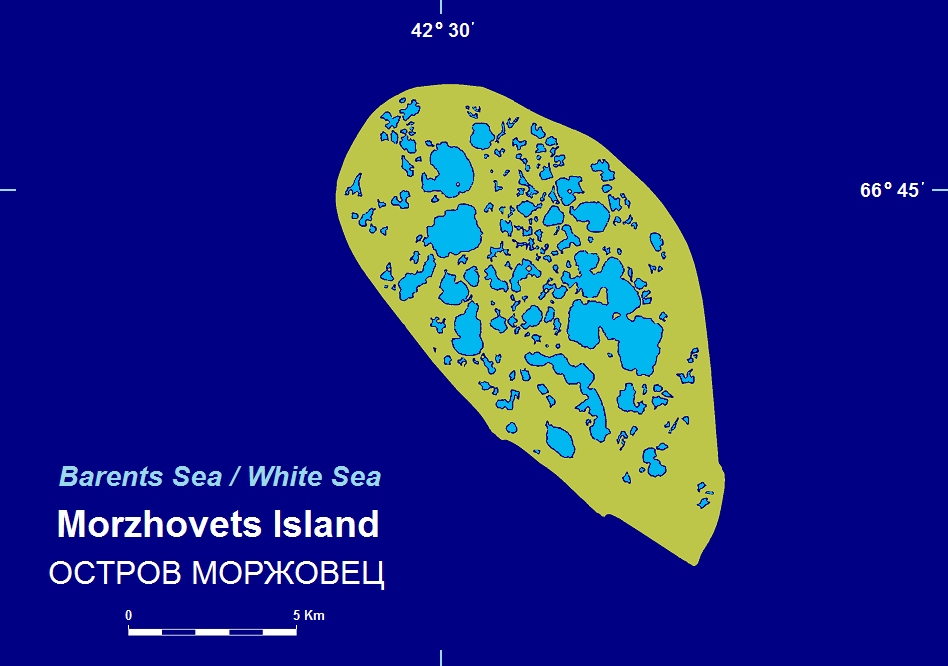
- Map of Morzhovets Island

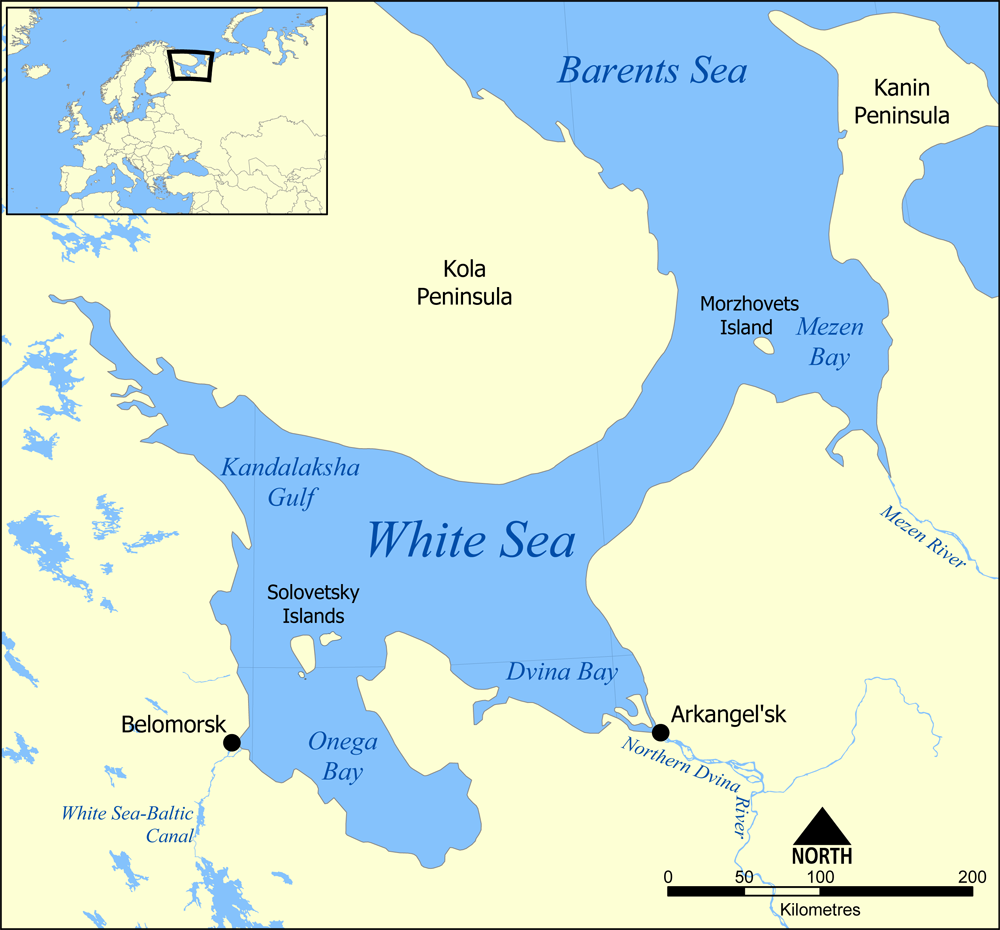
- Location of Morzhovets Island

Geography
- Location: Barents Sea
- Coordinates: 66°43′N 42°32′E
- Area: 110 km^{2} (42 sq mi)
- Length: 18 km (11.2 mi)
- Width: 8.5 km (5.28 mi)
- Highest elevation: 27 m (89 ft)

Administration
- Russia
- Oblast: Arkhangelsk Oblast
- District: Mezensky District
- Largest settlement: Severny Gorodok

Demographics
- Population: 12 (2010)
- Ethnic groups: Pomors

Morzhovets Island (Russian: Остров Моржовец) is an island located in Mezen Bay at the entrance to the White Sea.

Morzhovets island lies 14.5 miles (23.3 km) from mainland Russia.

== Geographical data ==
Morzhovets lies only a few km above the Arctic Circle. This island has an area of 110 square kilometres (42 mi^{2}). The area where this island is located belongs to the Arkhangelsk Oblast, Russian Federation. Administratively, the island is part of Mezensky District.

The island is flat and grassy (covered by tundra) and it has many lakes. The biggest one is Lake Morzhovets. There is a settlement on Morzhovets, Severny Gorodok, which serves the lighthouse and the meteorological station. The population of the settlement is 12.

== History ==
Historically, the Pomors who populated the coast of the Mezen Bay, were fishing along the coast. A sudden change of the weather could drive them off-shore. In this case, Morzhovets island was the last land before they got driven off to the Barents Sea and perish, and thus was considered to be the last resort. In particular, the father of the Russian polymath Mikhail Lomonosov, Vasily Lomonosov, died in the sea, and his body was found on the island. Pomor fishermen built a chapel on the island, which did not survive.

== Bibliography ==
- (in Russian) B. Wwedenski et al. Bolschaja sowetskaja enziklopedija: Tom 28. Isd-wo Bolschaja sowetskaja enziklopedija, Moscow 1954, p. 302
- (in Russian) G. Gilbo Sprawotschnik po istorii geografitscheskich naswani na pobereschje SSSR. Ministerstwo oborony Soiusa SSR, Glaw. upr. nawigazii i okeanografii, 1985, pp. 217-218.
