= Chavanga (river) =

River in northwestern Russia

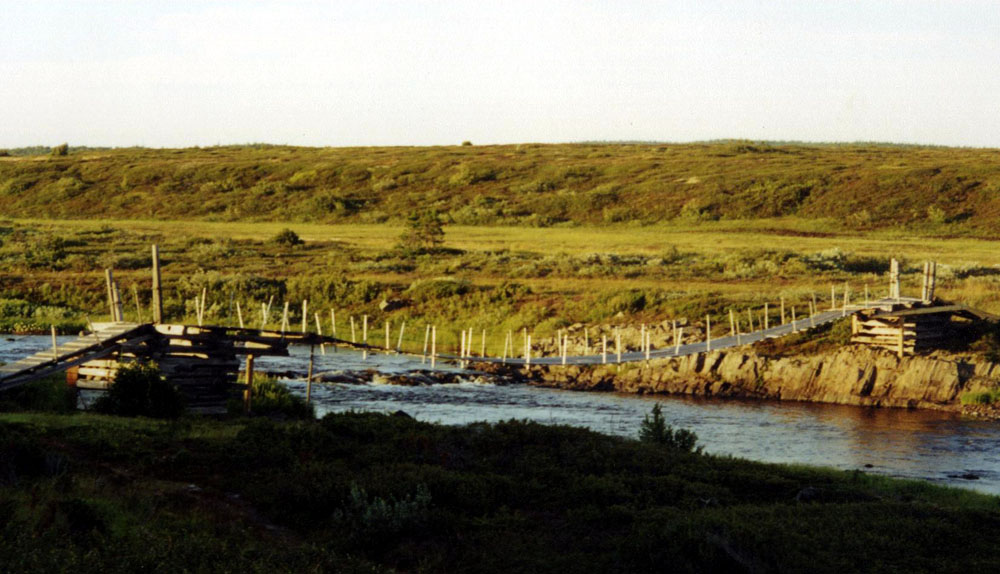
- Native name: Чаваньга (Russian)

Location
- Country: Russia
- Region: Murmansk Oblast

Physical characteristics
- Source: Lake Nizhneye Ondomozero
  - elevation: 162 m (531 ft)
- Mouth
  - location: White Sea
  - coordinates: 66.1073°N 37.7519°E
  - elevation: 0 m (0 ft)
- Length: 52 km (32 mi)
- Basin size: 1,210 km^{2} (470 sq mi)

The Chavanga (Russian: Чаваньга) is a river in the south of the Kola Peninsula in Murmansk Oblast, Russia. It is 52 kilometres (32 mi) long, and has a drainage basin of 1,210 square kilometres (470 sq mi). The Chavanga originates from the Lake Nizhneye Ondomozero and flows into the White Sea in the village Chavanga.
