= Aeroflot Flight 601 =

1983 aviation accident

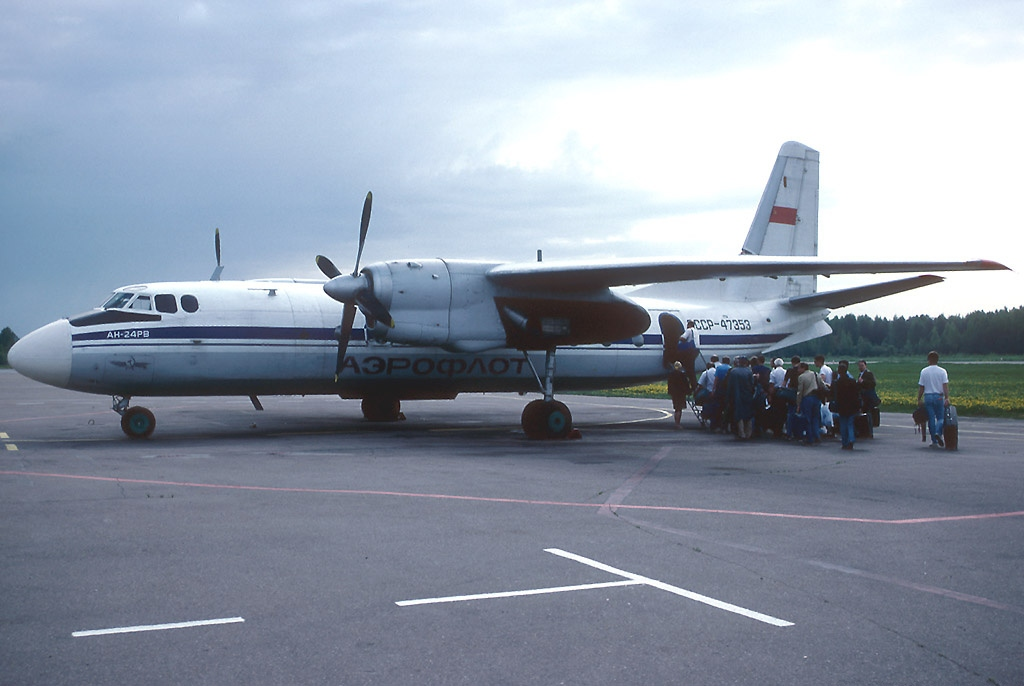
- An Aeroflot Antonov An-24RV, similar to that involved in the accident

Accident
- Date: 24 December 1983
- Summary: Stalled on approach due to pilot error
- Site: Leshukonskoye Airport

Aircraft
- Aircraft type: Antonov An-24RV
- Operator: Aeroflot
- Registration: СССР-46617
- Flight origin: Talagi Airport, Arkhangelsk, Russian SSR
- Destination: Leshukonskoye Airport, Leshukonskoye, Russian SSR
- Occupants: 49
- Passengers: 44
- Crew: 5
- Fatalities: 44
- Survivors: 5

Aeroflot Flight 601 was a scheduled Soviet domestic passenger flight from Arkhangelsk to Leshukonskoye in the Russian SSR, operated by Aeroflot. The Antonov An-24RV that was involved crashed on 24 December 1983 during approach to Leshukonskoye. Forty-four people were killed; five survived the accident. Pilot error was cited as the cause of the accident.

== Crew ==
The aircraft's crew consisted of captain Nikolai Alimov, first officer Alexander Priydak, navigating officer Vladimir Marichev, and flight engineer Fyodor Igumnov plus one flight attendant.

== Crash ==
The visibility at Leshukonskoye airport was 5 km, with drizzle, a wind speed of 3 m/s and air temperature 0 °C (32 °F). Sixteen kilometres away from Leshukonskoye airport and at an altitude of 500 m (1,600 ft), the crew put the landing gear down and set the flaps at 15 degrees. Then the flaps were set to 38 degrees and the aircraft, piloted by captain, started to descend. The aircraft descended with a significant deviation that reached about 490 m to the left. The captain decided to land instead of making a go-around and banked the aircraft to the right. At an altitude of about 30 m (98 ft) the captain decided to make a go-around. The landing gear was retracted and the aircraft started to climb, but reached critical slip angles which compromised aircraft control. The captain then ordered to set the flaps at 15 degrees, but by then the aircraft had stalled. It then started to descend with an increasing left bank angle. At an altitude of 80 m (260 ft) and with a speed of 86.39 knots (160 kmh) the flaps were set to eight degrees. The left bank angle ultimately reached 90 degrees and the aircraft crashed 110 m to the right of the runway. The aircraft broke apart and partially burned. Four passengers and the flight attendant survived the accident.

== Investigation ==
The investigation placed the responsibility for the accident on the captain Alimov, who was found to have a risky style of piloting, which violated the flight instructions. It was also found that the crew should have initiated a go-around instead of attempting to land first. No fault with air traffic control was found.
