= Uyemsky =

Uyemsky Уемский
- Settlement
- Location within Arkhangelsk Oblast Location within Russia
- Coordinates: 64°28′N 40°51′E
- Country: Russia
- Region: Arkhangelsk Oblast
- District: Primorsky District
- Time zone: UTC+3:00

Uyemsky (Russian: Уемский) is a rural locality (a settlement) in Primorsky District, Arkhangelsk Oblast, Russia. The population was 3,742 as of 2010. There are 6 streets.

== Geography ==
Uyemsky is located on the Severnaya Dvina River, 20 km southeast of Arkhangelsk (the district's administrative centre) by road. Silikatny and Malye Karely are the nearest rural localities.
