= Patrakeyevka =

Patrakeyevka Патракеевка
- Village
- Location within Arkhangelsk Oblast Location within Russia
- Coordinates: 64°57′N 40°23′E
- Country: Russia
- Region: Arkhangelsk Oblast
- District: Primorsky District
- Time zone: UTC+3:00

Patrakeyevka (Russian: Патракеевка) is a rural locality (a village) in Talazhskoye Rural Settlement of Primorsky District, Arkhangelsk Oblast, Russia. The population was 93 as of 2010.

== Geography ==
Patrakeyevka is located 63 km north of Arkhangelsk (the district's administrative centre) by road. Navolok is the nearest rural locality.
