= Nes, Russia =

Human settlement in Zapolyarny District, Nenets Autonomous Okrug, Russia

Nes Несь
- Interactive map of Nes
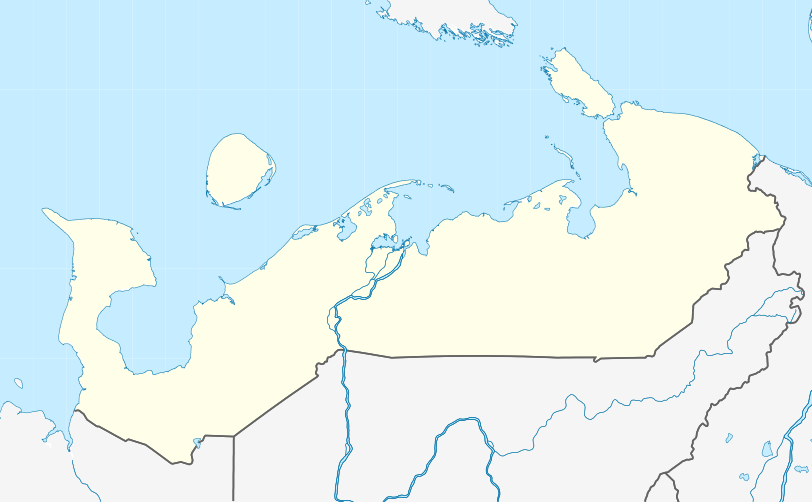
- Location of Nes Nes (Nenets Autonomous Okrug)
- Country: Russia
- Federal subject: Nenets Autonomous Okrug
- Founded: 1769
- Elevation: 6 m (20 ft)

Population (2010 Census)
  - Total: 1,368
  - Estimate (2021): 1,254 (−8.3%)
- Time zone: UTC+3 (MSK)
- Postal code: 166737
- Dialing code: +7 81857
- OKTMO ID: 11811443101

Nes (Russian: Несь) is a rural locality (a selo) in Zapolyarny District, Nenets Autonomous Okrug, Russia. It had a population of 1,368 as of 2010, a decrease from its population of 1,446 in 2002.

== Geography ==
Nes is located about 280 km southwest of Naryan-Mar and about 85 km northeast of Mezen, in the southern portion of the Kanin Peninsula. It is situated on the eponymous River Nes, about 12 km inland. Nes is barely north of the Arctic Circle.

== History ==
The settlement first appeared as a fishing settlement in the second half of the 18th century. By the 1830s, the village had seven farmsteads. Its Orthodox church was built in 1831, but burned down 26 years later, in 1857.

== Transport ==
There is no paved road to Nes, so the only way to get to and from the village is by air. The local airport serves flights to Arkhangelsk (Vaskovo Airport) and Naryan-Mar Airport.

== Climate ==
Nes has a subarctic climate (Dfc).
