= Mezen Bay =

Coordinates: 66°45′N 43°30′E

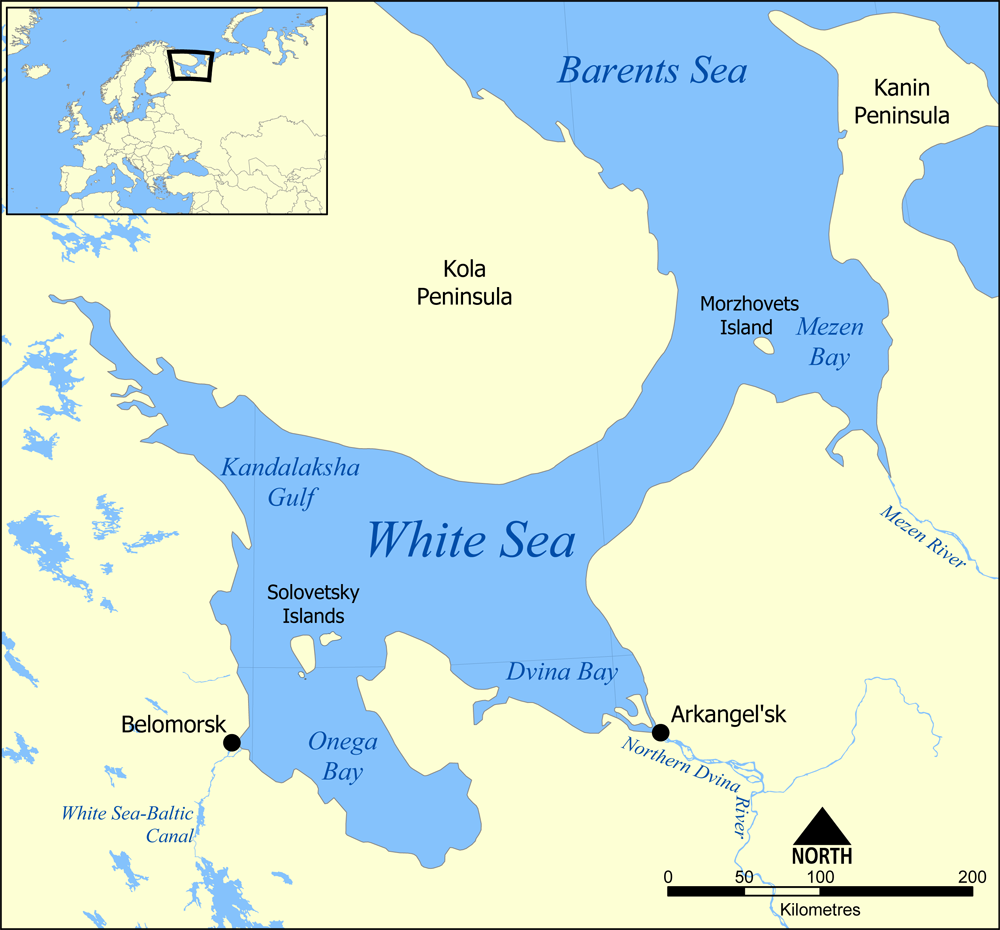
The Mezen Bay on the map of the White Sea.

The Mezen Bay (Russian: Мезенская губа) is located in Arkhangelsk Oblast and Nenets Autonomous Okrug in Northwestern Russia. It is one of four large bays and gulfs of the White Sea, the others being the Dvina Bay, the Onega Bay, and the Kandalaksha Gulf. The Mezen Bay is the easternmost of these, as it lies to the south of the Kanin Peninsula. Morzhovets Island lies at the entrance of the bay. The two main rivers emptying into the Mezen Bay are the Kuloy River, and the Mezen River. The area of the bay is 6,630 square kilometres (2,560 mi^{2}). The Mezen Bay is 105 kilometres (65 mi) long and 97 kilometres (60 mi) wide. The tides in the Mezen Bay are up to 10 metres (33 ft) high and are the biggest in the White Sea. The southern part of the bay, just south of Morzhovets Island, is crossed by the Arctic Circle.

Historically, the Mezen Bay was the fishing area. The pomors who populated the coast fished along it. A sudden change of the weather could drive them off-shore. In this case, Morzhovets island was the last land before they got driven off to the Barents Sea and perish, and thus was considered to be the last resort. Another traditional occupation of the pomors in the Mezen Bay was seal hunting.

The south-western coast of the bay is known as Abramovsky Bereg, and the eastern coast is known as Konushinsky Bereg. The principal villages on the Abramovsky coast are Koyda and Dolgoshhelye, both of the Mezensky District of Arkhangelsk Oblast. On the Konushinsky Coast, the main villages are Yazhma and Chizha, both in the Nenets Autonomous Okrug.

The entire coast of the Mezen Bay is included into a border security zone, intended to protect the borders of Russian Federation from unwanted activity. In order to visit the zone, a permit issued by the local FSB department is required.

There was a project to construct a tidal power station, Mezenskaya Tidal Power Plant, in the Mezen bay which would exploit the great height of the tides. The project has not been realized.
