= Letnyaya Zolotitsa =

Letnyaya Zolotitsa Летняя Золотица
- Village
- Location within Arkhangelsk Oblast Location within Russia
- Coordinates: 64°57′N 36°49′E
- Country: Russia
- Region: Arkhangelsk Oblast
- District: Primorsky District
- Time zone: UTC+3:00

Letnyaya Zolotitsa (Russian: Летняя Золотица) is a rural locality (a village) in Pertominskoye Rural Settlement of Primorsky District, Arkhangelsk Oblast, Russia. The population was 158 as of 2010. There are 4 streets.

== Geography ==
Letnyaya Zolotitsa is located 310 km northwest of Arkhangelsk (the district's administrative centre) by road. Pushlakhta is the nearest rural locality.
