= Moseyevo =

Moseyevo Мосеево
- Village
- Location within Arkhangelsk Oblast Location within Russia
- Coordinates: 65°46′N 46°10′E
- Country: Russia
- Region: Arkhangelsk Oblast
- District: Mezensky District
- Time zone: UTC+3:00

Moseyevo (Russian: Мосеево) is a rural locality (a village) and the administrative center of Moseyevskoye Rural Settlement of Mezensky District, Arkhangelsk Oblast, Russia. The population was 71 as of 2010.

== Geography ==
Moseyevo is located on the Pyoza River, 68 km east of Mezen (the district's administrative centre) by road. Kalino is the nearest rural locality.
