= Sovpolye =

Sovpolye Совполье
- Village
- Location within Arkhangelsk Oblast Location within Russia
- Coordinates: 65°17′N 43°55′E
- Country: Russia
- Region: Arkhangelsk Oblast
- District: Mezensky District
- Time zone: UTC+3:00

Sovpolye (Russian: Совполье) is a rural locality (a village) in Sovpolskoye Rural Settlement of Mezensky District, Arkhangelsk Oblast, Russia. The population was 38 as of 2010. There are 4 streets.

== Geography ==
Sovpolye is located on the Sova River, 96 km southwest of Mezen (the district's administrative centre) by road. Chizhgora is the nearest rural locality.
