= Leshukonskoye Airport =

- IATA: LDG; ICAO: ULAL

Summary
- Airport type: Public
- Location: Leshukonskoye
- Elevation AMSL: 220 ft / 67 m
- Coordinates: 64°53′45″N 45°43′22″E

Map
- Location of airport in Arkhangelsk Oblast

Runways
Direction	Length		Surface
Direction	ft	m	Surface
03/21	2,132	650	Turf
11/29	5,236	1,596	Concrete
- Source: Our Airports web site

Leshukonskoye Airport is an airport in the selo of Leshukonskoye, Arkhangelsk Oblast, Russia. It is located approximately 240 kilometres (150 mi) east of Arkhangelsk, to which it is connected by regular passenger service.

== Airlines and destinations ==
Airlines	Destinations
2nd Arkhangelsk United Aviation Division	Arkhangelsk–Vaskovo

== Accidents and incidents ==
- On 16 October 1970, Lisunov Li-2 CCCP-84777 of Aeroflot crashed on take-off. The aircraft was overloaded and its centre of gravity was beyond the aft limit.

== See also ==
- List of airports in Russia
