= Dmitri Astakhov =

Russian footballer

Personal information
- Full name: Dmitri Nikolayevich Astakhov
- Date of birth: 9 March 1986 (age 40)
- Place of birth: Inzhavino, Tambov Oblast, Russian SFSR
- Height: 1.82 m (5 ft 11 1/2 in)
- Positions: Midfielder; forward

Senior career*
| Years | Team | Apps | (Gls) |
| 2002–2004 | FC Spartak Tambov | 53 | (4) |
| 2004 | PFC CSKA Moscow | 0 | (0) |
| 2005 | FC Lokomotiv Moscow | 0 | (0) |
| 2005 | FC Baltika Kaliningrad | 12 | (1) |
| 2006 | FC Spartak Nizhny Novgorod | 20 | (3) |
| 2007 | FC Ryazan | 13 | (2) |
| 2007 | FC SOYUZ-Gazprom Izhevsk | 10 | (1) |
| 2008 | FC Volga Ulyanovsk | 7 | (0) |
| 2008 | FC Gubkin | 16 | (6) |
| 2009 | FC Mordovia Saransk | 16 | (1) |
| 2010 | FC Gubkin | 23 | (1) |
| 2011–2012 | FC Zenit Penza | 35 | (3) |
| 2012 | FC Spartak Tambov | 16 | (3) |
- * Club domestic league appearances and goals

Dmitri Nikolayevich Astakhov (Russian: Дмитрий Николаевич Астахов; born 9 March 1986) is a former Russian professional football player.

== Club career ==
He played two seasons in the Russian Football National League for FC Spartak Nizhny Novgorod and FC Volga Ulyanovsk.
