= Chavanga =

Chavanga Чаваньга
- Selo
- Interactive map of Chavanga
- Location of Chavanga Chavanga (Murmansk Oblast)
- Coordinates: 66°6′51″N 37°45′34″E
- Country: Russia
- Federal subject: Murmansk Oblast
- Administrative district: Tersky District
- Founded: 17th century
- Elevation: 13 m (43 ft)

Population (2010 Census)
  - Total: 87
  - Estimate (2021): 78 (−10.3%)
- Time zone: UTC+3 (MSK)
- Postal code: 184714
- Dialing code: +7 81559
- OKTMO ID: 47620401126

Chavanga (Russian: Чаваньга) is a rural locality (a Selo) in Tersky District of Murmansk Oblast, Russia. The village is located on the Kola Peninsula, at the mouth of the river Chavanga. It is 13 m above sea level.
