= Kuloy (White Sea) =

- Native name: Кулой (Russian)

Location
- Country: Russia

Physical characteristics
- Mouth: White Sea
  - location: Mezen Bay
  - coordinates: 66°01′58″N 43°27′30″E
  - elevation: 0 m (0 ft)
- Length: 235 km (146 mi)
- Basin size: 19,000 km^{2} (7,300 sq mi)
- Discharge
  - average: 34 m^{3}/s (1,200 cu ft/s)

The Kuloy River basin

The Kuloy (Кулой) is a river in Pinezhsky and Mezensky Districts of Arkhangelsk Oblast in Russia. Its mouth is located in the Mezen Bay of the White Sea. It is 235 kilometres (146 mi) long, and the area of its basin 19,000 square kilometres (7,300 sq mi). The principal tributaries of the Kuloy are the Kyolda (left), the Nemnyuga (right), and the Soyana (left). In the upper course, the Kuloy is known as the Sotka; the total length of the Sotka and the Kuloy is 350 kilometres (220 mi).

In the low course, the Sotka approaches the middle course of the Pinega and passes within several kilometers from the Pinega. In this place, close to the settlement of Pinega, the Kuloy–Pinega Canal was constructed in 1926–1928, however, currently the canal is pretty much neglected. Below the mouth of the canal the river is known as the Kuloy; above the mouth, the river is known as the Sotka. The lower 208 kilometres (129 mi) of the course of Kuloy, downstream from the selo of Kulogory, are navigable; the course adjacent to the canal is not navigable anymore. There is no passenger navigation on the Kuloy.

The river basin of the Kuloy is huge and includes almost all the area in the north-east of Arkhangelsk Oblast between the White Sea and the Mezen and Pinega rivers. This area is spread over five districts, Pinezhsky, Mezensky, Primorsky, and minor areas in Leshukonsky and Kholmogorsky Districts.

From the confluence of the canal, the Kuloy flows north, crosses from Pinezhsky District into Mezensky District, where it accepts the Nemnyuga from the right. Below the mouth of the Soyana, the valley of the Kuloy starts broadening and turns into the estuary, which turns north-east and enters the Mezen Bay. The selo of Dolgoshchelye is located at the right bank of the estuary.

== History ==
The area was populated by Finno-Ugric peoples and then colonized by the Novgorod Republic. In the 13th century the Novgorod merchants already reached the White Sea. The Kuloy was used by Novgorod merchants as the trading route to the basin of the Pechora. From the Northern Dvina, they went upstream the Pinega and took the boats by land to the Kuloy at the place where the canal now is. The boats then were taken from the Kuloy to the Mezen.

The selo of Dolgoshchelye, in the estuary of the Kuloy, is a historical pomor fishermen village.
