= 2nd Arkhangelsk United Aviation Division =

Russian aviation company

2nd Arkhangelsk United Aviation Division 2-й Архангельский объединенный авиаотряд

- A 2AOAO Let L-410 Turbolet
IATA	ICAO	Call sign
-	OAO	DVINA
- Founded: 1935
- Hubs: Vaskovo Airport
- Fleet size: 27
- Headquarters: Arkhangelsk, Russia
- Website: 2aoao.ru

JSC "2nd Arkhangelsk United Aviation Division" (Russian: 2AОАО «2-й Архангельский объединенный авиаотряд», romanized: 2AOAO «2-j Archangeljskij ob‘jedinenný aviaotrjad») is an airline based in Arkhangelsk, Russia. It operates regional passenger and cargo services, as well as overseas humanitarian and peace-keeping work. Its main base is Vaskovo Airport, Arkhangelsk. It is on the List of airlines banned in the European Union.

== History ==
The 2nd Arkhangelsk United Aviation Division of the Northern (since 1973 - Arkhangelsk) Civil Aviation Department of Aeroflot was established in 1969. It consisted of the 68th (Mi-1, Mi-4, Mi-6, Mi-8 helicopters) and 313th (An-2, Yak-12 aeroplanes) flying detachments. Initially based at the airport of Kegostrov, in 1975 it was relocated to Vaskovo. An-2 squads were also based in Onega, Kargopol, Karpogory, Leshukonsky and Mezen. In 1991, due to the disbanding of Aeroflot, it became a separate airline.

Medal "For Life Saving"

In February 2020, three pilots of the airline were awarded the Medal "For Life Saving" by Russian President Vladimir Putin for their courage, bravery and determination in the rescue of people in extreme conditions. Argumenty i Fakty reported that the pilots had been awarded for assisting rescue efforts following the Nyonoksa radiation accident in 2019.

In 2026, it was announced that the 2nd Arkhangelsk United Aviation Division would be the launch customer for the Russian-built Ilyushin Il-114-300 regional airliner. During the XXIX St. Petersburg International Economic Forum, an agreement was signed between the airline and GTLK for the lease of the first three production aircraft, with deliveries scheduled in late 2026. The aircraft is planned for routes linking Arkhangelsk with Murmansk, Naryan-Mar, Syktyvkar, Apatity and the Solovetsky Islands.

== Fleet ==
=== Current fleet ===
As of 2026, the 2nd Arkhangelsk United Aviation Division includes the following aircraft:

Aircraft	In service	Orders	Notes
Antonov An-2R	3	—	
Antonov An-2TP	7	—	
Ilyushin Il-114-300	—	3	Launch customer. To be delivered 2026-2027.
Let L-410UVP-E20	4	—	
Mil Mi-8T	6	—	
Mil Mi-8MTV-1	5	—	
Mil Mi-26T	2	—	
Total	27	3	

== See also ==
- Arkhangelsk Airlines
- Arkhangelsk Airport
