= Lopshenga =

Lopshenga Лопшеньга
- Village
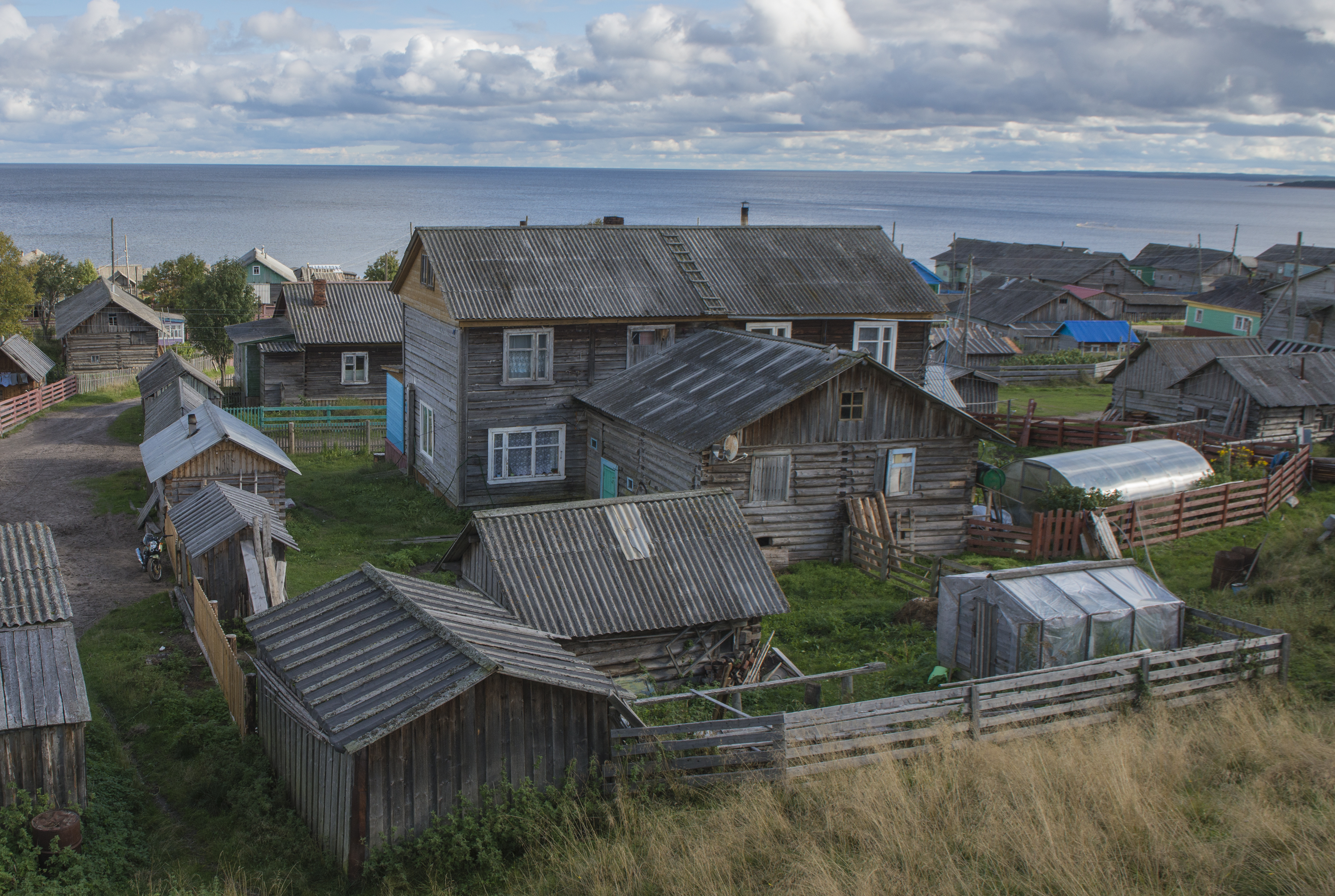

- Location within Arkhangelsk Oblast Location within Russia
- Coordinates: 64°58′N 37°41′E
- Country: Russia
- Region: Arkhangelsk Oblast
- District: Primorsky District
- Time zone: UTC+3:00

Lopshenga (Russian: Лопшеньга) is a rural locality (a village) and the administrative center of Pertominskoye Rural Settlement of Primorsky District, Arkhangelsk Oblast, Russia. The population was 215 as of 2010. There are 3 streets.

== Geography ==
Lopshenga is located 234 km northwest of Arkhangelsk (the district's administrative centre) by road. Yarenga is the nearest rural locality.
