= Pertominsk =

Pertominsk Пертоминск
- Settlement
- Location within Arkhangelsk Oblast Location within Russia
- Coordinates: 64°47′N 38°24′E
- Country: Russia
- Region: Arkhangelsk Oblast
- District: Primorsky District
- Time zone: UTC+3:00

Pertominsk (Russian: Пертоминск) is a rural locality (a settlement) and the administrative center of Pertominskoye Rural Settlement of Primorsky District, Arkhangelsk Oblast, Russia. The population was 252 as of 2010. There are 12 streets.

== Pertominsk concentration camp ==
Pertominsk was the site of a concentration camp established by the Soviet Union in which various political rivals of the Bolsheviks were detained. This was one of the first such camps, established by the Cheka in 1919. Along with the death camp set up by Mikhail Kedrov in Kholmogory it was part of the Northern Camps of Special Designation.

== Geography ==
Pertominsk is located 186 km northwest of Arkhangelsk (the district's administrative centre) by road. Una is the nearest rural locality.
