= Northern Camps of Special Designation =

Northern Camps of Special Designation (Solovetskii Lager´ Prinuditel´nykh Rabot Osobogo Naznacheniia, SLON) refers to ‘special’ institutions of forced labour in the Karelian Autonomous Soviet Socialist Republic. These were originally established by the Cheka in 1921, but the network was expanded in 1923, by which time the Cheka had become the Joint State Political Directorate, also known by its initials in Russian: OGPU. With the establishment of the Solovki prison camp, the SLON became the origin of the more extensive Gulag system of political repression which characterised the Soviet Union until 1960.
