= Soyana =

Soyana Сояна
- Village
- Location within Arkhangelsk Oblast Location within Russia
- Coordinates: 65°46′N 43°23′E
- Country: Russia
- Region: Arkhangelsk Oblast
- District: Mezensky District
- Time zone: UTC+3:00

Soyana (Russian: Сояна) is a rural locality (a village) and the administrative center of Soyanskoye Rural Settlement of Mezensky District, Arkhangelsk Oblast, Russia. The population was 309 as of 2010. There are 7 streets.

== Geography ==
Soyana is located 39 km west of Mezen (the district's administrative centre) by road.
