= Verkhnyaya Zolotitsa =

Verkhnyaya Zolotitsa Верхняя Золотица
- Village
- Location within Arkhangelsk Oblast Location within Russia
- Coordinates: 65°41′N 40°22′E
- Country: Russia
- Region: Arkhangelsk Oblast
- District: Primorsky District
- Time zone: UTC+3:00

Verkhnyaya Zolotitsa (Russian: Верхняя Золотица) is a rural locality (a village) in Talazhskoye Rural Settlement of Primorsky District, Arkhangelsk Oblast, Russia. The population was 29 as of 2010.

== Geography ==
Verkhnyaya Zolotitsa is located 117 km north of Arkhangelsk (the district's administrative centre) by road. Nizhnyaya Zolotitsa is the nearest rural locality.
