= Anna Astakhova =

Russian folklorist

- Born: 22 June 1886 Kronstadt, Russia
- Died: 30 April 1971 (aged 84)
- Occupation: folklorist, educator
- Language: Russian
- Citizenship: USSR

Anna Mikhaylovna Astakhova (Russian: Анна Михайловна Астахова, 4 July [O.S. 22 June] 1886 – 30 April 1971) was a Soviet scholar notable for her studies of the folklore (primarily bylinas) of the Russian North.

Astakhova was born in Kronstadt, close to Saint-Petersburg, in 1886, and graduated from the Women Pedagogical Institute in 1908. Until 1931, she worked as a schoolteacher, from 1931 as a researcher at the Institute of Anthropology and Ethnography. Astakhova then worked as a researcher at the Institute of Russian Literature in Leningrad between 1935 and 1965. She earned the degree of a Doktor nauk (philology) in 1945. Astakhova was a professor at the Pokrovsky Pedagogical Institute in Leningrad (now Saint-Petersburg) between 1945 and 1950. Anna Astakhova died in Leningrad in 1971.

Between 1921 and 1935 and then in 1940s and 1950s, Astakhova and her students organized and performed a number of field studies on the White Sea coast, and also in the river basins of the Pinega, the Mezen, and the Pechora. The goal of these expeditions was to write down the folklore samples such as bylinas. She published academic editions of bylinas, put forward a theory of the development of the genre, and classified the bylinas into types. She also was the first scholar to present a literary analysis of the Northern folklore, in particular, by Marfa Kryukova.

== Selected works ==
- А. М. Астахова, ed. (1938–51). Былины Севера (in Russian).
- Астахова, А. М. (1948). Русский былинный эпос на Севере (in Russian). Petrozavodsk.
- А. М. Астахова, ed. (1958). Илья Муромец. Литературные Памятники (in Russian). Moscow: Наука.
- Астахова, А. М. (1966). Былины: Итоги и проблемы изучения (in Russian). Moscow.
