= White Sea =

Southern inlet of the Barents Sea in northwest Russia

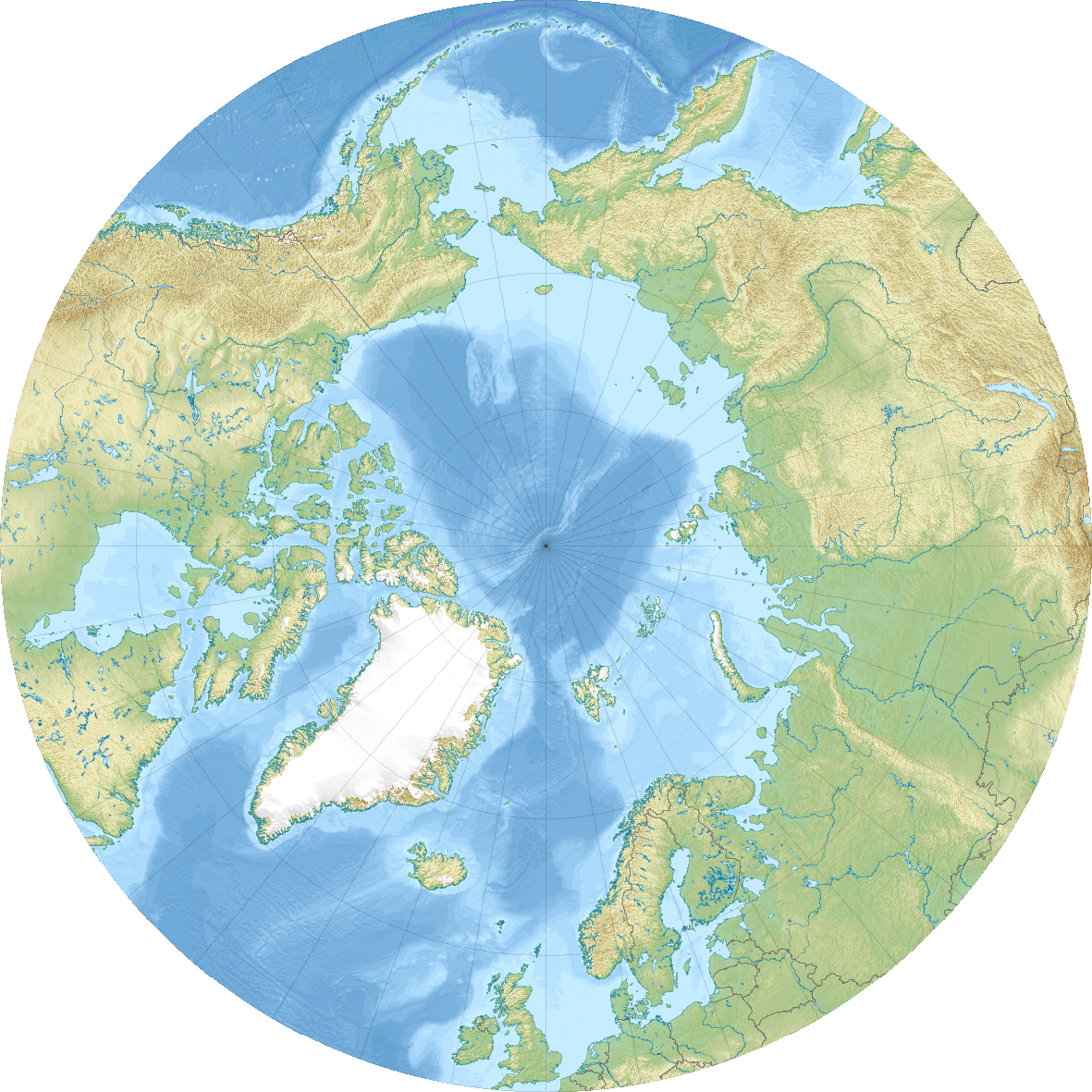
- Location within Arctic

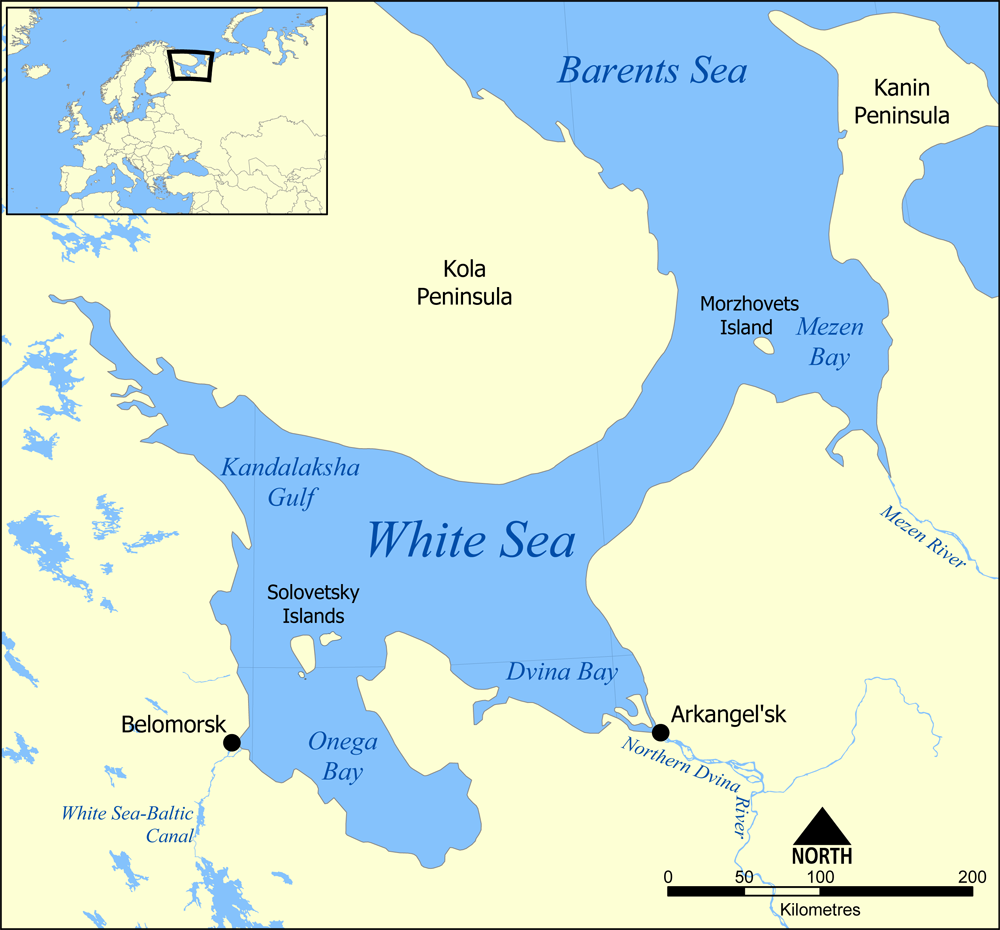
- Location: Eastern Europe
- Coordinates: 65°30′N 37°30′E
- Type: Sea
- Basin countries: Russia
- Surface area: 90,000 km^{2} (34,700 sq mi)
- Average depth: 60 m (197 ft)
- Max. depth: 340 m (1,115 ft)

The White Sea (Note: Russian: Белое море, romanized: Beloye more; Karelian and Finnish: Vienanmeri, lit. 'Dvina Sea'; Nenets: Сэрако ямʼ, romanized: Serako yam) is a southern inlet of the Barents Sea located on the northwest coast of Russia. It is surrounded by Karelia to the west, the Kola Peninsula to the north, and the Kanin Peninsula to the northeast. The whole of the White Sea is under Russian sovereignty and considered to be part of the internal waters of Russia. Administratively, it is divided between the Arkhangelsk and Murmansk oblasts and the Republic of Karelia.

The major port of Arkhangelsk is located on the White Sea. For much of Russia's history this was Russia's main centre of international maritime trade, conducted by the Pomors ("seaside settlers") from Kholmogory. In the modern era it became an important Soviet naval and submarine base. The White Sea–Baltic Canal connects the White Sea with the Baltic Sea.

The White Sea is one of the four seas named (not only in English) after common colour terms—the others being the Black, Red and Yellow seas.

== Geography ==
=== Extent ===
The International Hydrographic Organization defines the northern limit of the White Sea as "A line joining Svyatoy Nos (Murmansk Coast, 39°47'E) and Cape Kanin".

=== Topography ===
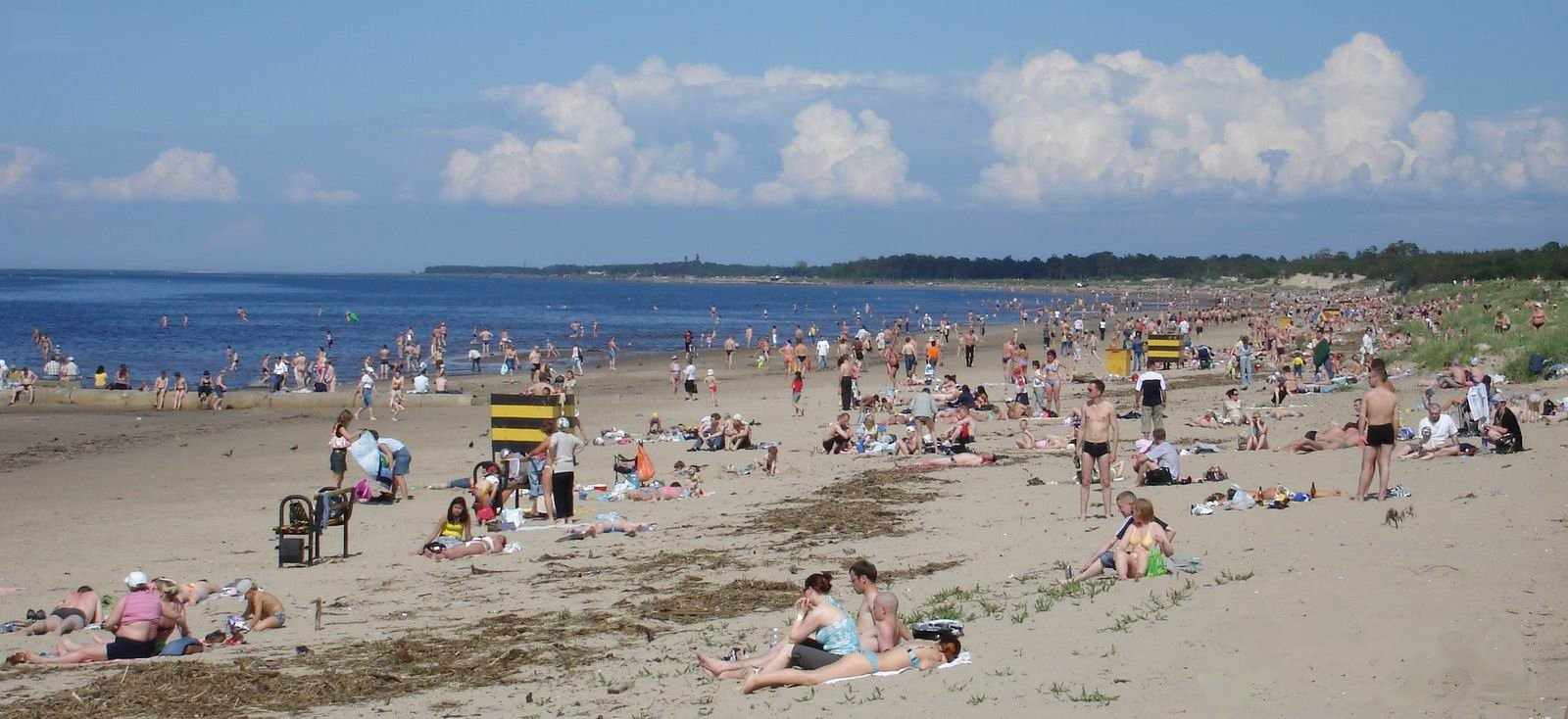
Summer day on a beach near Severodvinsk, on the southeastern shore of the sea

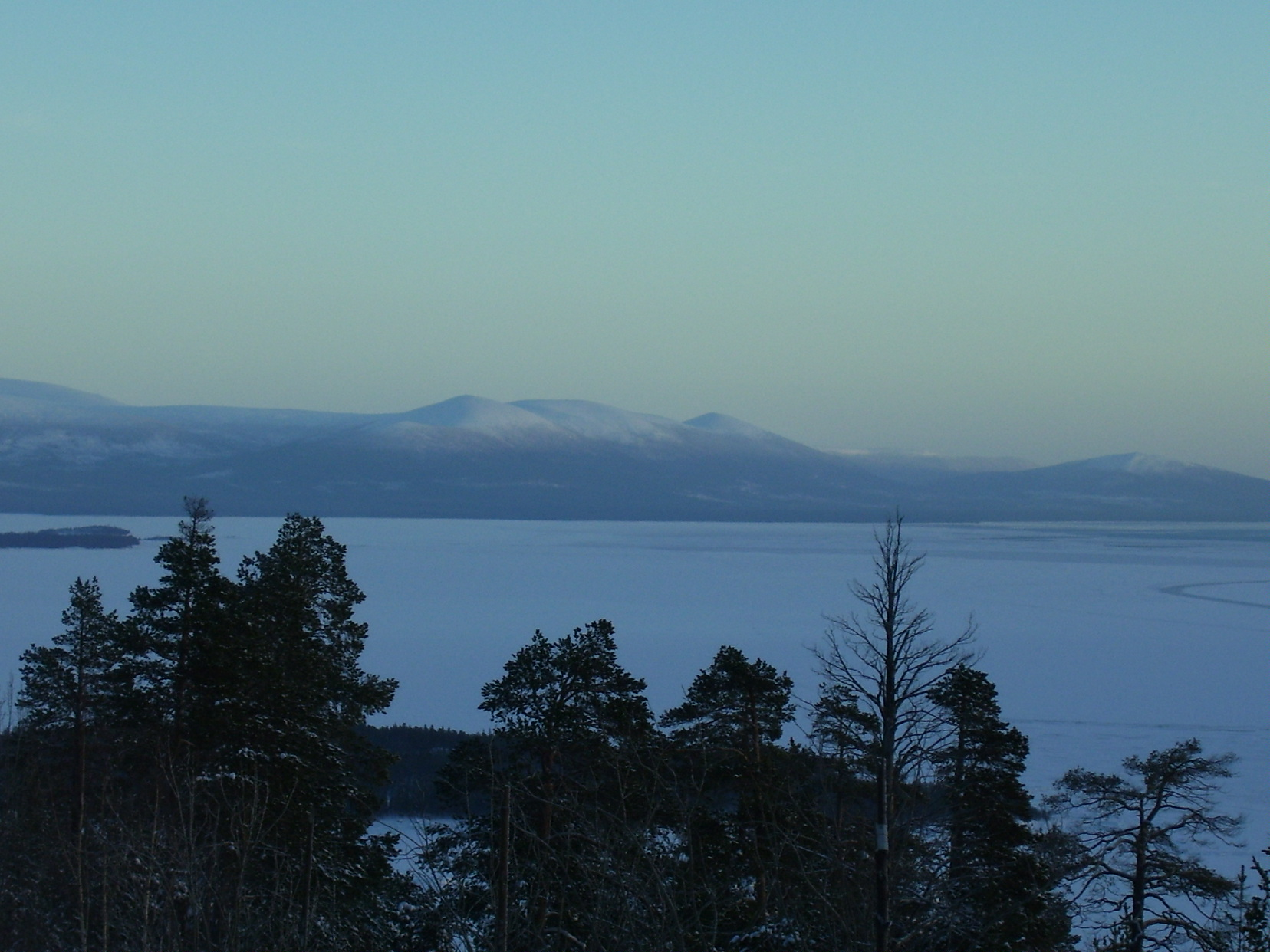
Kandalaksha Gulf

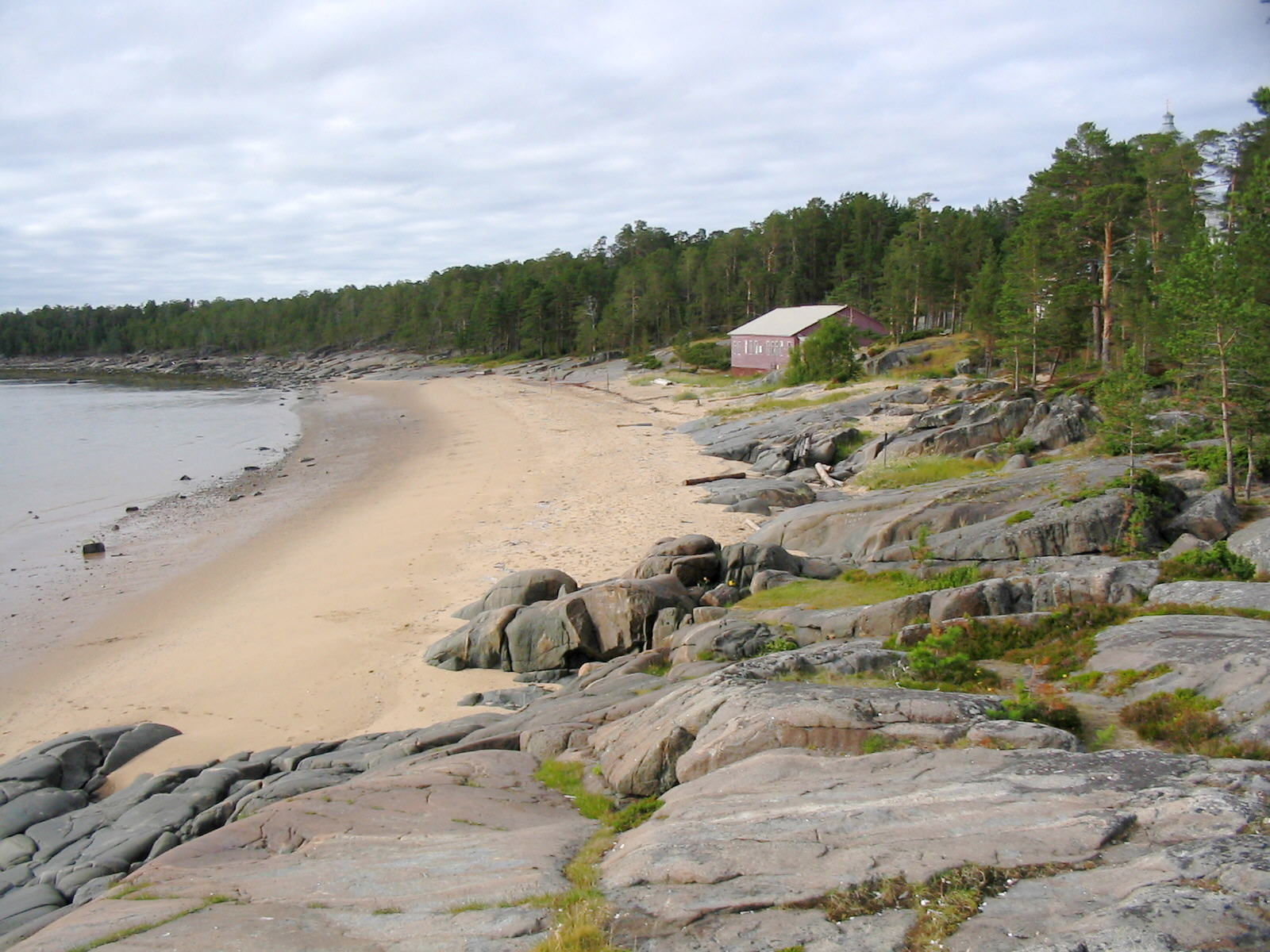
Shore of Onega Bay on Kiy Island

There are four main bays or gulfs on the White Sea. These bays connect with the funnel-shaped opening to the Barents Sea via a narrow strait called "Gorlo" (Russian: Горло, meaning "throat"). Kandalaksha Gulf lies in the western part of the White Sea; it is the deepest part of the sea, reaching 340 metres (1,115 feet). On the south, Onega Bay receives the Onega River. To the southeast, the Dvina Bay receives the Northern Dvina at the major port of Arkhangelsk. On the east side of the 'gorlo', opposite to the Kola Peninsula, is Mezen Bay. It receives the Mezen River and the Kuloy River. Other major rivers flowing into the sea are the Vyg, Niva, Umba, Varzuga and Ponoy.

The seabed of the central part and Dvina Bay is covered in silt and sand, whereas the bottom of the northern part, the Kandalaksha Gulf and Onega Bay is a mixture of sand and stones. Ice age deposits often emerge near the sea shores. Northwestern coasts are tall and rocky but the slope is much weaker at the southeastern side.

The White Sea contains a large number of islands, but most of them are small. The main island group is the Solovetsky Islands, located almost in the middle of the sea, near the entrance to Onega Bay. Kiy Island in Onega Bay is significant due to a historic monastery. Velikiy Island, located close to the shore, is the largest island in the Kandalaksha Gulf.

=== Hydrography and bathymetry ===
The White Sea is a water-filled depression in the block of a continental shelf known as the Baltic Shield. Its bottom is very uneven and contains the Kandalaksha Hollow in the northwest and the Solovetsky Islands in the south. Also, the Onega Bay has many small underwater elevations. The opening and the gorlo of the sea are rather shallow, with depths about 50 metres or less. There is an underwater ridge in the northern part of the gorlo, resulting in maximum depths of 40 metres in that part. This hinders water exchange between the White and Barents seas. The exchange is assisted by the tides, which are semidiurnal (rising twice a day), with the amplitude increasing from 1 metre on the south to 10 metres in Mezen Bay. Currents are rather weak in the open seas with the speed below 1 km/h, but they significantly strengthen in the bays. The tidal waves are much faster than the regular currents and reach the speeds of 9 km/h in Mezen Bay, 3.6 km/h in Onega Bay and 1.3 km/h in the Kandalaksha Gulf.

Rivers bring annually about 215 km^{3} of fresh water, on average, mostly to the Onega, Mezen and Dvina bays. The Northern Dvina alone may contribute up to 171 km^{3} in some years, with the Mezen, Onega, Kem and Vyg rivers adding up to 38.5, 27.0, 12.5 and 11.5 km^{3}, respectively. About 40% of this volume is brought during the snow melting in May, and the inflow is minimal in February–March. This inflow raises and lowers the sea level that promotes the water exchange with the Barents Sea. As a result, annually, about 2,000 km^{3} and 2,200 km^{3} flow in and out of the White Sea, respectively. The inflow of fresh water in spring decreases the surface salinity in the top 5–10-metre layer to 23‰ (parts per thousand) in the eastern and 26–27‰ in the western parts of the sea, reaching 10–12‰ in Dvina Bay; it also increases the content of silicon and silicates in water, which is a characteristic feature of the White Sea.

Storms are the strongest in October–November. Shallow sea depths reduce the wave height to the average of 1 metre, sometimes reaching 3–5 metres. The sea is quiet in July–August.

=== Climate ===
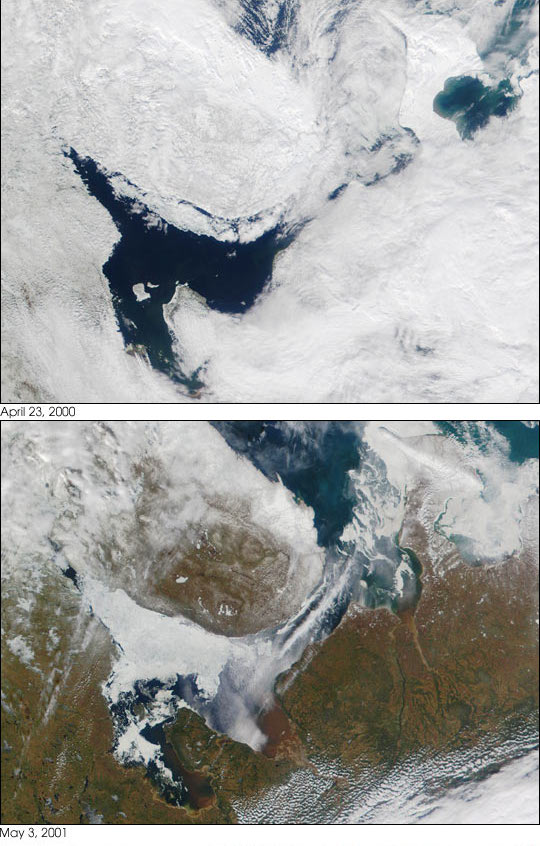
Two satellite photos of the White Sea taken on 23 April 2000 (top) and 3 May 2001 (bottom)

The climate varies between polar and subarctic with frequent fogs and clouds. Winds are predominantly southwestern in winter with speeds of 4–8 m/s. They bring cold air from the south, establishing the temperature of about −15 °C (February) over most of the sea. The northern part is warmer at about −9 °C, sometimes reaching −6 °C, due to the warm air masses from the Atlantic. Arctic anticyclones, however, change winds to the northeastern ones, bringing much colder weather with temperatures of about −25 °C. Summers are cold, cloudy and relatively humid, with northeastern winds and frequent rains. Average July temperatures are 8–10 °C. Occasional southeastern winds bring warm air from Europe, raising the temperature to 17–19 °C and sometimes even to 30 °C. Annual precipitations increase from 282 mm in the north 529 in the south.

In winter, from October–November to April–May, the sea freezes, with the average January water temperatures of −1.9 °C in the north, between −1.3 and −1.7 °С in the centre, and between −0.5 and −0.7 °С in the bays. These variations are due to the distribution of water salinity across the sea, which increases from 24 to 26‰ in the centre to 30.5‰ in the gorlo, reaching 34.0–34.5‰ toward the Barents Sea. The freezing period varies from year to year as shown in the satellite image to the right. The ice is not stationary, but 90% of it is floating and is continuously removed to the Barents Sea. Ice thickness is usually about 40 cm but may reach 150 cm in cold winters.

In summer, surface water warms up to 15 °С in the central part, but remains relatively cold in the north, at 7–8 °С, due to the water exchange between the surface and the cold bottom part which is enhanced by the shallow depths in the northern parts. Deep sea (about 100 m or more) is characterised by stable temperature (−1.4 °С) and salinity (30‰). The depth distribution of water temperature is very inhomogeneous across the sea. For example, at the exit from Dvina Bay, water temperature drops to 0 °C at the depth of only 12–15 m, but the same temperature is reached at 65 m at the exit from the Kandalaksha Gulf.

== History ==
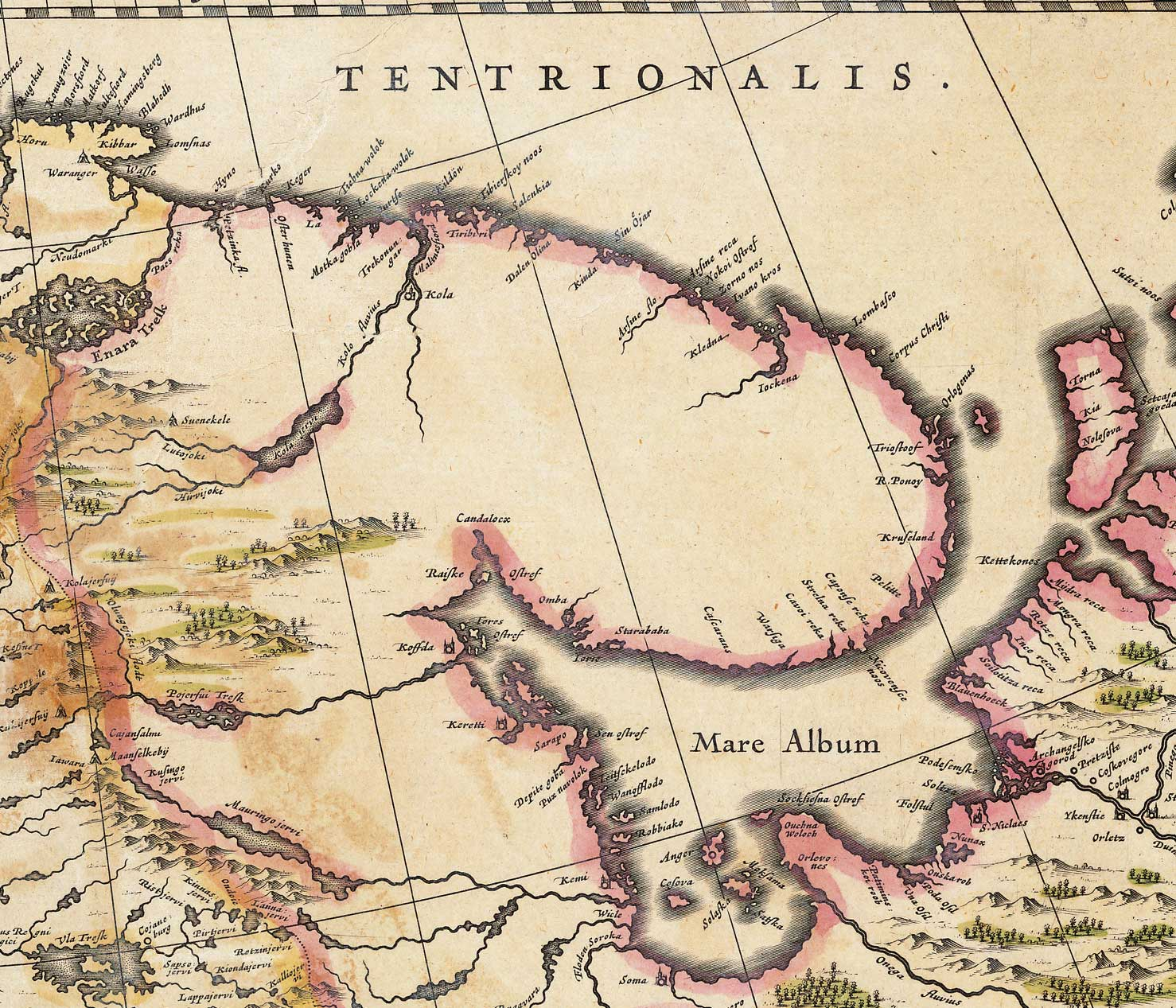
A map of the White Sea (1635)

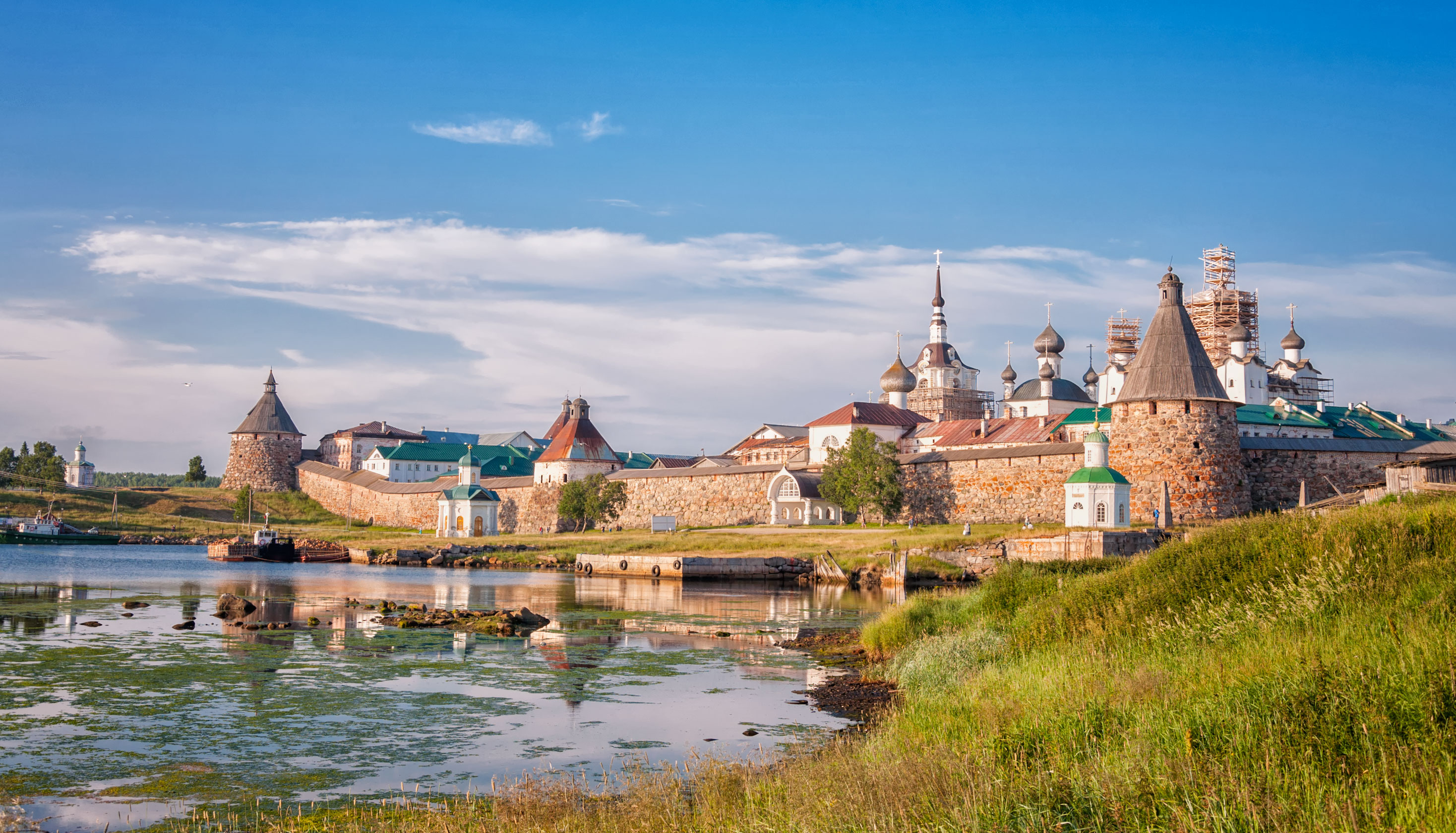
Solovetsky Monastery

Residents of Novgorod knew of the White Sea from at least the 11th century and rapidly explored its commercial significance for navigation and its coastal forests rich in fur animals. One of the earliest settlements near the sea shores grew up in the late 14th century at Kholmogory, on the Northern Dvina. From there, in 1492, a merchant fleet laden with grain and carrying ambassadors of Ivan III of Russia sailed to Denmark, marking the establishment of the first international seaport in Russia.

The first foreign ship to arrive in Kholmogory was the English Edward Bonaventure commanded by Richard Chancellor in 1553. Together with two other ships under the command of Hugh Willoughby, his crew had sought a northern route to the Indies, especially India and China. The expedition, sponsored by King Edward VI of England and a group of about 240 English merchants, had London's authorisation to establish trade connections. The ships of Willoughby were separated and the other two were lost at sea, but Edward Bonaventure managed to pass the White Sea and reach Kholmogory, from where Chancellor was escorted to Moscow to meet the Russian Tsar, Ivan IV. Returning from Russia in 1554, Chancellor brought back a detailed description of Moscow and the Russian north, which were largely unknown to Europe, as well as a letter from the Tsar expressing desire to establish trade relations with England. In 1555 Queen Mary issued a charter authorising the Muscovy Company to trade with Russia via the White Sea route.

Dutch ships soon followed the English, and the port of Kholmogory became busy with shipments of fur and fish. Local and foreign shops and factories were established in the city at that time. The port was reinforced with a fortress which sustained a siege by the Polish-Lithuanian army in 1613. Increasing traffic overloaded the port, which relied on shallow river-waters and had limited ship-capacity. However, instead of expanding the old port, Ivan IV established a new one down-river in 1584, called New Kholmogory, which from 1596 began to become known as Arkhangelsk.

Between the 15th and early 18th centuries, the White Sea served as the major trade route in and out of Russia. This role decreased later after the foundation of Saint Petersburg (1703), which opened a more direct ice-free connection between Russia and the bulk of Western Europe via the Baltic Sea. From the 1920s, most northern Russian sea shipments diverted from the White Sea to the new port of Murmansk (officially founded in 1916), where the waters did not freeze in winter.

== Legislative status ==
The entire water area of the White Sea is the territorial waters of the Russian Federation. Any movement of foreign vessels on the White Sea is carried out in accordance with the legislation of the Russian Federation.

== Fauna ==
The sea hosts more than 700 species of invertebrates and about 60 species of fish. Many species of marine mammals can be found, including cetaceans (belugas, harbour porpoises, orcas, northern bottlenose, bowhead, and humpback whales) as well as pinnipeds (harp, ringed, gray and bearded seals, occasionally walruses).

== Economy ==
The White Sea is an important traffic centre of northwestern Russia, interconnecting various economic regions and providing an outlet to the foreign routes. The fishing industry is relatively small, mostly targeting herring, saffron cod, European smelt, Atlantic cod and Atlantic salmon. There is a developing seaweed industry. The White Sea–Baltic Canal links it through Lake Onega to the Baltic Sea and the major city and port of Saint Petersburg. The Baltic Sea, in turn, is connected by the Volga–Baltic Waterway to the Volga River, Black, Caspian, and Azov seas. The major ports on the White Sea are Arkhangelsk, Belomorsk, Onega, Mezen, Kem, Kandalaksha and Umba. Despite being frozen in winter, the sea remains navigable all year around because of deployment of icebreakers.
