= Pinega =

Rural locality in Arkhangelsk Oblast, Russia

Pinega Пинега
- Settlement
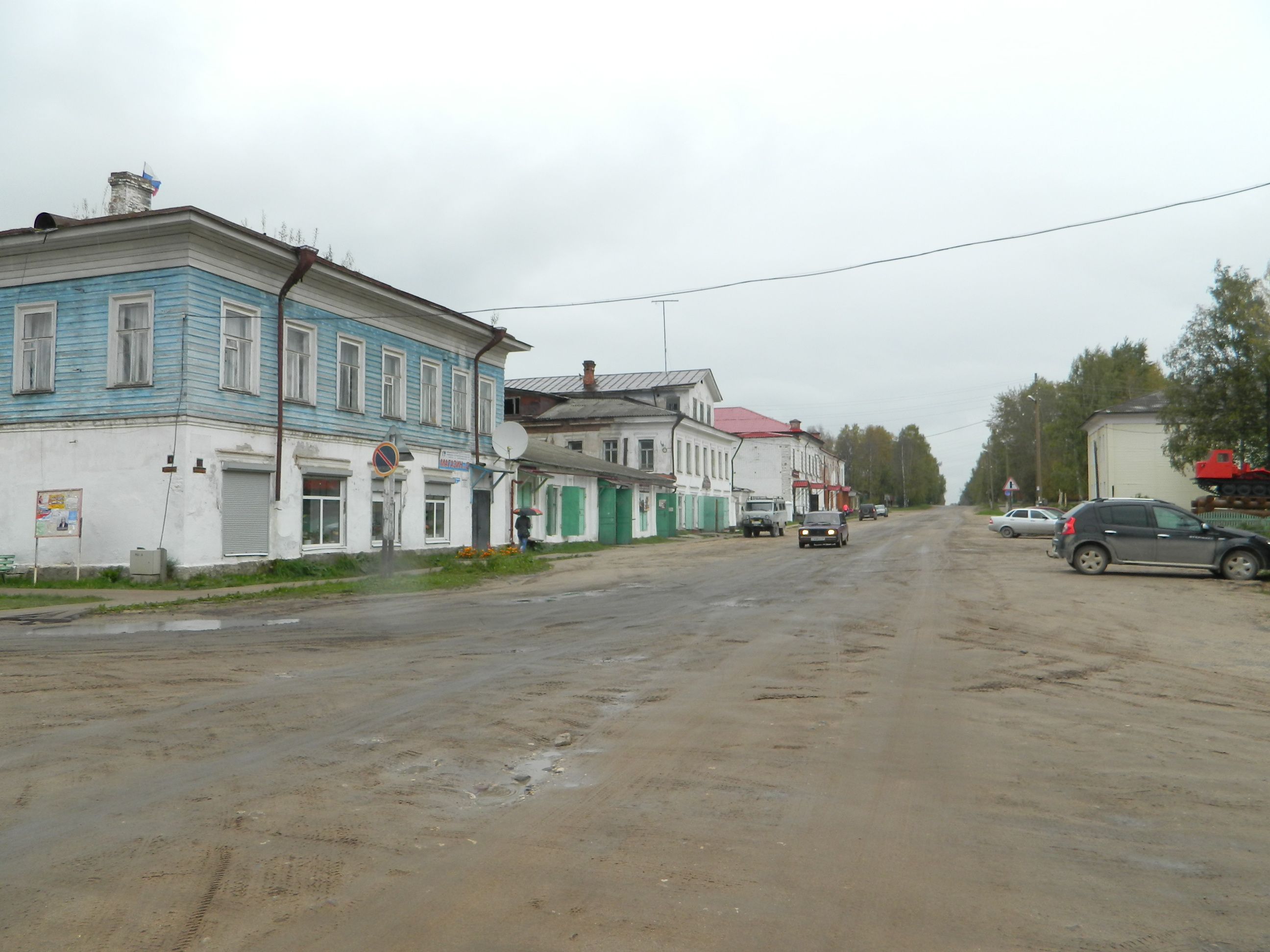

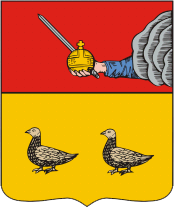
- Coat of arms
- Interactive map of Pinega
- Location of Pinega Pinega (Arkhangelsk Oblast)
- Coordinates: 64°42′00″N 43°23′42″E
- Country: Russia
- Federal subject: Arkhangelsk Oblast
- Administrative district: Pinezhsky District
- Selsoviet: Pinezhsky Selsoviet

Population (2010 Census)
  - Total: 3,225
  - Estimate (2012): 3,786 (+17.4%)

Administrative status
  - Capital of: Pinezhsky Selsoviet

Municipal status
  - Municipal district: Pinezhsky Municipal District
  - Rural settlement: Pinezhskoye Rural Settlement
  - Capital of: Pinezhskoye Rural Settlement
- Time zone: UTC+3 (MSK)
- Postal code: 164610
- OKTMO ID: 11648427101

Pinega (Пинега) is a rural locality (a settlement), formerly a town, in Pinezhsky District of Arkhangelsk Oblast, Russia, located on the right bank of the Pinega River (hence the name). It serves as the administrative center of Pinezhsky Selsoviet, one of the seventeen selsoviets into which the district is administratively divided. Municipally, it is the administrative center of Pinezhskoye Rural Settlement, one of the fifteen rural settlements in the district. Population: 3,225 (2010 census); 3,763 (2002 census); 4,401 (1989 Soviet census)..

== History ==
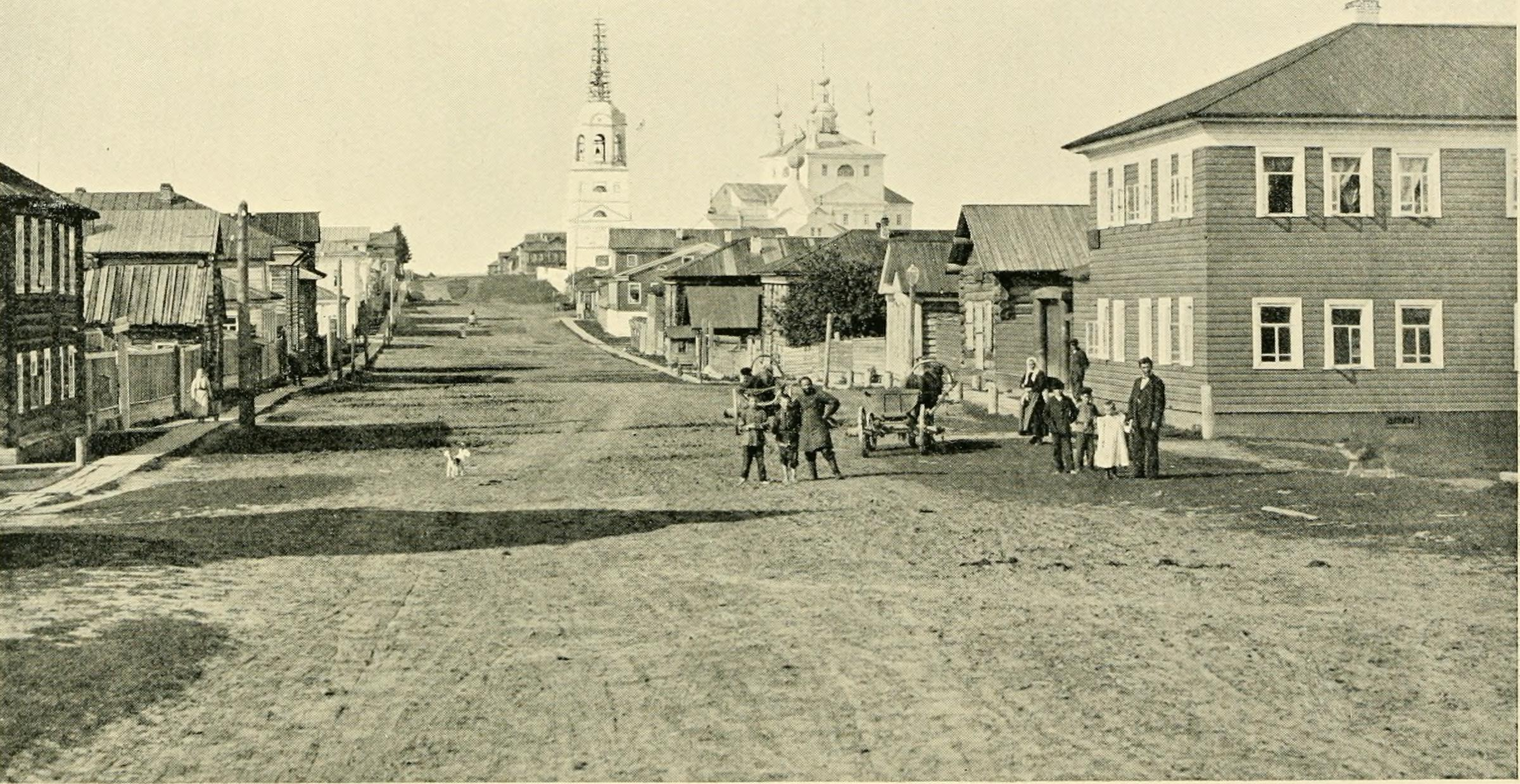
View of the station house in old Pinega. Photo from Travels of a naturalist in northern Europe, Norway, 1871, Archangel, 1872, Petchora, 1875 by J. A. Harvie-Brown, published 1905.

Pinega was known from 17th century as the pogost of Pinezhsky Volok. In the course of the administrative reform performed in 1708 by Peter the Great the area was included into Archangelgorod Governorate, with the creation of Kevrolsky Uyezd. The center of the uyezd was located in Kevrola, now a village. In 1780, the Governorate was abolished and transformed into Vologda Viceroyalty, with the creation of Pinezhsky Uyezd in place of the Kevrolsky Uyezd. The center of the uyezd was Pinega, which thereby became a town. In 1796, Pinezhsky Uyezd moved into the Arkhangelsk Governorate. In 1897, the population of Pinega was 992. In 1925 the town of Pinega, while still being the center of the uyezd, was downgraded to a selo, and in February 1927, Pinezhsky Uyezd was abolished and merged into Arkhangelsky Uyezd.

During Russian Civil War in 1918, battles were fought between the Red Army and British troops in Pinega and around. For a short period, Pinega was occupied by British and American troops.

In 1929, several governorates were merged into Northern Krai. July 15, 1929 the uyezds were abolished, and Pinezhsky District was established. Pinezhsky District became a part of the Arkhangelsk Okrug of the Northern Krai. In 1930, the Okrug was abolished, and the district became subordinate to the central administration of the Northern Krai. In 1936, the Krai was transformed into Northern Oblast. In 1937, Northern Oblast was split into Arkhangelsk Oblast and Vologda Oblast. Then, in 1959, Karpogorsky and Pinezhsky Districts were merged into one district with the administrative center located in Karpogory.

From 1960 to 1993 Pinega was an urban-type settlement, after which it was downgraded to a rural type settlement again.

== Economy ==
=== Transportation ===
The Pinega River is navigable below the village of Sogra, although there is no regular passenger navigation. Pinega is located at the point where the river sharply turns south-west. At this point, it passes several kilometers from the course of the Kuloy River. In 1926—1928 a canal connecting the Pinega with the Kuloy was constructed, however, currently the canal is pretty much neglected.

An unpaved road along the right bank of the Pinega connects Arkhangelsk with the valley of the Mezen. From this road, another one, also unpaved, branches off and follows the Pinega to Karpogory, the village of Zanyukhcha, and then crosses the border with the Komi Republic to the timber production settlements.

== Culture and recreation ==
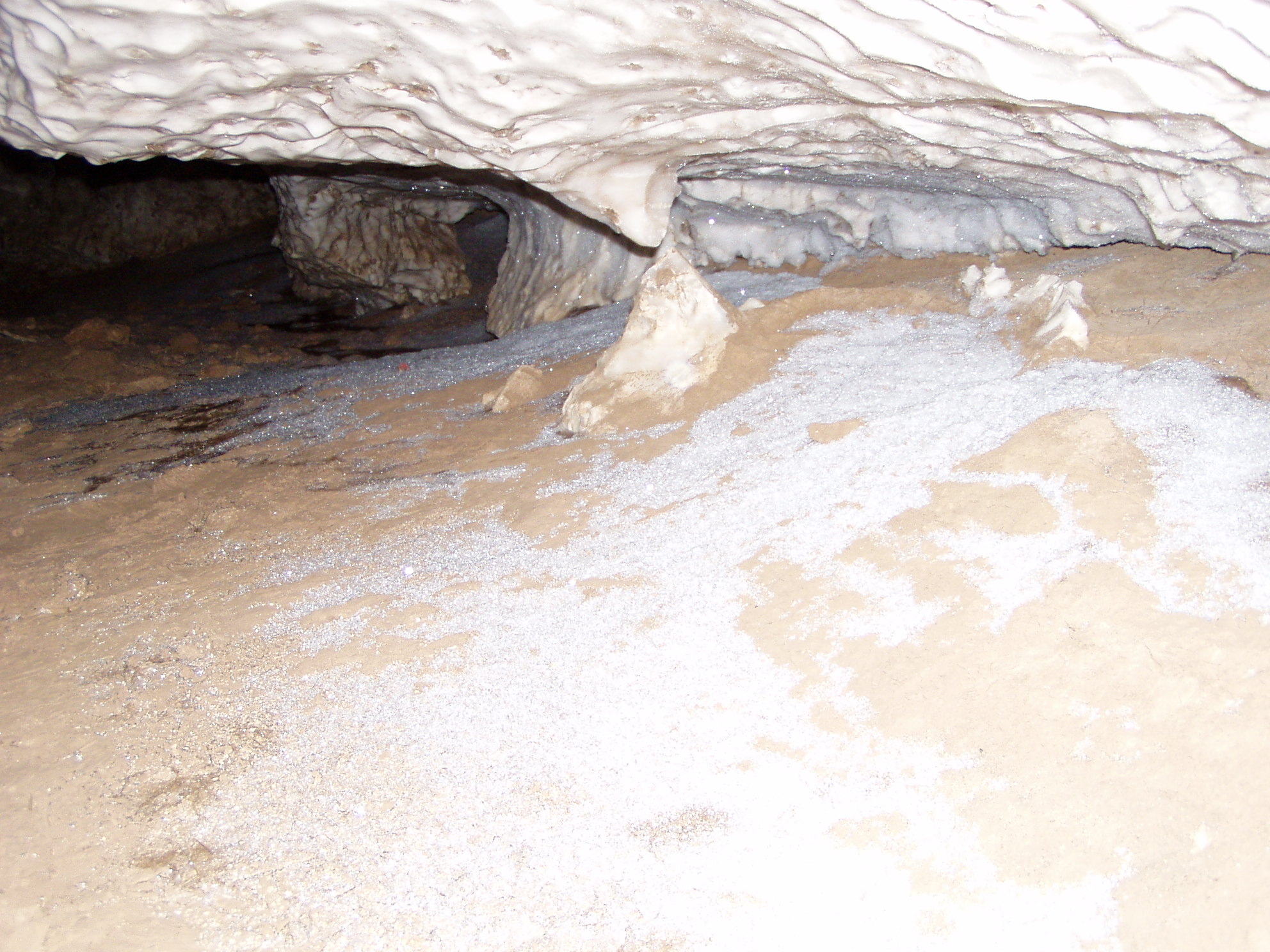
The Pinega cave

15 kilometers (9.3 mi) from Pinega, in the village of Maletino, there is Krasnogorsky Monastery which is classified as cultural and historical heritage by Russian Federal law. The monastery is neglected.

The District Museum of the Pinezhsky District is located in Pinega.

Downstream from Pinega there are karst caves which are a major tourist attraction. The karst landscape of the right bank of the Pinega River is protected in Pinezhsky Nature Reserve.
