= Yedoma (rural locality) =

Yedoma (Russian: Едома) is the name of several rural localities (villages and selos) in Russia:

- Yedoma, Leshukonsky District, Arkhangelsk Oblast, a village in Leshukonsky Selsoviet of Leshukonsky District of Arkhangelsk Oblast
- Yedoma, Pinezhsky District, Arkhangelsk Oblast, a village in Kevrolsky Selsoviet of Pinezhsky District of Arkhangelsk Oblast
- Yedoma, Vologda Oblast, a selo in Zheleznodorozhny Selsoviet of Sheksninsky District of Vologda Oblast
