= Artemius of Verkola =

Russian child saint (1532–1544)

Righteous Artemius of Verkola
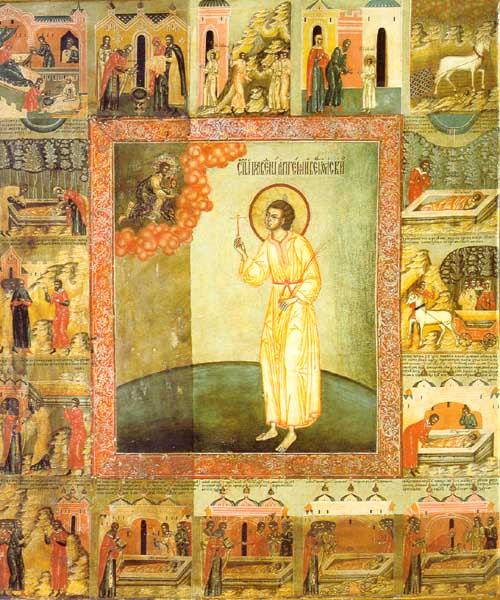
- Russian hagiographic icon, 17th century
- Born: 1532; Verkola, Russia
- Died: 23 June 1545; Verkola, Russia
- Venerated in: Eastern Orthodox Church
- Canonized: c. 1619 by Russian Orthodox Church
- Feast: 23 June
- Patronage: Seriously ill; eye diseases; sick children; Verkola

Artemius of Verkola (Russian: Артемий Веркольский, romanized: Artemy Verkolsky; 1532 – 23 June 1545) is a Russian child saint venerated in the Russian Orthodox Church.

== Life ==
Artemius was born in 1532 in the village of Verkola in the Russian North (now Pinezhsky District, Arkhangelsk Oblast). His family were peasants. His father's name was Kosma, nicknamed Maly (lit. 'the small [one]'); his mother was named Apollinaria. In addition, according to legend, the sister of Artemius was the righteous maiden Paraskeva of Pirinem, who was also famous for posthumous miracles. Nothing is known about Artemius' life, except for his rejection of children's games, meekness, good faith, obedience to his parents, and diligence, as noted in his Life.

On 23 June 1545, when Artemius was 12 years old, the boy was harrowing a field with his father. At that time, a strong thunderstorm began, lightning struck and Artemius fell dead. The superstitious villagers of Verkola considered the unexpected death of the boy a punishment for some secret sins, so they left his body in the forest without funeral service and burial, barely covered with brushwood and birch bark and fenced. According to folk belief, the burial of those who died from a thunderstorm in a common cemetery could bring misfortune to the inhabitants of the village. Archaeological excavations have shown that in the 16th century, not far from Verkola, there was a cemetery of the mortgaged dead buried in a log cabin.

== Veneration ==
35 years after his death, in 1577, a local deacon named Agafonik saw a light emanating from the boy's resting place and discovered the boy's body showed no sign of decay. Miracles of healing happened to people who venerated the boy's relics and he was proclaimed a saint. The canonization of the saint took place around 1619, when the Life of the saint was completed.

In 1648, by order of Tsar Alexis Mikhailovich of Russia, the St. Artemius of Verkola Monastery was founded, and the relics of the saint were moved to the monastery on 17 November. The monastery was later closed in 1919 following the October Revolution and the relics were hidden in 1920. Services resumed in 1990.

== Iconography ==
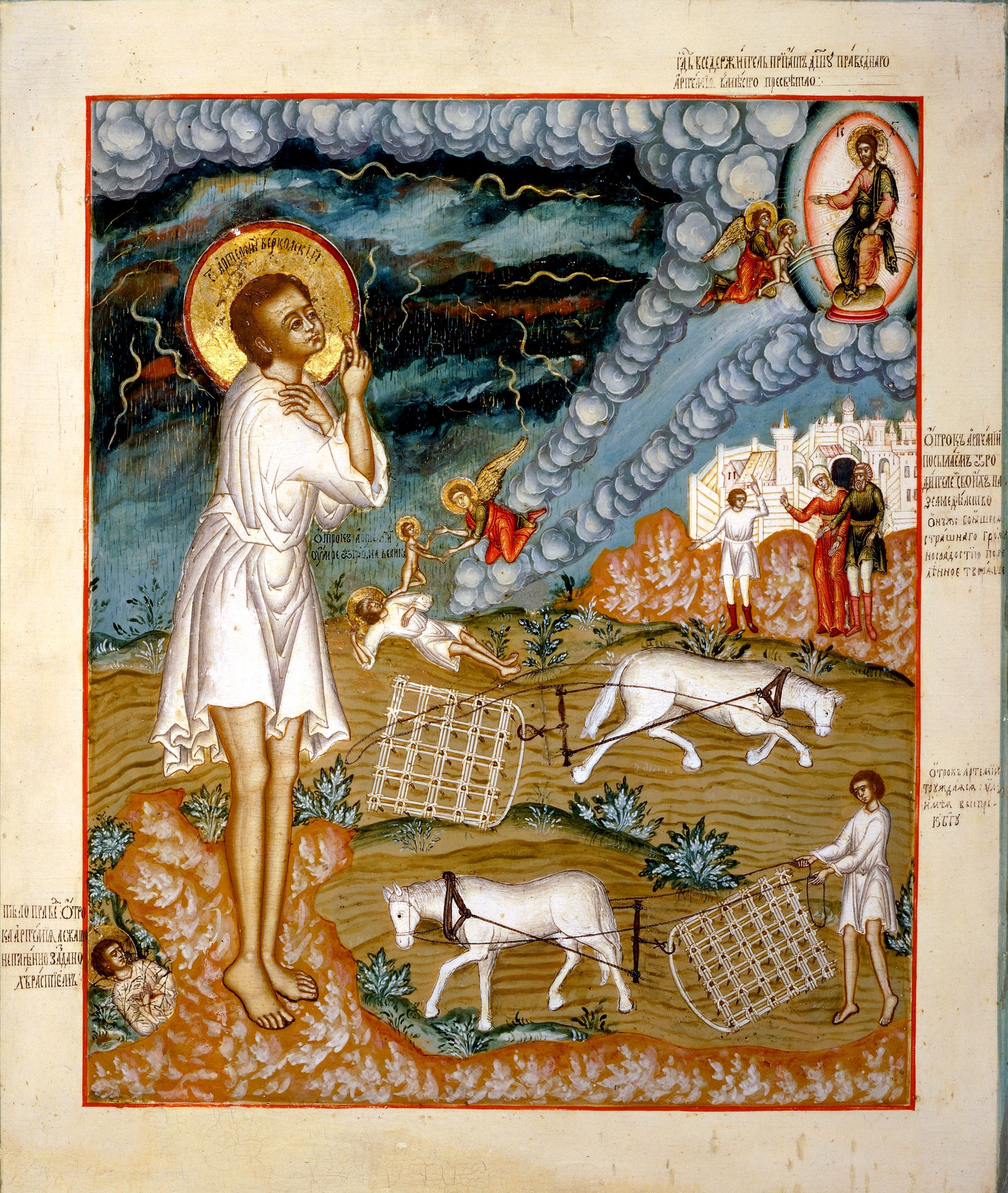
Russian Icon of the 18th Century

The saint is traditionally depicted as a youth with a rounded face and short, slightly wavy hair, wearing a short white (sometimes red) shirt and barefoot; he holds a cross and a branch or a lightning arrow in his hands. Icons of Artemy of Verkola gained wide circulation in a composition showing him in prayer to the Savior, who appears within a cloud segment, against the background of the wooden Verkola Monastery on the bank of the Pinega River. Nearby or in the distance are a ploughed field, a horse harnessed to a harrow, and the body of the youth lying on the ground; in the clouds, the blessing Savior is shown, to whom the Guardian Angel presents the soul of the righteous one.

Other variants of icons of Artemy also exist, including depictions of the youth together with other saints. For example, one of the earliest known representations of Artemy of Verkola — wearing a short white chiton and himation — survives on a 1620s icon by a Stroganov master, portraying Basil the Blessed and Artemy of Verkola praying to Christ Emmanuel. Joint icons of Artemy with Saint Nicholas, Saint Varus, and John the Baptist are also known. He is likewise depicted as part of the Assembly of the Novgorod Saints and the Assembly of the Karelian Saints.

Early icons of Saint Artemy are of interest from the perspective of northern Russian ethnography and for the reconstruction of the historical appearance of the Verkola Monastery.

== Modern assessments ==
Georgy Fedotov noted that death by lightning admits different religious interpretations: it may be viewed either as an unnatural death without repentance, not in accordance with Christian canon, or as death by the will of God. Under the influence of such doubts, Artemy was not buried in a cemetery. However, divine judgment ultimately affirmed his sanctity, and “Artemy appears as a pure sacrifice pleasing to God, approaching the rank of the holy passion-bearers”.

Lev Dmitriev observed that during his lifetime Artemy of Verkola “distinguished himself by no feats of either ecclesiastical or civic significance”. Nevertheless, his fate is of considerable interest as an example of a type of northern Russian hagiography “in which the saint is not a religious ascetic, but a man from among the people, a ‘folk saint,’ who aroused sympathy through his tragic destiny”. At the same time, Dmitriev suggested that the cult of the youthful saint reflects a veneration of the remains of one killed by natural forces rooted in pre-Christian beliefs, subsequently adapted by the official Church to Christian worship.

Some researchers point to similarities between the veneration of Artemy of Verkola and that of Jacob and John of Menyuzha—other youthful righteous figures included in the Assembly of the Novgorod Saints—who perished under unusual circumstances and were glorified after death.

== Literature ==
- Дмитриев, Лев (1973). Житийные повести русского Севера как памятники литературы XIII–XVII веков. Эволюция жанра легендарно-биографических сказаний (6850 экз ed.). Ленинград: Наука. pp. 249–261.
- Рыжова, Елена (2003). "Севернорусская агиография в контексте традиционной народной культуры ("Почему убитые громом – святые")". Локальные традиции в народной культуре Русского севера (Материалы IV научной конференции «Рябининские чтения-2003) (сборник) (in Russian). 4 (2 (10)). Петрозаводск: 22–26.
- Romanenko, Ye. V.; Salnikov, A. K. (2001). "Артемий Веркольский". Православная энциклопедия — Т. III: Анфимий — Афанасий. Moskva: Православная энциклопедия. pp. 463–465. ISBN 5-89572-008-0.
- Савельева Н. В. (2010). Сказания XVII века о святых и подвижниках Русского Севера: Пинега и Мезень. Древнерусские сказания о достопамятных людях, местах и событиях. СПб.: Издательство Олега Абышко. ISBN 978-5-903525-41-6 – via Отв. ред. серии Г. М. Прохоров.
