= June 23 (Eastern Orthodox liturgics) =

Day in the Eastern Orthodox liturgical calendar

Eastern Orthodox liturgical calendar
June 22	June 23	June 24
June 23 O.S. ≍ July 6 N.S. June 23 N.S ≍ June 10 O.S.

An Eastern Orthodox cross

June 23 in Eastern Orthodox liturgical calendars is a feast day and a day of commemoration of saints and martyrs. Although some Orthodox churches use the Revised Julian Calendar and others use the traditional Julian calendar, the fixed commemorations for their respective June 23 are broadly the same, no matter which calendar is used. (Note: Despite the dates being the same, the days to which they refer typically differ by 13 days. The notation Old Style or O.S. is sometimes used to indicate a date in the traditional Julian Calendar (the "Old Calendar"). The notation New Style or N.S. indicates a date in the Revised Julian calendar (the "New Calendar").)

== Saints ==
- Martyr Agrippina of Rome and her companions Paula, Bassa, and Agathonica (253-259) (Note: "A virgin-martyr in Rome, probably under Valerian. She was especially venerated by Sicilians and Greeks, both having relics, the former in Mineo and the latter in Constantinople.") (Note: "Also, at Borne, St. Agrippina, virgin and martyr, under the emperor Valerian. Her body was carried to Sicily, where it works many miracles.") (Note: "This blessed martyr was a virgin at Rome, who, for the faith of Christ, was stripped by the inhuman magistrate and scourged to death. Her body was carried to Sicily, and thence to Constantinople.")
- Hieromartyrs Aristocleus the Priest, Demetrian the Deacon, and Athanasius the Reader, at Salamis on Cyprus (302 or 306) (see also: June 20)
- Martyrs Eustochius, Gaius, Proba, Lollia, and Urban, of Ancyra (4th century)
- Venerable Hesychios the Sinaite, hegumen of Saint Catherine's Monastery (7th century)
- Venerable Barbaros the Myrrhgusher, "the Pentapolitis" (c. 820-829) (Note: This local saint is listed in hagiology of the Metropolis of Aetolia and Acarnania, in Greece, as "Venerable Barbaros the Pentapolitis", on June 23rd.) (see also: May 15 )

== Pre-Schism Western saints ==
- Saint Felix of Sutri, a priest of Sutri in Lazio in Italy, scourged to death under Valerian and Gallienus (257) (Note: "At Sutri, in Tuscany, St. Felix, priest. By the command of the prefect Turcius, he was struck on the mouth with a stone until he breathed his last.")
- Saint John, a priest in Rome, beheaded under Julian the Apostate (362) (Note: "At Rome, in the reign of Julian the Apostate, St. John, a priest, who was decapitated on the old Salarian road, before an idol of the sun. His body was buried near those of other martyrs by the blessed priest Concordius.")
- Saint Moeliai (Moelray), born in Ireland and baptised by St Patrick, he became Abbot of Nendrum Monastery (c. 493)
- Venerable Etheldreda (Audrey, Etheldred, Æthelthryth), Queen and Abbess, foundress of Ely Monastery, England (679) (Note: Born in Suffolk in England, she was a daughter of King Anna of East Anglia and a sister of Sts Saxburgh, Ethelburgh and Withburgh. Twice married, she remained a virgin. She became a nun at Coldingham and then went to Ely where she became abbess. She lived a life of great holiness and simplicity. Her body remained incorrupt after death and her hand-relic survives in Ely to this day.) (Note: "In England, St. Audry, queen and virgin, who departed for heaven with a great renown for sanctity and miracles. Her body was found without corruption eleven years afterwards.") (see also: October 17 - Translation of Relics )
- Saint Hidulf, Count of Hainault in Belgium, he became a monk at Lobbes Abbey which he had helped to found, Benedictine abbot (c. 707) (Note: Count of Hainault in Belgium, he married St Aye, but by mutual consent they entered monasteries. Hidulf became a monk at Lobbes which he had helped to found.) (Note: "In the Scottish Menology of Thomas Dempster, there is an entry of St. Hildulph, Bishop of Treves, and of his companions, as named, at the 23rd of June. The Bollandists also notice this commemoration, but defer giving his Acts to the 11th of July. We are told by Surius, that when Dagobert ruled over the kingdom of the Franks, St. Florentius with the Blessed Argobast, Theodatus, and Hildulph came from Scotia to Alsace. Thomas Dempster has some other notices in his Scottish History.")
- Saint Jacob of Toul, Bishop of Toul (769) (Note: Probably born in Bertigny in Haute Marne, he became a monk at Hornbach, before he became Bishop of Toul in the east of France in 756. See: (in French) Jacob de Toul. Wikipédia. (French Wikipedia).)
- Saint Walhere, a priest in Belgium murdered for his righteousness and venerated as a martyr.

== Post-Schism Orthodox saints ==
- Saint Nicetas of Thebes in Boetia, and his disciples Theodore, Gregory, and Daniel (1079)
- Saint Dionysius of Polotsk (1182) (Note: See: (in Russian) Дионисий Полоцкий. Википедии. (Russian Wikipedia).)
- Saint Artemius of Verkola (1545)
- Venerables Joseph, founder (1612), Anthony, and Ioannicius, Abbots of Zaonikiev Monastery, Vologda (17th century)

=== New martyrs and confessors ===
- New Hieromartyr Kallinikos of Veroia (1821)
- New Hieromartyrs and martyrs of Crete (1821): (Note: "The enraged turks massacred the metropolite of Crete, Gerasimos Pardalis, and five more bishops: Neofitos of Knossos, Joachim of Herronissos, Ierotheos of Lambis, Zacharias of Sitia and Kallinikos, the titular bishop of Diopolis." See: Great Massacre of Heraklion. Wikipedia.) (Note: On June 23, 1821, a Holy Synod took place at the Metropolis of Crete, at the Agios Minas Cathedral, at which the Archbishop of Crete started to read a letter sent by the Ottoman Vizier. Enemies who were lying in wait seized upon the church and murdered the Bishops, 17 priests and 5 hagiorite fathers from the Vatopedi monastery. They also murdered 300 Christians who were in attendance. From there, they persecuted the remaining Christians who were dispersed in the city, mercilessly killing any they found in the streets, where they also met Bishop Hierotheos of Lambis, who they murdered together with his deacon. On the next day, in the village "Epano Phourni", which was the seat of the Bishop of Petra, Bishop Ioakeim was shot outside the Church of the Theotokos.)

- Gerasimos of Crete;
- Neophytos of Knossos;
- Ioakeim of Hersonissos;
- Hierotheos of Lambis;
- Zacharias of Sitia;
- Ioakeim of Petra;
- Gerasimos of Rethymnos;
- Kallinikos of Kydonia;
- Melchisedek of Kissamos;
- Kallinikos of Diapolis;
- and those with them, clerics and laymen, in 1821 and 1822. (Note: A service (in Greek) to the New Hieormartyrs of Crete is available via the website of the Ecumenical Patriarchate's Holy Metropolis of Petra and Hersonissos: (in Greek) Ακολουθία Αγίων Ενδόξων Νεομαρτύρων. Ecumenical Patriarchate - Holy Metropolis of Petra and Hersonissos. Retrieved: 2 May 2018. 9 pages. (PDF).)

- New Hieromartyrs Alexander Miropolsky, Alexis Vvedensky, and Peter Smorodintsev, Priests (1918)
- New Hieromartyr Mitrophan (Krasnopolsky), Archbishop of Astrakhan (1919) (Note: See: (in Russian) Митрофан (Краснопольский). Википедии. (Russian Wikipedia).)
- New Hieromartyr Leontius (von Vimpfen), Bishop of Enotaeva, and those with him (1919)
- New Hieromartyr Maxim (Zhizhilenko), Bishop of Serpukhov (1931) (Note: See: (in Russian) Максим (Жижиленко). Википедии. (Russian Wikipedia).)

== Other commemorations ==
- Synaxis of the Saints of Vladimir (1982)
- Meeting of the Vladimir Icon of the Most Holy Theotokos (1480) (see also: May 21 )
- Icons of the Most Holy Theotokos:

- "Umileniye" ("Of Tender Feeling") of the Pskov-Caves Monastery (1524);
- "Zaonikiev" (1588)
- "Vratarnitsa"(1894)

- Translation of the relics of Venerable Michael of Klopsk, Fool-for-Christ of Klopsk Monastery, Novgorod (1482)
- Second translation of the relics (1714) of St. Herman, Archbishop of Kazan (1567)
- Repose of Schemamonk Zosimas of Solovki (1855)
- Repose of Ivan M. Kontzevitch, spiritual writer (1965) (Note: See: (in Russian) Концевич, Иван Михайлович. Википедии. (Russian Wikipedia).)

== Icon gallery ==
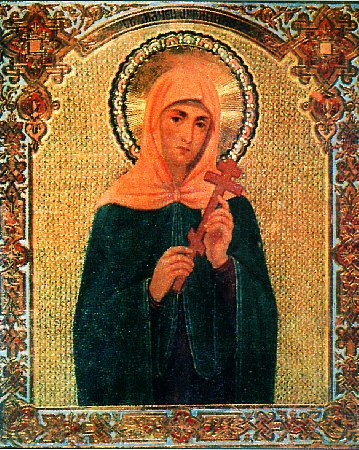
Martyr Agrippina of Rome.

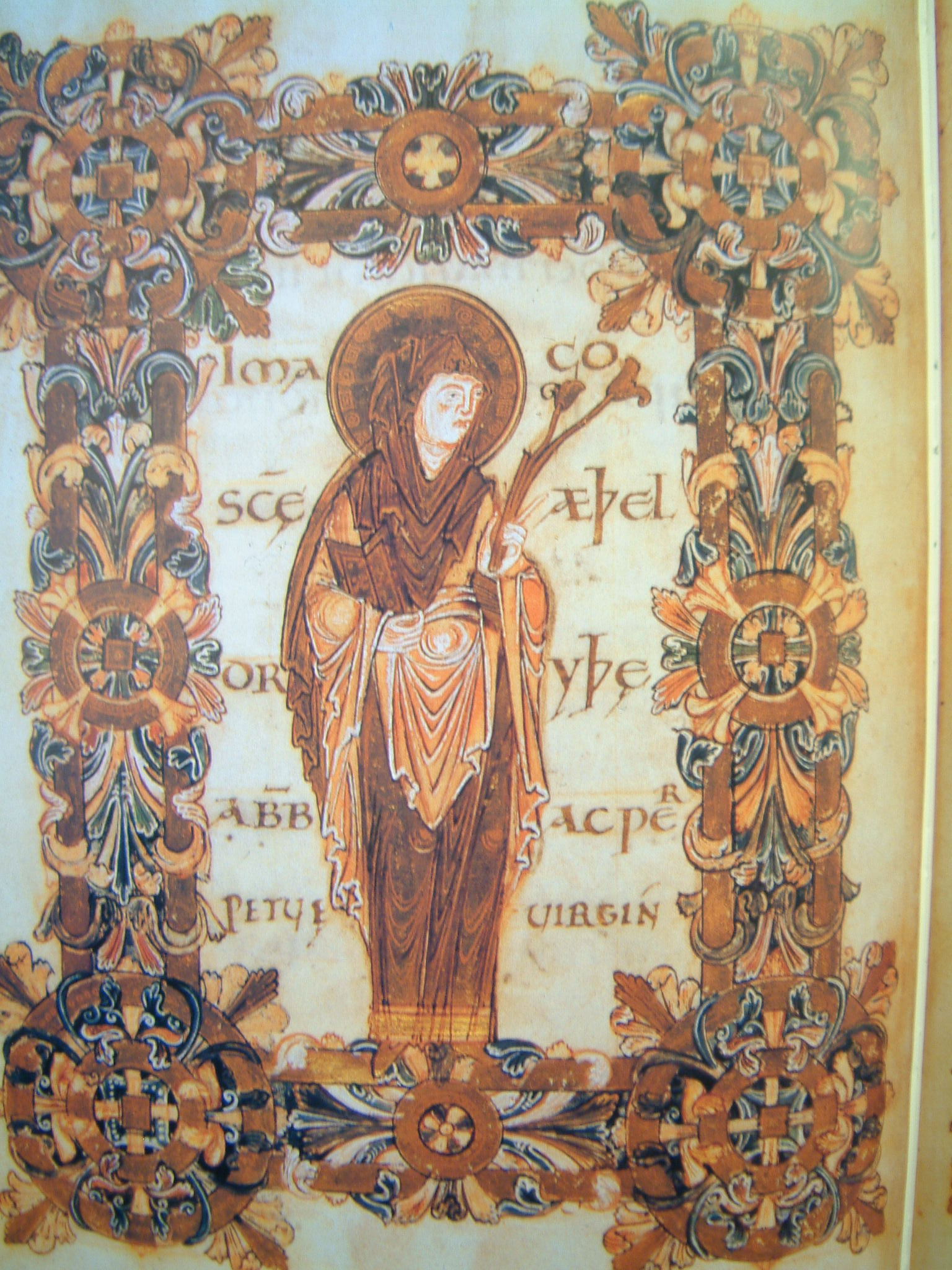
Venerable Etheldreda (Audrey, Æthelthryth), Queen and Abbess.

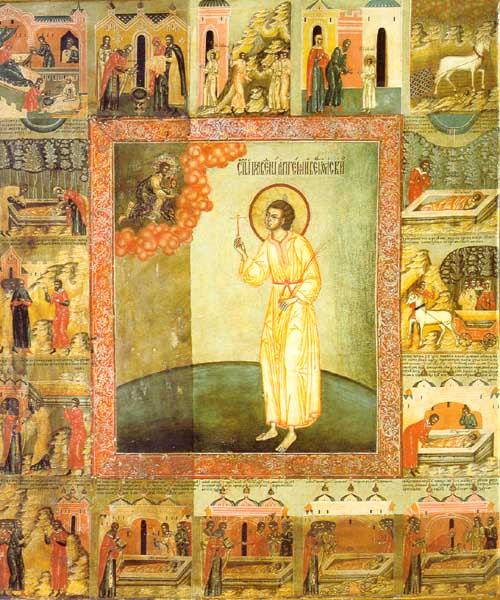
St. Artemius of Verkola.

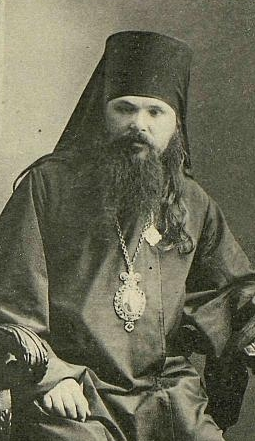
New Hieromartyr Mitrophan (Krasnopolsky), Archbishop of Astrakhan.

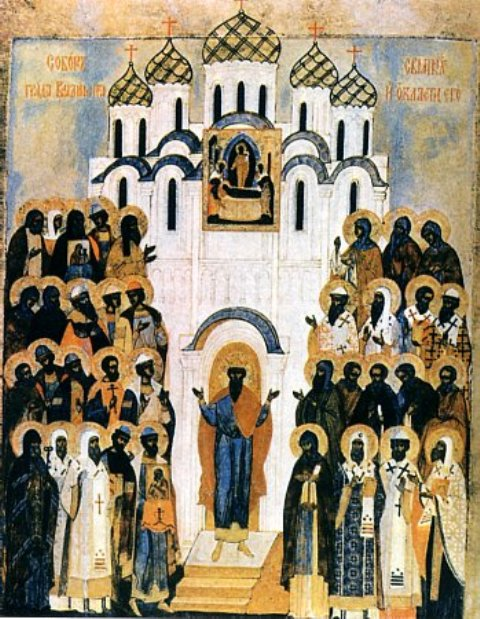
Synaxis of the Saints of Vladimir.

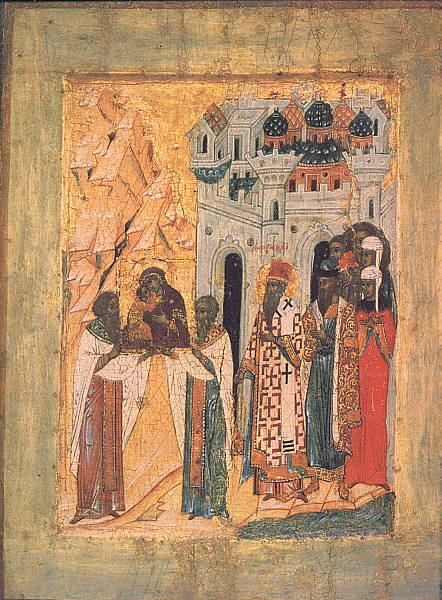
Meeting of the Vladimir Icon of the Most Holy Theotokos.

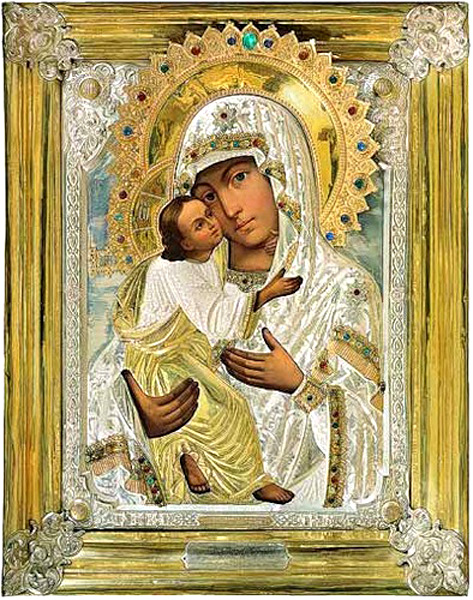
Icons of the Most Holy Theotokos Umileniye" ("Of Tender Feeling") of the Pskov-Caves Monastery.

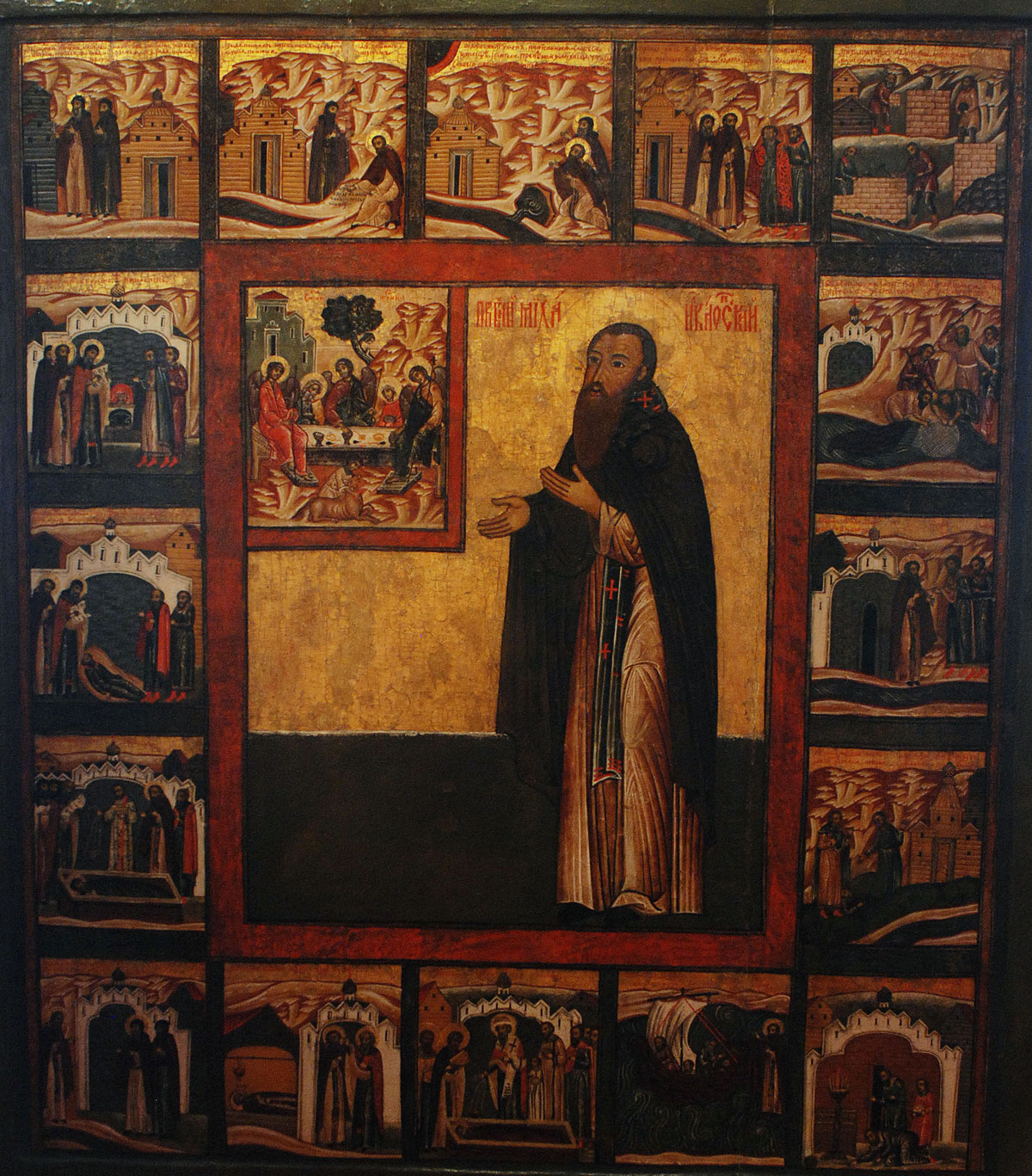
Venerable Michael of Klopsk.

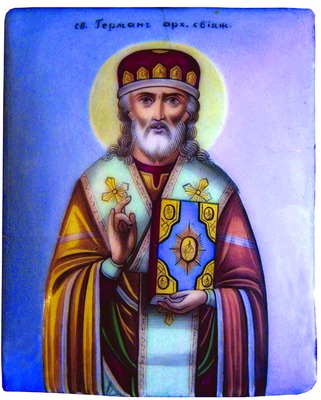
St. Herman, Archbishop of Kazan.

== Sources ==
- June 23/July 6. Orthodox Calendar (PRAVOSLAVIE.RU).
- July 6 / June 23. HOLY TRINITY RUSSIAN ORTHODOX CHURCH (A parish of the Patriarchate of Moscow).
- June 23. OCA - The Lives of the Saints.
- The Autonomous Orthodox Metropolia of Western Europe and the Americas (ROCOR). St. Hilarion Calendar of Saints for the year of our Lord 2004. St. Hilarion Press (Austin, TX). p. 46.
- The Twenty-Third Day of the Month of June. Orthodoxy in China.
- June 23. Latin Saints of the Orthodox Patriarchate of Rome.
- The Roman Martyrology. Transl. by the Archbishop of Baltimore. Last Edition, According to the Copy Printed at Rome in 1914. Revised Edition, with the Imprimatur of His Eminence Cardinal Gibbons. Baltimore: John Murphy Company, 1916. pp. 182–183.
- Rev. Richard Stanton. A Menology of England and Wales, or, Brief Memorials of the Ancient British and English Saints Arranged According to the Calendar, Together with the Martyrs of the 16th and 17th Centuries. London: Burns & Oates, 1892. pp. 285–287.

Greek Sources

- Great Synaxaristes: (in Greek) 23 ΙΟΥΝΙΟΥ. ΜΕΓΑΣ ΣΥΝΑΞΑΡΙΣΤΗΣ.
- (in Greek) Συναξαριστής. 23 Ιουνίου. ECCLESIA.GR. (H ΕΚΚΛΗΣΙΑ ΤΗΣ ΕΛΛΑΔΟΣ).
- (in Greek) 23 Ιουνίου. Αποστολική Διακονία της Εκκλησίας της Ελλάδος (Apostoliki Diakonia of the Church of Greece).
- (in Greek) 23/06/2018. Ορθόδοξος Συναξαριστής.

Russian Sources

- (in Russian) 6 июля (23 июня). Православная Энциклопедия под редакцией Патриарха Московского и всея Руси Кирилла (электронная версия). (Orthodox Encyclopedia - Pravenc.ru).
- (in Russian) 23 июня по старому стилю / 6 июля по новому стилю. Русская Православная Церковь - Православный церковный календарь на 2017 год.
- (in Russian) 23 июня (ст.ст.) 6 июля 2014 (нов. ст.). Русская Православная Церковь Отдел внешних церковных связей. (DECR).
