= Pachikha =

Pachikha Пачиха
- Settlement
- Location within Arkhangelsk Oblast Location within Russia
- Coordinates: 63°37′N 44°23′E
- Country: Russia
- Region: Arkhangelsk Oblast
- District: Pinezhsky District
- Time zone: UTC+3:00

Pachikha (Russian: Пачиха) is a rural locality (a settlement) in Kushkopalskoye Rural Settlement of Pinezhsky District, Arkhangelsk Oblast, Russia. The population was 202 as of 2010. There are 6 streets.

== Geography ==
Pachikha is located on the Yula River, 69 km south of Karpogory (the district's administrative centre) by road. Kushkopala is the nearest rural locality.
