= Mariya Krivopolenova =

Russian folklore performer and storyteller

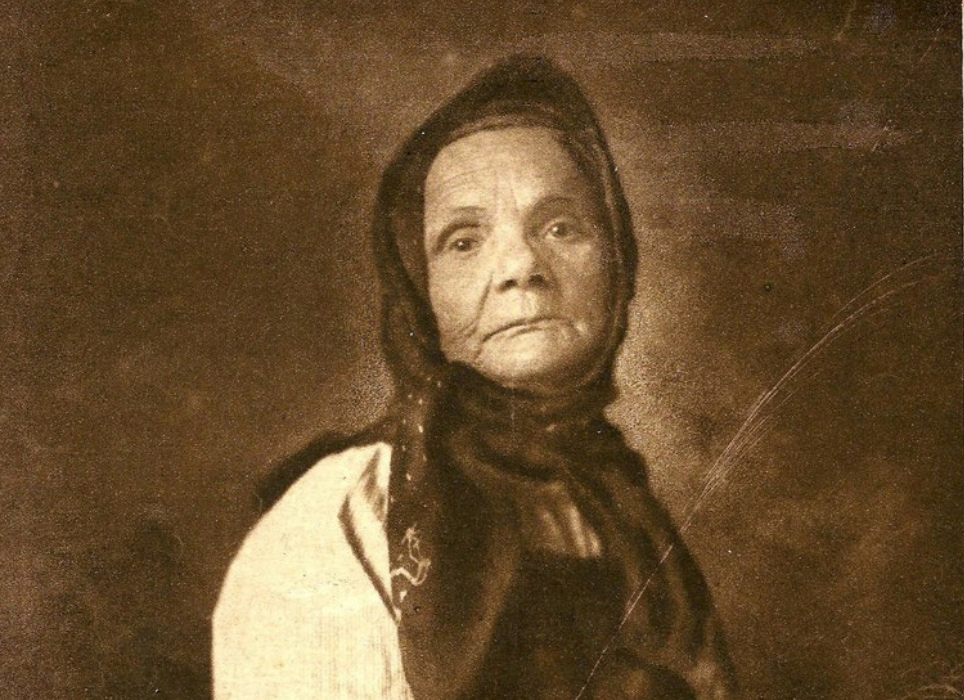
Mariya Krivopolenova

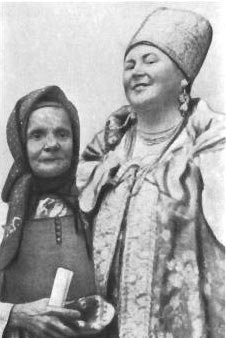
Mariya Krivopolenova (left) and Olga Ozarovskaya (right), 1915

Mariya Dmitriyevna Krivopolenova (Russian: Мария Дмитриевна Кривополенова; née Mariya Kabalina; born 1843 —1924) was a Russian folklore performer and a storyteller.

== Biography ==
Mariya Krivopolenova was born as Mariya Kabalina on March 31 [O.S. March 19], 1843 in Ust-Yezhuga, Pinezhsky Uyezd, Arkhangelsk Governorate, Russia Empire in a peasant family on the Pinega River in the Northern Russia. In 1867, she got married and moved to the village of Shotogorka, also on the bank of the Pinega. She practiced storytelling, which she learned from her family, and when an interest to the northern Russian folklore increased, and folklore collectors started to travel to Arkhangelsk area in 1890s, she was noticed for her performance skills. First, Alexander Dmitriyevich Grigoryev, who travelled over the Pinega, met her and included some of the songs she performed in the collection of the Pinega folklore he published in 1902. Apparently, she was living in a very poor family and was begging almost all of her life, until in the end of her life she could earn enough money by storytelling.

In 1915, Olga Ozarovskaya, a folklore performer had travelled to Arkhangelsk Governorate to collect songs and stories, she met Krivopolenova whom she took along with her to Moscow. Ozarovskaya also worked with Krivopolenova to transcribe and publish her work. Krivopolenova performed in Moscow, and then in Arkhangelsk with the great success, she had her portrait done by the best artists (for instance, there is a wooden sculpture of Sergey Konyonkov). When she returned to the Pinega she was basically forgotten. She travelled again to Moscow in 1921, invited by Anatoly Lunacharsky, gave a number of concerts.

She died on February 2, 1924, at the age of 80, in Veyegora, Pinezhsky Uyezd, Arkhangelsk Governorate, Soviet Union. Songs, fairy tales, and bylinas performed by Mariya Krivopolenova are now the standard examples of Northern Russia folklore.

== Publications ==
- Ozarovskaya, Olga Erastovna; Krivopolenova, M.D (1916). Бабушкины старины [A Grandmothers Past] (in Russian). Издательство Огни.
