= Aynova =

Aynova Айнова
- Village
- Location within Arkhangelsk Oblast Location within Russia
- Coordinates: 63°57′N 44°33′E
- Country: Russia
- Region: Arkhangelsk Oblast
- District: Pinezhsky District
- Time zone: UTC+3:00

Aynova (Russian: Айнова) is a rural locality (a village) in Karkogorskoye Rural Settlement of Pinezhsky District, Arkhangelsk Oblast, Russia. The population was 77 as of 2010. There are 4 streets.

== Geography ==
Aynova is located on the Pinega River, 8 km southeast of Karpogory (the district's administrative centre) by road. Kevrola is the nearest rural locality.
