= Kuloy, Pinezhsky District, Arkhangelsk Oblast =

Kuloy Кулой
- Village
- Location within Arkhangelsk Oblast Location within Russia
- Coordinates: 64°58′N 43°30′E
- Country: Russia
- Region: Arkhangelsk Oblast
- District: Pinezhsky District
- Time zone: UTC+3:00

Kuloy (Russian: Кулой) is a rural locality (a village) in Pinezhskoye Rural Settlement of Pinezhsky District, Arkhangelsk Oblast, Russia. The population was 14 in 2010.

== Geography ==
Kuloy is located on the Kuloy River, 166 km north of Karpogory (the district's administrative centre) by road. Krasny Bor is the nearest rural locality.
