= Valdokurye =

Valdokurye Валдокурье
- Village
- Location within Arkhangelsk Oblast Location within Russia
- Coordinates: 64°37′N 43°23′E
- Country: Russia
- Region: Arkhangelsk Oblast
- District: Pinezhsky District
- Time zone: UTC+3:00

Valdokurye (Russian: Валдокурье) is a rural locality (a village) in Pinezhskoye Rural Settlement of Pinezhsky District, Arkhangelsk Oblast, Russia. The population was 41 as of 2010.

== Geography ==
Valdokurye is located on the Pinega River, 148 km northwest of Karpogory (the district's administrative centre) by road. Maletino is the nearest rural locality.
