= Chakola, Arkhangelsk Oblast =

Chakola Чакола
- Village
- Location within Arkhangelsk Oblast Location within Russia
- Coordinates: 64°18′N 44°19′E
- Country: Russia
- Region: Arkhangelsk Oblast
- District: Pinezhsky District
- Time zone: UTC+3:00

Chakola (Russian: Чакола) is a rural locality (a village) in Pirinemskoye Rural Settlement of Pinezhsky District, Arkhangelsk Oblast, Russia. The population was 98 as of 2010. There are 2 streets.

== Geography ==
Chakola is located on the Pinega River, 55 km north of Karpogory (the district's administrative centre) by road. Gorodok is the nearest rural locality.
