= Sosnovka, Pinezhsky District, Arkhangelsk Oblast =

Sosnovka Сосновка
- Settlement
- Location within Arkhangelsk Oblast Location within Russia
- Coordinates: 63°25′N 46°08′E
- Country: Russia
- Region: Arkhangelsk Oblast
- District: Pinezhsky District
- Time zone: UTC+3:00

Sosnovka (Russian: Сосновка) is a rural locality (a settlement) in Pinezhsky District, Arkhangelsk Oblast, Russia. The population was 1,091 as of 2012. There are 12 streets.

== Geography ==
Sosnovka is located 128 km southeast of Karpogory (the district's administrative centre) by road. Mamonikha is the nearest rural locality.

== History ==
The arrest of Polish citizens by the Red Army took place on February 10, 1940, following the joint invasion by Germany (on September 1, 1939) and the Soviet Union (on September 17, 1939), which was agreed upon between Hitler and Stalin as part of the Ribbentrop-Molotov Pact. Between February 1940 and the second half of 1941, a camp was located in the village for Polish people who had been forcibly deported in cattle cars with their entire families to Siberia, including to this particular location. At least two-thirds of these people did not survive this period. Most of the victims were children, the elderly, or mothers with small children, as they were unable to work and did not receive any additional food, which was already insufficient. Those who survived were mostly released in the second half of 1942 (following the 1941 Majski-Sikorski Agreement) and had to fend for themselves. Many of them settled in Kazakhstan and Kyrgyzstan. Many men joined the Polish army within the ranks of the Red Army or the Polish Anders Army. Poles worked in the village of Sosnowka, felling trees, and some also worked at a sawmill. The logging took place about 10 kilometers from the living quarters. They set out at 5 a.m. and returned in the evening, working 7 days a week. They lived in barracks, with dozens of people in one.

Soviet repressions of Polish citizens (1939–1946)

https://pl.wikisource.org/wiki/Uk%C5%82ad_pomi%C4%99dzy_Rzecz%C4%85pospolit%C4%85_Polsk%C4%85_a_ZSRR_z_30_lipca_1941_%28uk%C5%82ad_Sikorski-Majski%29

https://zbioryspoleczne.pl/dokumenty/PL_1071_01_05_4151_01
