= Yula (river) =

Yula Russian: Юла

Location
- Country: Russia

Physical characteristics
- Mouth: Pinega
  - coordinates: 63°48′45″N 44°44′30″E
- Length: 314 km (195 mi)
- Basin size: 5,290 km^{2} (2,040 mi^{2})
- Discharge
  - average: 46.7 m^{3}/s (1,650 cu ft/s)

Basin features
- Progression: Pinega→ Northern Dvina→ White Sea

The Northern Dvina basin (also shows the Yula)

The Yula (Russian: Юла) is a river in Vinogradovsky and Pinezhsky Districts of Arkhangelsk Oblast in Russia. It is a left tributary of the Pinega. It is 314 kilometres (195 mi) long, and the area of its basin 5,290 square kilometres (2,040 sq mi). The principal tributaries of the Yula are Shivrey (right), Syomras (right), Ura (right), Yongala (left), and Yuras (left).

The river basin of the Yula includes the whole eastern part of Vinogradovsky District, a big part of Pinezhsky District, and minor areas in the north-west of Verkhnetoyemsky District.

The source of the Yula is in the south-eastern part of Vinogradovsky District, close to the border with Verkhnetoyemsky District. The Yula initially flows north and enters Pinezhsky District. The only village on the Yula, the village of Pachikha, is located downstream from the confluence of the Yula with its right tributary, Pachikha. Below the Yula turns north-east. The mouth of the Yula is located south of the village of Kushkopala.
