= Novolavela =

Novolavela Новолавела
- Settlement
- Location within Arkhangelsk Oblast Location within Russia
- Coordinates: 63°36′N 45°31′E
- Country: Russia
- Region: Arkhangelsk Oblast
- District: Pinezhsky District
- Time zone: UTC+3:00

Novolavela (Russian: Новолавела) is a rural locality (a settlement) and the administrative center of Lavelskoye Rural Settlement of Pinezhsky District, Arkhangelsk Oblast, Russia. The population was 1,024 as of 2010. There are 19 streets.

== Geography ==
Novolavela is located 83 km southeast of Karpogory (the district's administrative centre) by road. Zayedovye is the nearest rural locality.
