= Yasny, Arkhangelsk Oblast =

Yasny Ясный
- Settlement
- Location within Arkhangelsk Oblast Location within Russia
- Coordinates: 64°02′N 44°05′E
- Country: Russia
- Region: Arkhangelsk Oblast
- District: Pinezhsky District
- Time zone: UTC+3:00

Yasny (Russian: Ясный) is a rural locality (a settlement) and the administrative center of Shilegskoye Rural Settlement of Pinezhsky District, Arkhangelsk Oblast, Russia. The population was 1,299 as of 2010. There are 17 streets.

== Geography ==
Yasny is located on the Pinega River, 20 km west of Karpogory (the district's administrative centre) by road. Shilega is the nearest rural locality.
