= Sogra =

Sogra (Russian: Согра) is the name of several rural localities in Russia:

- Sogra, Kotlassky District, Arkhangelsk Oblast, a village in Votlazhemsky Selsoviet of Kotlassky District in Arkhangelsk Oblast; 61°06′N 46°38′E
- Sogra, Verkhnetoyemsky District, Arkhangelsk Oblast, a village in Gorkovsky Selsoviet of Verkhnetoyemsky District in Arkhangelsk Oblast; 62°41′N 46°12′E
- Sogra, Kostroma Oblast, a selo in Belkovskoye Settlement of Vokhomsky District in Kostroma Oblast; 58°59′N 46°32′E
- Sogra, Omsk Oblast, a village in Serebryansky Rural Okrug of Gorkovsky District in Omsk Oblast; 55°43′N 74°15′E
