= Siya, Arkhangelsk Oblast =

Siya Сия
- Settlement
- Location within Arkhangelsk Oblast Location within Russia
- Coordinates: 64°01′N 43°10′E
- Country: Russia
- Region: Arkhangelsk Oblast
- District: Pinezhsky District
- Time zone: UTC+3:00

Siya (Russian: Сия) is a rural locality (a settlement) and the administrative center of Siyskoye Rural Settlement of Pinezhsky District, Arkhangelsk Oblast, Russia. The population was 1,336 as of 2010. There are 6 streets.

== Geography ==
Siya is located 94 km (58 mi) west of Karpogory (the district's administrative centre) by road. Syloga is the nearest rural locality.
