= Pinega Nature Reserve =

Strict nature reserve in Arkhangelsk Oblast, Russia

Pinezhsky Nature Reserve
- IUCN category Ia (strict nature reserve)
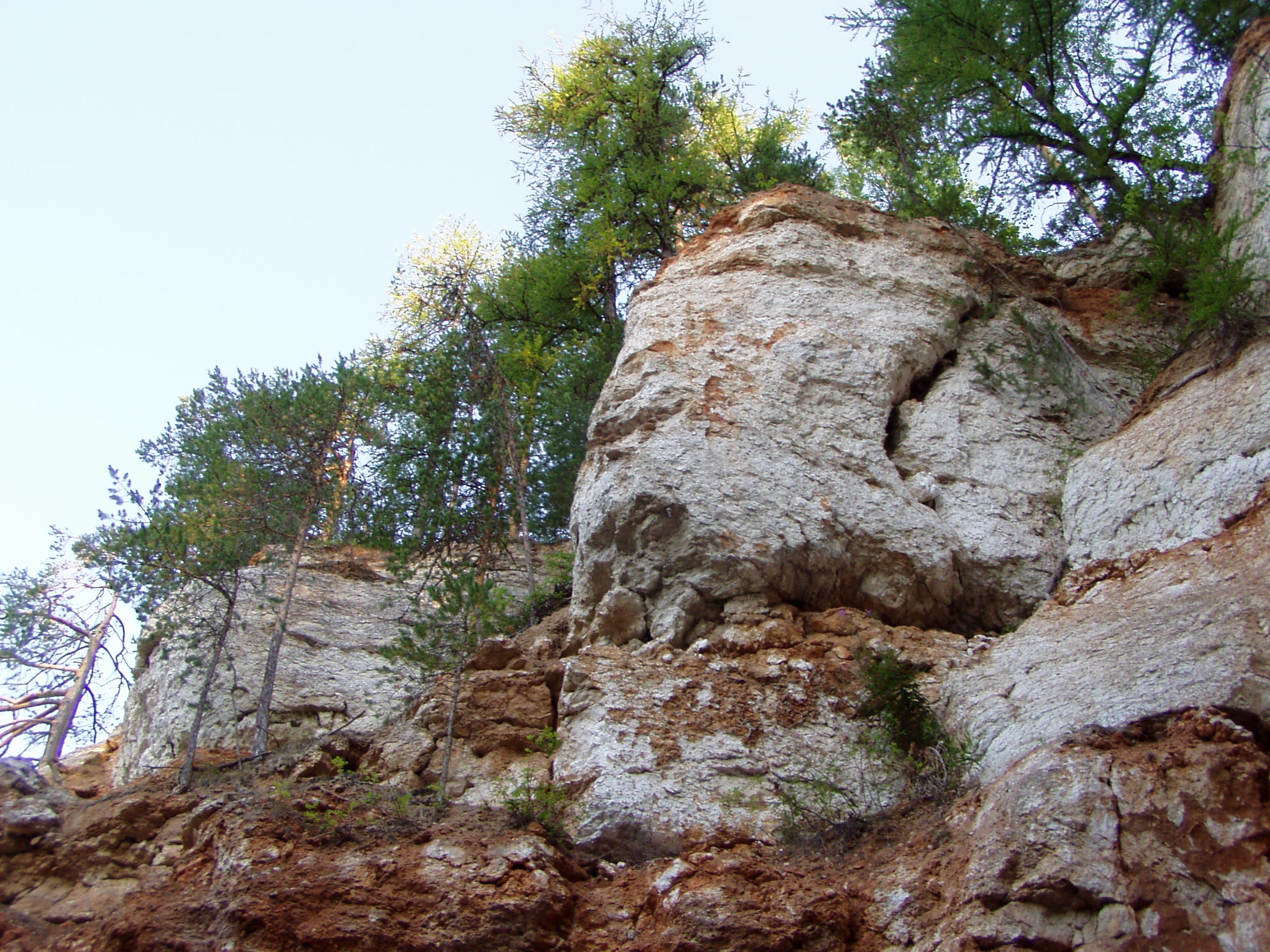
- Golubino cave, Pinezhsky

- Location within Russia
- Location: Russia
- Nearest city: Arkhangelsk
- Coordinates: 64°42′N 43°12′E
- Area: 515.22 km^{2} (198.93 sq mi)
- Established: 1974
- Governing body: Department of hunting of the administration of Arkhangelsk Oblast

Pinega Nature Reserve (Russian: Пинежский заповедник, Pinezhsky Zapovednik) is a nature reserve (a zapovednik) in the north of Russia, located in Pinezhsky District of Arkhangelsk Oblast, about 150 km due east of the city of Arkhangelsk. The reserve is on the right bank of the Pinega River and on both banks of the Sotka River, the source of the Kuloy River. It was established August 20, 1974. The nature reserve is created to protect the karst landscapes and the coniferous forests (taiga) of the Northern Russia.

== Location and geography ==
The area of the nature reserve is elongated from north to south. The south-eastern border runs parallel to the course of the Pinega at the distance of several kilometers from the riverbed, approximately between the villages of Valdokurye and Pelino. The southern part of the nature reserve belongs to the Belaya River, a tributary of the Pinega. The northern part is crossed from the west to the east by the Sotka River.

Pinezhsky Nature Reserve protects three types of landscapes: swampy flatland (in the western part, on the divide between the Kuloy and the Pinega river basins); hilly plateau (which is the south-eastern part of the White Sea - Kuloy Plateau which rises to the east of the Dvina Bay), and the karst landscapes. Whereas the first two are somehow typical for Arkhangelsk Oblast, the karst is unique. There are such distinctive features of the karst as caves (more than 500 in the reserve limits), ravines (some of them up to 5 kilometres (3.1 mi) long), and lakes. There are 83 lakes in the reserve, and most of them are karst lakes. Two of the creeks vanish below the earth, with one of them, the Karyala, reappearing after 5 kilometres (3.1 mi) at the side of a ravine.

== Ecoregion and climate ==
The reserve is in the Scandinavian and Russian taiga ecoregion. Its climate classification is Humid continental climate, cool summer (Köppen climate classification (Dfc)). This climate is characterized by long cold winters, and short, cool summers.

== Flora ==
There are 480 plant species in the reserve, some of which are endemic for North-East of the European Russia. The reserve is mostly covered by forests, which are siberian fir (72.5%), pine (16%), birch (7%) and larch (4.6%). Most of the birch forests occupy the area where the woods previously burnt down or were cut down. Minor areas, mostly in floodplains, are occupied by meadows.

== Fauna ==
The area of the reserve is small, and most of the animals do not reside there permanently but migrate. Among the species that occur in the reserve are moose, brown bear (between 15 and 20), lynx, wolverine, wolf, red fox, badger, beaver, European mink, European otter and others.

== History ==
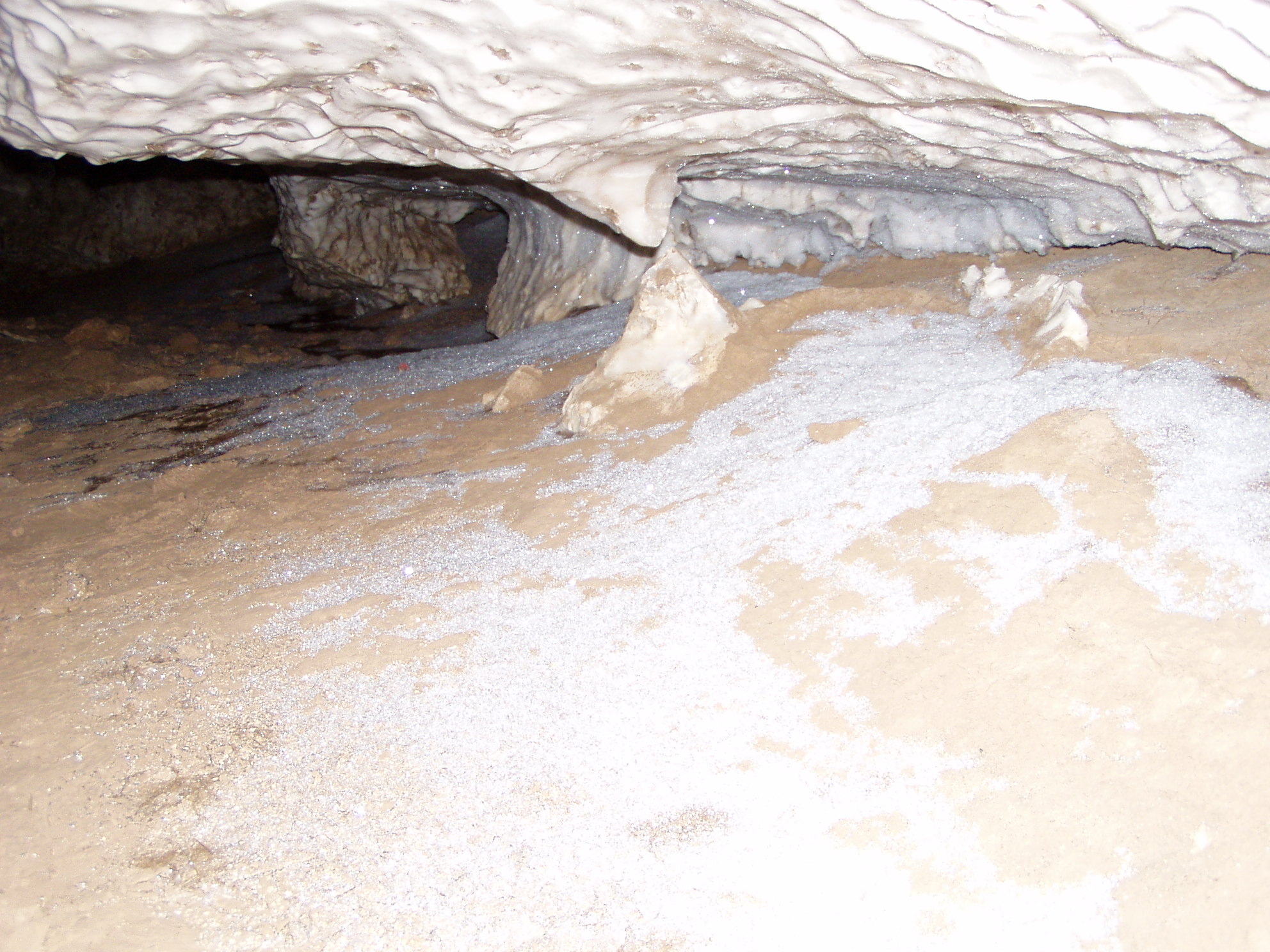
Pinega karst cave

The valley of the Pinega River was populated by Russians since at least the 13th century, and the settlement of Pinega, located close to the current area of the nature reserve, has been known since the 17th century. However, there were no settlements away from the right bank of the Pinega, and the area was not really used for any development.

The creation of the nature reserve was initiated by the biologist Dmitry Saburov (1931–1996) who from 1963 to 1966 investigated the woods which at the time belonged to Pinega and Karpogory forest enterprises. Saburov then suggested to create the nature reserve of the area of 1,720 square kilometres (660 mi^{2}), and the project was supported by academic circles, in the first instance by Saburov's home institution, the Komarov Botanical Institute. However, the project met resistance from the timber industry, and as a compromise, the natural reserve was open in 1974 with the area of 412.44 square kilometres (159.24 mi^{2}). Eventually the area was extended to 515.22 square kilometres (198.93 mi^{2}), the last extension was performed in 1996.

== Recreation and tourism ==
The nature reserve has a relatively remote location, however, it gets a share of tourists visiting the caves.

In 2004, the Karst Museum was open in the reserve.
