= Mezhdurechensky, Arkhangelsk Oblast =

Mezhdurechensky Междуреченский
- Settlement
- Location within Arkhangelsk Oblast Location within Russia
- Coordinates: 64°02′N 44°25′E
- Country: Russia
- Region: Arkhangelsk Oblast
- District: Pinezhsky District
- Time zone: UTC+3:00

Mezhdurechensky (Russian: Междуреченский) is a rural locality (a settlement) in Mezhdurechenskoye Rural Settlement of Pinezhsky District, Arkhangelsk Oblast, Russia. The population was 1,981 as of 2010. There are 12 streets.

== Geography ==
Mezhdurechensky is located 7 km north of Karpogory (the district's administrative centre) by road. Soga is the nearest rural locality.
