= Verkola =

Verkola Веркола (Russian)
- Selo
- Location within Arkhangelsk Oblast Location within Russia
- Coordinates: 63°47′N 45°08′E
- Country: Russia
- Region: Arkhangelsk Oblast
- District: Pinezhsky District
- Time zone: UTC+3:00

Verkola (Russian: Ве́ркола) is a rural locality (a selo) and the administrative center of Verkolskoye Rural Settlement of Pinezhsky District, Arkhangelsk Oblast, Russia. The population was 370 as of 2010. There are 7 streets.

== Geography ==
Verkola is located on the Pinega River, 49 km southeast of Karpogory (the district's administrative centre) by road. Novy Put is the nearest rural locality.
