= Shotogorka =

Shotogorka Шотогорка
- Village
- Location within Arkhangelsk Oblast Location within Russia
- Coordinates: 64°10′N 44°10′E
- Country: Russia
- Region: Arkhangelsk Oblast
- District: Pinezhsky District
- Time zone: UTC+3:00

Shotogorka (Russian: Шотогорка) is a rural locality (a village) in Pirinemskoye Rural Settlement of Pinezhsky District, Arkhangelsk Oblast, Russia. The population was 126 as of 2010. There are 6 streets.

== Geography ==
Shotogorka is located 43 km northwest of Karpogory (the district's administrative centre) by road. Bereznik is the nearest rural locality.
