= Kevrola =

Kevrola Кеврола
- Village
- Location within Arkhangelsk Oblast Location within Russia
- Coordinates: 63°57′N 44°30′E
- Country: Russia
- Region: Arkhangelsk Oblast
- District: Pinezhsky District
- Time zone: UTC+3:00

Kevrola (Russian: Кеврола) is a rural locality (a village) and the administrative center of Kevrolskoye Rural Settlement of Pinezhsky District, Arkhangelsk Oblast, Russia. The population was 447 as of 2010.

== Geography ==
Kevrola is located on the Pinega River, 10 km southeast of Karpogory (the district's administrative centre) by road. Aynova is the nearest rural locality.
