= Yedoma, Pinezhsky District, Arkhangelsk Oblast =

Yedoma Едома
- Village
- Location within Arkhangelsk Oblast Location within Russia
- Coordinates: 63°55′N 44°32′E
- Country: Russia
- Region: Arkhangelsk Oblast
- District: Pinezhsky District
- Time zone: UTC+3:00

Yedoma (Russian: Едома) is a rural locality (a village) in Kevrolskoye Rural Settlement of Pinezhsky District, Arkhangelsk Oblast, Russia. The population was 6 as of 2010.

== Geography ==
Yedoma is located on the Pinega River, 12 km southeast of Karpogory (the district's administrative centre) by road. Kevrola is the nearest rural locality.
