= Mineo =

Mineo Minìu (Sicilian) Mèneon (Greek)
- Comune
- Comune di Mineo
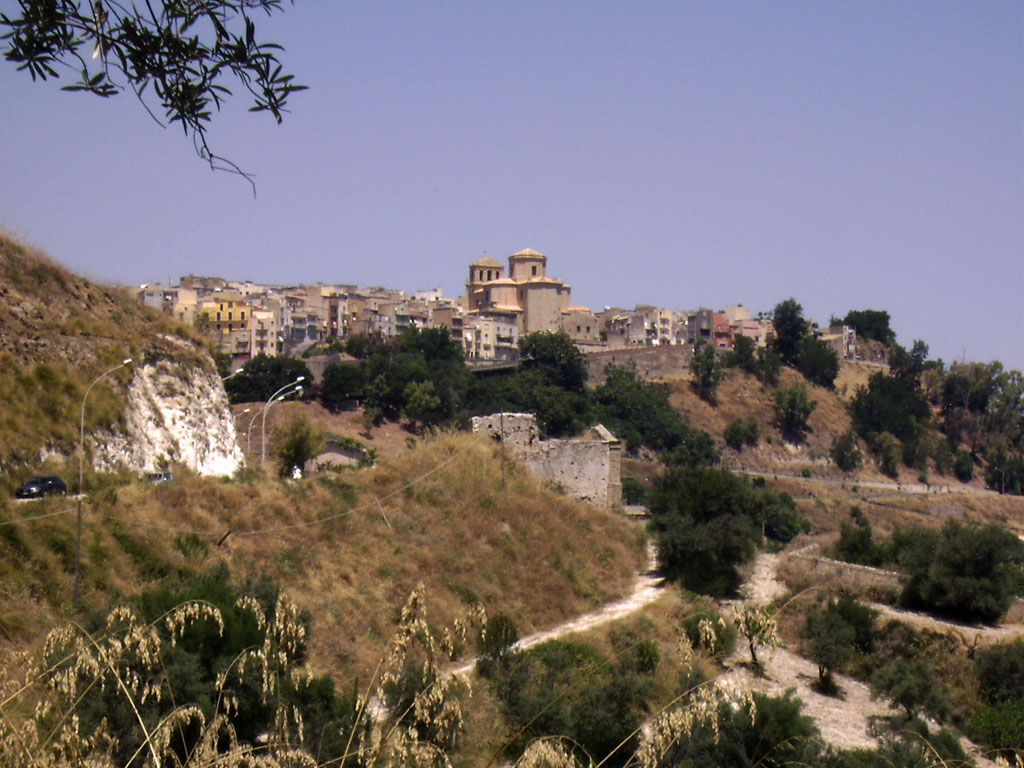
- Panorama of Mineo

- Coat of arms

- Location within Italy Location within Sicily
- Coordinates: 37°16′N 14°41′E
- Country: Italy
- Region: Sicily
- Metropolitan city: Catania (CT)
- Frazioni: Borgo Pietro Lupo

Government
  - Mayor: Anna Aloisi

Area
  - Total: 244 km^{2} (94 sq mi)
- Elevation: 511 m (1,677 ft)

Population (1 January 2015)
  - Total: 5,203
  - Density: 21.3/km^{2} (55.2/sq mi)
- Demonym(s): Italian: menenini Sicilian: minioli
- Time zone: UTC+1 (CET)
  - Summer (DST): UTC+2 (CEST)
- Postal code: 95044
- Dialing code: 0933
- Patron saint: Agrippina of Mineo
- Saint day: last two Sundays in August
- Website: comune.mineo.ct.it

Mineo (Sicilian: Minìu; Ancient Greek: Μέναιον, Μέναινον or Μεναί; Latin: Menaeum, Menaenum or Menae) is a town and comune (municipality) in the Metropolitan City of Catania, part of Sicily, Italy. It lies 64 kilometres (40 mi) southwest of Catania, 56 kilometres (35 mi) from Ragusa, 54 kilometres (34 mi) from Gela, and 22 kilometres (14 mi) from Caltagirone.

Diodorus Siculus states that Ducetius founded Menaenum and distributed the surrounding land among settlers. Later, the city was captured by Dionysius I of Syracuse.

It has approximately 5,600 inhabitants. It serves as the center of the cult of Saint Agrippina of Mineo.

Among the churches in the town are:

- Sant'Agrippina
- Santi Pietro e Paolo
- Santa Maria Maggiore

It is also a site of interest since Luigi Capuana, one of Italy's most famous writers in the 19th and early 20th centuries, hailed from Mineo and was at one time the town's mayor. Mineo now houses a small library and museum dedicated to Capuana.
