= Sant'Agrippina, Mineo =

Church building in Mineo, Italy

Coordinates: 37.26454°N 14.68825°E

Sant'Agrippina
- Chiesa di Sant'Agrippina
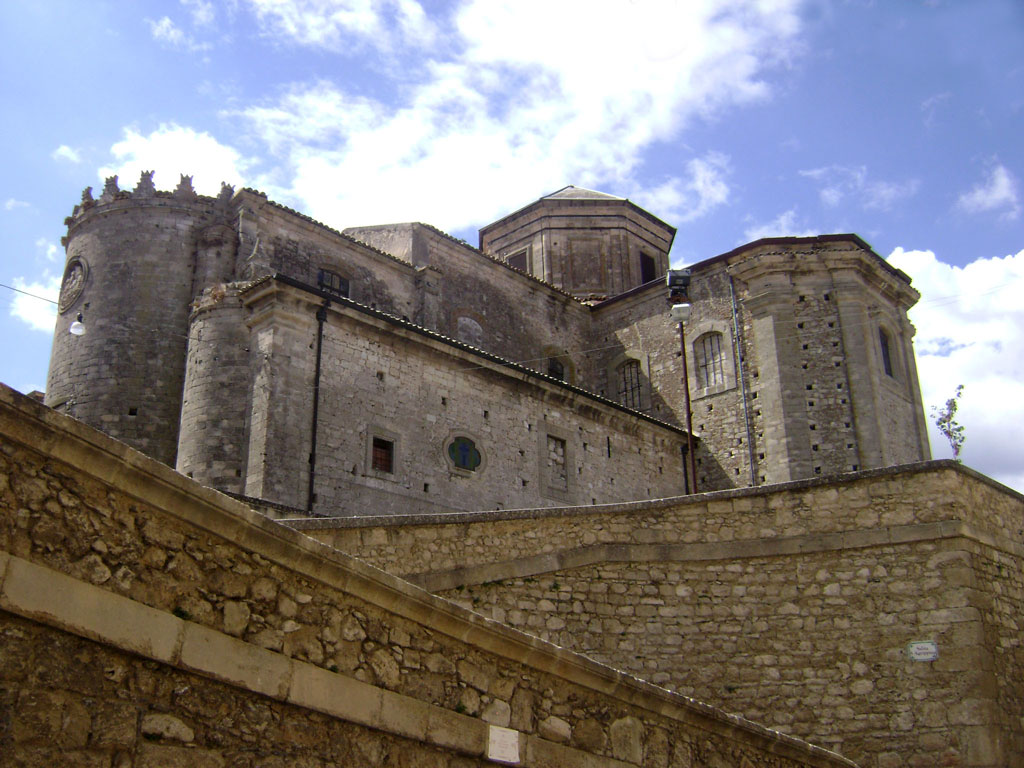

Religion
- Affiliation: Catholicism
- Region: Sicily
- Year consecrated: 312

Location
- Location: Mineo
- Country: Italy
- Interactive map of Sant'Agrippina

Architecture
- Completed: 263

Sant'Agrippina is a Roman Catholic church building in the town of Mineo, province of Catania, Sicily, that dedicated to the town's patron, Saint Agrippina of Mineo, sometimes known as Saint Agrippina.

== History ==
The church is one of three Catholic churches located in Mineo; it tower-like domes are easily visible from afar. Tradition holds that this church shelters the relics of the titular Saint, leading it to become the center for her veneration and for prayers for her miracles.

A church at the site was putatively consecrated in 312 at the site of an ancient oratory founded by St Eupresia in the year 263. Putatively the remains of the virgin and martyr Agrippina, were miraculously brought here from Rome.

During the Muslim occupation of Sicily, this building likely served as a mosque. An earthquake in 1163 damaged the superior structure but the crypt of the church still dates from before this period. The 15th century reconstruction rebuilt the three tall semicircular stone apses with merlionated cornices. The structure is built in the layout of a Greek Cross with a central dome. Much of the church derives from the reconstruction after the 1693 Sicily earthquake. The central nave is flanked by 8 columns on each side and numerous side altars. The stucco decoration of the apse was completed by Giacomo Serpotta, and the frescoes of the cupola were added in the 18th century by Sebastiano Lo Monaco. The church contains a Nativity scene (Presepe) in wood. The baroque portal with a broken tympanum has a 20th-century bronze doors.

The high altar has a bronze candelabrum (1593). In the 16th century, a polychrome wooden statue of Saint Agrippina was placed on a marble pedestal in the chapel on the right side of the church. From the 17th century, in the dome of the church, there are four hexagonal columns that are covered in an embossed silver leaf. Numerous stuccoes depicting scenes from the Old Testament adorn the ceiling, and to the right there is a precious crib made from wood.

== See also ==
- Chapel of Saint Agrippina di Mineo

== Sources ==
- Town of Mineo
- Tourism and tourist places in Mineo: The Church of Sant'Agrippina
- "General information - Catania - Mineo". Archived from the original on 2016-03-03.
