= Santa Maria Maggiore, Mineo =

Church in Sicily, Italy

Coordinates: 37.26706°N 14.69236°E

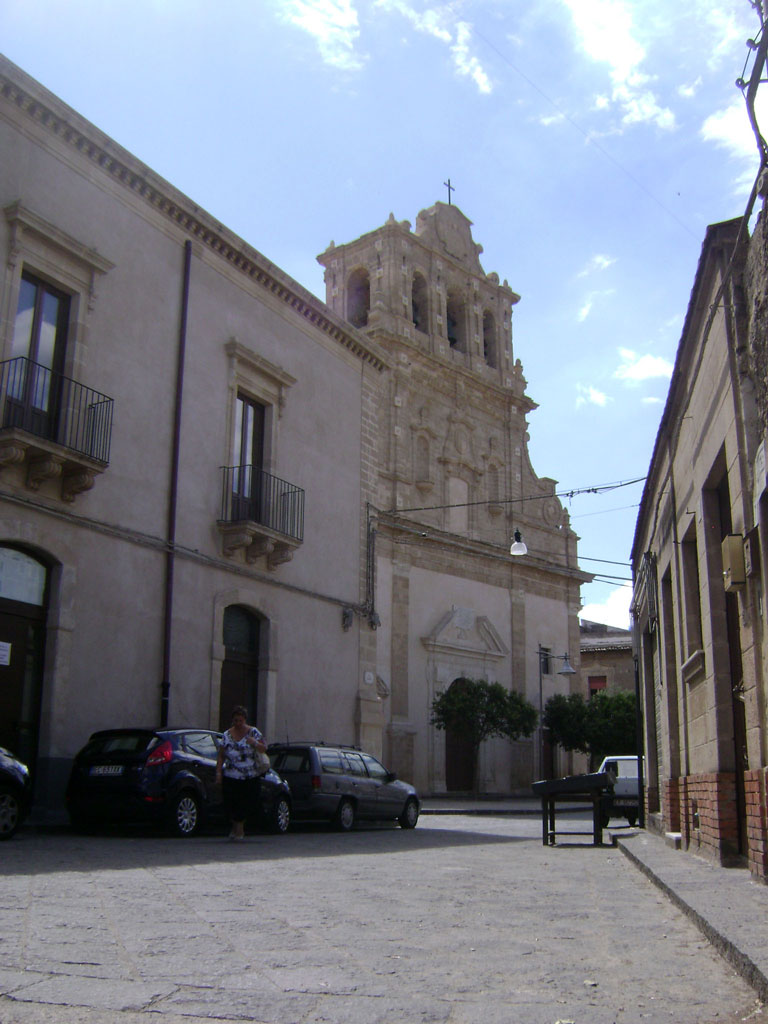
Partial view of the facade

Santa Maria Maggiore is a Roman Catholic church building in the town of Mineo, province of Catania, Sicily.

== History ==
The church was built adjacent to the site of the former castle of Ducezio. This was the first church in Mineo, with the site originally housing a pagan temple, but which was converted to church by around the 3rd to 4th century. The church we see now was mainly erected in the 16th century, when it was rebuilt after an earthquake in 1542. On the facade of the church are the coat of arms of the Buglio family, who patronized reconstruction. On the left of the facade is a portal once belonging to the adjacent castle. In front of the church are two worn lion sculptures, perhaps belonging to the original temple. The interior has a nave with two aisles and a number of lateral altars. In the church is an alabaster statue of Mary, Queen of Angels, donated by the Norman Count Ruggero in 1072.
