= San Pietro, Mineo =

Church in Sicily, Italy

Coordinates: 37.26656°N 14.68990°E

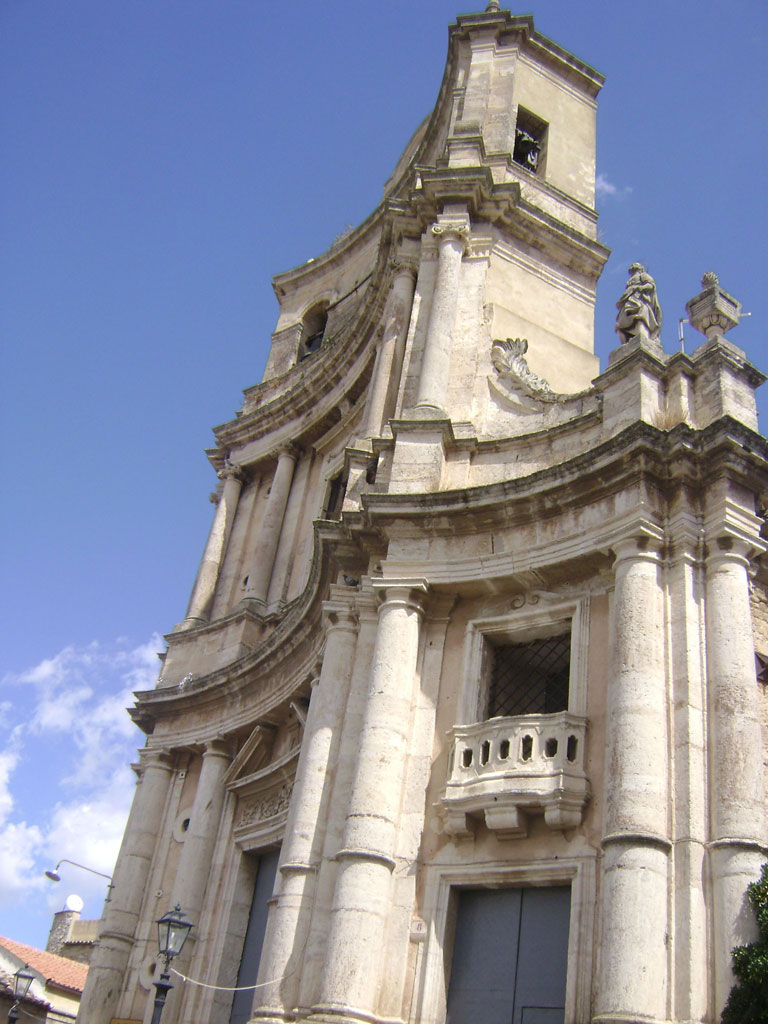
Side view of the facade

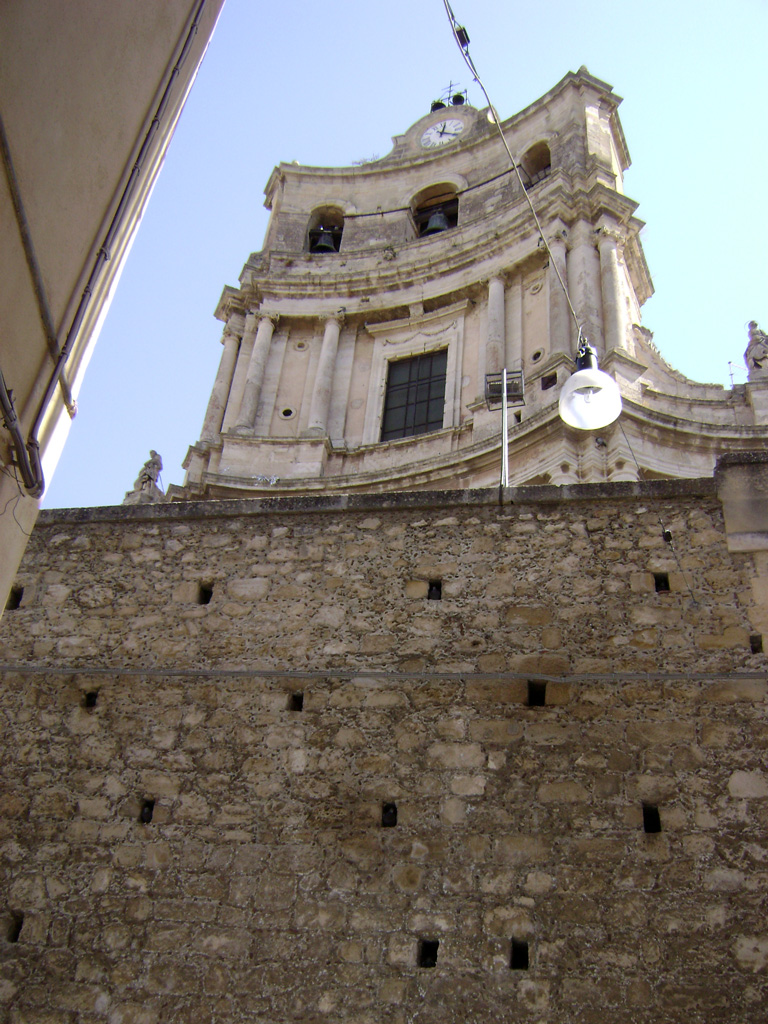
View of the top of the facade from the street below

San Pietro, or Santi Pietro e Paolo, is a Roman Catholic parish church building in the town of Mineo, province of Catania, Sicily.

== History ==
A church was located at the site by the time of the 1512 earthquake in this region. It was further damaged by the 1693 Sicily earthquake, leading to the Baroque-style of the present church. On the flank of the church is a walled portal from the older church.

The church is at a high point of town, The facade is elevated from the street by a tall plinth. The facade is convex with three elevations; each divided by heavy entablatures and cornices. The base has five pilasters with doric capitals flanking the entrance; the story above has ionic columns. The triangular tympanum above the entrance is interrupted by the cornice. Flanking the second floor are statues of the titular saints: Peter and Paul. The third level has sail like bell-tower and a clock, the latter is consistent with its completion in the late 19th-century.

The layout is that of a Latin cross structure with a central nave and two aisles. At the crossing is a dome. The polychrome stone and marble altar is surmounted by a large wooden cross. The interior also has a walnut wood choir and an organ built in 1772.
