= Olga Ozarovskaya =

Russian folklorist

- О́льга Эра́стовна Озаро́вская
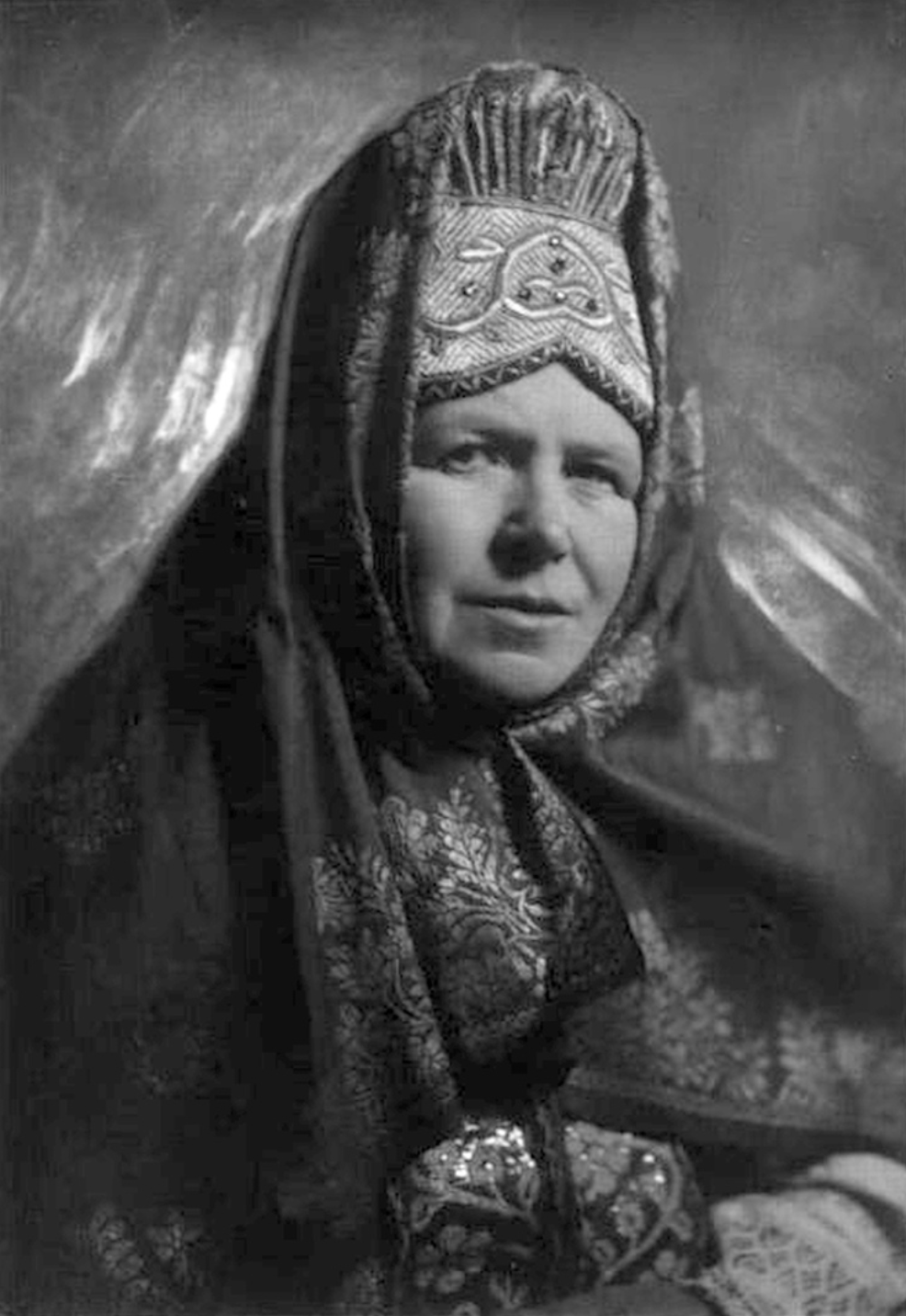
- Born: Olga Erastovna von Ozarovskaya; 13 May 1874; Tsarskoye Selo, Russian Empire
- Died: 12 July 1933 (aged 59); Frunze (now Bishkek), Kirghiz ASSR, Soviet Union
- Other names: Olga Erastovna Ozarovskaya
- Occupation(s): Folklorist, storyteller, performer, writer, archivist of fairy tales
- Spouse: Vasily Dmitrievich Sapozhnikov (m. 1901–1910; death)
- Children: 1, Vasilko Vasilyevich Ozarovsky

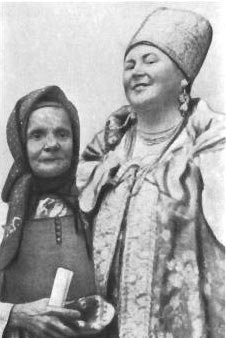
Mariya Krivopolenova (left) and Olga Ozarovskaya (right), 1915

Olga Erastovna Ozarovskaya (Russian: О́льга Эра́стовна Озаро́вская; 1874 – 1933) was a Russian folklorist, storyteller, performer, writer, and an archivist of fairy tales. She published a few Northern Russian folklore collection books. Additionally she was the first female civil servant, and the first women to do major scientific institution work within the Russian Empire. She worked with Russian folklore performer Mariya Krivopolenova.

== Early life and education ==
Olga Erastovna Ozarovskaya was born on May 13, 1874 in Tsarskoye Selo, Russian Empire to parents Erast Alexanrovich and Varvara Petrovna. Her father was in the Russian artillery. She had two brothers, Alexander Erastovich Ozarovsky, and Yuri Erastovich Ozarovsky. Her brother Alexander was a military officer, and her brother Yuri became an actor and the director of the Alexandrinsky Theatre.

She graduated with a degree in chemistry from St. Petersburg University (now Saint Petersburg State University); followed by graduating in 1897 with a degree in mathematics from Higher Women's Courses in St. Petersburg.

== Career and late life ==
From 1898 to 1900, she worked in a civil servant role as a lab technician at the Bureau of Weights and Measures, under chemist Dmitri Mendeleev. At this time in history, women did not hold civil service jobs in the Russian Empire; for her to be hired, the then-finance minister Sergei Witte needed to have a decree signed by Nicholas II of Russia. In 1901 she married Vasily Dmitrievich Sapozhnikov, someone she had met at the Bureau of Weights and Measures; and together they had one son, Vasilko Vasilyevich Ozarovsky. Her husband died in 1910.

In the early 20th-century around 1907, Ozarovskaya began performing in amateur circles and for societies. In 1911, she moved to Moscow and founded the Living Word Studio. Between 1915 and 1925, she travelled to Northern Russia four times in order to document the traditional Northern Russian folktales, songs, and epic stories. In 1915, Ozarovskaya had travelled to Arkhangelsk Governorate to collect songs, there she met Mariya Krivopolenova whom she took along with her to Moscow in order for her to perform. She also transcribed Krivopolenova's work, which helped her work gain popularity.

Ozarovskaya died on 12 July 1933 and buried in Frunze (now Bishkek), Kirghiz ASSR, Soviet Union. Her personal archive is stored in St. Petersburg, in the Pushkin State Museum of Fine Arts.

== Publications ==
- Ozarovskaya, Olga Erastovna; Krivopolenova, M.D (1916). Бабушкины старины [A Grandmothers Past] (in Russian). Издательство Огни.
- Ozarovskaya, Olga (1931). Пятиречие [Five Rivers] (in Russian).
- Ozarovskaya, Olga (2012). "The Luck of the Tsarevna". Russian Magic Tales from Pushkin to Platonov. Penguin Classics. Translated by Chandler, Robert. Aleksandr Pushkin (contributions), Nikolay Leskov (contributions), Vasily Grossman (contributions). Penguin UK. ISBN 9780141392547.

== See also ==
- Bylinas
