= Sogra, Verkhnetoyemsky District, Arkhangelsk Oblast =

Sogra Согра
- Village
- Location within Arkhangelsk Oblast Location within Russia
- Coordinates: 62°40′N 46°11′E
- Country: Russia
- Region: Arkhangelsk Oblast
- District: Verkhnetoyemsky District
- Time zone: UTC+3:00

Sogra (Russian: Согра) is a rural locality (a village) and the administrative center of Gorkovskoye Rural Settlement of Verkhnetoyemsky District, Arkhangelsk Oblast, Russia. The population was 523 as of 2010. There are 18 streets.

== Geography ==
Sogra is located 122 km northeast of Verkhnyaya Toyma (the district's administrative centre) by road. Keras is the nearest rural locality.
