= Agrippina of Mineo =

Sicilian saint and martyr (died 262)

Saint Agrippina of Mineo
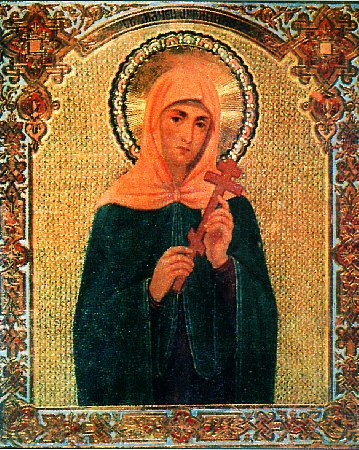
- Died: 262
- Feast: June 23 (Eastern Orthodox Church)
- Attributes: palm of martyrdom
- Patronage: Mineo; invoked against evil spirits, leprosy, thunderstorms, bacteria diseases, and bacterial infections

Agrippina of Mineo, also known as Saint Agrippina (flourished 3rd century, died 262) was venerated as a virgin martyr in the Catholic Church and Orthodox Christianity.

== Legend ==
Her legend states that she was a blonde princess born of a noble Roman family, and that she was martyred during the reign of Roman Emperor Valerian. She was either beheaded or scourged to death.

Her body was said to have been taken to Mineo, Sicily, by three devout Christian women named Bassa, Paula, and Agatonica, their travels aided by angels. Alban Butler says that the reputed acts in the Greek Menaia are quite unreliable and no evidence is forthcoming of any cultus of early date.

Her canonization date was 783 AD.

== Veneration ==
Saint Agrippina is greatly honored in Sicily and, to a lesser degree, in Greece, where it is said that her relics were translated from Sicily to Constantinople. Her tomb became a popular pilgrimage destination, and she was invoked as a patron saint against evil spirits, leprosy, and thunderstorms.

Her feast day is no longer celebrated in the Catholic Church; however, it is celebrated in the Orthodox Church on June 23.

There are three Catholic churches named after Saint Agrippina: the Church of Saint Agrippina is located in Mineo, Saint Agrippina'a parish church located in Rosario (Argentina) and the Chapel of Saint Agrippina di Mineo is located in Boston, Massachusetts. Immigrants from Mineo to the North End of Boston have celebrated their patron saint annually since 1914 during the first week of August.

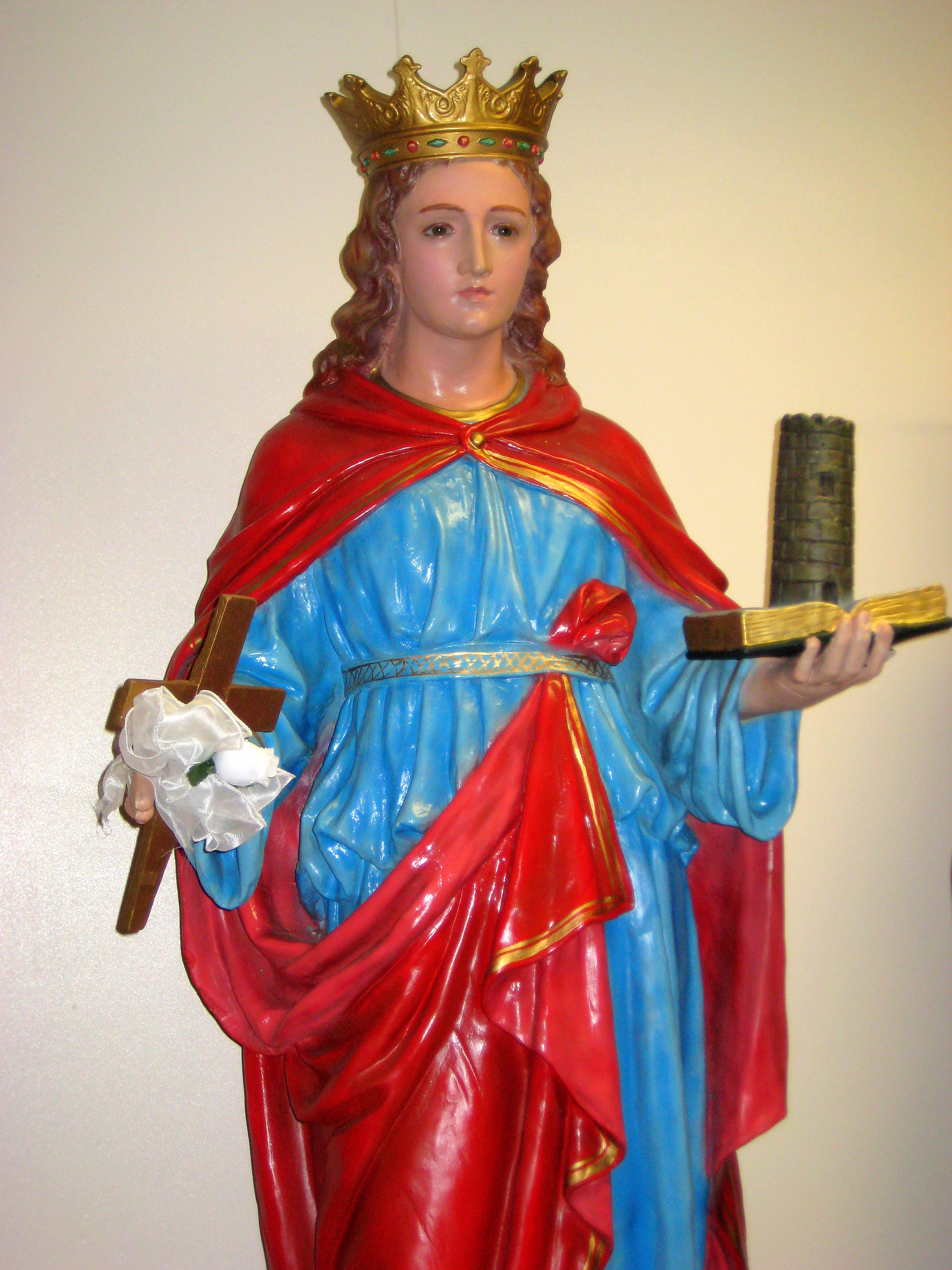
The original statue of St. Agrippina in the North End of Boston where her feast day is a large public festival. It is retired, but still displayed in the chapel, formerly at St. Leonard's Church.

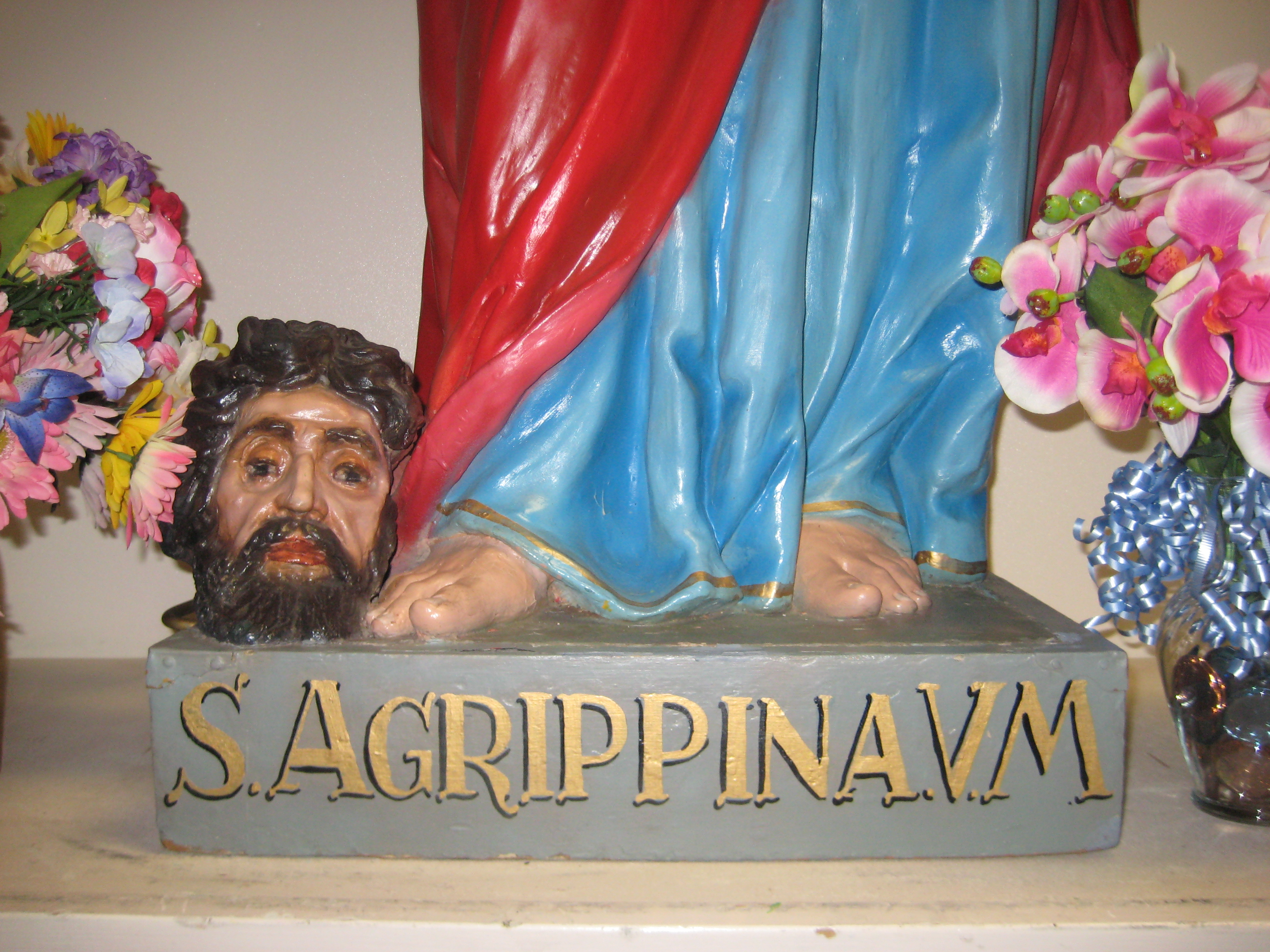
Detail of statue of St. Agrippina
