= Synaxis of All Saints of Vladimir =

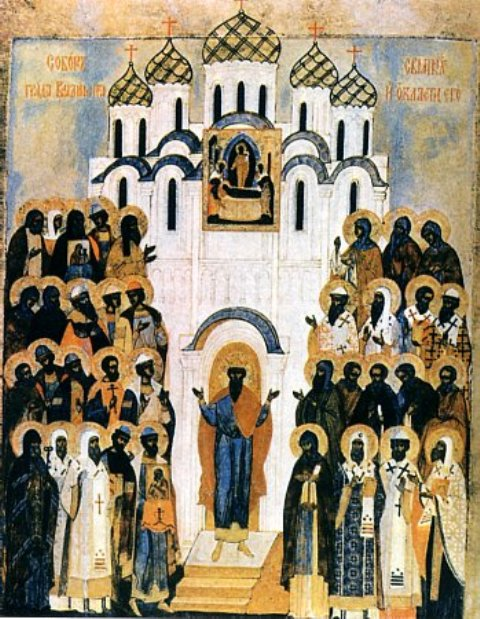
Synaxis of the saints of Vladimir (19th century icon

The Synaxis of all Saints of Vladimir is a holiday in honor of the saints of the Russian Orthodox Church, whose life was connected with the territory of the present Eparchy of Vladimir. It is held on June 23, according to the old style, which falls on July 6 for a new style. The synaxis festival was established in 1982 with the blessing of Patriarch Pimen on the day of the celebration of the Theotokos of Vladimir.

== List of Saints ==
=== Martyrs ===
- Avraamiy the Bulgarian († 1229)
- Mitrofan the Archbishop († 1238)
- Patrick the Holy Martyr († 1411)

=== Reverend ===
- Nikita of Pereyaslavl († 1186)
- Elijah Muromec of Pechersk (+ about 1188)
- Pachomius Archimandrite and Theodosius († 1237)
- Daniel of Uspensk (+ 1238)
- Mikhail of Vyazniki († 1333)
- Sergius of Radonezh († 1392)
- Roman of Kirzhach († 1392)
- Pakhomiy of Nerekhta († 1384)
- Evfimiy of Suzdal († 1404)
- Stefan of Makhra († 1406)
- Nikon of Radonezhy († 1426)
- Kosma of Yakhroma († 1492)
- Job, Archimandrite of Vladimir (XV century)
- Arkady of Vyazniki (+ 1592)
- Prokhor and Vassian of Zayastrebye (+ 1592)
- Dionysius of Pereyaslavl († 1645)
- Lukian of Aleksandrov († 1654)
- Cornelius of Aleksandrov († 1681)
- Zosima of Aleksandrov (+ about 1713)

=== Reverend Women ===
- Maria (monastic name: Martha) († 1206)
- Theodosia (monastic name: Euphrosyne) († 1244)
- Evfrosinia of Suzdal (+ 1250)
- Vassa (in the monastery of Theodore) Nizhny Novgorod († 1378)
- Sofia of Suzdal (+ 1542)
- Theodosius of Murom (XVII century)

=== Saints ===
==== Metropolitans ====
- Maksim of Kiev (+ 1305)
- Aleksy (Byakont) († 1378)
- Iona of Moscow († 1461)
- Hilarion of Suzdal (+ 1707)

==== Archbishops ====
- Dionysius of Suzdal († 1385)
- Arseniy of Elasson (+ 1625)

==== Bishops ====
- Theodore of Rostov (+ 1023)
- John of Rostov († 1214)
- Simon of Pechersk († 1226)
- Kirill of Rostov († 1262)
- Serapion of Vladimir († 1275)
- Theodore of Vladimir († 1286)
- Vasili of Ryazan († 1295)
- Sofroniy of Suzdal († 1654)
- Mitrofan of Voronezh (+ 1703)

=== Faithful ===
==== Princes ====
- Gleb of Murom († 1015),
- Konstantin of Murom (+ 1129),
- Mikhail and Fyodor of Murom (XII century)
- Boris of Turov (+ about 1160)
- Izyaslav Andreevich († 1165)
- Mstislav Iziaslavich († 1172)
- Andrei of Bogolyubovo (+ 1174)
- Gleb of Vladimir (+ 1174)
- Mikhail of Vladimir (+ 1176)
- Peter of Murom ( † 1228)
- Yuri Vsevolodovich († 1238)
- Vasilko of Rostov († 1238)
- Vsevolod Yuriyevich of Vladimir
- Mstislav Yuriyevich
- Vladimir of Vladimir
- Dimitry of Vladimir († 1238)
- Fyodor Yaroslavich of Vladimir († 1246)
- Svyatoslav Vsevolodovich († 1253)
- Aleksandr Nevsky (+ 1263)
- Dmitri Svyatoslavich of Yuryev († 1269)
- Dimitri Aleksandrovich († 1294)
- Theodore Starodubsky (+ 1330)

==== Princesses ====
- Irina of Murom († about 1129)
- Fevronia of Murom († 1228)
- Agathia, Theodora, Maria and Christina († 1238)
- Evdokia of Vladimir (XIV century)

=== Righteous ===
- Georgiy and Iulianiya of Murom (+ 1604)
- Karp of Medush (XVII century)
- Savva of Moshok (+ 1592)

=== Blessed ===
- Cyprian of Suzdal († 1622)
- Evdokia of Suzdal (+ 1776)
- Parthenius of Suzdal (+ second half of the 16th century)
