= Kushkopala =

Kushkopala Кушкопала
- Village
- Interactive map of Kushkopala
- Location of Kushkopala Kushkopala (Arkhangelsk Oblast)
- Coordinates: 63°50′N 44°45′E
- Country: Russia
- Federal subject: Arkhangelsk Oblast
- Administrative district: Pinezhsky District
- Selsoviet: Kushkopalsky Selsoviet
- Elevation: 30 m (98 ft)

Population (2010 Census)
  - Total: 803
  - Estimate (2012): 765 (−4.7%)

Administrative status
  - Capital of: Kushkopalsky Selsoviet

Municipal status
  - Municipal district: Pinezhsky Municipal District
  - Rural settlement: Kushkopalskoye Rural Settlement
  - Capital of: Kushkopalskoye Rural Settlement
- Time zone: UTC+3 (MSK)
- Postal code: 164605
- OKTMO ID: 11648416101

Kushkopala (Russian: Кушкопала) is a rural locality (a village) and the administrative center of Kushkopalsky Selsoviet of Pinezhsky District in Arkhangelsk Oblast, Russia, located on the left bank of the Pinega River. As of the 2010 Census, its population was 803.

There is a school and a kindergarten, some shops, a library, a club, a post office, an administrative building, a power-saw bench, and a logging enterprise in the village. Hunting and fishing are common. The majority of residents breed livestock and engage in gardening.
