= Sogra, Kotlassky District, Arkhangelsk Oblast =

Sogra Согра
- Village
- Location within Arkhangelsk Oblast Location within Russia
- Coordinates: 61°06′N 46°37′E
- Country: Russia
- Region: Arkhangelsk Oblast
- District: Kotlassky District
- Time zone: UTC+3:00

Sogra (Russian: Согра) is a rural locality (a village) in Cheryomushskoye Rural Settlement of Kotlassky District, Arkhangelsk Oblast, Russia. The population was 6 as of 2010.

== Geography ==
Sogra is located 19 km south of Kotlas (the district's administrative centre) by road. Chupanovo is the nearest rural locality.
