= Yedoma, Vologda Oblast =

Yedoma Едома
- Selo
- Location within Vologda Oblast Location within Russia
- Coordinates: 59°08′N 38°19′E
- Country: Russia
- Region: Vologda Oblast
- District: Sheksninsky District
- Time zone: UTC+3:00

Edoma (Russian: Едома) is a rural locality (a selo) in Zheleznodorozhnoye Rural Settlement, Sheksninsky District, Vologda Oblast, Russia. The population was 21 as of 2002.

== History ==
One of the ancient villages of the region. A charter of 1477 reports that in the middle of the 15th century. The village of Edoma in Ostafevskaya Slobodka was granted to the Moscow Simonov Monastery by the Belozersk prince Roman Ivanovich (ASEI, II, No. 391). In the 17th century this is the center of the Edoma volost (PK Vol 1678, 8).

== Etymology of the name ==
The name is given by the location of the village. The word edoma, borrowed from the finno-ugric languages, in the old russian language had the meaning “steep bank”, “any land distant from the village”, “swampy land”, “hilly land” (Sl RJ XI – XVII, V, 34 – 35). In karelian eda-, vepsian ey-, eda – 'distant', vepsian ta, karelian top, tia – 'earth, field' (Subbotina, 49).

== Geography ==
Yedoma is located 18 km southwest of Sheksna (the district's administrative centre) by road. Maurino is the nearest rural locality.
