= Zanyukhcha =

Zanyukhcha Занюхча
- Village
- Location within Arkhangelsk Oblast Location within Russia
- Coordinates: 63°26′N 46°32′E
- Country: Russia
- Region: Arkhangelsk Oblast
- District: Pinezhsky District
- Time zone: UTC+3:00

Zanyukhcha (Russian: Занюхча) is a rural locality (a village) and the administrative center of Nyukhchenskoye Rural Settlement of Pinezhsky District, Arkhangelsk Oblast, Russia. The population was 335 as of 2010. There are 6 streets.

== Geography ==
Zanyukhcha is located on the Nyukhcha River, 151 km southeast of Karpogory (the district's administrative centre) by road. Nyukhcha is the nearest rural locality, just across the Nyukcha.
