= Arkhangelsky Uyezd =

Arkhangelsky Uyezd (Архангельский уезд) was one of the subdivisions of the Arkhangelsk Governorate of the Russian Empire. It was situated in the central part of the governorate. Its administrative centre was Arkhangelsk.

== Demographics ==
At the time of the Russian Empire Census of 1897, Arkhangelsky Uyezd had a population of 60,957. Of these, 98.0% spoke Russian, 0.5% Polish, 0.4% German, 0.4% Yiddish, 0.1% Lithuanian, 0.1% Estonian, 0.1% Komi-Zyrian, 0.1% Belarusian and 0.1% Ukrainian as their native language.
