= Pinezhsky District =

Pinezhsky District Пинежский район (Russian)
- District
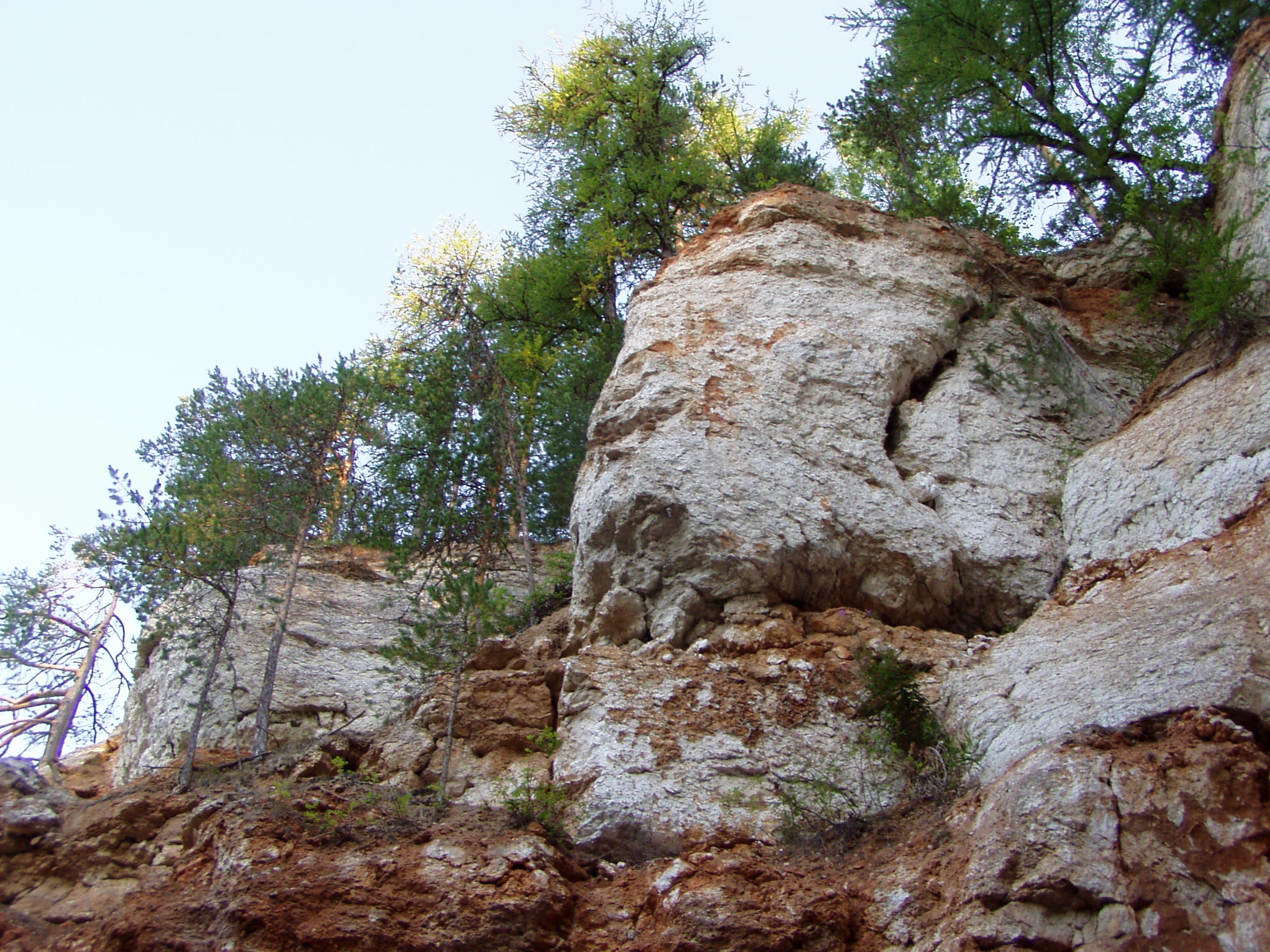
- A karst cave in Pinezhsky Nature Reserve in Pinezhsky District

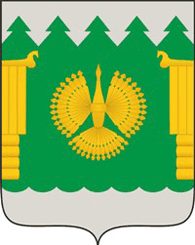
- Flag Coat of arms
- Location of Pinezhsky District in Arkhangelsk Oblast
- Coordinates: 64°04′N 44°27′E
- Country: Russia
- Federal subject: Arkhangelsk Oblast
- Established: July 15, 1929
- Administrative center: Karpogory

Area
  - Total: 32,100 km^{2} (12,400 sq mi)

Population (2010 Census)
  - Total: 26,978
  - Density: 0.840/km^{2} (2.18/sq mi)
  - Urban: 0%
  - Rural: 100%

Administrative structure
  - Administrative divisions: 17 selsoviet
  - Inhabited localities: 124 rural localities

Municipal structure
  - Municipally incorporated as: Pinezhsky Municipal District
  - Municipal divisions: 0 urban settlements, 15 rural settlements
- Time zone: UTC+3 (MSK)
- OKTMO ID: 11648000
- Website: http://www.pinezhye.ru/

Pinezhsky District (Пи́нежский райо́н) is an administrative district (raion), one of the twenty-one in Arkhangelsk Oblast, Russia. Municipally, it is incorporated as Pinezhsky Municipal District. It is located in the northeast of the oblast and borders with Mezensky District in the north, Leshukonsky District and Udorsky District of the Komi Republic in the east, Verkhnetoyemsky District in the south, Vinogradovsky District in the southwest, Kholmogorsky District in the west, and with Primorsky District in the northwest. Its administrative center is the rural locality (a selo) of Karpogory. District's population: 26,978 (2010 census); 33,516 (2002 census); 40,486 (1989 Soviet census). The population of Karpogory accounts for 16.5% of the district's total population.

== Geography ==
The district is elongated from the northwest to the southeast; a major part of it belongs to the basin of the Pinega River which divides the district into roughly equal areas.

The main tributaries of the Pinega within the district are the Yula (left), the Pokshenga (left), and the Yezhuga (right). The northern part of the district belongs to the basins of the Kuloy River and its major right tributary, the Nemnyuga. Minor areas in the east of the district drain across the border of the district to the Mezen River. The whole area of the district is in the White Sea basin.

Almost the whole of the district is covered by coniferous forests (taiga). The exception are the meadows in the floodplains. There are many glacial lakes across the district, especially in its northern part. The biggest lakes are Teldozero, Poltozero, Karasozero (all in the northern part of the district), and Krasny Okun (in its southern part).

Karst landscapes, with karst caves, formed in the middle course of the Pinega, now inside the district limits. These hilly landscapes contrast with the plain to the west, in the valley of the Northern Dvina River. Pinezhsky Nature Reserve, located within the district limits, had been created to protect these landscapes and designated as a protected natural area at the federal level.

== History ==
The area was originally populated by speakers of Uralic languages and then colonized by the Novgorod Republic. After the fall of Novgorod, the area became a part of the Grand Duchy of Moscow. In the course of the administrative reform carried out in 1708 by Peter the Great, the area was included into Archangelgorod Governorate, with the creation of Kevrolsky Uyezd. The seat of the uyezd was located in Kevrola, now a village. In 1780, the governorate was abolished and transformed into Vologda Viceroyalty, with the creation of Pinezhsky Uyezd in place of Kevrolsky Uyezd. The seat of the uyezd was in Pinega. In 1796, Pinezhsky Uyezd was transferred to Arkhangelsk Governorate. In 1925, the town of Pinega, while still being the administrative center of the uyezd, was downgraded in status to that of a rural locality. In February 1927, Pinezhsky Uyezd was abolished and merged into Arkhangelsky Uyezd.

In 1929, several governorates were merged into Northern Krai. On July 15, 1929, the uyezds were abolished and Pinezhsky District was established. Pinezhsky District became a part of Arkhangelsk Okrug of Northern Krai. At the same time, Karpogorsky District, with the administrative center in the selo of Karpogory, was established. In 1959, Karpogorsky and Pinezhsky Districts were merged into one district with the administrative center located in Karpogory.

In the following years, the first-level administrative division of Russia kept changing. In 1930, the okrug was abolished, and the district was subordinated to the central administration of Northern Krai. In 1936, the krai itself was transformed into Northern Oblast. In 1937, Northern Oblast was split into Arkhangelsk Oblast and Vologda Oblast. Pinezhsky District remained in Arkhangelsk Oblast ever since.

== Divisions ==
=== Administrative divisions ===
Administratively, the district is divided into seventeen selsoviets. The following selsoviets have been established (the administrative centers are given in parentheses):

- Chakolsky (Chakola)
- Karpogorsky (Karpogory)
- Kevrolsky (Kevrola)
- Kushkopalsky (Kushkopala)
- Lavelsky (Novolavela)
- Mezhdurechensky (Mezhdurechensky)
- Nyukhchensky (Zanyukhcha)
- Pinezhsky (Pinega)
- Pokshengsky (Kobelevo)
- Shilegsky (Yasny)
- Shotogorsky (Shotogorka)
- Siysky (Siya)
- Sosnovsky (Sosnovka)
- Sursky (Sura)
- Trufanogorsky (Trufanova)
- Verkolsky (Verkola)
- Yurolsky (Petrova)

=== Municipal divisions ===
Municipally, the district is divided into fifteen rural settlements (the administrative centers are given in parentheses):

- Karpogorskoye Rural Settlement (Karpogory)
- Kevrolskoye Rural Settlement (Kevrola)
- Kushkopalskoye Rural Settlement (Kushkopala)
- Lavelskoye Rural Settlement (Novolavela)
- Mezhdurechenskoye Rural Settlement (Mezhdurechensky)
- Nyukhchenskoye Rural Settlement (Zanyukhcha)
- Pinezhskoye Rural Settlement (Pinega)
- Pirinemskoye Rural Settlement (Pirinem)
- Pokshengskoye Rural Settlement (Kobelevo)
- Shilegskoye Rural Settlement (Yasny)
- Siyskoye Rural Settlement (Siya)
- Sosnovskoye Rural Settlement (Sosnovka)
- Surskoye Rural Settlement (Sura)
- Trufanogorskoye Rural Settlement (Trufanova)
- Verkolskoye Rural Settlement (Verkola)

== Economy ==
=== Industry ===
Timber industry is the main industry of the district. Food industry is also present.

=== Agriculture ===
Agriculture accounts for 0.1% of the total production, and is mainly represented by cattle breeding and production of potatoes.

=== Transportation ===
A railway line connecting Arkhangelsk and Karpogory passes through the district. This line is expected to become part of the Belkomur project—a railway line connecting Arkhangelsk via the Komi Republic with Perm Krai and the Ural Mountains. The stretch between Arkhangelsk and Karpogory was built in the 1970s.

The Pinega River is navigable below the village of Sogra, although there is no regular passenger navigation. In 1926–1928, a canal connecting the Pinega with the Kuloy was constructed; however, currently the canal is neglected.

An important road along the right bank of the Pinega connects Arkhangelsk with the valley of the Mezen River. The road within the limits of the district is not paved. From this road another one, also unpaved, branches off and follows the Pinega to Karpogory, the village of Zanyukhcha, and then crosses the border with the Komi Republic to the timber production settlements.

== Culture and recreation ==
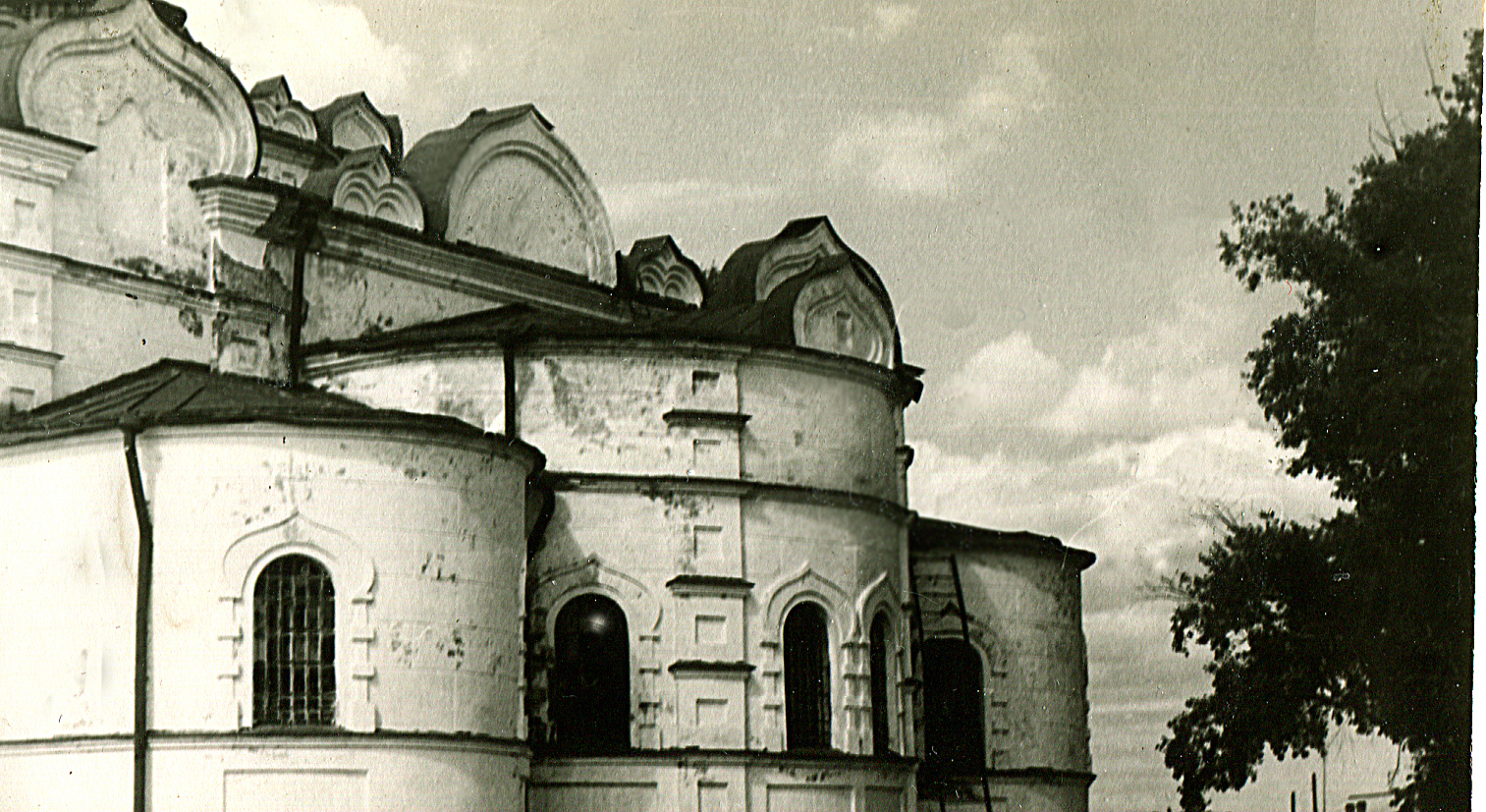
Ruins of the Assumption Cathedral of the former Ioanno-Bogoslovsky Monastery, Sura

The district contains twenty objects classified as cultural and historical heritage by Russian Federal law and additionally one object classified as cultural and historical heritage of local importance (the chapel in the village of Kushkopala). The monuments protected at the federal level include:

- the buildings in the village of Verkola, including the ensemble of Artemiyev Verkolsky Monastery (the oldest building, the St. Iliya Church, is from 1697)
- Chukhchenemsky Pogost in the village of Yedoma
- Krasnogorsky Monastery in the village of Maletino

There are two state museums in the district — the District Museum in the settlement of Pinega and the memorial museum of the author Fyodor Abramov in the selo of Verkola, located in the building of the school where he studied.

In 2004, the Karst Museum was open in the Pinezhsky Nature Reserve. The reserve attracts tourists who visit karst caves.
