= Pinezhsky Uyezd =

Subdivision of Arkhangelsk Goverorate of Russian Empire

Pinezhsky Uyezd (Пинежский уезд) was one of the subdivisions of the Arkhangelsk Governorate of the Russian Empire. It was situated in the central part of the governorate. Its administrative centre was Pinega.

== Demographics ==
At the time of the Russian Empire Census of 1897, Pinezhsky Uyezd had a population of 28,788. Of these, 99.8% spoke Russian, 0.1% Polish and 0.1% Romani as their native language.
