= Karpogory =

Karpogory Карпогоры
- Selo
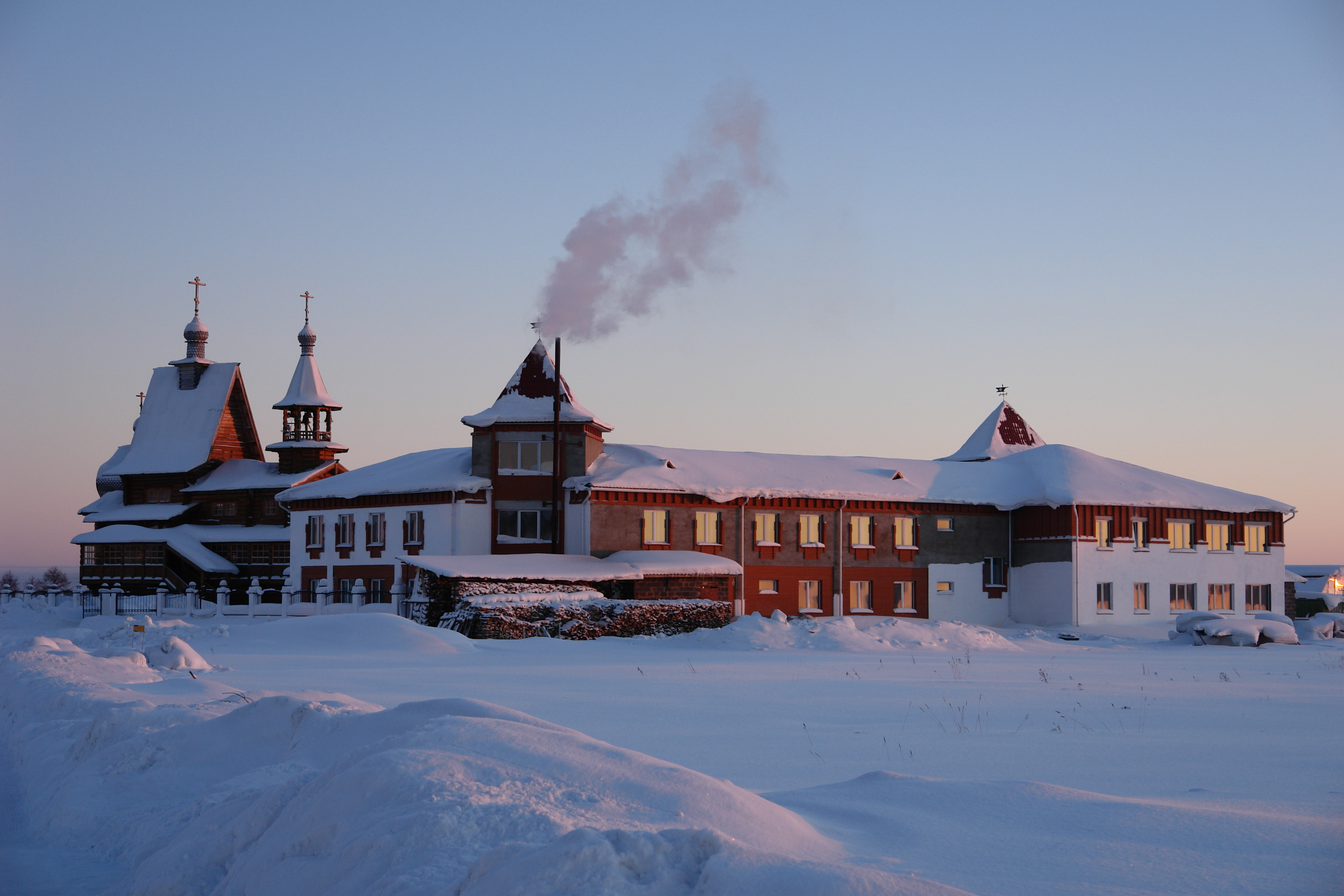
- Interactive map of Karpogory
- Location of Karpogory Karpogory (Arkhangelsk Oblast)
- Coordinates: 64°00′17″N 44°26′22″E
- Country: Russia
- Federal subject: Arkhangelsk Oblast
- Administrative district: Pinezhsky District
- Selsoviet: Karpogorsky Selsoviet

Population (2010 Census)
  - Total: 4,443
  - Estimate (2021): 3,404 (−23.4%)

Administrative status
  - Capital of: Pinezhsky District, Karpogorsky Selsoviet

Municipal status
  - Municipal district: Pinezhsky Municipal District
  - Rural settlement: Karpogorskoye Rural Settlement
  - Capital of: Pinezhsky Municipal District, Karpogorskoye Rural Settlement
- Time zone: UTC+3 (MSK)
- Postal code: 164600
- OKTMO ID: 11648408101

Karpogory (Russian: Карпого́ры) is a rural locality (a selo) and the administrative center of Pinezhsky District, Arkhangelsk Oblast, Russia, located on the right bank of the Pinega River. It also serves as the administrative center of Karpogorsky Selsoviet, one of the seventeen selsoviets into which the district is administratively divided. Municipally, it is the administrative center of Karpogorskoye Rural Settlement. Population: 4,443 (2010 census); 4,617 (2002 census); 5,335 (1989 Soviet census).

== Geography ==
Karpogory is located on the right bank of the Pinega River, at the confluence of the Soga River. Several kilometers downstream from Karpogory, the Pinega accepts the Pokshenga, one of its major tributaries, from the left.

== History ==
The area was originally populated by speakers of Uralic languages and then colonized by the Novgorod Republic. In the 19th century, Karpogory was an administrative center of Karpogorskaya Volost and was part of the Pinezhsky Uyezd of the Arkhangelsk Governorate. In February 1927, Pinezhsky Uyezd was abolished and merged into Arkhangelsky Uyezd.

In 1929, several governorates were merged into Northern Krai. July 15, 1929 the uyezds were abolished, and Karpogorsky District, with the center in Karpogory, was established. In 1936, the Krai was transformed into Northern Oblast. In 1937, Northern Oblast was split into Arkhangelsk Oblast and Vologda Oblast. In 1959, Karpogorsky and Pinezhsky Districts merged into the greater Pinezhsky District with the center of Karpogory.

== Economy ==
=== Industry ===
Timber and food industry are present.

=== Transportation ===
Karpogory is connected to Arkhangelsk by a railway line with the regular passenger service. This line is expected to become part of the Belkomur project — a railroad connecting Arkhangelsk via the Komi Republic with the Perm Krai and the Ural Mountains.

The Pinega River is navigable in Karpogory, although there is no regular passenger navigation.

An unpaved road along the Pinega connects Karpogory with Arkhangelsk on the north and the village of Zanyukhcha on the south. Further south it crosses the border with the Komi Republic to the timber production settlements.

There is an airport in Karpogory, not used for regular passenger service.

== Culture and recreation ==
The Sts. Peter and Paul Church in Karpogory was built in 2005. This is a wooden church constructed in the style of the 17th century.
