= Antonio Gan Vargas =

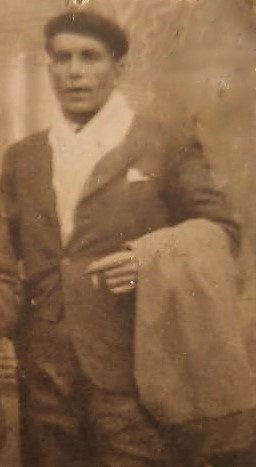
- Born: July 31st 1917; Málaga
- Died: March 25th 1947; Benagéber
- Cause of death: Killed by the Guardia Civil
- Other names: Cubano, Vargas
- Parents: Juan (father); Juana (mother)

Antonio Gan Vargas ‘Cubano’ (Málaga, 31 July 1917 – Benagéber, 25 March 1947) was one of the anti-Franco guerrilla fighters of the Agrupación Guerrillera de Levante y Aragón (AGLA).

During the Civil War, he was part of the XIV Cuerpo de Ejército Guerrillero, commanded by Domingo Ungría. When the war ended, after being detained in the Albatera concentration camp and the Porta Coeli prison, he joined the armed groups of the Partido Comunista de España (PCE) in Valencia and later the maquis, forming part of the "11th sector" of the AGLA, which operated in the mountains between Valencia and Cuenca, in the region of Los Serranos. He was known by the nicknames ‘Cubano’ and ‘Vargas’.

On 18 March 1947, he was wounded in a clash with the Guardia Civil near Requena and was hidden for several days by his comrades in various safe houses until 25 March, when he was surprised and machine-gunned in one of these houses in the village of Nieva, in Benagéber (Valencia). Between that day and the next, the Guardia Civil killed seven more men who were buried unidentified in the local cemetery, from where they were exhumed in March 2010.

== Biography ==
=== Childhood and family ===
Antonio Gan Vargas was born in Málaga in 1917, although his father, Juan Gan Arcos, and his mother, Juana Vargas Arcos, were from Doña Mencía (Córdoba). Around 1915 or 1916, Juan Gan moved with his wife and three older children to Málaga, where Antonio and his two other siblings were born. Around 1928, ruined, Juan Gan and his family settled in Vallecas, then an independent municipality and since 1950 a neighborhood of Madrid.

When Franco's uprising took place in 1936, Antonio joined the Republican Ejército Popular as a specialist in sabotage and guerrilla warfare, first assigned to the so-called ‘Brigada Especial Ungría,’ from where he would move on to a guerrilla group of the International Brigades called the 'Batallón de Instrucción de Defensa contra Aeronaves' (BIDCA), which, in turn, later became part of the 'XIV Cuerpo de Ejército Guerrillero'.

We have direct accounts of the beginnings of the group led by Domingo Ungría (Note: Domingo Ungría Navarro, born in Pontones de Segura (Jaén) in 1902, was exiled to France for revolutionary activities before the start of the Civil War. At the end of the war, he left for the Soviet Union and later joined the maquis in France, where he died on an unknown date and in unknown circumstances at the end of the Second World War. In some sources, his name appears as Hungría.) from Russian adviser Ilya Starinov (Note: Starinov was born in 1900 in the Orel region, near Ukraine, and after playing an important role in the World War, he died in Moscow in 2000.) and his translator and later wife, Anna Kornilovna Starinova. (Note: Anna Kornilovna was born in Dorogorskoe, in the Arkhangelsk region, just over 100 km from the Arctic Circle, and her maiden name was Deriagina.) Starinov was a soldier with experience in this type of action during the Russian Civil War and played a key role in training Ungría's unit until his departure from Spain. In February 1937, Antonio Gan was already part of this unit and was stationed on the Andalusian front. On the 18th of that month, he and five other men, accompanied by two guides, attempted to blow up the railway line at El Montón de la Tierra, near Alcolea, without success. The Stárinovs describe actions around that time in Alcolea, Pozoblanco and other towns near Córdoba. In April 1937, the General Staff created a ‘Batallón de Guerrilleros’ under the command of Major Alberto Calderón Martínez, and Ungría's group was incorporated into it as the ‘3rd Company’. On 12 October, Antonio participated, as Lieutenant of the ‘5th Company of the Batallón de Guerrilleros’, in command of four men, in the placement of explosive devices on the Zuera-Jaca railway line on the Aragon front.

The 'Batallón de Instrucción de Defensa contra Aeronaves' (BIDCA) adopted this name in November 1937 and was initially commanded by Major Luis Cordes, also a Soviet advisor. (Note: Alias of the Russian – probably of Polish origin – Konstantin Boleslavovič Rodzevič (also appears as Roževič) who, in 1923, in Prague, had had an affair with the Russian poet Marina Tsvetaeva, inspiring her to write ‘The Poem of the Mountain’ (1924) and ‘The Poem of the End’ (1926).) (Note: Some of Rodzevich's papers are held at the Bibliothèque de Documentation Internationale Contemporaine (BDIC) at the Université Paris Ouest in Nanterre.) Towards the end of that same year, the Yugoslav Ljubo Ilić (Note: Born in Split, on the Dalmatian coast of Croatia, in 1905. He was wounded in the arm on the Aragon front and, on the verge of losing it to gangrene, Doctor Josep Trueta successfully applied his famous method to prevent it in war wounds. Antonina Rodrigo recounts this in her book Doctor Trueta: héroe anónimo de dos guerras, Barcelona, Plaza & Janés, 1980, pp. 61-64. During the Second World War, Ilić was the military leader of the French maquis of the Francs-tireurs et partisans – main-d'œuvre immigrée (FTP-MOI) and became the only non-French general of the Forces françaises de l'intérieur (FFI). When the war ended, married to the famous Croatian soprano Zinka Milanov, he held various diplomatic posts in the nascent republic of Yugoslavia. He died in New York in 1991. He is cited under the names Ljubomir, Ljoubomir, Ljoubo or Ljubo; as for his surname, it is found as Ilić, Ilich, Ilyich or Ilitch.) took command. The BIDCA then consisted of three sections with a total of 1,306 men and 263 officers and non-commissioned officers, including Antonio Gan who, with the rank of lieutenant, was part of the section commanded by Ilić himself – assisted by Antonio Buitrago (Note: Antonio Buitrago Ruiz de Ubago (or Ubaco) was born in Puertollano (Ciudad Real); arrested at the end of the war, he managed to escape to France, where he joined the guerrilla movement against the Nazis, who arrested him in 1942 and tortured him to death.) – and which operated in Andalusia.

=== The 'XIV Cuerpo de Ejército Guerrillero' ===
On 3 February 1938, Vicente Rojo ordered the creation of the 'XIV Cuerpo de Ejército Guerrillero', whose main training camp was in Benimámet, on the outskirts of Valencia. This unit, which despite its name ‘Army Corps’ (Cuerpo de Ejército) only had a few thousand men, was under the command of Domingo Ungría, who continued to be advised by Soviet military personnel. One of its most spectacular actions was the liberation of 300 Republican prisoners from Fort Carchuna, about 10 kilometres east of Motril, on 23 May 1938.

Antonio Gan belonged to the 230th Brigade (actually the former ‘5th Company’) of the 'XIV Cuerpo de Ejército', commanded by Major José Carnicer and attached to the Andalusian front, although it would also be deployed in April 1938 to the Aragon front, where it took part in the risky operation to aid the ’Bolsa de Bielsa" (Bielsa Pocket), where the 43rd Republican Division was trapped. At that time, Gan was ‘Captain-in-Chief’ of that brigade after replacing the deceased Alex Künstlich (Note: Peter N. Carroll has studied the careers of three Americans who participated on the front lines in these Republican guerrilla activities: Alex Kunslich (or Künstlich), who would die in Spain, William Aalto, and Irving Goff. All three were recruited by Ungría's group in Albacete and took part in the actions described by the Starínovs in Teruel and Córdoba, as well as in the Carchuna operation. It has been pointed out on numerous occasions that Hemingway was most likely inspired by these three compatriots when creating his character Robert Jordan in For Whom the Bell Tolls (1940). Carroll, Peter N.: La odisea de la Brigada Abraham Lincoln: los norteamericanos en la Guerra Civil española, Seville, Espuela de Plata, 2005, especially pages 336 to 341.) in command in May 1938.

On 5 March 1939, Colonel Casado staged a coup on the Republican side, triggering the end of the war, and the following day Casado's 'Junta' dissolved the 'XIV Cuerpo de Ejército'. Some of its units were trapped in the large pocket of Alicante, unable to leave the country, and, of course, they remained loyal to the Communists during those days. Among other interventions, when the President of the Government, Juan Negrín, took up residence on 25 February at the ‘Yuste Position’ on an estate in Petrer (Alicante), 300 men from the 'XIV Cuerpo de Ejército' were in charge of the garrison; on 6 March, they also protected the take-off from El Hondón aerodrome (Monóvar, Alicante) of three aeroplanes carrying the leaders of the PCE on their way into exile.

=== Albatera Camp: 1939 ===
When the war ended, Antonio Gan was sent to the concentration camp in El Saladar, Albatera (Alicante). It is highly likely that he was also among the twenty to thirty thousand people who waited in the port of Alicante in the last days of March for an evacuation by ship that never came. Taken prisoner by Franco's army, most of them were taken to the so-called Campo de los Almendros, very close to the city, on 1 April. There they remained for several days without food or water and in the open, with no protection or shelter other than what they were wearing. Shortly afterwards, on 7 April, they were all marched to the Albatera camp.

The camp would eventually hold between 14,000 and 20,000 prisoners from Franco's victory until its closure in December 1939, and its conditions of accommodation and, above all, food were very poor. When it rained, there was nowhere to shelter; the latrines consisted of a ditch and, of course, there was no way to wash. The treatment of prisoners was – as in all camps – humiliating and tyrannical, and there were repeated executions without trial, usually for failed escape attempts. The camp was closed in October 1939, once the authorities had finished classifying the prisoners to find out “who was who”.

[After several days without food] ‘We began to receive a 200 g tin of sardines for two and a 250 g loaf of bread for five [...] We were supplied by a 4,000-litre tanker, which was clearly insufficient [for more than 12,000 people].’

'On Tuesday, 11 April, we had a quarter of a tin of cooked lentils and a fifth of a loaf of bread. On Wednesday, Thursday and Friday, we ate absolutely nothing. On Saturday the 15th, we were given a tin of sardines for three and a loaf of bread for five. Then we fasted again completely on Sunday, Monday, Tuesday, Wednesday and Thursday, to receive another 66 grams of sardines and about 40 grams of bread on Friday."

Albatera was home to many communist leaders and intellectuals, such as the future historian Manuel Tuñón de Lara, the poet Marcos Ana, several maquis members who will be discussed later, and the communist leader ‘Heriberto Quiñones’. Today, part of the land has been developed, although a small hut that appears to have been used as a storeroom or kitchen still remains. Max Aub wrote a novel – undoubtedly based on many first-hand accounts – about his days in the port of Alicante, Campo de los Almendros and Albatera, entitled Campo de los Almendros.

=== Porta Coeli Prison and Padre Jofré Sanatorium: October 1939 – October 1942 ===
In the autumn of 1939, according to Sixto Agudo, all the prisoners in Albatera were taken to the Porta Coeli tuberculosis sanatorium in Serra (Valencia), about twelve kilometres north of Bétera, which was also functioning as a concentration camp at the time; in all likelihood, Antonio Gan must have made the same journey. Shortly after the transfer from Albatera, Porta Coeli went from being a ‘camp’ to becoming a prison, and the prisoners were ‘transferred’ from one establishment to another – from an administrative point of view – and duly registered. Antonio Gan's file shows his date of entry as 1 December 1939, ‘coming from the dissolved Porta Coeli Prisoner Concentration Camp’. Shortly afterwards, on 15 January 1940, due to ‘symptoms of mental alienation’, Antonio was transferred to the Padre Jofré psychiatric sanatorium in Valencia. Two and a half years later, on 15 September 1942, Gan returned to Porta Coeli and was released a month later.

=== To arms once again: Valencia 1943–1946 ===
The first news of Antonio Gan after his release is found in case file 298-V-44 of the AGHD-V: according to this document, he was part of the ‘military apparatus’ or ‘action groups’ of the Valencian PCE since 1943. This ‘apparatus’ carried out actions in the city of Valencia and nearby towns similar to those later carried out by the maquis: bank robberies, elimination of authorities or alleged infiltrators, hanging of republican flags, graffiti and distribution of propaganda. It was largely made up of former members of the XIV Cuerpo de Ejército Guerrillero, which Salvador Fernández Cava calls ‘the true embryo of the AGLA’.

According to Fernández Cava, Rafael Gandía Andrés ‘Gandi’ (Note: Born in Mogente (Valencia) in 1916, he was arrested in October 1945 and executed by firing squad in Paterna in October 1950.) was head of this military apparatus in 1943, later to be replaced by ‘Vargas’, the alias by which Antonio Gan was known during his time in Valencia. In the aforementioned case file, several detainees attribute to Vargas alone the placement of Republican flags on the Torres de Serranos and in front of the Civil Government on 17 May 1944.

From the documentation in case file 298-V-44, it appears that, during his time in Valencia, Antonio Gan's best friend was Gandi, with whom he had a photograph taken (now lost) in the Jardines de Viveros. Gandi also states that ‘he intended to take him to work with him [as a bricklayer] so that he could earn more money than at La Atlántida”' and that, with some of the money from the robbery described below, he ordered a suit from the tailor's shop at 23 Maldonado Street. He states that Antonio Gan lives in a dilapidated factory in El Grao and that he was building him a shack.

Víctor G. Labrado, based on the recollections of Manuel Martínez Ferrándiz, recounts how Rafael Sáez Andrés, at the urging of his cousin Gandi, formed a group of four activists in Benetúser (a town near Valencia) in 1945. Shortly afterwards, Gandi introduced Antonio Gan to his cousin:

'Gandía addressed the one who seemed to be the most important:

–Let me introduce you to my cousin. I've already told you about him.

The man was very well dressed. He seemed astute and of few words. He was slim and determined. He had very black hair.'

They discussed forming the group and the need to raise money for it:

‘Here the well-dressed man with black hair intervened: –“I'll take care of that” – he wanted to say that there was no need to talk about it, that they could trust him completely. If they entrusted him with the mission, they could consider it properly resolved. He was a very self-confident man. He wanted everything to remain in his hands.’

On 6 October 1945, a group led by Antonio Gan robbed the Banco Popular de Previsores del Porvenir bank in Valencia's Plaza del Pintor Segrelles, making off with 210,200 pesetas: a considerable sum at the time.

‘[Early on the morning of the robbery], Arcadio and I were there […]. We saw two other men we didn’t know at all. They seemed to be more experienced. Gan Vargas arrived shortly afterwards. He looked like a gypsy. They called him Antonio Gan Vargas: he couldn’t have been more gypsy-like. […] Antonio Gan Vargas gathered them around a table [in a bar]. He spoke like an educated man. Given the gravity of the moment, his calmness was much appreciated.'

Manuel was the one who waited outside the bank in the taxi they had taken to carry out the robbery. This is how a Valencian newspaper reported the event the following day:

'The surprising entrance [into the bank] of the individuals in question was followed by a cynical greeting to the employees of the establishment by the one who appeared to be the leader of the group and who was the best dressed, saying loudly, ‘"Good morning, lads. Hands up! Let's see if you're good boys".’

=== In the maquis: February 1946 – March 1947 ===
The years of greatest activity by the 'Agrupaciones Guerrilleras' led by the PCE began in 1945, a difficult year for Franco's government: on 19 March, Juan de Borbón, father of King Juan Carlos, published the ‘Manifesto of Lausanne’, distancing himself from Francoism (temporarily, as it turned out); in April and May, at the Conference of San Francisco (USA) , where the United Nations was born, Spain was denied admission and a condemnation of the regime was approved; on 7 May, the Nazis surrendered and in July, the Labour Party won the elections in the UK. In February 1946, France closed its border in protest at the execution of Cristino García Granda, and on 12 December of that year, the UN recommended the withdrawal of ambassadors. These were months in which all anti-Franco groups – not just the PCE – believed that the Allies would bring about a change of regime in one way or another. Guerrilla groups redoubled their activity. In the AGLA, there were more than 200 guerrillas simultaneously during those years.

Antonio Gan, whose guerrilla alias would be ‘Cubano,’ (Note: The nickname Cubano could be due to his very dark complexion and thick beard: see also the comments already cited about his black hair and his gipsy-like appearance in G. Labrado (2002), pp. 95 and 96. There was another “Cubano” in the AGLA: Atilano Quintero Morales, “Tomás” or “El Cubano”, born on the island of El Hierro, who joined the guerrilla movement from France and was executed by firing squad in Paterna in August 1947.) did not appear in the maquis proper—the rural maquis—until February 1946, when Ángel Fuertes Vidosa “Antonio” (Note: Born in Agüero (Huesca) in 1912, he had been a guerrilla leader in France. He was commander-in-chief of the AGLA from May 1947 until his death in May 1948 in a confrontation in Portelle de Morella. Sánchez Cervelló, Josep (ed.): Maquis: el puño que golpeó al franquismo: la Agrupación Guerrillera de Levante y Aragón (AGLA), Barcelona, Flor del Viento, 2003, p. 435.) was appointed head of the AGL and arrived at the camp of ‘Delicado’ (Note: Juan Ramón Delicado González, born in Valencia. A member of the Guardia Civil at the start of the war, he sided with the Republican government and belonged to XIV Cuerpo de Ejército Guerrillero. He was executed by the guerrillas themselves in November 1946 and his burial place is unknown.) from Valencia: ‘After a few days [...], comrade “Antonio” arrived accompanied by comrade “Cubano” [...] Comrade “Cubano” stayed with us.’

In March, we once again have information about Antonio Gan's time in the ‘Medina’ and “Capitán” camps. (Note: Victoriano Anastasio Serrano ‘Capitán’, born in Villanueva de Perales (Madrid) in 1919. He volunteered at the age of 16 with El Campesino and fought in the French maquis against the Germans. He died in a confrontation with the Guardia Civil in 1949.) In early July 1946, he was, along with ‘Pepito el Gafas,’ (Note: Francisco Corredor Serrano, known as ‘Pepito el Gafas’ (Pepito the Spectacles), from Madrid, would later become head of the AGLA Guerrilla Training School. He was executed in France in 1950, according to most scholars, on the orders of the guerrilla movement itself.) ‘Grande,’ (Note: Florián García Velasco ‘Grande’ was born in 1917 in Aldeacorbo (Segovia). In May 1952, with the invaluable help of ‘Chaval,’ he led the retreat of the last 26 AGLA guerrillas to France. He died in Madrid in 2009.) ‘Antonio’ and others, to the ‘Ibáñez’ camp (Note: Doroteo Ibáñez Alconchel, born in Azuara (Zaragoza) in 1913; member of the maquis in France; handed over to Spain by the French government in 1952 and was executed by firing squad in Paterna in 1956.) to prepare one of the AGLA's most spectacular coups: the assault on the payroll train in Caudé, a few kilometres from Teruel, on 7 July; a coup worth 649,000 pesetas. José Manuel Montorio ‘Chaval’, (Note: Chaval was born in Borja (Zaragoza) in 1921; affiliated with the CNT, he moved to France at the end of the war and joined the communist maquis. He entered Spain in August 1945 to join the guerrilla group known as ‘Los Maños’. Together with Grande, he was responsible for the successful retreat to France in 1952. He died in 2009.)who recounted the assault in first person, said: ‘Cubano was supposed to participate in the operation, but he had to stay at the camp because he had developed some very bad furuncles that made it almost impossible for him to walk’.

In August of that same year, the AGL was formally established at the ‘Asamblea de Cuevas del Regajo’ in Camarena de la Sierra (Teruel). Three ‘sectors’ were created, and Grande was put in charge of the 11th sector, divided into two “units”: one led by Ibáñez and the other by Capitán. Antonio Gan was assigned to the latter and in December he took command of the ‘5th company’ of that unit. Their area of operation was the mountain range between Valencia and Cuenca, in the region of Los Serranos.

One of the maquis' favourite actions was to “take” a village, usually a very small one with no (or minimal) Guardia Civil garrison: they distributed propaganda, imposed “fines” on some authority figure and took hunting rifles or pistols. Following the guerrillas' ‘takeover’ of San Martín de Boniches on 19 September 1946, some 40 kilometres west of Santa Cruz de Moya, the Guardia Civil increased pressure on the area and located and raided a camp in Cabeza del Royo, near the ‘taken’ village. The following day, it had an encounter in Las Rinconadas – without too many consequences – with Antonio Gan's group as it crossed the Turia River via a bridge.

Shortly afterwards, one of the guerrilla actions most widely reported in the Francoist press took place: the ‘takeover’ of the small village of Losa del Obispo. At dusk on 26 January 1947, just over twenty men entered the village and surrounded the Guardia Civil barracks. During the assault, in which Cubano took part, the corporal and one of his sons were wounded, while his wife and another of his sons were killed. At the same time, four other guerrillas broke into a bar believing that the corporal would be there, but, disturbed by a movement made by one of the neighbours, they fired a series of shots, killing four people and wounding several others, two of whom later died. Obviously, this incident, with so many innocent deaths, was widely reported in the press.

On 15 February, Capitán and Cubano's groups “took” the village of Manzaneruela, located about five kilometres from Landete and Santa Cruz de Moya. On their way out, they stopped and set fire to a truck loaded with flour and tobacco. According to the statement by Manco de la Pesquera (Note: Basiliso Serrano Valero, known as ‘Manco de La Pesquera,’ was born in the village of Cuenca of the same name in 1908. He was a fugitive until February 1946, when he joined the AGLA. Arrested just before the final evacuation to France in April 1952, he was executed by firing squad in December 1955 in Paterna.) in summary 101-V-52, Antonio Gan had participated in the assault on the Tormeda rent in Salvacañete during those days in February.

We have a somewhat more personal account of Cubano's time with the anti-Franco maquis, that of “Manso”: (Note: Germán Amorrortu ‘Manso’, born in 1916 in Trucios (Biscay), took part in the operation in the Aran Valley. He returned to France in 1949.) 'According to reports, Cubano was the son of a wealthy man from Andalusia [...] He was an intelligent comrade, very friendly when he wasn't upset, and when it came to carrying out operations, he was extremely cool-headed, seeing no danger anywhere. As a result of these good qualities, all his comrades loved him dearly, as did the civilian population who got to know him, as his higher education was complemented by kindness and good manners." Some aspects of his character, such as his coolness and good manners, had already attracted attention during his time in Valencia. His recklessness would soon turn against him.

=== Fortune changes in Requena ===
The fortune that had accompanied Antonio Gan's audacity until then was about to turn its back on him. On 18 March 1947, a group of 20 men, led by Grande and made up of Capitán and Antonio Gan's groups, cut off the main road from Madrid at around four o'clock in the afternoon, some eight kilometres east of Requena, in Barranco Rubio. By chance, two Guardia Civil men were travelling in a truck, and after a shootout in which one guard was killed and the other wounded, Grande ordered the checkpoint to be dismantled:

'El Grande gave the order to withdraw to the groups involved in the incident, but the liaison who went to communicate this to Vargas's [Antonio Gan] group returned saying that they were continuing to maintain control because they were in charge of the situation.'

Alerted by the wounded guard, reinforcements from the Guardia Civil arrived from Requena and confronted the group that had remained behind, resulting in one guerrilla fighter dead and Antonio Gan wounded. The maquis managed to retreat, taking their wounded leader with them, but for Cubano, a painful search for shelter and healing began. Fidel Miota told Pascual Iranzo how, at that time, he worked on a farm that provided support to the maquis; it was the ‘Casa de Don Pedro’, in the municipality of Requena, about five kilometres from the village in the direction of Chera, to the north:

'On 18 March 1947, while working in a vineyard in the area known as Barranco Rubio, at around four o'clock in the afternoon, he began to see a large group of guerrillas on the Madrid-Valencia national road stopping all vehicles travelling along this route. After a while, he witnessed a shootout between them and the Guardia Civil [...] [At dusk] Once Fidel was back at the farm, he was telling the rest of the staff what had happened when the farm's shepherd arrived, accompanied by a wounded maqui, who asked to be treated, given a sandwich to eat and taken by horseback to a place he would specify. This guerrilla fighter was accompanied by Salvador Requena, the farm's tenant, and Fidel. After walking for a long time through the night, they arrived at Mari Luna, where the guerrilla fighter signalled with a torch, and a group of guerrillas quickly appeared and disappeared with the wounded man. (Note: Fidel Miota Ramírez was born in 1927 in Sinarcas.)

Later, Fidel recounted that Cubano appeared at the house walking on his own two feet, wearing corduroy trousers, a beret, a leather jacket and carrying a submachine gun, and that he remembers him as being tall and strong. The women in the house treated his wound below the waist, as blood was visible above his belt.

When they left with him following his instructions, he walked at first but then got on the mule. When they arrived at the ‘Casa de Mari Luna’ and after consulting something in a notebook, Antonio Gan signalled with a torch, after which six or seven guerrillas appeared and picked him up.

In 1945, Manuel Viana Marín, aged 14, had started working at Casa de Mari Luna and knew that in that property they helped the guerrillas. His memories are also recorded in Iranzo's book:

'One evening, a group of maquis arrived at the farmhouse with a wounded man, who was later treated and hidden in some bushes about 300 metres from the house.'

Manuel Viana later recounted that Antonio Gan was taken to the farmhouse at around 11 or 12 o'clock at night – from the 18th to the 19th – by several maquis. The elderly couple who ran the farmhouse treated his wound and he then accompanied them to hide him in some bushes not far from the house. Antonio could not move without help, and his wound was not on his leg, as other testimonies claim, but ‘in his private parts’.

'The morning after hiding the guerrilla fighter, the Guardia Civil arrived at the house and asked everyone there if they had seen any maquis in the area. […] That afternoon, almost at dusk, Manuel went to visit the wounded man and bring him food. He then told him that the Guardia Civil had been interrogating him that morning, but that he should rest assured, as he had not told them anything. Upon hearing Manuel's account, the wounded man was moved to tears, hugging him and thanking him for everything, asking him to please accept 200 pesetas as a token of his gratitude. That same night, the wounded man was picked up by his fellow guerrillas.'

Teófilo Gallega, in a documented study on AGLA in the Requena-Utiel region, states that the hiding place was the Santa Cruz Cave. Thus, in the early hours of the 19th to the 20th, Antonio was transferred for the third time. On this occasion, he was taken to the Casa del Valiente, (Note: The ‘Casa del Valiente’ was an important support point where Bernardo Martínez, his wife Bárbara Sánchez and their children lived. They were all arrested in April of that same year. Fernández Cava (2007), pp. 525–526) as Chaval resumes his account from that point in his memoirs:

'[Cubano] had to be carried away on our shoulders and hidden in the hills near Casa del Valiente, who took care of him until we came back for him. [...] Aware that there was a lot of movement around Casa del Valiente and fearing for the Cubano and the compromise this posed for our support point, Grande sent me with four or five guerrillas to look for him. We called at Casa del Valiente and one of the sons helped us with a mule to transport the Cubano to the Benagéber camp.'

Teo Gallega recounts that Bárbara Sánchez and her daughter Luisa went from Casa del Valiente to Mari Luna to treat the wounded man and that Francisco Navarro, the caretaker of the Casa del Valiente estate, took him there on a donkey. From there, another son of the tenants, Demetrio, later took him to the camp.

The route along which the maquis were hiding Cubano during those days follows the road from Requena to Chera (Note: It is currently the road CV-395.) in a north-easterly direction. La Casa de Don Pedro – now restored as a rural and wine tourism destination – is about five kilometres from Requena, slightly to the right of the road; from Barranco Rubio, the distance is also about four or five kilometres in a straight line. The Casa de Mari Luna is about four kilometres further on, at the foot of El Tejo peak, and its ruins are still standing. To get from there to the Casa del Valiente, you have to cross to the other side of the road, heading north-northwest, and travel another five kilometres. Fernández Cava accurately locates the camp in Benagéber where he was finally taken: ‘...An hour from Casa de la Olivera de Nieva, towards Sinarcas, in La Pardala’ (about 20 kilometres from Casa del Valiente and two or three kilometres west of Benagéber).

But the wound was not healing, which led to a decision that would precipitate the final outcome:

'The conditions at the camp did not allow for effective treatment, so it was decided to install him in the hayloft of a strong guerrilla support point in the village of Nieva, known as Casa de Paquita, owned by Santiago Martínez and Paquita Montes.'

To cure Cubano, it was decided that another maquis, Manuel Torres Hervás ‘Practicante’, (Note: Born in Vilches (Jaén) and a barber by profession, he enlisted in the Navy where, during the War, he took a course to become a medic. The ship he was on, the destroyer Escaño, docked in Bizerte (Tunisia) at the end of the War. From there, Manuel returned to Spain, escaped from the construction site of the Valle de los Caídos and joined the guerrilla forces.) would hide with him. In the early hours of Monday 24 March to Tuesday 25 March, both guerrillas were installed in the hayloft of Casa Paquita.

=== Death in Benagéber ===
The village of Benagéber, as it existed at the time of this story, was submerged in 1955 in the reservoir of the same name, under the waters of the Turia River. About seven kilometres to the south, and about 200 metres higher in altitude, the village of Nieva, with its chapel and cemetery, was spared from the flood. Today, this is precisely where the village that bears the name of Benagéber is located, with barely 200 residents. The surrounding area is densely wooded, as it was at the time.

After a local guard reported the guerrillas' hiding place, at 6 a.m. on 25 March, the Guardia Civil surrounded Paquita's house. José, Santiago Martínez's seven-year-old son, saw Antonio Gan being machine-gunned as he lay on the stretcher on which he had been brought the night before:

‘On the night of 24 March,’ recalls José Martínez, ‘Grande and El Practicante came to our house and told my father that he had to hide an injured man [...] The next morning, I was playing in the street when I saw more than 100 officers [from Guardia Civil] begin to surround the house.’ José ran inside and warned his mother, who, with the help of Practicante, had time to hide the wounded man, who could not walk, in a reed room outside the house ‘because if they had found him inside, they would have killed us all’ [...]. José recalls that when they found Cubano, ‘they put my 3-year-old brother and me against a mattress, and then they riddled him with bullets from a submachine gun.’ He was unarmed and unable to move. Then he also saw the body of Practicante, who had tried to flee in vain, riddled with bullets.

In any case, according to the Benagéber Town Hall death register, both were shot in the head. Antonio Gan was 29 years old, and his early death spared him from experiencing the years of much harsher repression, reprisals, and the end of the communist guerrilla war in 1952. Less than a month after his death, on 18 April, Franco issued the decree-law on military rebellion, banditry and terrorism, which gave carte blanche to the unrestrained repression of the guerrilla movement.

Paquita and her husband were arrested and tortured; he, Santiago Martínez Montes, (Note: Born in Benagéber in 1907, labourer, married with three children) was subjected to the ‘ley de fugas’. Several workers from the nearby dam under construction, who were part of the network supporting the maquis, were also arrested; two of them, Clemente Alcorisa (Note: Born in Higueruelas, a village in Santa Cruz de Moya (Cuenca) in 1902. A bricklayer by occupation, married with five children.) and Salvador Garrido, (Note: Born in Landete (Cuenca), a cowherd from the reservoir colony, married with five children.) were also subjected to the ‘ley de fugas’. Finally, as the operation came to a close, on the night of 25–26 May, the Guardia Civil raided the guerrilla camp at Valdesierra, in Alto de la Bandera, perhaps using several of the detainees as human shields, including Juan Luján Cerdán (Note: Born in Enguidanos (Cuenca) in 1915, labourer, married with one child.) and José Martínez Viana, (Note: Born in Chelva (Valencia) in 1916, carpenter) who were killed. The guerrilla fighter Daniel Cortés Luján ‘Vaquero’ also died in the raid. (Note: Born in Buñol (Valencia) in 1923, he joined the maquis just a couple of months before) In total, as a result of Antonio Gan's discovery, there were eight deaths. The bodies were buried a few days later in four graves (two bodies in each) in the Benagéber cemetery, without gravestones or any identification, so that until their exhumation in 2010, their exact location was unknown.

The eight buried were recorded in volume 17 of the town's death register on 5 April 1947, listed as unknown and deceased ‘from gunshot wounds’ with a date of death of 26 March. Subsequently, in 1948 and 1949, the identities of all but one were recorded in the book. The body corresponding to Antonio Gan Vargas is attributed to Manuel Prieto Domínguez (the false identity he carried in the documentation found by the Guardia Civil). It appears on page 34, number 11, literally as follows:

'Unknown. Distinguishing features: oval face; aquiline nose, very large; large mouth; full lips; black eyes and hair; trimmed moustache, same colour; aged 30 to 35; approximate height 1,700 mm.

He was wearing a black corduroy suit and espadrilles [...]

He died [...] as a result of a gunshot wound caused by a skull fracture [sic]'.

=== Epilogue: sixty-three years later ===
The victims' relatives and the association La Gavilla Verde (Santa Cruz de Moya, Cuenca) promoted the exhumation and, in June 2009, the municipality of Benagéber, with a government grant to proceed with the opening of the graves, published an announcement authorising it. On 1 March 2010, the exhumation was carried out by the specialised team from Paleolab (Valencia). On 20 November, 63 years after the deaths, the team of forensic scientists and archaeologists from Paleolab handed over the remains to the relatives, who proceeded to give them a dignified burial. The reports drawn up by Paleolab confirm the death by homicide and the irregular burial of seven of the eight victims. Seven of the eight also show a gunshot wound to the skull, in most cases with the bullet trajectory from back to front and from top to bottom.

== In fiction ==
Marilar Aleixandre has fictionalized Antonio's life in her novel As bocas cosidas, Editorial Galaxia, 2025.
