= Mezen =

Mezen may refer to:

Places

- Mezen (river), a river in the Komi Republic and Arkhangelsk Oblast, Russia
- Mezen Bay, a bay of the White Sea in Russia
- Mezen (inhabited locality), several inhabited localities in Russia
- Mezen Airport, an airport in Arkhangelsk Oblast, Russia
- Mezen Basin, a sedimentary basin in northern European Russia

People

== See also ==
- Mézens, a commune in the Tarn Department in France
- Mezensky (disambiguation)
