= Pyoza =

Pyoza Russian: Пёза

Location
- Country: Russia

Physical characteristics
- Mouth: Mezen
  - coordinates: 65°35′59″N 44°36′34″E
- Length: 363 km (226 mi)
- Basin size: 15,100 km^{2} (5,800 sq mi)
- Discharge
  - average: 130 cubic metres per second (4,600 cu ft/s)

Basin features
- Progression: Mezen→ White Sea

The river basin of the Mezen. The Pyoza is shown.

The Pyoza (Russian: Пёза) is a river in Mezensky District of Arkhangelsk Oblast in Russia. It is a right tributary of the Mezen. It is 363 kilometres (226 mi) long, and the area of its basin 15,100 square kilometres (5,800 sq mi). The main tributaries of the Pyoza are the Tsema (left), Varchushka (right), the Chetsa (left), and the Loftura (right).

The river basin of the Pyoza includes the eastern part of Mezensky District, as well as some areas in Leshukonsky District, Nenets Autonomous Okrug, and Ust-Tsilemsky District of the Komi Republic. It is sparsely populated and includes a big number of lakes, the largest of which are Lake Varsh, Lake Pocha, and Lake Vyzhletskoye.

The source of the Pyoza is located on the east of Mezensky District. The Pyoza originates from the confluence of the Rochuga and the Bludnaya and flows west. The mouth of the Pyoza is almost opposite to the mouth of the Kimzha, a left tributary of the Mezen.

The valley of the Pyoza is populated, with the biggest settlements being the villages of Safonovo, Moseyevo, and Bychye. Bychye is located by a road with the selo of Dorogorskoye, and further with Mezen, Leshukonskoye, and Arkhangelsk. In Moseyevo and Safonovo, the air connections are the only means of transportation.

Almost the whole course of the Pyoza, 301 kilometres (187 mi) downstream from the village of Safonovo, is navigable, however, there is no passenger navigation.
