= Kimzha =

Kimzha may refer to:

- Kimzha (river), a river in Arkhangelsk Oblast, Russia
- Kimzha (rural locality), a rural locality (a village) in Mezensky District of Arkhangelsk Oblast, Russia
