= Mezensky =

Mezensky (masculine), Mezenskaya (feminine), or Mezenskoye (neuter) may refer to:

- Mezensky District, a district of Arkhangelsk Oblast
- Mezensky Uyezd, an administrative division in the Russian Empire and the early Russian SFSR; most recently (1922–1929) a part of Arkhangelsk Governorate
- Mezenskoye Urban Settlement, a municipal formation which the town of Mezen and five rural localities in Mezensky District of Arkhangelsk Oblast, Russia are incorporated as
- Mezensky (inhabited locality) (Mezenskaya, Mezenskoye), several rural localities in Russia
