= Kamenka, Mezensky District, Arkhangelsk Oblast =

Kamenka Каменка
- Settlement
- Interactive map of Kamenka
- Location of Kamenka Kamenka (Arkhangelsk Oblast)
- Coordinates: 65°53′30″N 44°07′13″E
- Country: Russia
- Federal subject: Arkhangelsk Oblast
- Administrative district: Mezensky District
- Founded: 1882
- Elevation: 8 m (26 ft)

Population (2010 Census)
  - Total: 2,582
  - Estimate (2021): 1,847 (−28.5%)

Municipal status
  - Municipal district: Mezensky Municipal District
  - Urban settlement: Kamenskoye Rural Settlement
  - Capital of: Kamenskoye Rural Settlement
- Time zone: UTC+3 (MSK)
- Postal code: 164762
- OKTMO ID: 11642157051

Kamenka (Russian: Ка́менка) is a rural locality (a settlement) in Mezensky District of Arkhangelsk Oblast, Russia, located on the left bank of the Mezen River at the mouth of the Kamenka River (hence the name of the settlement), some 10 kilometers (6.2 mi) northwest of Mezen. Municipally, it is the administrative center of Kamenskoye Urban Settlement, one of the two urban settlements in Mezensky Municipal District. Population: 2,582 (2010 census); 3,387 (2002 census); 5,083 (1989 Soviet census).

== History ==
In 1882, a sawmill was built in the mouth of the Kamenka River by the Rushnikov brothers. There was timber rafting on the Mezen, which persisted until the 1990s. Kamenka was one of the places where the logs were lifted from the water. The sawmill produced boards, all of which were exported. At the time, it was part of Mezensky Uyezd of Arkhangelsk Governorate. On July 15, 1929 the uyezds were abolished, and Mezensky District was established. Kamenka was granted urban-type settlement status in 1938. On 23 June 2021, Kamenka was transformed back to rural settlement. Economy-related legal and tax reasons were cited for this decision.

== Restricted access ==
The northern part of Mezensky District, including Kamenka, is included into the border security zone, intended to protect the borders of Russian Federation from unwanted activity. In order to visit Kamenka, a permit issued by the local FSB department is required.

== Economy ==
=== Industry ===
The two most important enterprises in Kamenka are the Mezen sawmill and the Mezen sea harbor.

=== Transportation ===
There is an airport in Kamenka.

The Mezen is navigable in Kamenka; however, the passenger navigation is only represented by ferries to Mezen, which connect Kamenka to the road network. There is also a winter road (zimnik) downstream the Mezen, which crosses into the valley of the Kuloy River and ends in the selo of Dolgoshchelye.
