= Kyma (river) =

- Native name: Кыма (Russian)

Location
- Country: Russia

Physical characteristics
- Mouth: Mezen
  - coordinates: 64°50′29″N 47°31′14″E
- Length: 219 km (136 mi)
- Basin size: 2,630 km^{2} (1,020 sq mi)

Basin features
- Progression: Mezen→ White Sea

The river basin of the Mezen. The Kyma is shown.

The Kyma (Russian: Кыма) is a river in Leshukonsky District of Arkhangelsk Oblast in Russia. It is a right tributary of the Mezen. It is 219 kilometres (136 mi) long, and the area of its basin 2,630 square kilometres (1,020 sq mi). The main tributaries of the Kyma are the Cholus (left), the Sezya (left), the Lopiya (right), and the Bolshaya Vizenga (left).

The river basin of the Kyma comprises vast areas in the eastern part of Leshukonsky District, as well as some areas in the south-eastern part of Mezensky District. The source of the Kuma is located in the Timan Ridge, close to the border with the Komi Republic and also close to the source of the Sula, another major tributary of the Mezen. The Kyma initially flows in the north-western direction and eventually turns south-west, flowing through the hilly landscape.

The valley of the Kyma is essentially unpopulated. There is a village of Zhitel in the lower course, and the villages of Chukhari and Ust-Kyma in the mouth of the river.
