= Lake Varsh =

Russian lake

- Oзеро Варш (Russian)
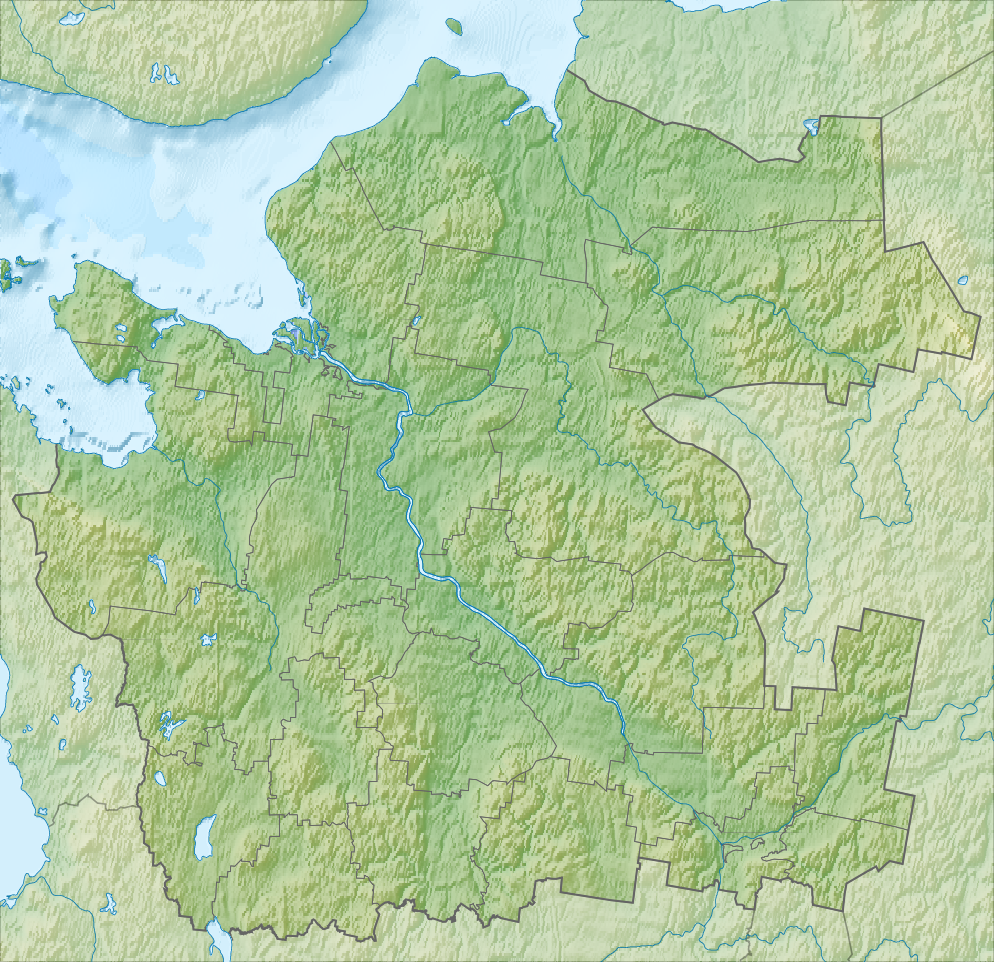
- Location within Arkhangelsk Oblast
- Location: Arkhangelsk Oblast
- Coordinates: 66°01′N 48°00′E
- Primary inflows: Pochviska
- Primary outflows: Varchushka
- Catchment area: 428 square kilometres (165 mi^{2})
- Basin countries: Russia
- Surface area: 44.2 square kilometres (17.1 mi^{2})

Lake Varsh (Russian: озеро Варш) is a freshwater lake, shared by Mezensky District of Arkhangelsk Oblast and the Nenets Autonomous Okrug in Russia, just below the Arctic Circle. It is one of the biggest lakes in Arkhangelsk Oblast and the biggest one in Mezensky District. The area of the lake is 44.2 square kilometres (17.1 mi^{2}), and the area of its basin is 428 square kilometres (165 mi^{2}).

Lake Varsh is the biggest of the system of glacial lakes at the border between Arkhangelsk Oblast and the Nenets Autonomous Okrug at the western edge of the Timan Ridge. The system also includes Lake Pocha (which drains into Lake Varsh via the Pochviska), Lake Bormat and Lake Zhadobo (which both drain into Lake Varsh), Lake Koras and Lake Atyozero (both drain into the Varchushka) and others. The whole system of the lakes drains into the Varchushka River, a right tributary of the Pyoza, and thus belongs to the drainage basin of the Mezen and the basin of the White Sea.

The lake consists of two round bays (one on the northern side, another on the southern side) of approximately the same area, connected in the middle by a straight; the border between Arkhangelsk Oblast and the Nenets Autonomous Okrug crosses the southern bay west to east, so that the major part of the lake belongs to the Nenets Autonomous Okrug.

Lake Varsh is surrounded by coniferous forest (taiga), almost all of the shore is occupied by swamps. The lake and immediate vicinities of the lake are not populated, The nearest settlement is the village of Safonovo on the Pyoza, several dozens kilometers south-west from the lake. Lake Varsh is popular for fishing.
