= Pogorelets =

Pogorelets Погорелец
- Village
- Location within Arkhangelsk Oblast Location within Russia
- Coordinates: 65°25′N 45°03′E
- Country: Russia
- Region: Arkhangelsk Oblast
- District: Mezensky District
- Time zone: UTC+3:00

Pogorelets (Russian: Погорелец) is a rural locality (a village) in Kozmogorodskoye Rural Settlement of Mezensky District, Arkhangelsk Oblast, Russia. The population was 32 as of 2010. There are 4 streets.

== Geography ==
Pogorelets is located on the Mezen River, 71 km southeast of Mezen (the district's administrative centre) by road. Bereznik is the nearest rural locality.
