= Ezevets =

Ezevets Езевец
- Village
- Location within Arkhangelsk Oblast Location within Russia
- Coordinates: 65°42′N 46°31′E
- Country: Russia
- Region: Arkhangelsk Oblast
- District: Mezensky District
- Time zone: UTC+3:00

Ezevets (Russian: Езевец) is a rural locality (a village) in Moseyevskoye Rural Settlement of Mezensky District, Arkhangelsk Oblast, Russia. The population was 41 as of 2010.

== Geography ==
Ezevets is located on the Pyoza River, 68 km east of Mezen (the district's administrative centre) by road.
