= Leshukonsky =

Leshukonsky (masculine), Leshukonskaya (feminine), or Leshukonskoye (neuter) may refer to:

- Leshukonsky District, a district of Arkhangelsk Oblast, Russia
- Leshukonskoye, a rural locality (a selo) Arkhangelsk Oblast, Russia
