= Keba (village) =

Keba Кеба
- Village
- Location within Arkhangelsk Oblast Location within Russia
- Coordinates: 64°21′N 46°12′E
- Country: Russia
- Region: Arkhangelsk Oblast
- District: Leshukonsky District
- Time zone: UTC+3:00

Keba (Russian: Кеба) is a rural locality (a village) in Olemskoye Rural Settlement of Leshukonsky District, Arkhangelsk Oblast, Russia. The population was 131 as of 2010.

== Geography ==
Keba is located 85 km south of Leshukonskoye (the district's administrative centre) by road. Butyrka is the nearest rural locality.
