= Lampozhnya =

Lampozhnya Лампожня
- Village
- Location within Arkhangelsk Oblast Location within Russia
- Coordinates: 65°41′N 44°19′E
- Country: Russia
- Region: Arkhangelsk Oblast
- District: Mezensky District
- Time zone: UTC+3:00

Lampozhnya (Russian: Ла́мпожня) is a rural locality (a village) in Mezenskoye Rural Settlement of Mezensky District, Arkhangelsk Oblast, Russia. The population was 97 as of 2010. There is 1 street.

== Geography ==
Lampozhnya is located on the Mezen River, 23 km south of Mezen (the district's administrative centre) by road. Zaton is the nearest rural locality.
