= Kimzha (river) =

Kimzha Russian: Кимжа
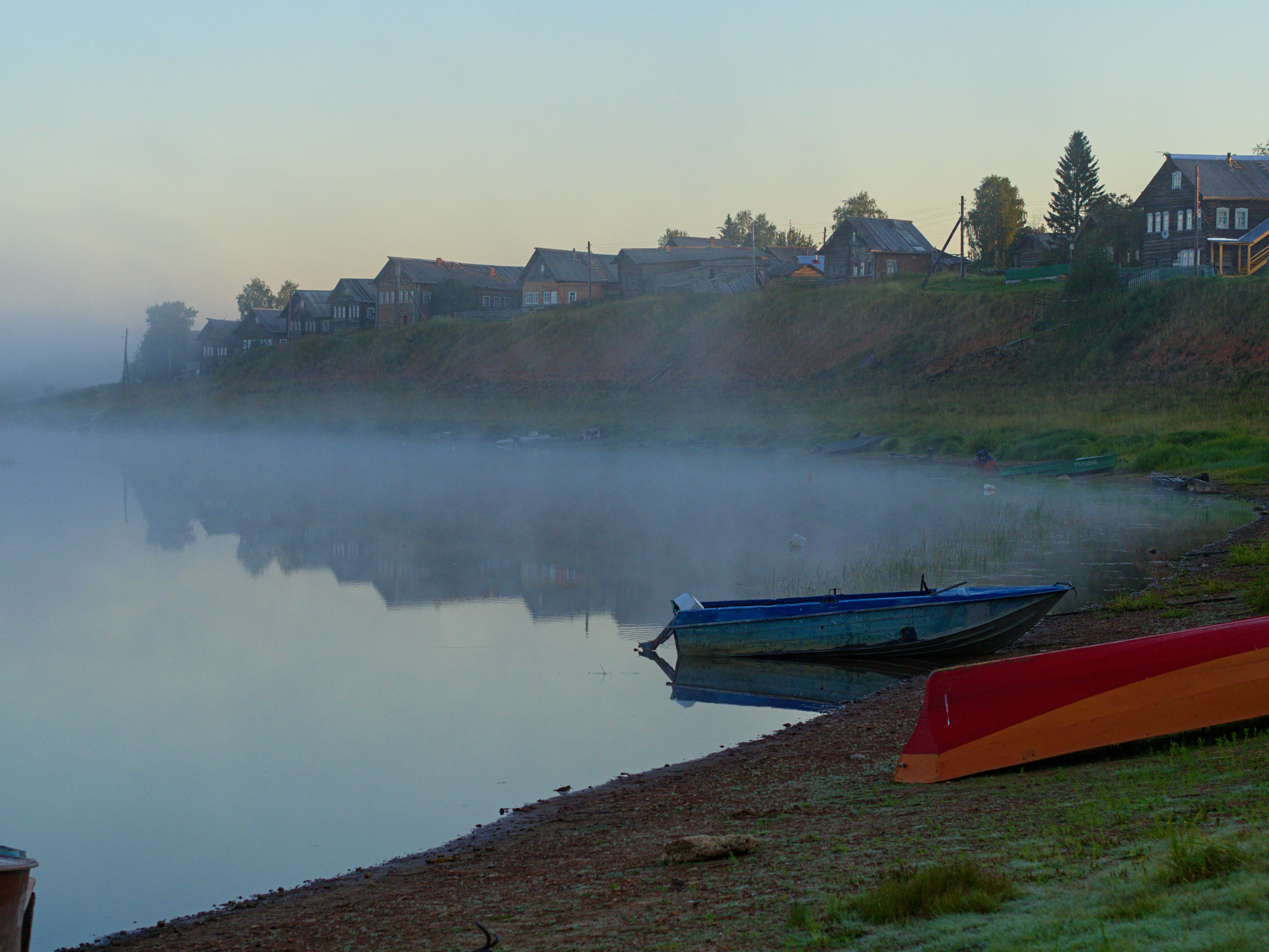

Location
- Country: Russia

Physical characteristics
- Mouth: Mezen
  - coordinates: 65°35′15″N 44°31′15″E
- Length: 158 km (98 mi)
- Basin size: 1,490 km^{2} (580 sq mi)

Basin features
- Progression: Mezen→ White Sea

The river basin of the Mezen. The Kimzha is shown.

The Kimzha (Russian: Кимжа) is a river in Leshukonsky and Mezensky Districts of Arkhangelsk Oblast in Russia. It is a left tributary of the Mezen. It is 158 kilometres (98 mi) long, and the area of its basin 1,490 square kilometres (580 sq mi). The main tributary is the Tyafsora (right).

The river basin of the Kimzha comprises a strip elongated from the south to the north and located between the basins of the Mezen and the Nemnyuga. The source of the Kimzha is in the north-western part of Leshukonsky District, north of lake Yamozero and some 50 kilometres (31 mi) west of the selo of Leshukonskoye, the administrative center of the district. The river flows in the general direction north. The Kimzha meanders, forming many lakes. The mouth of the Kimzha is several kilometers downstream from the selo of Kimzha and is approximately opposite to the mouth of the Pyoza, a right tributary of the Mezen.

The river valley is not populated except for the selo of Kimzha close to the river mouth. Several kilometers upstream, the Kimzha is crossed by a bridge, over which the road connecting Arkhangelsk and Mezen runs.
