= Mezen (inhabited locality) =

Mezen (Russian: Мезень) is the name of several inhabited localities in Russia.

Urban localities

- Mezen, Mezensky District, Arkhangelsk Oblast, a town in Mezensky District of Arkhangelsk Oblast; administratively incorporated as a town of district significance

Rural localities

- Mezen, Plesetsky District, Arkhangelsk Oblast, a village in Undozersky Selsoviet of Plesetsky District of Arkhangelsk Oblast
- Mezen, Belokholunitsky District, Kirov Oblast, a village in Polomsky Rural Okrug of Belokholunitsky District of Kirov Oblast
- Mezen, Nolinsky District, Kirov Oblast, a village in Ludyansky Rural Okrug of Nolinsky District of Kirov Oblast
