= ULAE =

ULAE may refer to:

- L-ribulose-5-phosphate 3-epimerase, an enzyme
- Mezen Airport, Mezen, Mezensky District, Arkhangelsk Oblast, Russia (ICAO code)
- Universal Limited Art Editions (U.L.A.E.), a prominent print workshop founded by Tatyana Grosman
