= Mezenskaya Pizhma =

Mezenskaya Pizhma Russian: Мезенская Пижма

Location
- Country: Russia

Physical characteristics
- Mouth: Mezen
  - coordinates: 64°30′31″N 48°32′01″E
- Length: 236 km (147 mi)
- Basin size: 3,830 km^{2} (1,480 sq mi)
- Discharge
  - average: 41.9 cubic metres per second (1,480 cu ft/s)

Basin features
- Progression: Mezen→ White Sea

The river basin of the Mezen. The Mezenskaya Pizhma is shown.

The Mezenskaya Pizhma (Russian: Мезенская Пижма) is a river in Ust-Tsilemsky District of the Komi Republic and in Leshukonsky District of Arkhangelsk Oblast in Russia. It is a right tributary of the Mezen. It is 236 kilometres (147 mi) long, and the area of its basin 3,830 square kilometres (1,480 sq mi). The major tributaries of the Mezenskaya Pizhma are the Chetlas and the Shegmas (both left).

The Mezenskaya Pizhma starts in the Komi Republic, west of Lake Yamozero, close to the border with Arkhangelsk Oblast, on the Chatlassky Kamen Plateau, part of the Timan Ridge. It generally flows in the western direction. The Pizhma, flowing out of Lake Yamozero, runs to the east in the Pechora, and the name Mezenskaya Pizhma means literally "The Pizhma which belongs to the Mezen".

The river flows in one of the most remote areas of Arkhangelsk Oblast. The upper course of the Mezenskaya Pizhma is not populated, and in the whole valley of the river there are only three villages: Shegmas, upstream from the confluence of the Shegmas River, Larkino, and Rodoma in the mouth. The lower stretch of the river, 73 kilometres (45 mi) downstream from the village of Shegmas, is navigable, but there is no passenger navigation.
