= Leshukonsky District =

Leshukonsky District Лешуконский район (Russian)
- District
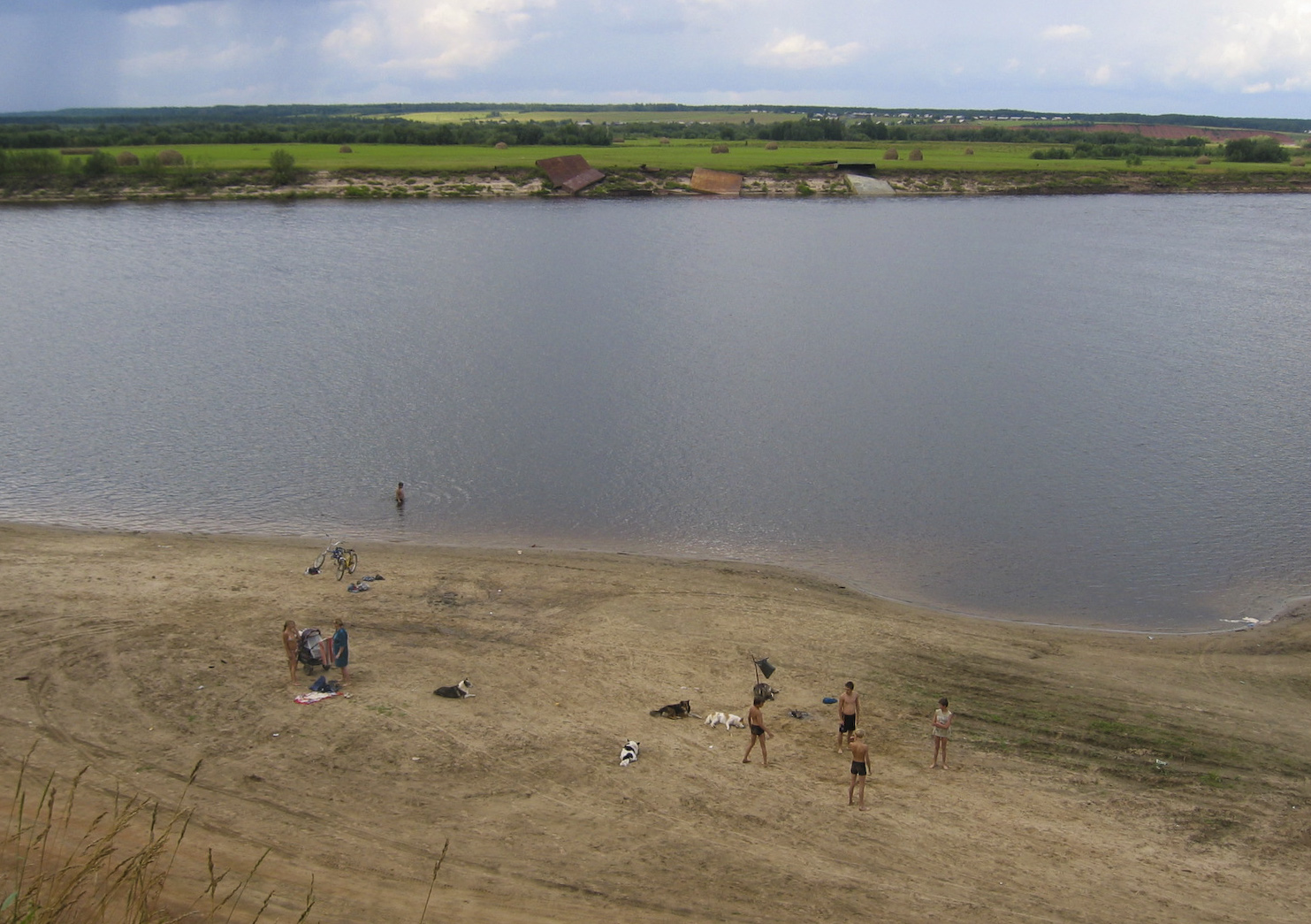
- Riverbank scene, Leshukonsky District

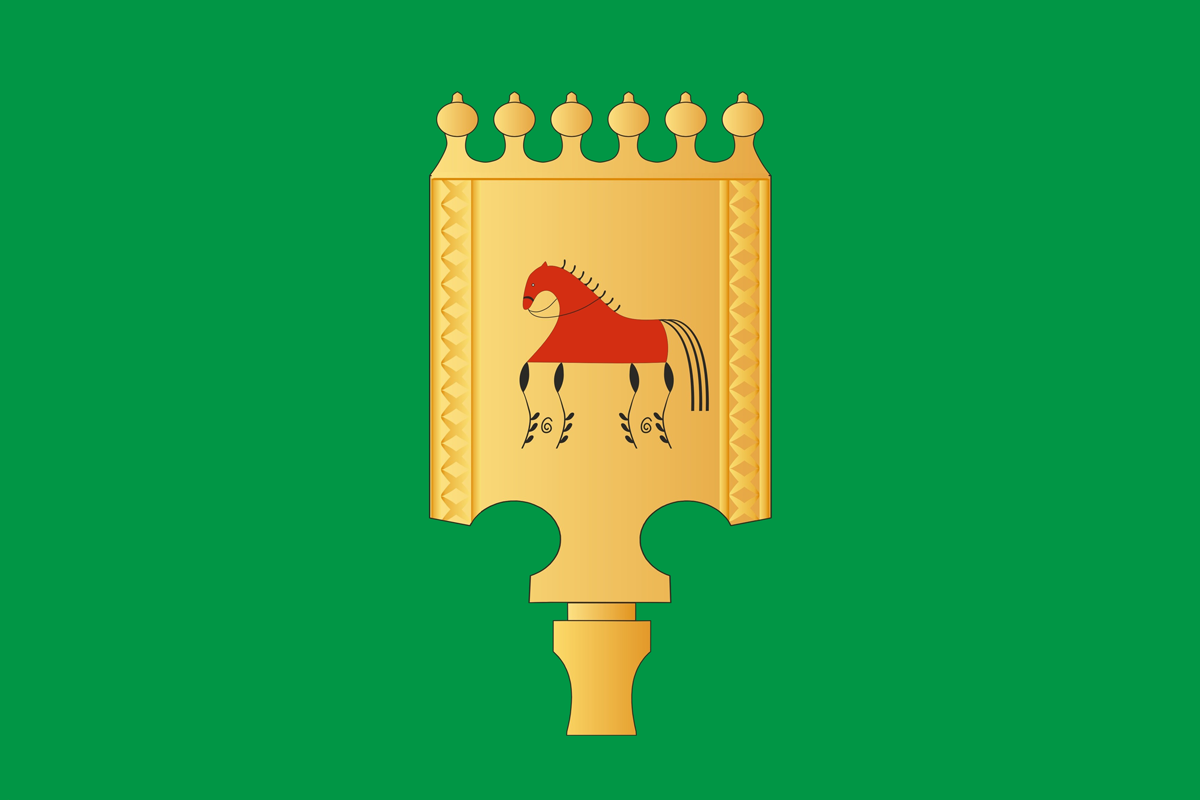
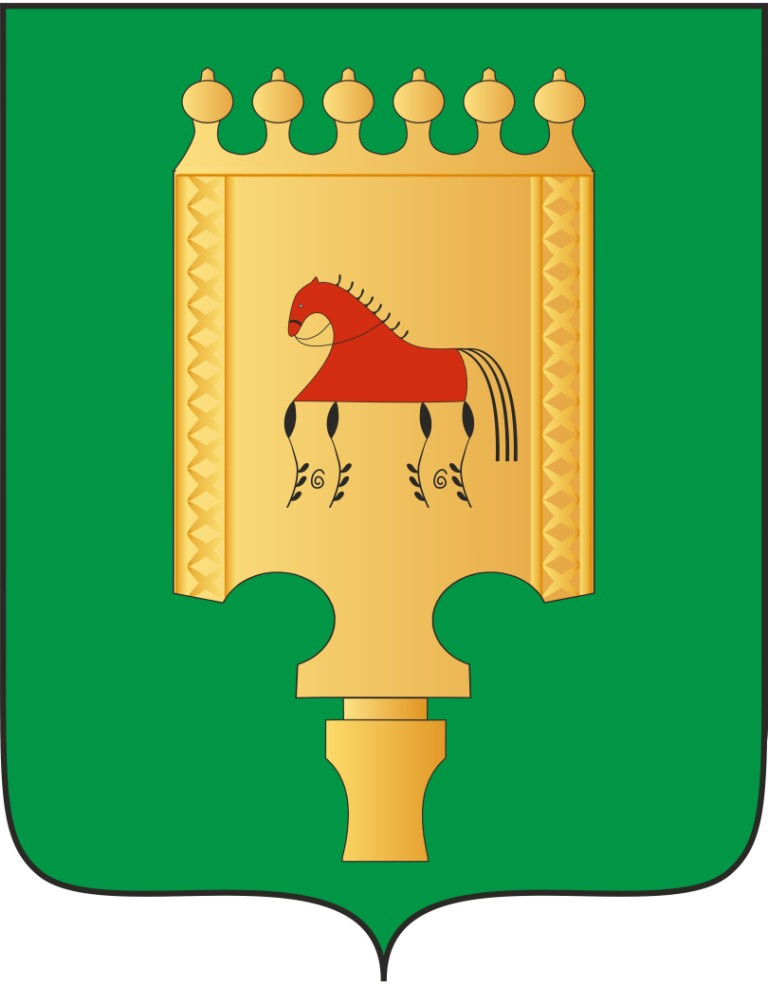
- Flag Coat of arms
- Location of Leshukonsky District in Arkhangelsk Oblast
- Coordinates: 64°54′N 45°46′E
- Country: Russia
- Federal subject: Arkhangelsk Oblast
- Established: July 15, 1929
- Administrative center: Leshukonskoye

Area
  - Total: 28,100 km^{2} (10,800 sq mi)

Population (2010 Census)
  - Total: 7,979
  - Density: 0.284/km^{2} (0.735/sq mi)
  - Urban: 0%
  - Rural: 100%

Administrative structure
  - Administrative divisions: 7 selsoviet
  - Inhabited localities: 47 rural localities

Municipal structure
  - Municipally incorporated as: Leshukonsky Municipal District
  - Municipal divisions: 0 urban settlements, 6 rural settlements
- Time zone: UTC+3 (MSK)
- OKTMO ID: 11638000
- Website: http://www.leshukonia.ru/

Leshukonsky District (Russian: Лешуко́нский райо́н) is an administrative district (raion), one of the twenty-one in Arkhangelsk Oblast, Russia. Municipally, it is incorporated as Leshukonsky Municipal District. It is located in the northeast of the oblast and borders with Mezensky District in the north, Ust-Tsilemsky District of the Komi Republic in the east, Udorsky District of the Komi Republic in the south, and with Pinezhsky District in the west. Its administrative center is the rural locality (a selo) of Leshukonskoye. District's population: 7,979 (2010 census); 10,708 (2002 census); 15,488 (1989 Soviet census). The population of Leshukonskoye accounts for 55.2% of the district's population.

== History ==
The area was populated by speakers of Uralic languages and then colonized by the Novgorod Republic. After the fall of Novgorod, the area became a part of the Grand Duchy of Moscow. First Russian settlements on the Mezen River were mentioned in the 16th century: Yuroma (1513) and Koynas (1554). The middle course of the Mezen, the current area of the district, was where Russian and Komi cultures mixed the most.

In the course of the administrative reform carried out in 1708 by Peter the Great, the area was included into Archangelgorod Governorate. In 1780, the governorate was abolished and transformed into Vologda Viceroyalty. In 1796, the area was transferred to Arkhangelsk Governorate. The current territory of the district was included into Mezensky Uyezd. On December 28, 1917, a new Ust-Vashsky Uyezd with the administrative center in Ust-Vashka (currently Leshukonskoye) was established; however, in 1925 it was merged back into Mezensky Uyezd.

In 1929, several governorates were merged into Northern Krai. On July 15, 1929, the uyezds were abolished, and Leshukonsky District was established. It became a part of Arkhangelsk Okrug of Northern Krai. In the following years, the first-level administrative division of Russia kept changing. In 1930, the okrug was abolished, and the district was subordinated to the central administration of Northern Krai. In 1936, the krai itself was transformed into Northern Oblast. In 1937, Northern Oblast was split into Arkhangelsk Oblast and Vologda Oblast. Leshukonsky District remained in Arkhangelsk Oblast ever since.

== Geography ==
The district lies almost entirely in the basin of the Mezen River, which crosses the district from southeast to northwest, and of its major tributaries, the Mezenskaya Pizhma, the Sula, the Kyma, the Vashka, the Kimzha, and, in the northern part, the Pyoza. Minor areas in the west of the district lie in the basin of the Yezhuga River, a tributary of the Pinega, and into the Nemnyuga River, a tributary of the Kuloy. Some areas in the east of the district are in the basin of the major tributaries of the Pechora, the Tsilma, and the Pizhma. In particular, the source of the Tsilma River is located in the district. The divide between the White Sea (the Mezen) and the Barents Sea (the Pechora) runs thus through the eastern part of the district.

The northern part of the Timan Ridge lies in the district, creating the hilly landscape. Almost the whole of the district is covered by coniferous forests (taiga). There are many glacial lakes across the district.

== Divisions ==
=== Administrative divisions ===
Administratively, the district is divided into seven selsoviets. The following selsoviets have been established (the administrative centers are given in parentheses):

- Leshukonsky (Leshukonskoye)
- Nisogorsky (Zaruchey)
- Olemsky (Olema)
- Suksky (Koynas)
- Tsenogorsky (Tsenogora)
- Vozhgorsky (Vozhgora)
- Yuromsky (Yuroma)

=== Municipal divisions ===
Municipally, the district is divided into six rural settlements (the administrative centers are given in parentheses):

- Koynasskoye Rural Settlement (Koynas)
- Leshukonskoye Rural Settlement (Leshukonskoye)
- Olemskoye Rural Settlement (Olema)
- Tsenogorskoye Rural Settlement (Tsenogora)
- Vozhgorskoye Rural Settlement (Vozhgora)
- Yuromskoye Rural Settlement (Yuroma)

== Economy ==
=== Industry ===
The backbone of the district's economy is the timber industry. However, although the district has the best timber resources in the area, poor infrastructure impedes the expansion of this industry.

=== Agriculture ===
The special breed of horses, Mezen horse, was bred in the Mezen River valley. The Mezen horses are rather small but suitable for difficult work and easily survive cold winters.

=== Transportation ===
The Mezen and the Vashka Rivers are both navigable within the district limits; however, there is no passenger navigation in Leshukonsky District except for the ferry crossing between Leshukonskoye and the village of Smolenets. The ferry connects to the all-seasonal road to Arkhangelsk. Until 2008, there were no all-seasonal roads in the district. During winter, temporary roads (zimniks) are built in snow; in summer, the air transport is the only means for passenger connections to Arkhangelsk and the rest of the world.

There is an airport in Leshukonskoye, with several weekly flights to Arkhangelsk. There are also three minor airports in Koynas, Olema, and Vozhgora.

== Demographics ==
In terms of population, the largest inhabited localities are Vozhgora and Leshukonskoye. The unemployment rate in October 2010 was 5.4%.

== Politics ==
The local representative body is the Assembly of Deputies of Leshukonsky District. It has seventeen elected members. Its chairperson is Tatyana Stukalova. The head of the municipal administration is Alexander Martynov.

== Culture and recreation ==
The district contains three objects classified as cultural and historical heritage by the Russian Federal law, and additionally thirty-nine objects classified as cultural and historical heritage of local importance. Most of these are wooden churches and wooden rural houses built prior to 1917. The objects under federal protection are the St. Nicholas Church (1890), the Klokotov House (1879), and the wooden cross, all in the village of Zaozerye (also known as Kelchemgora). The Klokotov House was moved in 2004 to the Malye Korely open-air museum close to Arkhangelsk. The cross is also located in the same museum.

The only state museum in the district is the Leshukonsky Museum, located in the selo of Leshukonskoye.
