= Bychye =

Bychye Бычье
- Village
- Interactive map of Bychye
- Location within Arkhangelsk Oblast Location within Russia
- Coordinates: 65°47′N 45°03′E
- Country: Russia
- Region: Arkhangelsk Oblast
- District: Mezensky District
- Time zone: UTC+3:00

Bychye (Russian: Бычье) is a rural locality (a village) and the administrative center of Bychenskoye Rural Settlement of Mezensky District, Arkhangelsk Oblast, Russia. The population was 131 as of 2010. There are 14 streets.

== Geography ==
Bychye is located 68 km southeast of Mezen (the district's administrative centre) by road. Ust-Nyafta is the nearest rural locality.
