= Sula (Mezen) =

Sula Russian: Сула

Location
- Country: Russia

Physical characteristics
- Mouth: Mezen
  - coordinates: 64°41′29″N 47°47′23″E
- Length: 221 km (137 mi)
- Basin size: 2,210 km^{2} (850 sq mi)
- Discharge
  - average: 13 m^{3}/s (460 cu ft/s)

Basin features
- Progression: Mezen→ White Sea

The river basin of the Mezen. The Sula is shown.

The Sula (Russian: Сула) is a river in Leshukonsky District of Arkhangelsk Oblast in Russia. It is a right tributary of the Mezen. It is 221 kilometres (137 mi) long, and the area of its basin 2,210 square kilometres (850 sq mi). The major tributaries of the Sula are the Pyshega and the Omza (both left).

The Sula starts on the Kozminsky Kamen Plateau, part of the Timan Ridge. It generally flows in the south-western direction.

The valley of the Sula is one of the most remote areas of Arkhangelsk Oblast. There are no settlements on the river, except for the village of Zasulye in the mouth of the Sula. There are several wooden houses, located all over the river course and used by seasonal hunters. In the middle course of the Sula, a road runs parallel to the river. This road connects the Mezen valley (the village of Ust-Kyma) with the Pechora valley (the village of Ust-Tsilma) and is not passable for ordinary cars.
