= San Martín de Boniches =

San Martín de Boniches, Spain
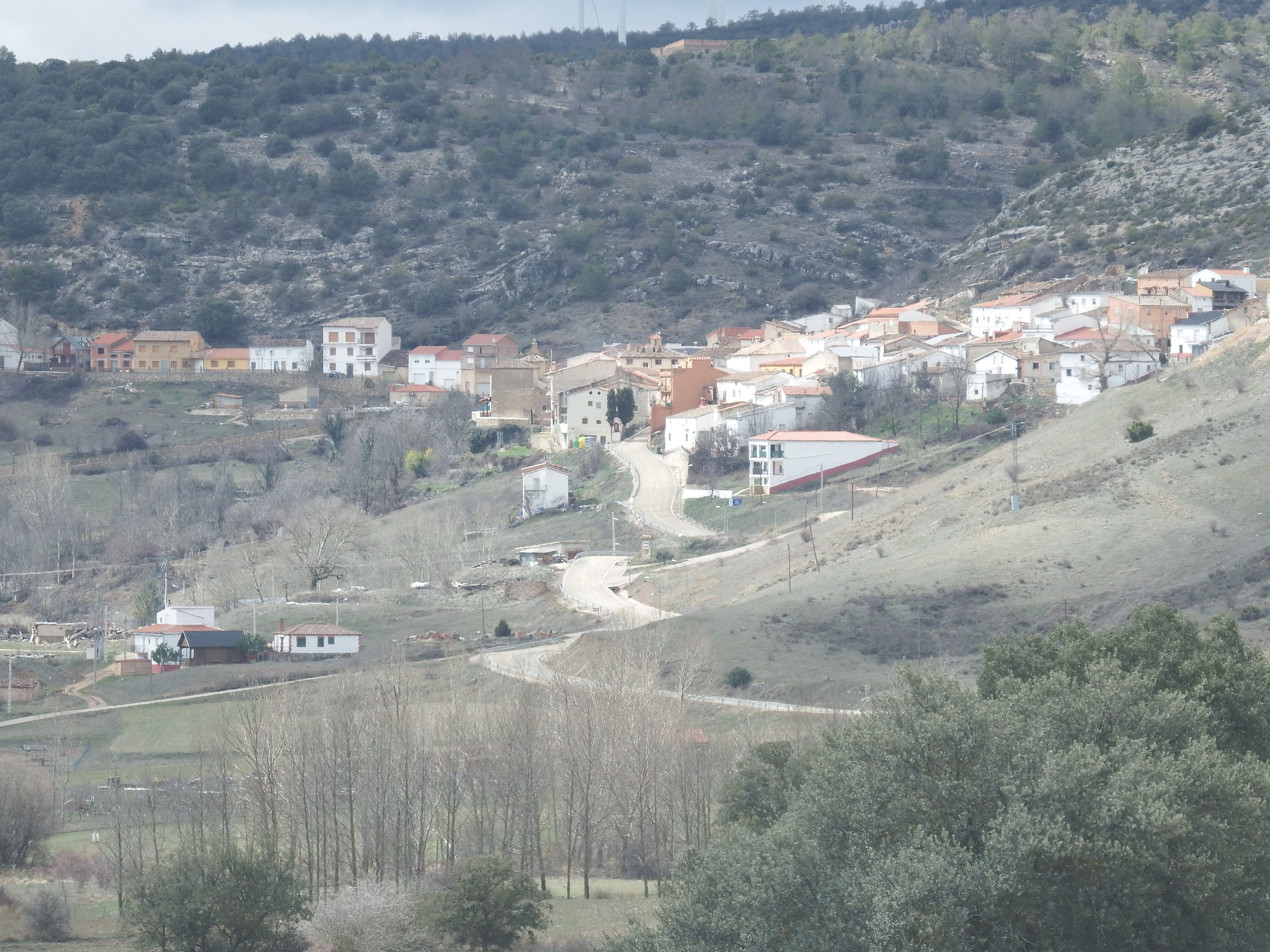

- Coat of arms

- Location within Spain Location within Castilla-La Mancha
- Coordinates: 39°54′N 1°34′W
- Country: Spain
- Autonomous community: Castile-La Mancha
- Province: Cuenca
- Municipality: San Martín de Boniches

Area
  - Total: 69 km^{2} (27 sq mi)

Population (2025-01-01)
  - Total: 43
  - Density: 0.62/km^{2} (1.6/sq mi)
- Time zone: UTC+1 (CET)
  - Summer (DST): UTC+2 (CEST)

San Martín de Boniches is a municipality located in the province of Cuenca, Castile-La Mancha, Spain. According to the 2004 census (INE), the municipality has a population of 92 inhabitants.
