= Mezen Basin =

Sedimentary basin in northwestern Russia

The Mezen Basin is a sedimentary basin located in northwestern Russia. It list southeast of the White Sea and bounds the Timanide Orogen to the north and west. The basin is classified as a pericratonic and epicratonic foreland basin within the East European Craton. The Mezen Basin contains the following pre-Vendian sediments: the Ust-Nafta Group with a maximum thickness of 1200 meters, on top of this is rests the Safonovo Group made up of carbonates and siliciclastic sediments reminiscent of flysch. The Safonovo Group upward end is an unconformity that separates it from the poorly sorted sandstones of the Uftuga Formation.
