= Decree-Law on the repression of the crimes of banditry and terrorism =

1947 Francoist anti-guerilla decree-law

The Decree-Law on the repression of the crimes of banditry and terrorism, or simply repression of banditry and terrorism was a Spanish decree-law promulgated by Francisco Franco on 18 April 1947 during the first Franco regime. It was intended to combat the guerrilla activity of the Maquis, which had increased due to the expectations raised among Republicans that the Allied victory in World War II would bring about the end of General Franco's dictatorship. The Decree-Law recapitulated all previous repressive legislation and confirmed the attribution of political crimes to military tribunals.

In January 1958, the Law of Summary Procedures in Courts-Martial was enacted, "foreign to the legal procedures of a State governed by the rule of law", which established a Special Military Court for Extremist Activities, whose investigating judge was Colonel Enrique Eymar, former president of the Tribunal for the Suppression of Freemasonry and Communism.

== History ==
Areas occupied by the Maqui guerrillas.

The Allies' declarations condemning the Franco regime boosted morale among the Republican opposition. In October 1944, clandestine contacts between socialists, anarchists, and republicans led to the creation of the first unitary opposition body within the country, the National Alliance of Democratic Forces. Neither the communists nor the Negrinist socialists were members of the Alliance, and the Alliance expressed its willingness to negotiate with the monarchist forces to restore democracy without making the restoration of the Republic a condition.

Likewise, in 1944, Maqui activity intensified, the most notable event of which was the attempted invasion of the Aran Valley in October 1944 by a contingent of some 6,000 communist guerrillas, which was a resounding failure as they were defeated by the Army and the Civil Guard.

To combat such guerrilla activity, the regime began tightening its control over popular movements, and in April 1947, Franco promulgated the Decree-Law on the Suppression of Banditry and Terrorism. The preamble of the Decree-Law stated that it intended to use "special measures of repression" to combat "the most serious types of crime in any post-war situation, a consequence of the relaxation of moral ties and the exaltation of impulses of cruelty and aggressiveness in criminal and maladjusted people." The articles established the cases in which the death penalty would be applied to "criminals"—or "bandits"—which included not only killing someone, but also brandishing "a weapon of war" or detaining "travelers in unpopulated areas."[1]

The Decree-Law was intended to provide legal cover for the "dirty war" actions of the Civil Guard and the Army to crush the anti-Franco guerrillas; the guerrillas were not considered combatants, but "bandits", in an attempt to depoliticize their struggle. Its promulgation marked the beginning of the so-called "three years of terror", when Franco's forces resorted to torture and extrajudicial executions of guerrillas, sometimes utilizing "ley de fugas"— intentionally provoking escape and using that as an excuse for execution. Their families and alleged "collaborators" in the mountains and rural areas were also subjected to torture and ill-treatment.

Both the guerrillas, Army, and Civil Guard resorted to reprisals, often affecting a "terrified civilian population". "A captured guerrilla had little chance of surviving," but neither did "a village mayor, or a notorious Francoist captured in a guerrilla raid."

== Bibliography ==
- Gil Pecharromán, Julio (2008). Con permiso de la autoridad. La España de Franco (1939-1975). Madrid: Temas de Hoy. ISBN 978-84-8460-693-2.
- Lorenzo Rubio, César (2020). "La máquina represiva: la tortura en el franquismo". In Pedro Oliver Olmo (ed.). La tortura en la España contemporánea. Madrid: Los Libros de la Catarata. pp. 131–198. ISBN 978-84-1352-077-3.
- Moradiellos, Enrique (2000). La España de Franco (1939-1975). Política y sociedad. Madrid: Síntesis. ISBN 84-7738-740-0.
- Payne, Stanley G. (1997). El primer franquismo. Los años de la autarquía. Madrid: Historia 16-Temas de Hoy. ISBN 84-7679-325-1.
