= Santa Cruz de Moya =

- municipality
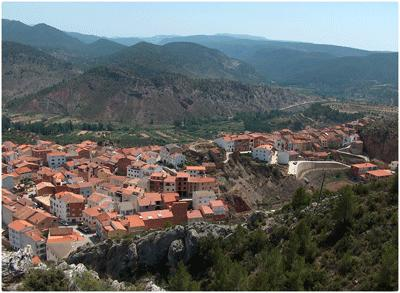

- Flag Coat of arms

- Location within Spain Location within Castilla-La Mancha
- Country: Spain
- Autonomous community: Castile-La Mancha
- Province: Cuenca
- Municipality: Santa Cruz de Moya

Area
  - Total: 110.75 km^{2} (42.76 sq mi)

Population (2025-01-01)
  - Total: 233
  - Density: 2.10/km^{2} (5.45/sq mi)
- Time zone: UTC+1 (CET)
  - Summer (DST): UTC+2 (CEST)

Santa Cruz de Moya is a municipality located in the province of Cuenca, Castile-La Mancha, Spain. According to the 2004 census (INE), the municipality has a population of 423 inhabitants.
