= Dolgoshchelskoye Rural Settlement =

Human settlement in Mezensky District, Arkhangelsk Oblast, Russia

Dolgoshchelskoye Rural Settlement (Russian: Долгощельское сельское поселение) is a rural settlement in the Mezensky Municipal District of Arkhangelsk Oblast in northern Russia. The rural settlement contains three villages. The administrative center is the selo of Dolgoshchelye.
