= Sixto Agudo =

Spanish politician

Sixto Agudo González (born 25 August 1916, Torrijos; died 29 June 2004) was a Spanish politician and World War II resistance member. His nom de guerre was 'Blanco'. He was married to Ángeles Blanco Brualla, the first Communist Party mayor in Aragón.

== Background ==
During his early years, Sixto Agudo joined the Socialist Youth. He was active during the peasants' general strike and the 1934 October Revolution. In April 1936 he became a member of the Toledo provincial committee of the Unified Socialist Youth. In the Spanish Civil War he fought at the battle fronts in Jarama, Madrid and Levante. He was captured by Italian troops and held in prison camps in Almendros, Albatera and Portacoeli. His last lieu of imprisonment was at Sa Pobla, on the island of Majorca. He managed to escape and reach France.

He was interned alongside many other Spaniards in the Argelès-sur-Mer concentration camp for a period. Inside the prison camp, he was part of an organization of Spanish communists. Agudo managed to escape, and took refuge in Aude in autumn 1941. In that region he took part in forming the first Spanish communist guerrilla unit on French soil. With the support of the French Communist Party, the Spanish communists set up a political-military school and a publication in the border region.

Agudo was put in-charge of the party organization in the Southern Zone of France, substituting Miguel López. He served as a Central Committee member of the Communist Party of Spain. Towards the end of 1943 he returned clandestinely to Spain, one of the first communists to do so. His mission was to meet with Manuel Giménez Fernández, former Minister of Agriculture in the Spanish Confederation of the Autonomous Right (CEDA) cabinet 1934–1935, in a move by the Communist Party to include monarchist forces in the opposition alliance.

== Imprisonment and release ==
Agudo was captured in Seville in 1944 and sentenced to death in 1945. His penalty was later changed to 30 years imprisonment. He was jailed in Burgos 1949–1961. He was conditionally released in 1961.

After his release from jail he returned to France. In exile, he was active in party work. He returned to Spain in 1976, and settled down in the native village of his spouse, Alcampell. He became the organization secretary of the Communist Party federation in Aragón. At the ninth congress of the Communist Party, he was elected as a member of the Control and Guarantees Committee of the party. He stood as candidate for Senate four times and was elected to the Aragonese Corts 1983–1987. He resigned from the Aragonese Corts to serve as mayor of Alcampell.

In 2000 the Government of Aragón issued a commemorative plaque for Sixto Agudo, in honour of 'his work to re-establish democratic freedoms in Spain and his work to support municipalism and socio-economic development in La Litera area during the Democracy'.
