= Mezensky (inhabited locality) =

Mezensky (Russian: Мезенский; masculine), Mezenskaya (Мезенская; feminine), or Mezenskoye (Мезенское; neuter) is the name of several rural localities in Russia:

- Mezensky (rural locality), a settlement in Pakhomovsky Selsoviet of Orlovsky District of Oryol Oblast
- Mezenskoye (rural locality), a selo under the administrative jurisdiction of the Town of Zarechny in Sverdlovsk Oblast
