= Benimàmet, Valencia =

Old city, now part of Valencia, Spain

Coordinates: 39°30′N 0°25′W

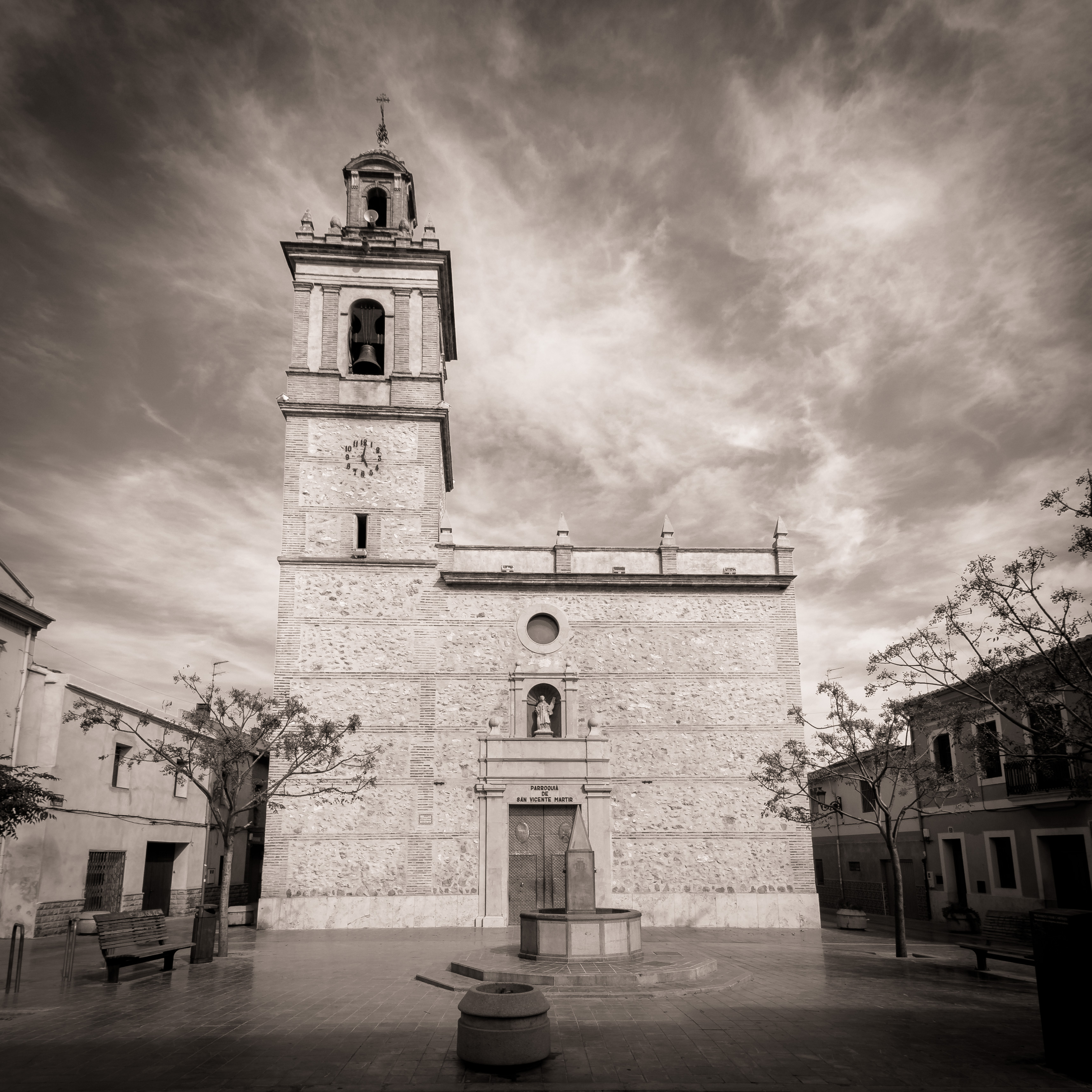
The church of St Vincent the Martyr

Benimàmet (Valencian pronunciation: [beniˈmamet], Spanish: Benimámet) is an old municipality now integrated as an urban part of Valencia, Spain. The name Benimàmet 'sons of Muhammad' is derived from Arabic during Muslim-ruled Al-Andalus.
