= Dorogorskoye =

Dorogorskoye Дорогорское
- Selo
- Location within Arkhangelsk Oblast Location within Russia
- Coordinates: 65°36′N 44°29′E
- Country: Russia
- Region: Arkhangelsk Oblast
- District: Mezensky District
- Time zone: UTC+3:00

Dorogorskoye (Russian: Дорого́рское) is a rural locality (a selo) and the administrative center of Dorogorskoye Rural Settlement of Mezensky District, Arkhangelsk Oblast, Russia. The population was 391 as of 2010. There are 3 streets.

== Geography ==
Dorogorskoye is located on the Mezen River, 31 km south of Mezen (the district's administrative centre) by road. Timoshchelye is the nearest rural locality.
