= Kimzha (rural locality) =

Kimzha Кимжа
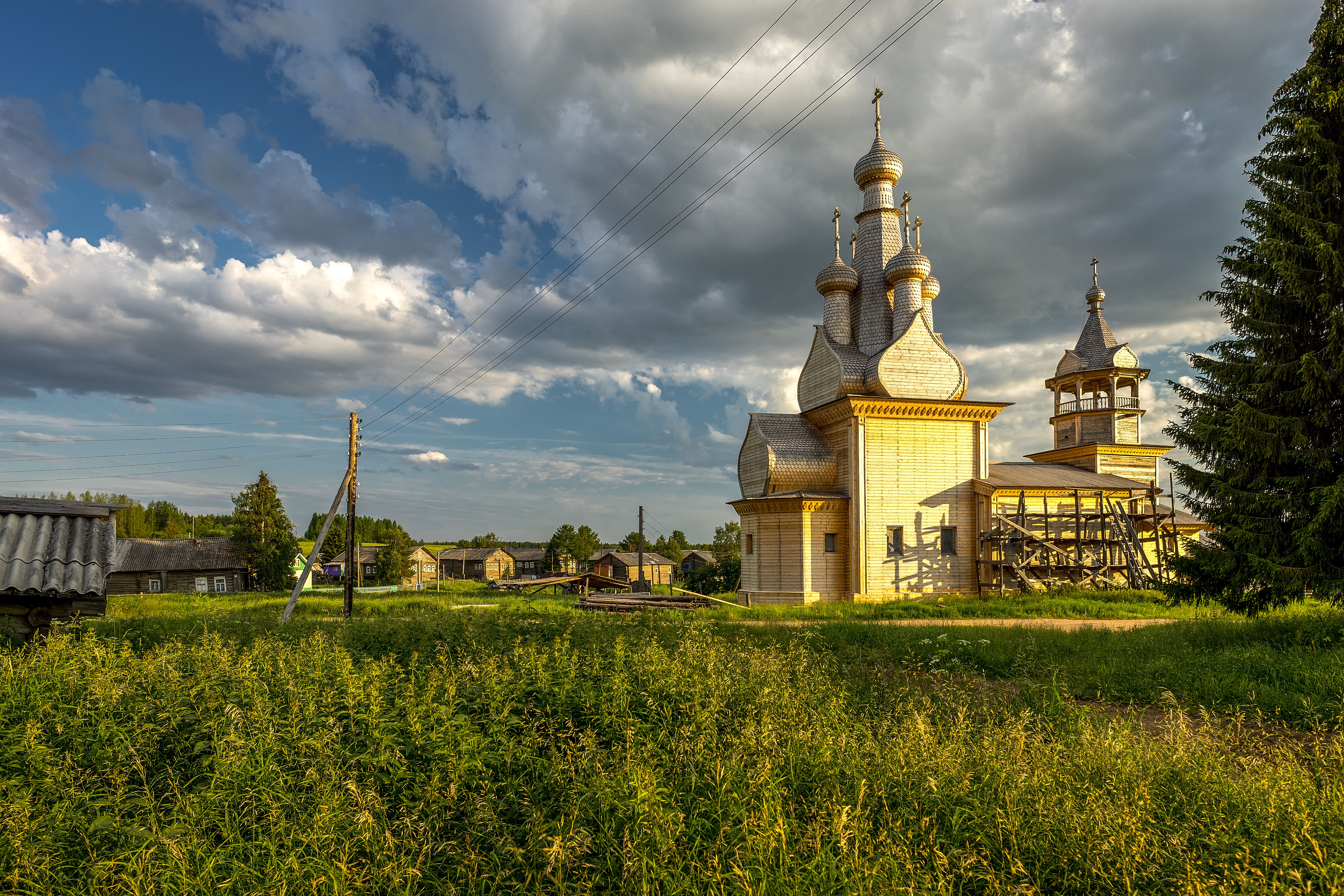
- Interactive map of Kimzha
- Location of Kimzha
- Coordinates: 65°34′14″N 44°36′26″E
- Country: Russia
- Federal subject: Arkhangelsk Oblast

Population
  - Estimate (2012): 134 )
- Time zone: UTC+3 (MSK)
- Postal code: 164756
- OKTMO ID: 11642412106

Kimzha (Russian: Кимжа) is a village in Mezensky District, Arkhangelsk Oblast, Russia. It is part of the Dolgoshchelskoye Rural Settlement.

In 2016 the Kimzha was included in The Most Beautiful Villages in Russia.

== Notable landmarks ==
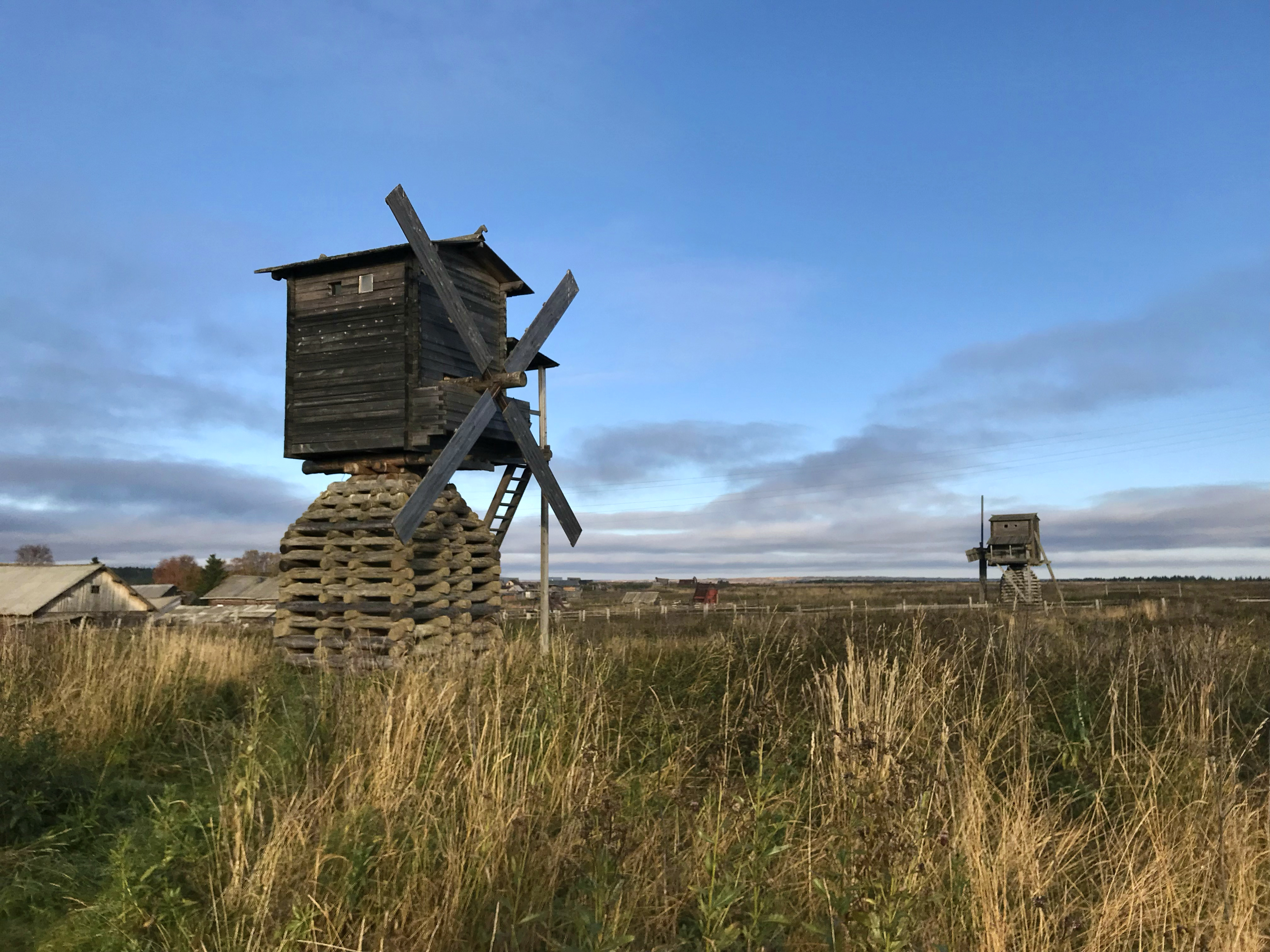
Restored post mills in Kimzha

=== Deryagin and Voronukhin's mills ===
Historically there were up to ten post mills in Kimzha. Today there are two left with one in working condition, while the second has been converted into a museum. The mills are some of the northernmost post mills in the world, and the village is one of three settlements in Russia where historic windmills have been preserved.

== Gallery ==
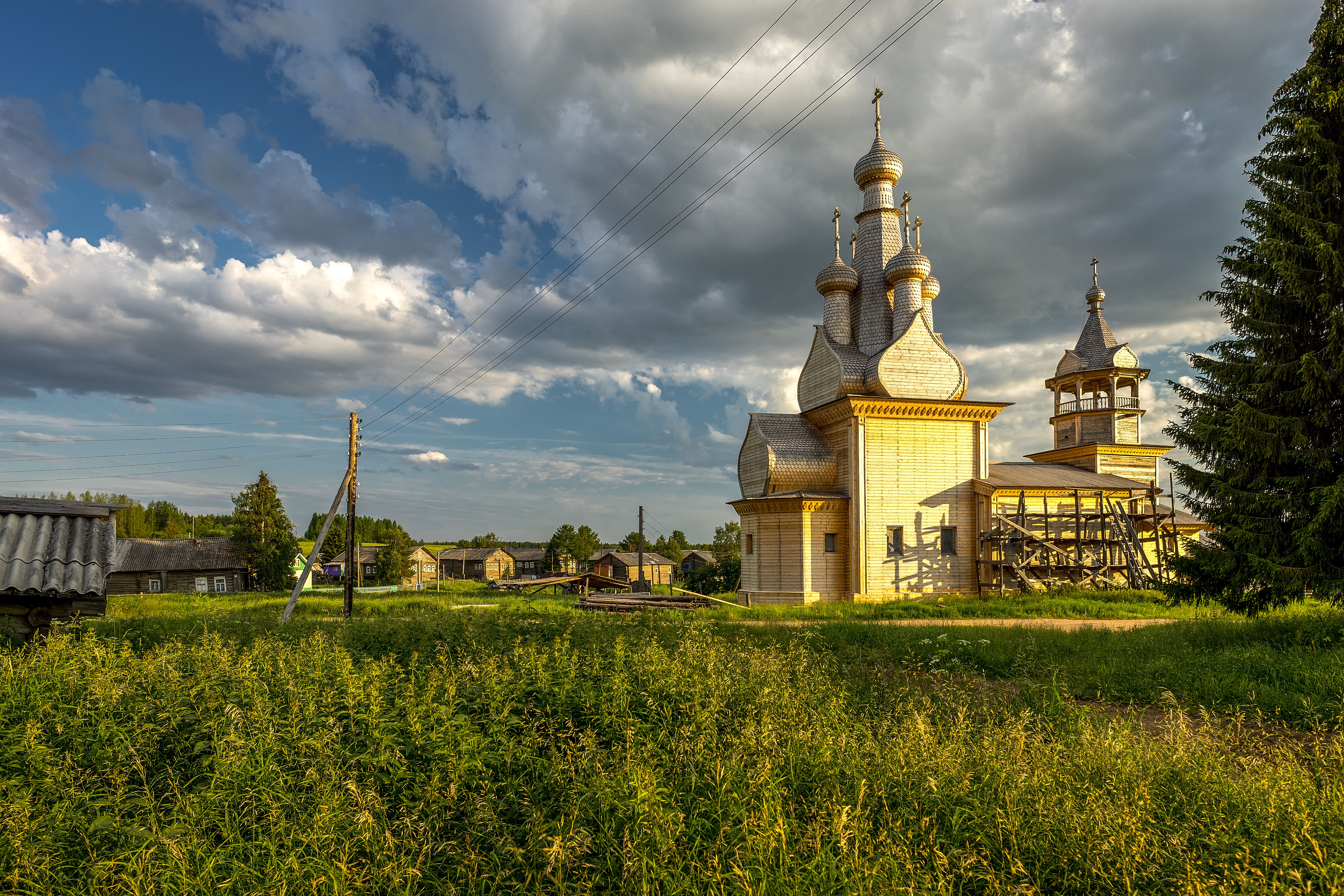
Kimzha (on the right is the Odigitrian Church)

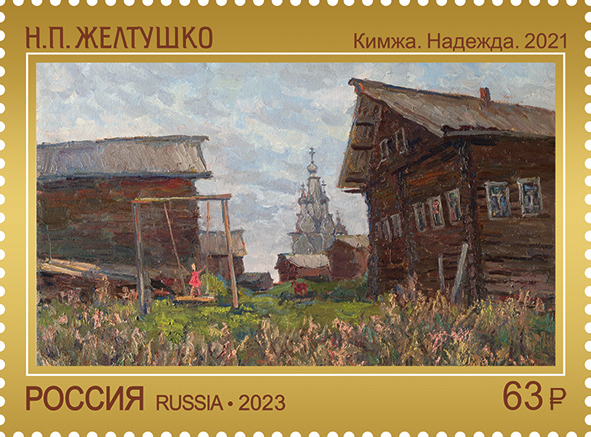
Painting by N. P. Zheltushko «Kimzha. Hope» (2021) on the postage stamp of Russia in 2023 from the series "Contemporary Art of Russia" (№ 3036)
