= Mezen Airport =

- IATA: none; ICAO: none

Summary
- Airport type: Public
- Location: Mezen
- Elevation AMSL: 46 ft (14 m)
- Coordinates: 65°52′42″N 44°12′54″E
- Interactive map of Mezen Airport

Runways
Direction	Length		Surface
Direction	ft	m	Surface
13/31	4,757	1,450	Concrete

Mezen Airport (Russian: Аэропорт Мезень) is an airport in Arkhangelsk Oblast, Russia located 4 km north of Mezen. It handles small transport planes. There are several weekly flights to Arkhangelsk (Vaskovo Airport) and several flights per month to the remote locations of Mezensky District — the selos of Koyda, Moseyevo, and Safonovo.

In 1883, a weather station was open in Mezen. It was operating under the authority by the Russian Geographical Society but run by single individuals. In 1939 the observations suitable for aviation started, and from 1942, the weather station was used to support the flights.

== See also ==
- List of airports in Russia
