= Mezen (river) =

Mezen Russian: Мезень
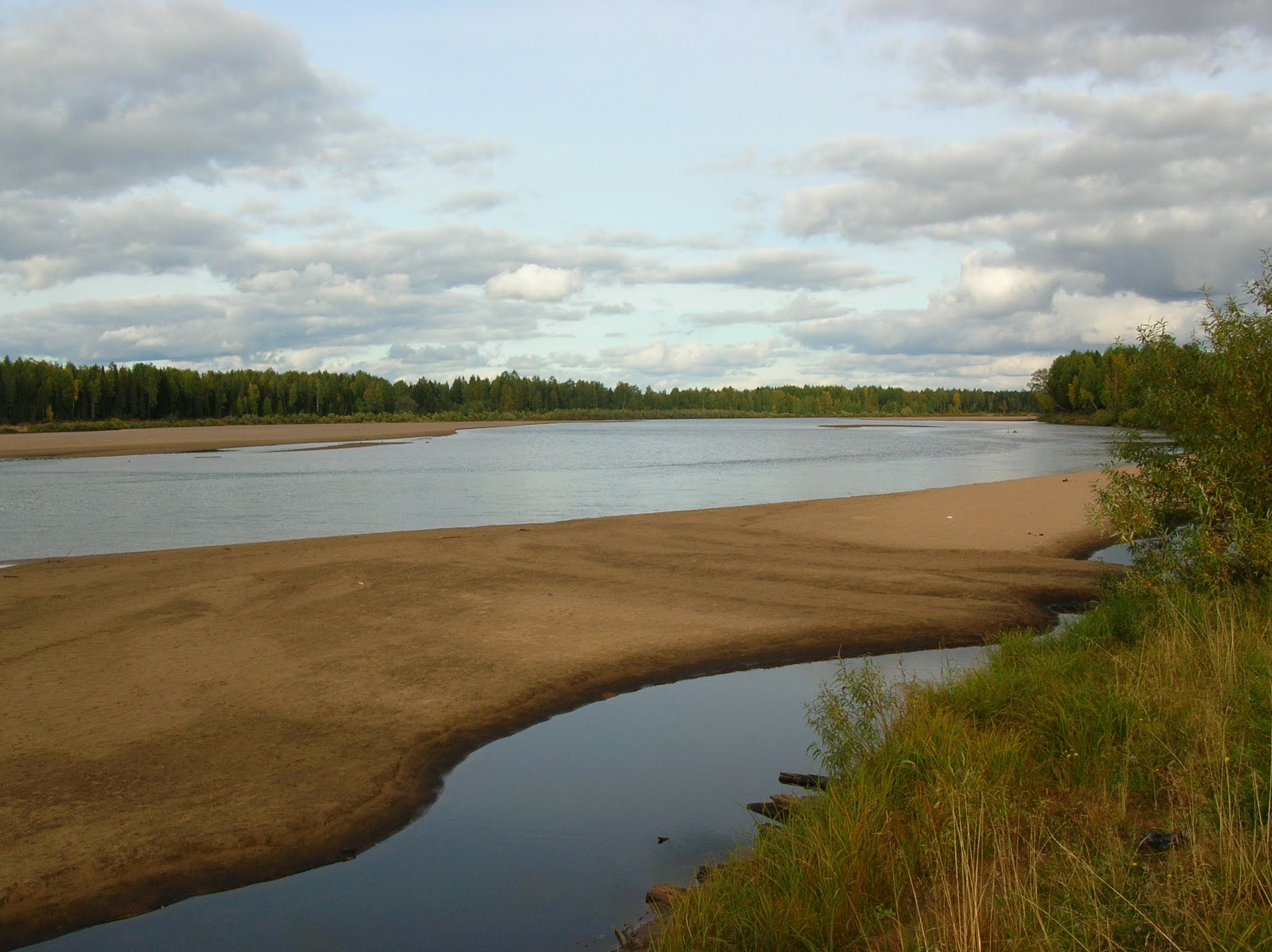

- The river basin of the Mezen

Location
- Country: Russia

Physical characteristics
- Mouth: Mezen Bay, White Sea
  - coordinates: 65°59′10″N 44°03′45″E
  - elevation: 0 m (0 ft)
- Length: 966 km (600 mi)
- Basin size: 78,000 square kilometres (30,000 mi^{2})
- Discharge
  - average: 886 cubic metres per second (31,300 cu ft/s)

The Mezen (Russian: Мезень; Komi: Мозын, Mozyn) is a river in Udorsky District of the Komi Republic and in Leshukonsky and Mezensky Districts of Arkhangelsk Oblast in Russia. Its mouth is located in the Mezen Bay of the White Sea. Mezen is one of the biggest rivers of European Russia. It is 966 kilometres (600 mi) long, and the area of its basin 78,000 square kilometres (30,000 sq mi). The principal tributaries of the Mezen are the Bolshaya Loptyuga (left), the Pyssa (left), the Mezenskaya Pizhma (right), the Sula (right), the Kyma (right), the Vashka (left), the Pyoza (right), and the Kimzha (left).

The river basin of the Mezen comprises vast areas in the east and north-east of Arkhangelsk Oblast and in the west of the Komi Republic. The town of Mezen, the urban type settlements of Usogorsk and Kamenka, as well as the administrative center of Udorsky District, the selo of Koslan all are located on the banks of the Mezen. The administrative center of Leshukonsky District, the selo of Leshukonskoye, is located on the Vashka River several kilometers upstream from the confluence of the Vashka and the Mezen and is connected with the right bank of the Mezen by a ferry crossing.

The source of the Mezen is in the Timan Ridge in the Komi Republic, west of the northern Ural Mountains. It flows first south-west, then sharply turns roughly in the north-western direction. The upper course of the Mezen runs through the hilly landscape. The Mezen flows into the Mezen Bay of the White Sea near the town of Mezen, right below the Arctic Circle. Near its mouth, the Pyoza River enters from the east.

The Mezen is navigable below the selo of Koslan, however, there is no regular passenger navigation except for ferry crossings.

== History ==
The area was populated by Finnic peoples and then colonized by the Novgorod Republic. In the 13th century the Novgorod merchants already reached the White Sea. The Mezen was used by Novgorod merchants as the trading route to the basin of the Pechora which was attractive because of the fur. From the Northern Dvina, they went upstream the Pinega and took the boats by land to the Kuloy. The boats then were taken from the Kuloy to the Mezen. The river route continued east up the Pyoza, portage, and down the Tsilma to the Pechora.

Another route went from the Northern Dvina upstream the Pukshenga, then moved to the Pokshenga and downstream to the Pinega. From the Pinega, the merchants used the Yozhuga, the Zyryanskaya Vashka, and the Vashka to get to the Mezen.

After the fall of Novgorod, the area became a part of the Grand Duchy of Moscow. The first permanent Russian settlements on the Mezen River are mentioned during the 16th century: Yuroma (1513) and Koynas (1554). The middle course of the Mezen, approximately the current area of Leshukonsky District, was where Russian and Komi cultures mixed the most. In the lower course of the Mezen, currently Mezensky District, Russians dominated, whereas in the upper course, currently Udorsky District, Komi dominated.
