= Border Security Zone of Russia =

Restricted economic zone in Russia

A Border Security Zone (Russian: пограничная зона) in Russia is the designation of a strip of land (usually, though not always, along a Russian external border) where economic activity and access are restricted in line with the Frontier Regime Regulations set by the Federal Security Service (FSB). For foreign tourists to visit the zone a permit issued by the local FSB department is required.

The restricted access zone (generally 7.5 kilometres (4.7 mi) width, but running as much as 90 kilometres (56 mi) deep along the Estonian border) was established in the Soviet Union in 1934, and later expanded, at times including vast territories. In 1935–36, in order to secure the western border of the Soviet Union, many nationalities considered unreliable (Poles, Germans, Ingrian Finns, Estonians, Latvians) were forcibly transferred from the zone by forces of the NKVD.

After the dissolution of the Soviet Union in 1991, the borders of the new Russian Federation were dramatically different, but the zone was not corrected accordingly and hence effectively ceased to exist. In 1993, the Law on the State Border was adopted and reestablished a border strip with restricted access, which should not exceed 5 kilometres (3.1 mi) (although in fact it became much wider in some places). In 2004, the law was amended, the 5 km restriction was removed, and the FSB was legally authorised to draw the zone's limits on its own without coordination with local authorities. In 2006, FSB Director Nikolai Patrushev and his deputy Sergei Smirnov issued decrees delimiting the zone, which expanded greatly and included many large settlements, important transport routes and resort areas, especially in the Republic of Karelia, Leningrad Oblast, and Primorsky Krai. In 2007, pressured by the public, the FSB curtailed the zone in some places.

== See also ==
- FSB Border Service of Russia
- Soviet Border Troops
- Genocide of the Ingrian Finns
- Soviet Ingria
