= Leshukonskoye =

Leshukonskoye Лешуконское
- Selo
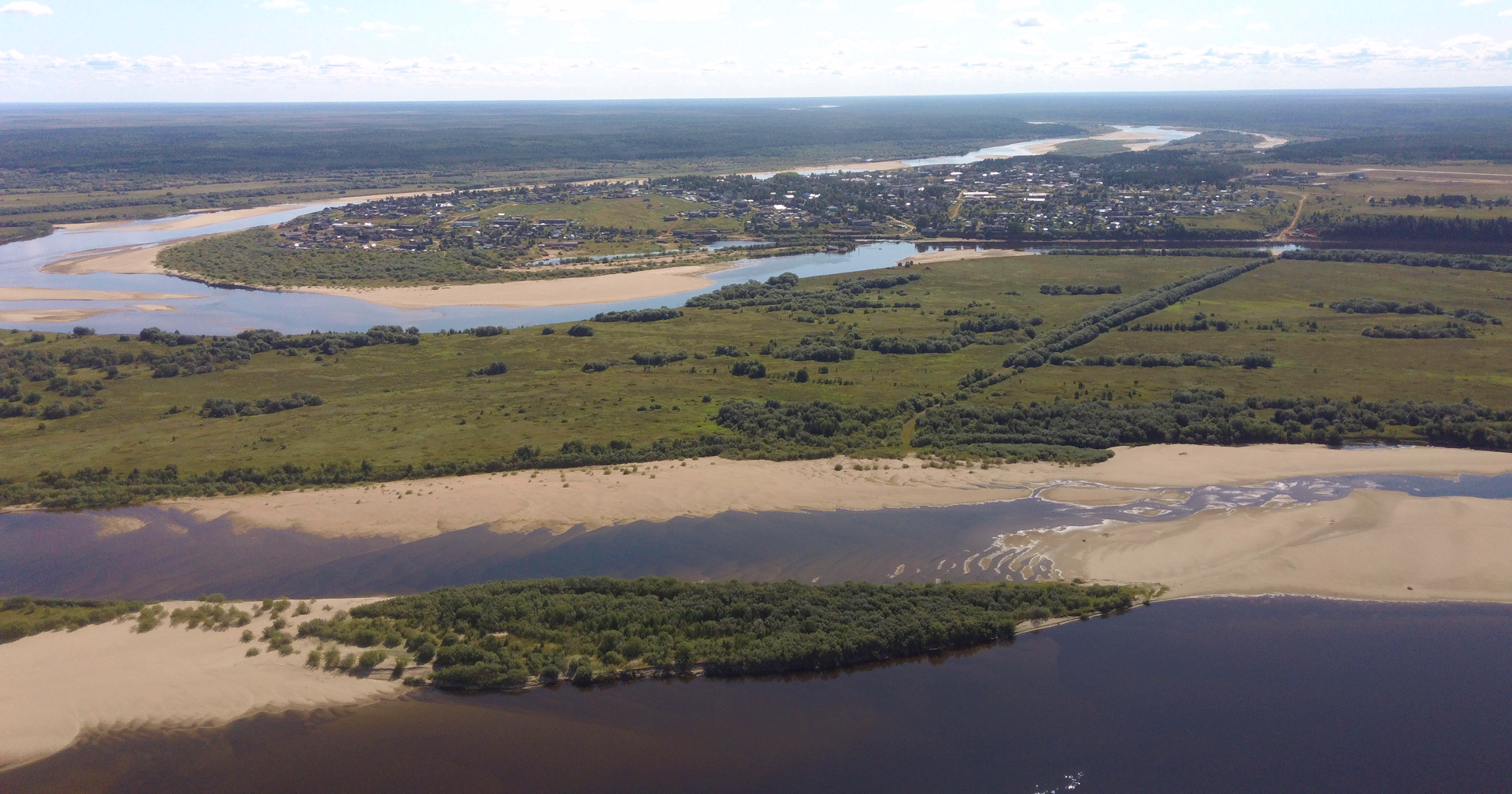
- View of Leshukonskoye
- Interactive map of Leshukonskoye
- Location of Leshukonskoye Leshukonskoye (Arkhangelsk Oblast)
- Coordinates: 64°54′N 45°46′E
- Country: Russia
- Federal subject: Arkhangelsk Oblast
- Administrative district: Leshukonsky District
- Selsoviet: Leshukonsky Selsoviet

Population (2010 Census)
  - Total: 4,406
  - Estimate (2021): 3,550 (−19.4%)

Administrative status
  - Capital of: Leshukonsky District, Leshukonsky Selsoviet

Municipal status
  - Municipal district: Leshukonsky Municipal District
  - Rural settlement: Leshukonskoye Rural Settlement
  - Capital of: Leshukonsky Municipal District, Verkhnetoyemskoye Rural Settlement
- Time zone: UTC+3 (MSK)
- Postal code: 164670
- OKTMO ID: 11638408101

Leshukonskoye (Russian: Лешуконское) is a rural locality (a selo) and the administrative center of Leshukonsky District of Arkhangelsk Oblast, Russia, located on the left bank of the Vashka River. It also serves as the administrative center of Leshukonsky Selsoviet, one of the seven selsoviets into which the district is administratively divided. Municipally, it is the administrative center of Leshukonskoye Rural Settlement. Population: 4,406 (2010 census); 5,003 (2002 census); 6,199 (1989 Soviet census).

== Etymology ==
The name of Leshukonskoye is apparently derived from the Russian les, which means the forest.

== History ==
The area was originally populated by speakers of Uralic languages and then colonized by the Novgorod Republic. After the fall of Novgorod, the area became a part of the Grand Duchy of Moscow. First Russian settlements on the Mezen River are mentioned under 16th century: Yuroma (1513) and Koynas (1554). Leshukonskoye is known since 1641 and was the administrative center of Ust-Vazhskaya Volost. The middle course of the Mezen was the area where Russian and Komi mixed the most.

In the course of the administrative reform performed in 1708 by Peter the Great the area was included into Archangelgorod Governorate. In 1780, the Governorate was abolished and transformed into Vologda Viceroyalty. In 1796, the area moved into the Arkhangelsk Governorate. The current territory of the district was included into the Mezensky Uyezd. December 28, 1917, a new Ust-Vashsky Uyezd with the center of Ust-Vashka (currently Leshukonskoye) was established, however, in 1925 it was merged back into the Mezensky Uyezd.

In 1929, several governorates were merged into Northern Krai. July 15, 1929 the uyezds were abolished, and Leshukonsky District was established.

== Geography ==
Leshukonskoye is located on the left bank of the Vashka River, several kilometers upstream from its confluence with the Mezen River. Since the roads on the left bank of the Mezen are not connected with the road network of Arkhangelsk Oblast, the only land connection with the outside world is via ferry boat to the village of Smolyanets, on the opposite (right) bank of the Mezen.

Climate data for Leshukonskoye
Month	Jan	Feb	Mar	Apr	May	Jun	Jul	Aug	Sep	Oct	Nov	Dec	Year
Mean daily maximum °C (°F)	−11 (12)	−9 (16)	−2 (28)	4 (39)	10 (50)	17 (63)	21 (70)	17 (63)	11 (52)	3 (37)	−3 (27)	−8 (18)	4 (40)
Mean daily minimum °C (°F)	−20 (−4)	−18 (0)	−12 (10)	−7 (19)	0 (32)	5 (41)	9 (48)	8 (46)	4 (39)	−2 (28)	−9 (16)	−15 (5)	−5 (23)
Average precipitation mm (inches)	31 (1.2)	25 (1.0)	26 (1.0)	32 (1.3)	42 (1.7)	58 (2.3)	64 (2.5)	71 (2.8)	64 (2.5)	59 (2.3)	45 (1.8)	40 (1.6)	557 (22)
Average precipitation days	22	19	18	15	14	15	14	17	19	22	22	24	221
Mean daily sunshine hours	0	2	3	6	7	9	9	6	3	1	0	0	4
Source: http://www.worldclimateguide.co.uk/climateguides/russiaeurope/leshukonskoye.php

== Economy ==
=== Industry ===
Timber industry, including resin production, is present in and around Leshukonskoye.

=== Transportation ===
The Mezen River and the Vashka River are both navigable, however, there is no passenger navigation in Leshukonskoye except for the ferry boat to the village of Smolenets. In Summer, the ferry connects to the all-seasonal road to Arkhangelsk, only completed in 2008. In winter, temporary roads (zimniks) were built in snow and the river is frozen over; in Spring and Fall when the river ice is thin, air transport is the only means for passenger connections to Arkhangelsk and the rest of the world.

There is an airport in Leshukonskoye, with weekly flights to Arkhangelsk on Tuesdays.

== Education ==
There is a modern school with all 12 grades and 350 students.
