= Mezensky District =

Mezensky District Мезенский район (Russian)
- District
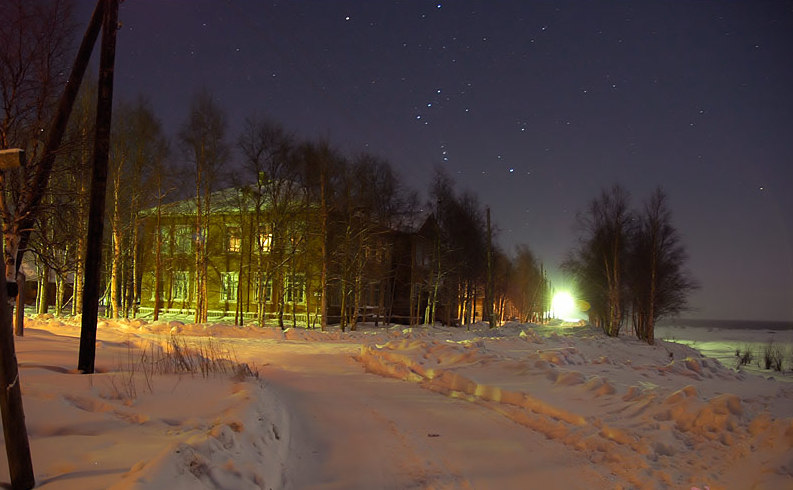
- School in Mezen

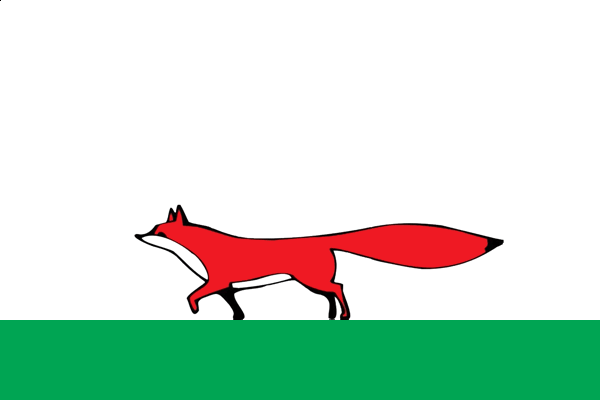
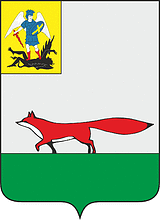
- Flag Coat of arms
- Location of Mezensky District in Arkhangelsk Oblast
- Coordinates: 64°51′N 44°14′E
- Country: Russia
- Federal subject: Arkhangelsk Oblast
- Established: July 15, 1929
- Administrative center: Mezen

Area
  - Total: 34,400 km^{2} (13,300 sq mi)

Population (2010 Census)
  - Total: 10,330
  - Density: 0.300/km^{2} (0.778/sq mi)
  - Urban: 59.6%
  - Rural: 40.4%

Administrative structure
  - Administrative divisions: 1 Towns of district significance, 1 Urban-type settlements with jurisdictional territory, 13 Selsoviets
  - Inhabited localities: 1 cities/towns, 1 urban-type settlements, 52 rural localities

Municipal structure
  - Municipally incorporated as: Mezensky Municipal District
  - Municipal divisions: 2 urban settlements, 12 rural settlements
- Time zone: UTC+3 (MSK)
- OKTMO ID: 11642000
- Website: http://www.mezen.ru/

Mezensky District (Russian: Мезе́нский райо́н) is an administrative district (raion), one of the twenty-one in Arkhangelsk Oblast, Russia. As a municipal division, it is incorporated as Mezensky Municipal District. It is located in the northeast of the oblast and borders with Nenets Autonomous Okrug in the northeast, Ust-Tsilemsky District of the Komi Republic in the east, Leshukonsky and Pinezhsky Districts in the south, and with Primorsky District in the southwest. From the north, the district borders the White Sea. The area of the district is 34,400 square kilometers (13,300 sq mi). Its administrative center is the town of Mezen. Population: 10,330 (2010 census); 13,124 (2002 census); 17,796 (1989 Soviet census). The population of Mezen accounts for 34.6% of the total district's population.

== History ==
The area was originally populated by speakers of Uralic languages and then colonized by the Novgorod Republic. After the fall of Novgorod, the area became a part of the Grand Duchy of Moscow. Komi started moving to the Mezen in the 14th and 15th centuries. First Russian settlements on the Mezen were mentioned in the 16th century. The lower course of the Mezen, the current area of the district, was where Russian culture existed in its original state, not mixing with the Komi culture. The town of Mezen was founded in the 16th century as Okladnikova Sloboda. The area was at the time located on one of the main ways from central Russia to the Pechora River basin and to the Ural Mountains.

In the course of the administrative reform carried out in 1708 by Peter the Great, the area was included into Archangelgorod Governorate. In 1780, the governorate was abolished and transformed into Vologda Viceroyalty, and Mezen got the town rights. In 1796, the area was transferred to Arkhangelsk Governorate. The current territory of the district was included into Mezensky Uyezd. On December 28, 1917, a new Ust-Vashsky Uyezd with the administrative center in Ust-Vashka (currently Leshukonskoye) was established; however, in 1925 it was merged back into Mezensky Uyezd. In 1929, several governorates were merged into Northern Krai. On July 15, 1929, the uyezds were abolished and Mezensky District was established. It became a part of Arkhangelsk Okrug of Northern Krai.

In the following years, the first-level administrative division of Russia kept changing. In 1930, the okrug was abolished, and the district was subordinated to the central administration of Northern Krai. In 1936, the krai itself was transformed into Northern Oblast. In 1937, Northern Oblast was split into Arkhangelsk Oblast and Vologda Oblast. Mezensky District remained in Arkhangelsk Oblast ever since.

== Geography ==
The district is elongated from west to east. A major part of the district belongs to the basins of the Mezen River (with the main tributaries the Pyoza and the Kimzha) and the Kuloy River (with the Nemnyuga and the Soyana), which both end up in the Mezen Bay of the White Sea. Areas on the White Sea coast drain directly into the sea, and some areas in the northeast of the district drain into the Pyosha River and other rivers of the Barents Sea basin.

Almost the whole of the district is covered by coniferous forests (taiga). The northern part of the district is transitional area between taiga and tundra (lesotundra). There are many glacial lakes across the district. The biggest lakes are east of the Mezen, Lake Varsh (shared with Nenets Autonomous Okrug), Lake Pocha, and Lake Vyzhletskoye.

The district also includes Morzhovets Island which separates the Mezen Bay from the entrance of the White Sea. The island is the only part of the district which lies above the Arctic Circle.

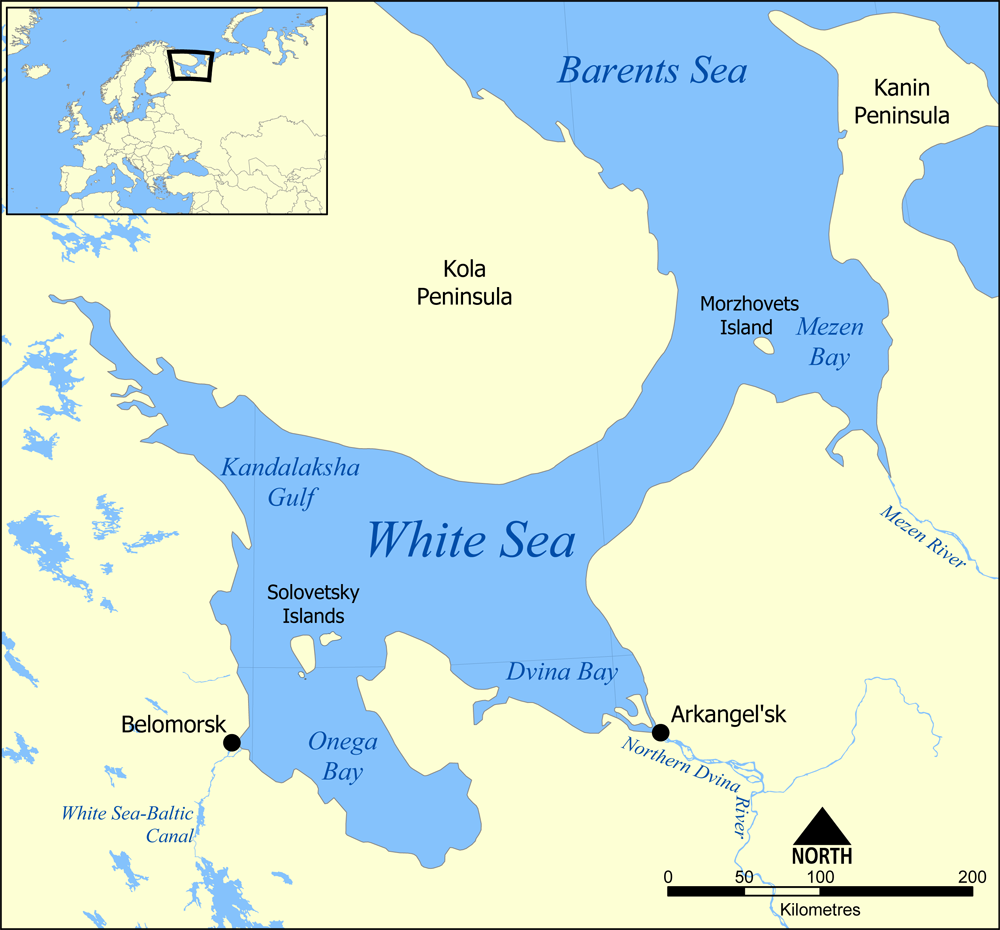
Location of Morzhovets Island

The part of the district located east of the Mezen is essentially unpopulated, with the exceptions of the right bank of the river and of several villages in the valley of the Pyoza.

== Divisions ==
As an administrative division, the district is divided into fourteen selsoviets and one town of district significance (Mezen). The following selsoviets have been established (the administrative centers are given in parentheses):

- Bychensky (Bychye)
- Dolgoshchelsky (Dolgoshchelye)
- Dorogorsky (Dorogorskoye)
- Kamensky (Kamenka)
- Koydensky (Koyda)
- Kozmogorodsky (Kozmogorodskoye)
- Lampozhensky (Lampozhnya)
- Moseyevsky (Moseyevo)
- Ruchyovsky (Ruchyi)
- Sovpolsky (Chizhgora)
- Soyansky (Soyana)
- Tselegorsky (Tselegora)
- Yolkinsky (Safonovo)
- Zherdsky (Zherd)

=== Municipal divisions ===
As a municipal division, the district is divided into two urban settlements and twelve rural settlements (the administrative centers are given in parentheses):

- Mezenskoye Urban Settlement (Mezen)
- Bychenskoye Rural Settlement (Bychye)
- Dolgoshchelskoye Rural Settlement (Dolgoshchelye)
- Dorogorskoye Rural Settlement (Dorogorskoye)
- Kamenskoye Rural Settlement (Kamenka)
- Koydenskoye Rural Settlement (Koyda)
- Kozmogorodskoye Rural Settlement (Kozmogorodskoye)
- Moseyevskoye Rural Settlement (Moseyevo)
- Ruchyovskoye Rural Settlement (Ruchyi)
- Safonovskoye Rural Settlement (Safonovo)
- Sovpolskoye Rural Settlement (Chizhgora)
- Soyanskoye Rural Settlement (Soyana)
- Tselegorskoye Rural Settlement (Tselegora)
- Zherdskoye Rural Settlement (Zherd)

== Restricted access ==
The northern part of the district is included into border security zone, intended to protect the borders of Russia from unwanted activity. In particular, the town of Mezen, the urban-type settlement of Kamenka, and the whole White Sea coast within the district, including such rural localities as Ruchyi, Koyda, and Dolgoshchelye, as well as Morzhovets Island, are included into this restricted area. In order to visit the zone, a permit issued by the local FSB department is required.

== Economy ==
=== Agriculture ===
Historically, fishery was the main source of income in the White Sea coast. The selo of Dolgoshchelye in the estuary of the Kuloy River was the main harbor of fishermen. In Soviet times, the fishery in the Arctic Ocean was state-sponsored; after 1990 the funds were cut, and the fishery went into decline.

A special breed of horses, Mezen horse, was bred in the Mezen River valley. The Mezen horses are rather small but suitable for difficult work and easily survive cold winters.

=== Transportation ===
Both the Mezen and the Kuloy Rivers are navigable within the district limits; however, there is no passenger navigation except for the ferry boats across the rivers. Until 2008, there were no all-seasonal roads in the district. During winter, temporary roads (zimniks) are built in snow; in summer, air transport is the only means for passenger connections to Arkhangelsk and the rest of the world. Currently, there is one all-seasonal road which connects the village of Kimzha with Arkhangelsk via Pinega, and two branches from this road along the right bank of the Mezen. One branch runs north to the town of Mezen, whereas the second one runs south to the selo of Leshukonskoye.

There is an airport in Mezen, with several weekly flights to Arkhangelsk. There is also an airport in Kamenka.

The majority of the villages of the district are not connected by all-season roads to the main road network, and the only means of getting to Mezen and Arkhangelsk is by air.

== Culture and recreation ==
The district contains two objects classified as cultural and historical heritage by Russian Federal law, and additionally a number of objects classified as cultural and historical heritage of local importance. The objects under federal protection are the wooden bell tower in the selo of Dolgoshchelye (burned down in 1994 and no longer exists) and the wooden Hodegetria Church in the village of Kimzha (1709, currently disassembled). The objects under local protection are wooden churches, chapels, windmills, peasant and merchant houses.

The only state museum in the district is the Mezen Regional Museum, located in the town of Mezen.
