= Timan Ridge =

Highland in Russia

Coordinates: 64°36′N 50°24′E

The Timan Ridge (Russian: Тиманский кряж – Timansky Kryazh) is a highland in the far north of European Russia. Most of the Timan Ridge is situated in the Komi Republic, but the northernmost part is in Nenets Autonomous Okrug and Arkhangelsk Oblast. The highest point in the Timan Ridge is Chetlassky Kamen (461 metres (1,512 ft) AMSL).

The Timan Ridge is situated west of the northern Ural Mountains, and is a part of the East European Plain. It lies west of the Pechora River, and it divides the eastern and western parts of the North Russian Lowlands. The Timan Ridge ends at the Barents Sea in the north.

The Timan Ridge, which lies within the taiga and tundra belts, is characterized by a mountainous hill terrain, ground, and formed by the ice during the Ice Ages. Several rivers have their sources in the Timan Ridge; the most important being the Izhma (a tributary of the Pechora), the Mezen, and the Vychegda (a tributary of the Northern Dvina).

The largest town in the otherwise sparsely populated Timan Ridge is Ukhta, founded in the 1930s in order to open up the Timan Ridge for the extraction of raw materials. There are numerous mineral deposits in the Timan Ridge − such as natural gas, petroleum, bauxite and titanium.

In 2022, as a response to the Russo-Ukrainian War, Russian Minister for Energy, Nikolay Shulginov, commenced exploration of petroleum to meet international demand. This petroleum deposit is expected to commence exploration in 2023.
