= Mezensky Uyezd =

Mezensky Uyezd (Мезенский уезд) was one of the subdivisions of the Arkhangelsk Governorate of the Russian Empire. It was situated in the eastern part of the governorate. Its administrative centre was Mezen.

== Demographics ==
At the time of the Russian Empire Census of 1897, Mezensky Uyezd had a population of 25,029. Of these, 91.2% spoke Russian, 4.4% Komi-Zyrian, 4.2% Nenets and 0.1% Romani as their native language.
