= Mezen, Mezensky District, Arkhangelsk Oblast =

Town in Arkhangelsk Oblast, Russia

Mezen Мезень
- Town
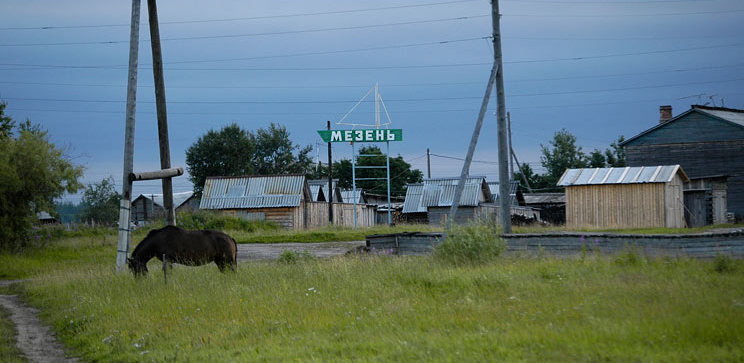
- View of Mezen from the airport

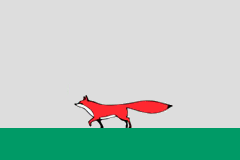
- Flag Coat of arms
- Interactive map of Mezen
- Location of Mezen Mezen (Arkhangelsk Oblast)
- Coordinates: 65°50′38″N 44°14′47″E
- Country: Russia
- Federal subject: Arkhangelsk Oblast
- Administrative district: Mezensky District
- Town of district significanceSelsoviet: Mezen
- Founded: 1780
- Elevation: 20 m (66 ft)

Population (2010 Census)
  - Total: 3,575
  - Estimate (2025): 2,797 (−21.8%)

Administrative status
  - Capital of: Mezensky District, town of district significance of Mezen

Municipal status
  - Municipal district: Mezensky Municipal District
  - Urban settlement: Mezenskoye Urban Settlement
  - Capital of: Mezensky Municipal District, Mezenskoye Urban Settlement
- Time zone: UTC+3 (MSK)
- Postal code: 164750
- OKTMO ID: 11642101001

Mezen (Russian: Мезе́нь) is a town and the administrative center of Mezensky District in Arkhangelsk Oblast, Russia, located on the right bank of the Mezen River close to the point where it flows into the White Sea. Population: 3,575 (2010 census); 3,863 (2002 census); 4,968 (1989 Soviet census).

== History ==
The settlement at the location of the present-day Mezen was founded in the 16th century and was known as Okladnikova Sloboda (Окладникова Слобода). It was subsequently developed into the trading center of the Mezen River valley where annual trade fairs were held. Besides the trade, the main occupations of the Mezen inhabitants were fishery and seal hunting. In 1780, Okladnikova Sloboda was merged with the nearby settlement of Kuznetsovskaya Sloboda into the town of Mezen. In 1784, Mezen became the seat of Mezensky Uyezd of Vologda Viceroyalty. In 1796, the territory was transferred to Arkhangelsk Governorate. In 1929, several governorates were merged into Northern Krai. On July 15, 1929, the uyezds were abolished and Mezen became the administrative center of Mezensky District.

== Administrative and municipal status ==
Within the framework of administrative divisions, Mezen serves as the administrative center of Mezensky District. As an administrative division, it is, together with the village of Semzha, incorporated within Mezensky District as the town of district significance of Mezen. As a municipal division, the town of district significance of Mezen, together with the territory of Lampozhensky Selsoviet (which comprises four rural localities) in Mezensky District, are incorporated within Mezensky Municipal District as Mezenskoye Urban Settlement.

== Restricted access ==
The northern part of Mezensky District, including Mezen itself, is included into the border security zone, intended to protect the borders of Russia from unwanted activity. In order to visit Mezen, a permit issued by the local Federal Security Service department is required.

== Economy ==
=== Industry ===
Economic activity in Mezen is currently limited to food industry and mechanical works. The Mezen sawmill and the Mezen sea harbor are both located in Kamenka across the Mezen River.

=== Transportation ===
The Mezen River is navigable; however, there is no passenger navigation in Mezen except for the ferry boat to Kamenka. There is an all-season road to Arkhangelsk (which crosses the Mezen near the village of Kimzha), completed in 2008. During winter, temporary roads (zimniks) are built in snow.

Mezen is served by the Mezen Airport, with several weekly flights to Arkhangelsk.

== Culture and recreation ==
Mezen is one of the few former uyezd towns which generally preserved the historical center. There are many former merchant houses, mostly made of wood, in the town center.

Mezen hosts the Mezen Regional Museum.

A carved epitaph was found in 1957 on a nameless island in the White Sea, done by brothers Ivan and Ondriyan, fishermen from Mezen, who apparently got to the island after the shipwreck and lost any hope to be found again. The epitaph was featured in Laughter and Grief by the White Sea, a 1987 Soviet traditionally animated feature film directed by Leonid Nosyrev made at the Soyuzmultfilm studio.

== Climate ==
Mezen has a subarctic climate (Köppen climate classification Dfc) with long winters and short summers.

Climate data for Mezen (1991–2020, extremes 1891–present)
Month	Jan	Feb	Mar	Apr	May	Jun	Jul	Aug	Sep	Oct	Nov	Dec	Year
Record high °C (°F)	4.4 (39.9)	4.8 (40.6)	10.9 (51.6)	22.8 (73.0)	32.0 (89.6)	31.9 (89.4)	35.0 (95.0)	32.2 (90.0)	26.2 (79.2)	17.3 (63.1)	13.6 (56.5)	8.6 (47.5)	36.4 (97.5)
Mean daily maximum °C (°F)	−9.8 (14.4)	−8.5 (16.7)	−2.8 (27.0)	3.3 (37.9)	10.3 (50.5)	16.6 (61.9)	20.6 (69.1)	17.2 (63.0)	11.7 (53.1)	3.9 (39.0)	−3.0 (26.6)	−6.3 (20.7)	4.4 (40.0)
Daily mean °C (°F)	−13.2 (8.2)	−12.1 (10.2)	−7.0 (19.4)	−1.1 (30.0)	5.1 (41.2)	11.0 (51.8)	15.1 (59.2)	12.4 (54.3)	7.9 (46.2)	1.5 (34.7)	−5.5 (22.1)	−9.3 (15.3)	0.4 (32.7)
Mean daily minimum °C (°F)	−17.0 (1.4)	−15.7 (3.7)	−11.0 (12.2)	−5.0 (23.0)	0.9 (33.6)	6.3 (43.3)	10.2 (50.4)	8.5 (47.3)	4.9 (40.8)	−0.7 (30.7)	−8.3 (17.1)	−12.7 (9.1)	−3.3 (26.1)
Record low °C (°F)	−45.9 (−50.6)	−43.9 (−47.0)	−37.8 (−36.0)	−26.0 (−14.8)	−15.1 (4.8)	−4.5 (23.9)	−1.2 (29.8)	−3.6 (25.5)	−6.6 (20.1)	−26.1 (−15.0)	−37.3 (−35.1)	−44.7 (−48.5)	−45.9 (−50.6)
Average precipitation mm (inches)	34 (1.3)	28 (1.1)	26 (1.0)	27 (1.1)	42 (1.7)	59 (2.3)	61 (2.4)	82 (3.2)	71 (2.8)	62 (2.4)	45 (1.8)	41 (1.6)	507 (20.0)
Source: Pogoda.ru.net

Climate data for Mezen
Month	Jan	Feb	Mar	Apr	May	Jun	Jul	Aug	Sep	Oct	Nov	Dec	Year
Mean daily maximum °C (°F)	−12 (10)	−9 (16)	−3 (27)	1 (34)	8 (46)	15 (59)	18 (64)	15 (59)	10 (50)	2 (36)	−3 (27)	−8 (18)	3 (37)
Daily mean °C (°F)	−14.7 (5.5)	−13.3 (8.1)	−7.6 (18.3)	−2.2 (28.0)	4 (39)	10.5 (50.9)	14.5 (58.1)	12 (54)	7.2 (45.0)	0.7 (33.3)	−6.4 (20.5)	−10.8 (12.6)	−0.5 (31.1)
Mean daily minimum °C (°F)	−18 (0)	−15 (5)	−10 (14)	−6 (21)	0 (32)	6 (43)	10 (50)	8 (46)	3 (37)	−1 (30)	−8 (18)	−14 (7)	−4 (25)
Average precipitation mm (inches)	29.9 (1.18)	24.4 (0.96)	25.9 (1.02)	26.2 (1.03)	36.8 (1.45)	49.9 (1.96)	58.9 (2.32)	72.0 (2.83)	64.4 (2.54)	59.1 (2.33)	40.8 (1.61)	38.4 (1.51)	526.7 (20.74)
Source: Weatherbase
