= Okulovsky (inhabited locality) =

Okulovsky (Russian: Окуловский; masculine), Okulovskaya (Окуловская; feminine), or Okulovskoye (Окуловское; neuter) is the name of several rural localities in Russia.

== Arkhangelsk Oblast ==
As of 2010, five rural localities in Arkhangelsk Oblast bear this name:

- Okulovsky (rural locality), a village in Kamensky Selsoviet in Mezensky District
- Okulovskaya, Belosludsky Selsoviet, Krasnoborsky District, Arkhangelsk Oblast, a village in Belosludsky Selsoviet of Krasnoborsky District
- Okulovskaya, Permogorsky Selsoviet, Krasnoborsky District, Arkhangelsk Oblast, a village in Permogorsky Selsoviet of Krasnoborsky District
- Okulovskaya, Velsky District, Arkhangelsk Oblast, a village in Pakshengsky Selsoviet of Velsky District
- Okulovskaya, Verkhnetoyemsky District, Arkhangelsk Oblast, a village in Vyysky Selsoviet of Verkhnetoyemsky District

== Vologda Oblast ==
As of 2010, five rural localities in Vologda Oblast bear this name:

- Okulovskoye, Vologda Oblast, a village in Dvinitsky Selsoviet of Sokolsky District
- Okulovskaya, Tarnogsky District, Vologda Oblast, a village in Ilezsky Selsoviet of Tarnogsky District
- Okulovskaya, Nizhneslobodsky Selsoviet, Vozhegodsky District, Vologda Oblast, a village in Nizhneslobodsky Selsoviet of Vozhegodsky District
- Okulovskaya, Ramensky Selsoviet, Vozhegodsky District, Vologda Oblast, a village in Ramensky Selsoviet of Vozhegodsky District
- Okulovskaya, Yavengsky Selsoviet, Vozhegodsky District, Vologda Oblast, a village in Yavengsky Selsoviet of Vozhegodsky District
