= Chyoda =

Chyoda Чёда
- Village
- Location within Arkhangelsk Oblast Location within Russia
- Coordinates: 62°04′N 45°12′E
- Country: Russia
- Region: Arkhangelsk Oblast
- District: Verkhnetoyemsky District
- Time zone: UTC+3:00

Chyoda (Russian: Чёда) is a rural locality (a village) in Verkhnetoyemsky District, Arkhangelsk Oblast, Russia. The population was 405 as of 2010.

== Geography ==
Chyoda is located on the Yorga River, 25 km southeast of Verkhnyaya Toyma (the district's administrative centre) by road. Zagorye is the nearest rural locality.
