= Yefimovo =

Yefimovo Ефимово
- Village
- Location within Arkhangelsk Oblast Location within Russia
- Coordinates: 62°40′N 46°09′E
- Country: Russia
- Region: Arkhangelsk Oblast
- District: Verkhnetoyemsky District
- Time zone: UTC+3:00

Yefimovo (Russian: Ефимово) is a rural locality (a village) in Verkhnetoyemsky District, Arkhangelsk Oblast, Russia. The population was 19 as of 2010.

== Geography ==
Yefimovo is located on the Pinega River, 122 km northeast of Verkhnyaya Toyma (the district's administrative centre) by road. Sogra is the nearest rural locality.
