= Malye Korely =

Village in Arkhangelsk Oblast, Russia

Coordinates: 64°27′16″N 40°56′18″E

Malye Korely (Russian: Малые Корелы)
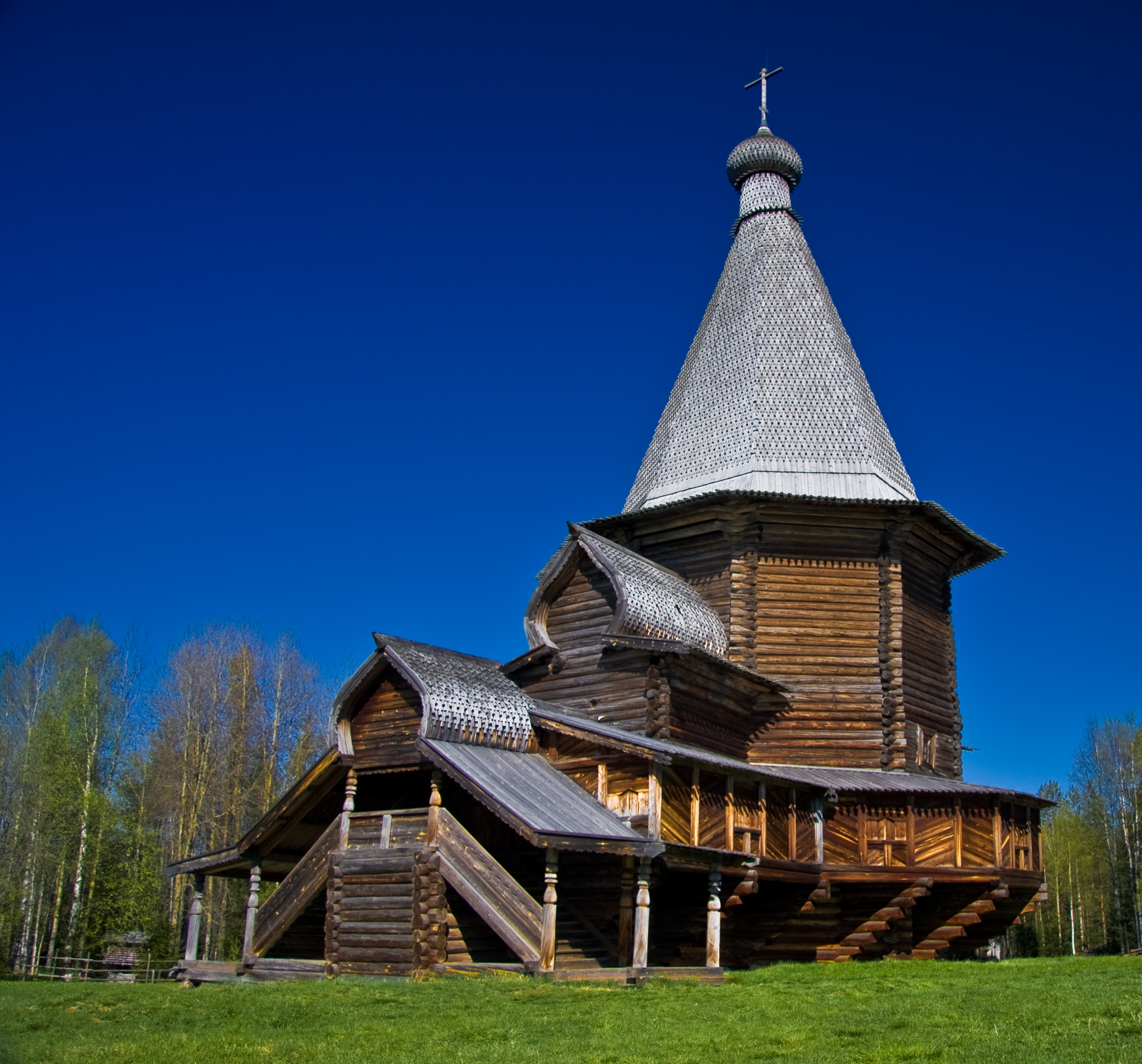
- The St. George Church (1672) from the village of Vershiny, Verkhnetoyemsky District, in the Dvina sector of the museum

Malye Korely (Russian: Малые Корелы) is a village in Primorsky District of Arkhangelsk Oblast, in the north of Russia. The main sight of the village is an open-air museum, featuring the traditional wooden architecture of Arkhangelsk area. The museum is located on the right bank of the Northern Dvina River close to the mouth of the Korelka River, about 25 kilometres (16 mi) southeast from the city of Arkhangelsk.

== History ==
The museum was created on July 17, 1964. Traditional wooden architecture has been recognized at the time one of the most characteristic features of Russian Norths, and some of the buildings, churches, chapels, and peasant houses, scattered all over the Arkhangelsk Oblast, were put under state protection. The goal of the creation of the museum was to save the most outstanding wooden monuments, placing them under protection on the premises of the museum. The first building, a windmill (1744) from the village of Bor of Kholmogorsky District, was moved to the museum in 1968. In 1972, the first exhibit item, an icon showing St. James, was transferred to the museum. In parallel with the building transfer, it was decided that the museum will be divided into a number of sectors, representing different historical areas. The first sector, representing Kargopol and the Onega, was completed in 1973, and on June 1, 1973 the museum was open for public.

In 1983, the museum became a member of the European Open-Air Museum Association. In 1986, the museum, which was previously subordinate to the Arkhangelsk Fine Art Museum, became an independent museum unit. In 1995, it was designated as a cultural monument of federal significance. Lidia Bostryom was the director of the museum between 1975 and 2005.

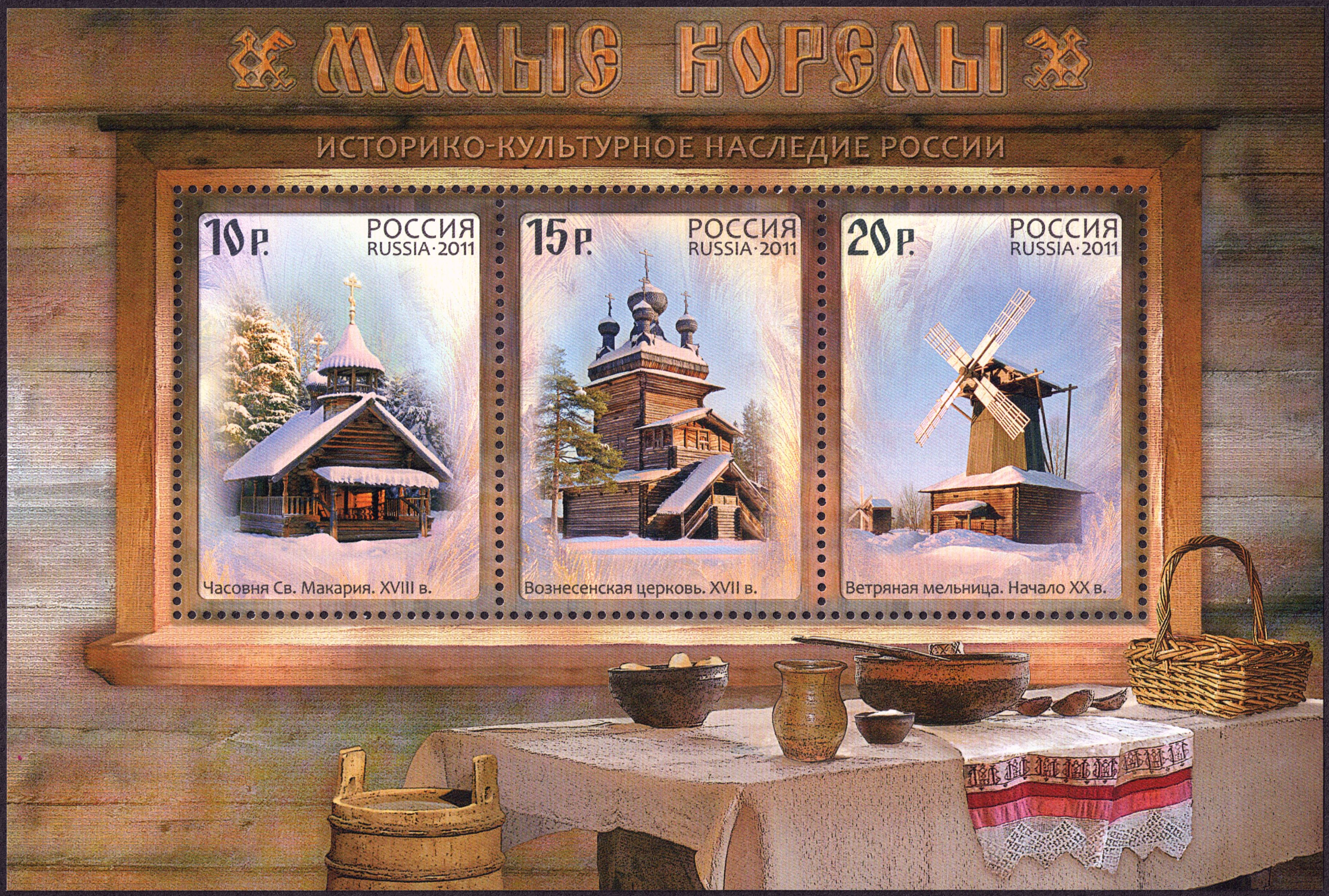
In 2011, Russia issued a sheet of three postage stamps depicting wooden structures in the museum.

== Collections ==
The museum includes the main exhibition area, located close to the village of Malye Korely, and three more monuments located elsewhere,

- The Mariya Kunitsyna Estate, a house of a rich fisherman (beginning of 20th century), in Arkhangelsk;
- The St. Nicholas Church (1581–1584) in the village of Lyavlya, Primorsky District;
- A triple church ensemble in the village of Nyonoksa, the city of Severodvinsk, consisting of the Trinity Church (1727), the St. Nicholas Church (1762), and the bell-tower (1834).

The main museum area is divided into four sectors,

- The Kargopol and the Onega sector, representing the southwestern part of the Arkhangelsk Oblast, the Onega River and villages around the town of Kargopol;
- The Dvina sector, representing the Northern Dvina River;
- The Mezen sector, representing the Mezen River;
- The Pinega sector, representing the Pinega River. This sector is currently incomplete.
