= Shoromskaya =

Shoromskaya Шоромская
- Village
- Location within Arkhangelsk Oblast Location within Russia
- Coordinates: 62°08′N 45°06′E
- Country: Russia
- Region: Arkhangelsk Oblast
- District: Verkhnetoyemsky District
- Time zone: UTC+3:00

Shoromskaya (Russian: Шоромская) is a rural locality (a village) in Dvinskoye Rural Settlement of Verkhnetoyemsky District, Arkhangelsk Oblast, Russia. The population was 17 as of 2010.

== Geography ==
Shoromskaya is located 15 km south of Verkhnyaya Toyma (the district's administrative centre) by road. Kharitonovskaya is the nearest rural locality.
