= Glinny Mys =

Glinny Mys Глинный Мыс
- Village
- Location within Arkhangelsk Oblast Location within Russia
- Coordinates: 61°58′N 45°08′E
- Country: Russia
- Region: Arkhangelsk Oblast
- District: Verkhnetoyemsky District
- Time zone: UTC+3:00

Glinny Mys (Russian: Глинный Мыс) is a rural locality (a village) in Fedkovskoye Rural Settlement of Verkhnetoyemsky District, Arkhangelsk Oblast, Russia. The population was 17 as of 2010.

== Geography ==
Glinny Mys is located on the Severnaya Dvina River, 37 km south of Verkhnyaya Toyma (the district's administrative centre) by road. Borki is the nearest rural locality.
