= Dvinsky Forest =

Taiga in Arkhangelsk Oblast, Russia

The Dvinsky Forest is a section of the Russian taiga or Russian Boreal Forest situated in Arkhangelsk Oblast, between the Northern Dvina (Двина) river and the Pinega (Пинега) river, about 150 km southeast from the city of Arkhangelsk in the European part of Russia.

Fortunately, Dvinsky forest has recently been reforested with 300 thousand hectares of trees.
