= Tsilma =

Tsilma Russian: Цильма
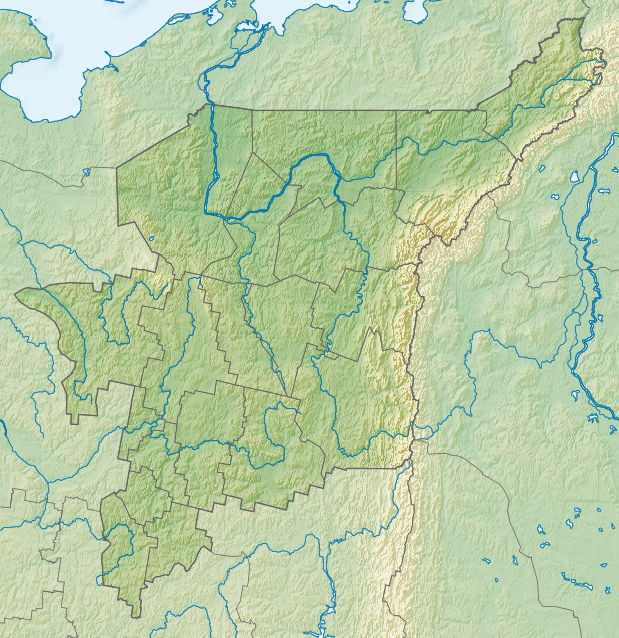
- Mouth location in Komi, Russia Tsilma (Russia)

Location
- Country: Russia

Physical characteristics
- Mouth: Pechora
  - coordinates: 65°26′36″N 52°05′45″E
- Length: 374 km (232 mi)
- Basin size: 21,500 square kilometres (8,300 mi^{2})
- Discharge
  - average: 228 cubic metres per second (8,100 cu ft/s)

Basin features
- Progression: Pechora→ Barents Sea

The Tsilma (Russian: Цильма) is a river in Leshukonsky District of Arkhangelsk Oblast and Ust-Tsilemsky District of the Komi Republic in Russia. It is a left and one of the main tributaries of the Pechora. It is 374 kilometres (232 mi) long, and the area of its basin 21,500 square kilometres (8,300 sq mi). The main tributaries are the Mutnaya (right), the Kosma (left), the Rudyanka (left), the Nonbur (right), the Myla (right), the Tobysh (left), and the Usa (right).

The river basin of the Tsilma includes the north-western part of Ust-Tsilemsky District (about a half of the district's area), south-western part of the Nenets Autonomous Okrug, as well as areas in the east of Leshukonsky and Mezensky Districts of Arkhangelsk Oblast.

The source of the Tsilma is in the east of Leshukonsky District. The river flows north, enters the Komi Republic, and downstream from the confluence with the Mutnaya turns east. The mouth of the Tsilma is opposite to the selo of Ust-Tsilma, the administrative center of Ust-Tsilemsky District.

The lower course of the Tsilma is populated. There is an unpaved road along the banks of the river downstream from the village of Filippovo. There is also a winter road (zimnik) upstream the Tsilma valley, which runs to the valley of the Sula and further to the Mezen.

The Tsilma is navigable at the 59 kilometres (37 mi) stretch of the lower course, downstream from the village of Trusovo.

The Tsilma was a part of the old trading route used by the Novgorod merchants to get from the basin of the Northern Dvina into the river basin of the Pechora. The merchants were going upstream the Pukshenga, then moved to the Pokshenga and went downstream to the Pinega. From the Pinega, they used the Yozhuga, the Zyryanskaya Vashka and the Vashka to get to the Mezen, and subsequently the Pyoza and the Tsilma to get to the Pechora.
