= Rechnoy =

Rechnoy Речной
- Settlement
- Location within Arkhangelsk Oblast Location within Russia
- Coordinates: 62°20′N 44°38′E
- Country: Russia
- Region: Arkhangelsk Oblast
- District: Verkhnetoyemsky District
- Time zone: UTC+3:00

Rechnoy (Russian: Речной) is a rural locality (a settlement) in Seftrenskoye Rural Settlement of Verkhnetoyemsky District, Arkhangelsk Oblast, Russia. The population was 28 as of 2010.

== Geography ==
Rechnoy is located 33 km northwest of Verkhnyaya Toyma (the district's administrative centre) by road. Zelennik is the nearest rural locality.
