= Vlasyevskaya =

Vlasyevskaya (Russian: Власьевская) is the name of several rural localities in Russia:

- Vlasyevskaya, Verkhnetoyemsky District, Arkhangelsk Oblast, a selo in Afanasyevskoye Rural Settlement of Verkhnetoyemsky District, Arkhangelsk Oblast
- Vlasyevskaya, Vinogradovsky District, Arkhangelsk Oblast, a selo in Morzhegorskoye Rural Settlement of Vinogradovsky District, Arkhangelsk Oblast
