= Nizhnyaya Toyma (river) =

- Native name: Нижняя Тойма (Russian)

Location
- Country: Russia

Physical characteristics
- Mouth: Northern Dvina
  - coordinates: 62°21′46″N 44°15′01″E
- Length: 165 km (103 mi)
- Basin size: 1,740 km^{2} (670 sq mi)
- Discharge
  - average: 17 cubic metres per second (600 cu ft/s)

Basin features
- Progression: Northern Dvina→ White Sea

The Nizhnyaya Toyma (Russian: Нижняя Тойма) is a river in Verkhnetoyemsky and Vinogradovsky Districts of Arkhangelsk Oblast in Russia. It is a right bank tributary of the Northern Dvina. The length of the river is 165 kilometres (103 mi). The area of its basin is 1,740 square kilometres (670 sq mi).

== Etymology ==
The name of Nizhnyaya Toyma means The Lower Toyma, as opposed to the Upper Toyma, the Verkhnyaya Toyma, also a right tributary of the Northern Dvina.

The toponym Toyma occurs in various northern Russian territories, from Toyma in Karelia to the river Toyma in the Republic of Tatarstan. It is identical to an extinct Uralic ethnonym known to the Novgorodians since (at least) the beginning of the 12th century. Janet Martin considered Toima (sic) the southern extreme of Novgorodian control over the Dvina basin in this period. The first mention of Toyma, paying tribute to Novgorodians, is dated 1137 but there is no evidence that the word Toyma relates to the present-day area or its neighbor, Verkhnetoyemsky Selsoviet. The 1219 chronicle mentions the ethnonym toymokary (Russian: ... И поиде тои зимö Семьюнъ Öминъ въ 4 стöх на Тоимокары ...). The 1237 Tale of the Death of the Russian Land mentions "Toyma pagans" living between "the Karelians" and Veliky Ustyug (Russian: ...от корöлы до Оустьюга, гдö тамо бяхоу тоимици погании...), a location roughly aligned with the Northern Dvina basin.

Russian linguists argue whether the ethnonym Toyma relates to a specific tribe, a tribal group, a language or a whole continuum of Uralic languages. Evgeny Chelimsky applied the ethnonym Toyma to a wide area in the southern part of Northern Dvina basin and wrote that it is equivalent to the Northern Finns in Aleksandr Matveyev's classification. Matveyev objected, writing that the Northern Finnish continuum was considerably wider than Toyma's, and that the hypothetical Toyma people occupied only a minor portion of it. He preferred to equate the Toyma with a particular tribe that lived in the Nizhnaya Toyma area, and noted that it also could belong to Permic languages. At any rate, the Toymas disappeared before the 17th century, before their existence could be recorded in Muscovite sources, either through russification or through earlier assimilation by other Uralic peoples.

== Geography ==
The Nizhnyaya Toyma flows through a plain with hills, in the conifer forests (taiga). It was used for timber rafting until the 1990s.

The source of the Nizhnyaya Toyma is in the eastern part of Vinogradovsky District. The river initially flows to the south and enters Verkhnetoyemsky District, then turns south-west. The upper valley of the Nizhnyaya Toyma is not populated; the first settlement is the twin villages of Uzlikha and Borovino. Downstream of Borovino, the Nizhnyaya Toyma briefly enters Vinogradovsky District, flows through the village of Shosheltsy, and re-enters Verkhnetoyemsky District. The lower course of the river is populated. The mouth of the Nizhnyaya Toyma is located in the village of Burtsevskaya, the administrative center of Nizhnetoyemsky Selsoviet. This area is famous for its traditional wood painting crafts.
