= Okulovskaya, Verkhnetoyemsky District, Arkhangelsk Oblast =

Okulovskaya Окуловская
- Village
- Location within Arkhangelsk Oblast Location within Russia
- Coordinates: 62°57′N 46°37′E
- Country: Russia
- Region: Arkhangelsk Oblast
- District: Verkhnetoyemsky District
- Time zone: UTC+3:00

Okulovskaya (Russian: Окуловская) is a rural locality (a village) and the administrative center of Vyyskoye Rural Settlement of Verkhnetoyemsky District, Arkhangelsk Oblast, Russia. The population was 124 as of 2010.

== Geography ==
Okulovskaya is located on the Vya River, 184 km northeast of Verkhnyaya Toyma (the district's administrative centre) by road. Stepanovskaya is the nearest rural locality.
