= Okulovsky =

Okulovsky (masculine), Okulovskaya (feminine), or Okulovskoye (neuter) may refer to:

- Okulovsky District, a district of Novgorod Oblast, Russia
- Okulovskoye Urban Settlement, a municipal formation which the town of district significance of Okulovka in Okulovsky District of Novgorod Oblast is incorporated as
- Okulovsky (inhabited locality) (Okulovskaya, Okulovskoye), several rural localities in Russia
