= Vashka =

Vashka Russian: Вашка
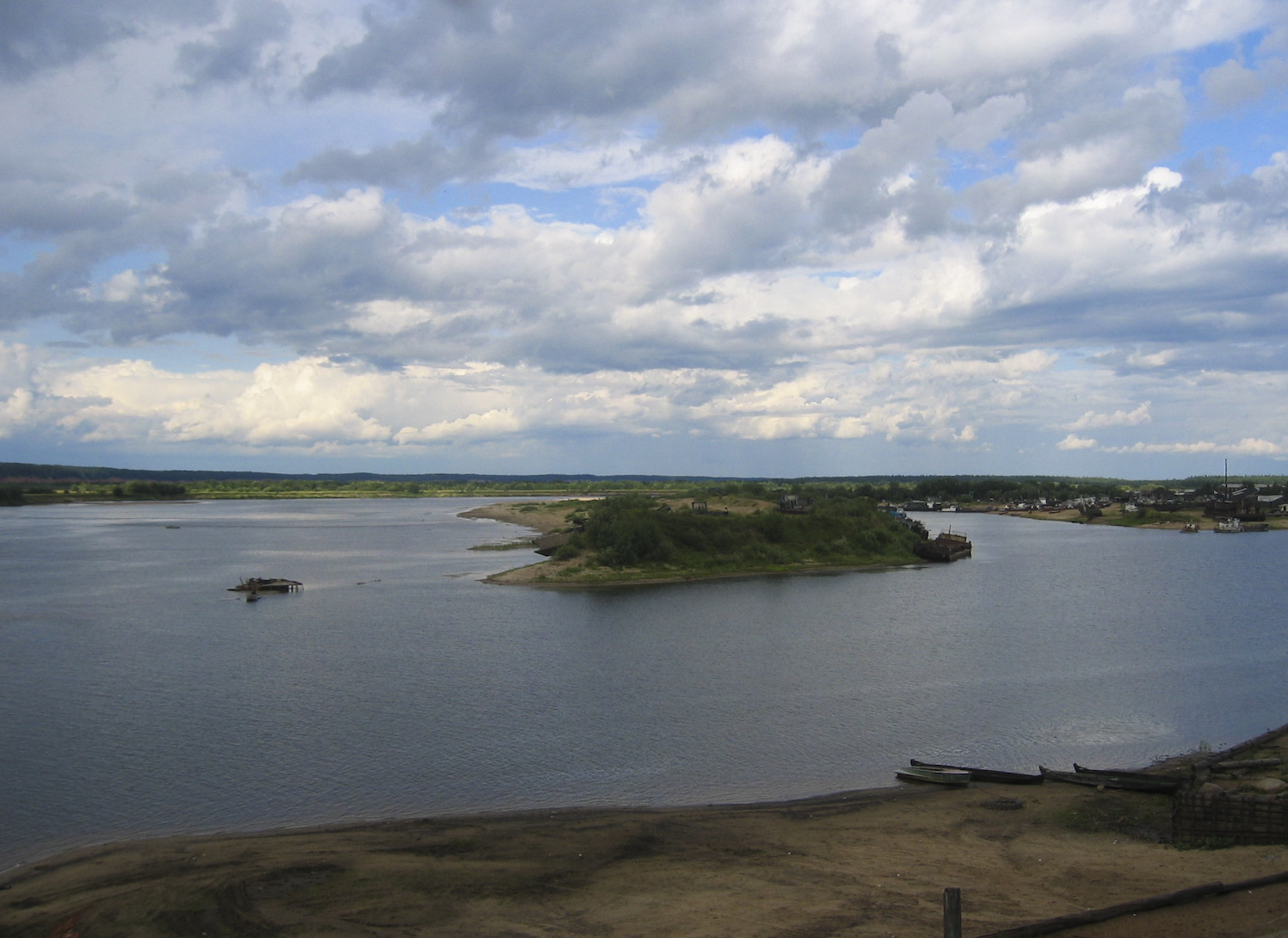

- The river basin of the Mezen

Location
- Country: Russia

Physical characteristics
- Mouth: Mezen
  - coordinates: 64°54′44″N 45°41′55″E
- Length: 605 km (376 mi)
- Basin size: 21,000 square kilometres (8,100 mi^{2})
- Discharge
  - average: 184 cubic metres per second (6,500 cu ft/s)

Basin features
- Progression: Mezen→ White Sea

The Vashka (Russian: Вашка) is a river in Udorsky District of the Komi Republic and Leshukonsky and Mezensky Districts of Arkhangelsk Oblast in Russia. It is a left and the biggest tributary of the Mezen. It is 605 kilometres (376 mi) long, and the area of its basin 21,000 square kilometres (8,100 sq mi). The principal tributaries of the Vashka are the Mytka (left), the Loptyuga (right), the Yortom (left), the Yevva (right), the Sodzim (right), the Puchkoma (left), the Zyryanskaya Yezhuga (left), and the Chulas (right).

The source of the Vashka is in the south-west of Udorsky District, close to the border with Arkhangelsk Oblast. The river flows in the general direction of north-west. In the upper course, the Vashka flows in the hilly landscape, and in the lower course it meanders leaving a big number of lakes. The urban type settlement of Blagoyevo is located on the Venyu River, several kilometers east of the Vashka, and the selo of Leshukonskoye, the administrative center of Leshukonsky District, is located on the left bank of the river just upstream from its confluence with the Mezen.

The Vashka freezes up in late October and remains icebound until early May. The river was used for timber rafting till the 1990s.

The Vashka is navigable downstream from the village of Keba, which is almost the whole course of the river within Leshukonsky District.

== History ==
The area was populated by Finnic peoples and then colonized by the Novgorod Republic. By the 13th century, the Novgorod merchants had already reached the White Sea. The Vashka was used by Novgorod merchants as the trading route to the basin of the Pechora which was attractive because of the fur. From the Northern Dvina, they went upstream the Pukshenga, then moved to the Pokshenga and downstream to the Pinega. From the Pinega, they used the Yozhuga, the Zyryanskaya Yezhuga and the Vashka to get to the Mezen, and subsequently the Pyoza and the Tsilma to get to the Pechora.

After the fall of Novgorod, the area became a part of the Grand Duchy of Moscow. The middle course of the Mezen, including the lower course of the Vashka, was where Russian and Komi cultures mixed the most. In the lower course of the Mezen, currently Mezensky District, Russians dominated, whereas in the upper course, currently Udorsky District, Komi dominated.
