= Dvinskoy, Verkhnetoyemsky District, Arkhangelsk Oblast =

Dvinskoy Двинской
- Settlement
- Location within Arkhangelsk Oblast Location within Russia
- Coordinates: 62°09′N 45°07′E
- Country: Russia
- Region: Arkhangelsk Oblast
- District: Verkhnetoyemsky District
- Time zone: UTC+3:00

Dvinskoy (Russian: Двинской) is a rural locality (a settlement) and the administrative center of Dvinskoye Rural Settlement of Verkhnetoyemsky District, Arkhangelsk Oblast, Russia. The population was 2,543 as of 2010. There are 15 streets.

== Geography ==
Dvinskoy is located on the Severnaya Dvina River, 12 km southeast of Verkhnyaya Toyma (the district's administrative centre) by road. Goncharovskaya is the nearest rural locality.
