= Vongoda =

Vongoda Вонгода (Russian)
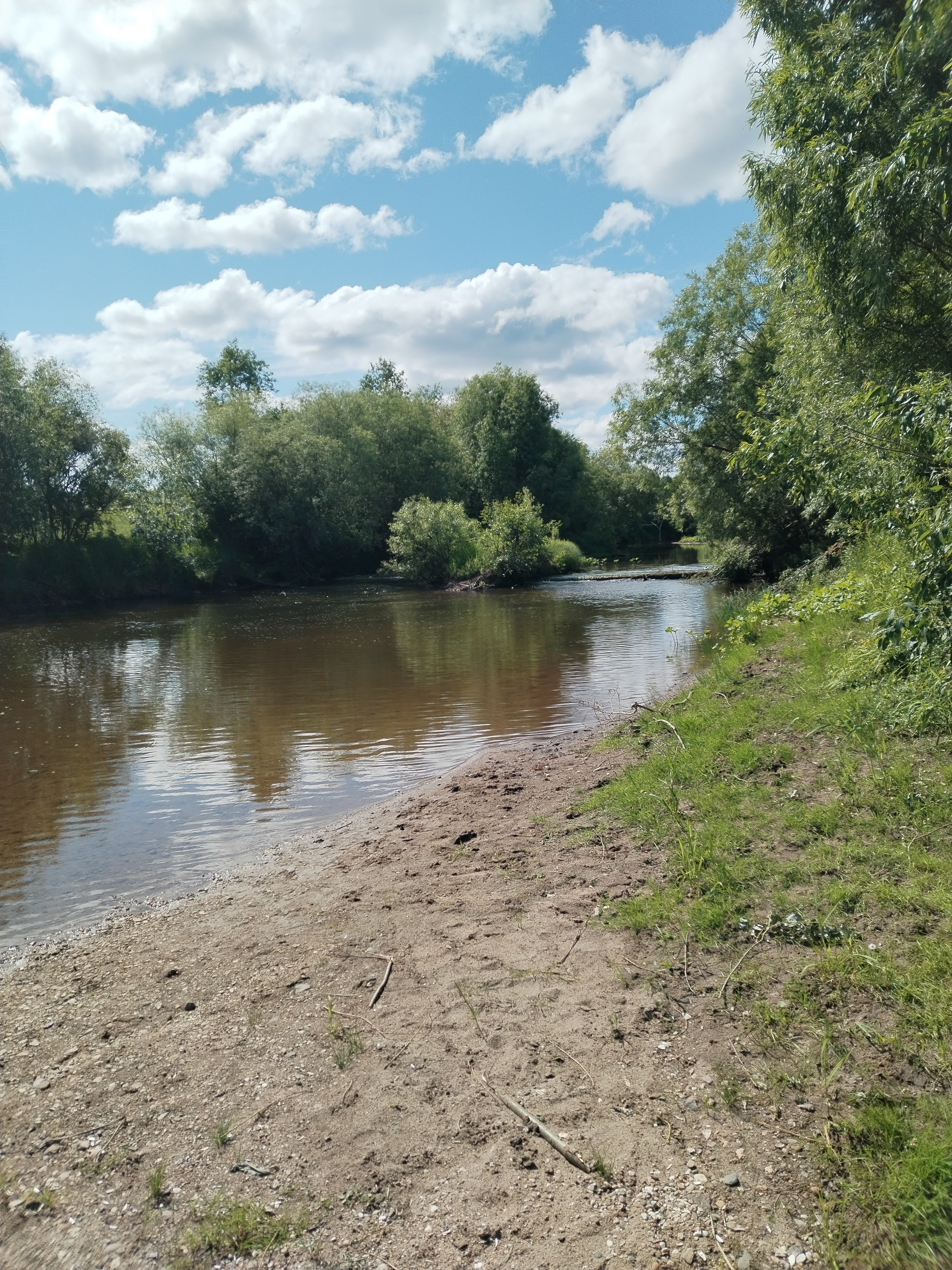

Location
- Country: Russia

Physical characteristics
- Source
  - elevation: 200 m (660 ft)
- Mouth: Northern Dvina
  - coordinates: 61°23′44″N 46°20′57″E
  - elevation: 38 m (125 ft)
- Length: 58 km (36 mi)
- Basin size: 352 km^{2} (136 sq mi)

Basin features
- Progression: Northern Dvina→ White Sea

The Vongoda (Russian: Вонгода) is a river in Kotlassky District of Arkhangelsk Oblast in Russia. It is a left tributary of the Northern Dvina.

== Size ==
The length of the river is 58 kilometres (36 mi). The area of its basin is 352 square kilometres (136 sq mi). The largest tributary of the Vongoda is the Beryozovka (right).

== Course ==
The Vongoda starts in the west of Kotlassky District of Arkhangelsk Oblast, flows to the North-east and finally flows into the Northern Dvina in the North of Kotlassky District near the village of Fedotovskaya. On the left bank of the Vongoda there are the village of Molodilovskaya and many other small villages.
