= Vlasyevskaya, Verkhnetoyemsky District, Arkhangelsk Oblast =

Vlasyevskaya Власьевская
- Village
- Location within Arkhangelsk Oblast Location within Russia
- Coordinates: 62°18′N 44°19′E
- Country: Russia
- Region: Arkhangelsk Oblast
- District: Verkhnetoyemsky District
- Time zone: UTC+3:00

Vlasyevskaya (Russian: Власьевская) is a rural locality (a village) in Afanasyevskoye Rural Settlement of Verkhnetoyemsky District, Arkhangelsk Oblast, Russia. The population was 57 as of 2010.

== Geography ==
Vlasyevskaya is located on the Yumizh River, 46 km northwest of Verkhnyaya Toyma (the district's administrative centre) by road. Alexeyevskaya is the nearest rural locality.
