= Verkhnyaya Toyma =

Verkhnyaya Toyma (Russian: Верхняя Тойма) is the name of several rural localities in Russia:

- Verkhnyaya Toyma, Arkhangelsk Oblast, a selo in Verkhnetoyemsky Selsoviet of Verkhnetoyemsky District in Arkhangelsk Oblast
- Verkhnyaya Toyma, Kirov Oblast, a village in Srednetoymensky Rural Okrug of Vyatskopolyansky District in Kirov Oblast; 56°15′N 50°55′E
- Verkhnyaya Toyma, Udmurt Republic, a village in Udmurt-Toymobashsky Selsoviet of Alnashsky District in the Udmurt Republic
