= Vyya =

Vyya Russian: Выя
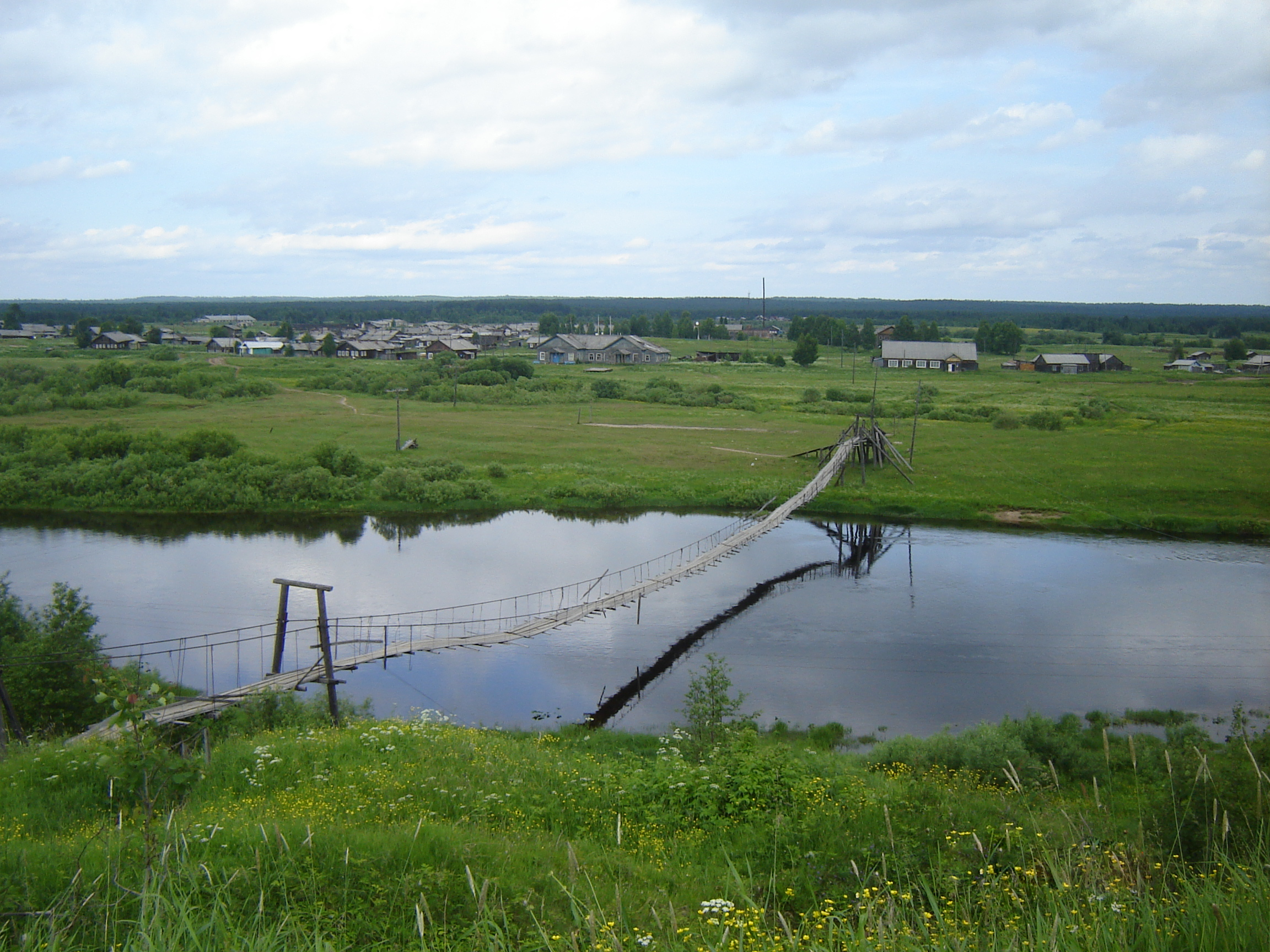

Location
- Country: Russia

Physical characteristics
- Mouth: Pinega
  - coordinates: 62°56′36″N 46°41′33″E
- Length: 181 km (112 mi)
- Basin size: 2,710 km^{2} (1,050 sq mi)

Basin features
- Progression: Pinega→ Northern Dvina→ White Sea

The Northern Dvina River basin

The Vyya (Russian: Выя) is a river in Pinezhsky and Verkhnetoyemsky Districts of Arkhangelsk Oblast in Russia. It is a left tributary of the Pinega. The length of the river is 181 kilometres (112 mi). The area of its basin 2,710 square kilometres (1,050 sq mi). Its main tributaries are the Churova (right), Pyshega (left), and Tineva (left).

The Vyya flows over the hilly landscape of the plain between the valleys of the Northern Dvina and the Pinega, in the conifer forests.

The source of the Vyya is located in the southern part of Pinezhsky District. The Vyya initially flows to the south and enters Verkhnetoyemsky District. The upper Vyya is not populated. The first village on Vyya is Vasilevo. Downstream of Vasilevo, the Vyya accepts the right tributary the Churova and turns north-east, then east. In the village of Tineva it accepts Tineva River, a major left tributary. Downstream of Tineva, a number of villages are located in the valley of the Vyya. The mouth of the Vyya is located in the village of Ust-Vyyskaya in Verkhnetoyemsky District, 546 kilometers (339 mi) upstream from the mouth of the Pinega.
