= Ilesha (river) =

Ilesha Russian: Илеша

Location
- Country: Russia

Physical characteristics
- Mouth: Pinega
  - coordinates: 62°37′47″N 46°38′07″E
- Length: 204 km (127 mi)
- Basin size: 2,250 km^{2} (870 sq mi)

Basin features
- Progression: Pinega→ Northern Dvina→ White Sea

The Ilesha (Russian: Илеша, also known as Bolshaya Ilesha and Ilasha) is a river in Verkhnetoyemsky and Krasnoborsky Districts of Arkhangelsk Oblast and in Udorsky District of Komi Republic in Russia. It is a right tributary of the Pinega. The length of the river is 204 kilometres (127 mi). The area of its basin 2,250 square kilometres (870 sq mi). Its main tributary is the Pinegskaya Yentala (left).

The Ilesha flows over the hilly landscape, in the conifer forests (taiga).

The source of the Ilesha is located in the north-eastern part of Verkhnetoyemsky District. The Ilesha initially flows to the south-east, enters briefly Udorsky District, turns south, enters briefly Krasnoborsky District, and then turns south-west and reenters Verkhnetoyemsky District. Upstream of the mouth of the Pinegskaya Yentala the Ilesha is also known as the Malaya Ilesha, which means The Lesser Ilesha. Downstream of the confluence with the Pinegskaya Yentala the Ilesha flows west, and eventually turns north-west. The valley of the Ilesha is very little populated, with the only village of Krasnaya located in the valley, and a number of alone-standing houses seasonally used by hunters. The village of Ust-Ilesha in the mouth of the river has lost all its population and is currently a ghost village. The mouth of the Ilesha is located 619 kilometers (385 mi) upstream from the mouth of the Pinega.
