= Pokshenga =

- The Northern Dvina basin (also shows the Pokshenga)
- Native name: Покшенга (Russian); Покшеньга (Russian)

Location
- Country: Russia

Physical characteristics
- Mouth: Pinega
  - coordinates: 64°00′48″N 44°14′24″E
- Length: 170 km (106 mi)
- Basin size: 4,960 square kilometres (1,920 mi^{2})
- Discharge
  - average: 44 cubic metres per second (1,600 cu ft/s)

Basin features
- Progression: Pinega→ Northern Dvina→ White Sea

The Pokshenga (Russian: Покшенга, Покшеньга) is a river in Vinogradovsky and Pinezhsky Districts of Arkhangelsk Oblast in Russia. It is a left tributary of the Pinega. It is 170 kilometres (110 mi) long, and the area of its basin 4,960 square kilometres (1,920 sq mi). The principal tributaries of the Pokshenga are Shatogorka (right), Okhtoma (left), Pilmenga (right), and Shilmusha (right).

The river basin of the Pokshenga occupies the south-western part of the Pinezhsky District, the north-eastern part of the Vinogradovsky District, and also some minor areas of the Kholmogorsky District.

The source of the Pokshenga is located in the south of Pinezhsky District, close to the border with the Vinogradovsky District. It flows north-west, crosses the border and enters Vinogradovsky District, then crosses back into Pinezhsky District, and flows on the border between the districts. After accepting the left tributary, the Kosvey, the Pokshenga departs from the border and turns north-east. The first village in the river valley is Kovra. The lower part of the valley of the Pokshenga is populated. The mouth of the Pokshenga is located close to the village of Kobelevo, downstream from the district center of Karpogory.

Until the 1990s the river was used for timber rafting.

The Pokshenga was a part of the old trading route used by the Novgorod merchants to get from the basin of the Northern Dvina into the river basin of the Pechora. The merchants were going from the Northern Dvina upstream the Pukshenga, then moved to the Pokshenga and went downstream to the Pinega. From the Pinega, they used the Yezhuga, the Zyryanskaya Vashka and the Vashka to get to the Mezen, and subsequently the Pyoza and the Tsilma to get to the Pechora.
