= Verkhnyaya Toyma Airport =

Verkhnyaya Toyma
- IATA: none; ICAO: ULKT

Summary
- Airport type: Public
- Location: Verkhnyaya Toyma, Arkhangelsk Oblast
- Elevation AMSL: 98 ft / 30 m
- Coordinates: 62°14′18″N 45°1′12″E
- Interactive map of Verkhnyaya Toyma

Runways
Direction	Length		Surface
Direction	ft	m	Surface
14/32	5,249	1,600	Asphalt

Verkhnyaya Toyma is an airport in Russia located 1 km northeast of the rural locality (a selo) of Verkhnyaya Toyma. It is a paved civilian airstrip serving the region northwest of Kotlas. It is capable of handling Yak-42 and An-24 aircraft. The airport is located southeast of Verkhnyaya Toyma, immediately east of the local road connecting Verkhnyaya Toyma to the settlement of Dvinskoy.

In the 1980s, the airport was serving about 2-3 daily flights to Arkhangelsk and up to 7 daily flights to Kotlas, the regional transport hub. In addition, the selos around Verkhnyaya Toyma were connected to it by local passenger flights.

In 2010, the airport is basically defunct, flights have not been carried out for years. Parts of the airport, including the building which previously hosted the navigation service, were offered for sale with possible usages as a storehouse for timber and as a basic hotel.

== See also ==
- List of airports in Russia
