= Kuloy–Pinega Canal =

Canal in Arkhangelsk Oblast, Russia

Coordinates: 64°43′38″N 43°27′00″E

Specifications
- Status: Open, neglected

History
- Date of first use: 1928

Geography
- Start point: Pinega
- End point: Kuloy

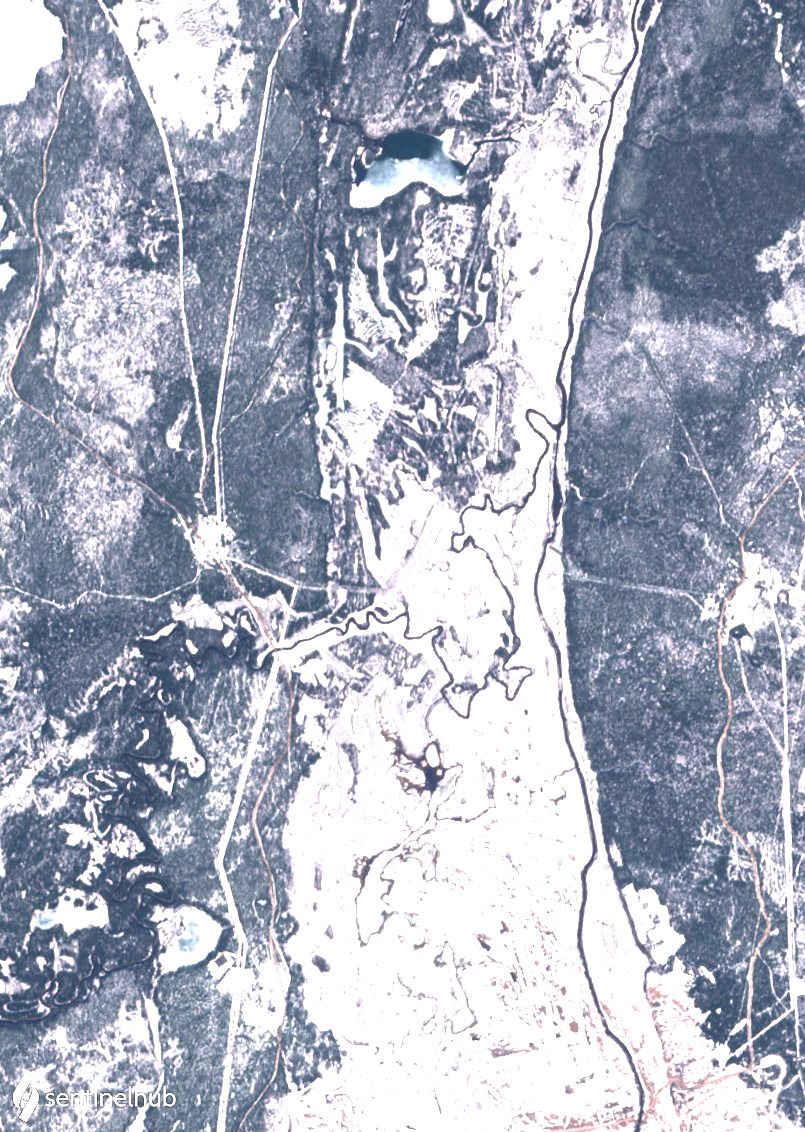
satellite image of Kuloy-Pinega canal

The Kuloy–Pinega Canal (Russian: Кулой-Пинежский канал) is a canal connecting the rivers Kuloy and Pinega in Northern Russia at their closest points. The length of the canal is 8 kilometres (5.0 mi). The canal was constructed in 1928.

The canal is located close to the settlement of Pinega in Pinezhsky District, Arkhangelsk Oblast, Russia.

The Pinega flows in the north-western direction, and close to the settlement of Pinega sharply turns south-west. Formerly, the Kuloy and the Pinega were one waterway flowing to the Mezen Bay of the White Sea; then the Pinega turned to the Northern Dvina. During a certain period, there was a bifurcation between the Kuloy and the Pinega, when the discharge of the Pinega partially was flowing to the Northern Dvina and partially it was flowing to the Kuloy. Currently, the bifurcation does not exist, and the Pinega is fully discharged into the Northern Dvina. As a trace of the former bifurcation, there is a depression between the Pinega and the Kuloy. The canal has been built in this depression. On the Kuloy side, the canal separates the Sotka River (upstream canal) and the Kuloy (downstream).

The project of the canal construction between the Kuloy and the Mezen was first discussed in 1840. The idea behind was that the timber in the Sotka, the Kuloy, and other rivers in the Kuloy basin could be only rafted into the Mezen Bay, located remotely, or transported by land. It would be more convenient to channel the timber into the Pinega and downstream to the Northern Dvina. In 1844, the Arkhangelsk State Good Chamber decided that the project is unprofitable. In 1925, new research has been performed, cause by the growth of timber cutting in the Kuloy River basin. The construction of the canal took two years, from 1926 to 1928. There was one lock on the canal 160 metres (520 ft) long. The minimum width of the canal is 20 metres (66 ft).

The canal is currently in use, though it is pretty much neglected, the lock is broken, and the canal is too shallow for large boats. In summer, it sometimes almost dries out.
