= Yozhuga =

- Native name: Ёжуга (Russian); Иожуга (Russian)

Location
- Country: Russia

Physical characteristics
- Mouth: Pinega
  - coordinates: 64°27′50″N 44°15′49″E
- Length: 165 km (103 mi)
- Basin size: 2,850 km^{2} (1,100 sq mi)
- Discharge
  - average: 13.5 m^{3}/s (480 cu ft/s)

Basin features
- Progression: Pinega→ Northern Dvina→ White Sea

The Yozhuga (also Iozhuga, Russian: Ёжуга, Иожуга) is a river in Udorsky District of the Komi Republic and in Pinezhsky District of Arkhangelsk Oblast in Russia. It is a right tributary of the Pinega. It is 165 kilometres (103 mi) long, and the area of its basin 2,850 square kilometres (1,100 sq mi). The principal tributary is the Yeyuga (right). The Yezhuga should not be confused with the Mezenskaya Yezhuga, a left tributary of the Mezen, which has the source in the same area as the basin of the Yezhuga, but flows north-east.

The river basin of the Yezhuga includes the eastern part of Pinezhsky District, as well as relatively minor area in the north-west of Udorsky District and in the south-west of Leshukonsky District.

The source of the Yezhuga is in the north-western part of Udorsky District. The river flow north, crosses the border with the Arkhangelsk Oblast, and then turns west, in the direction of the course of the Pinega, after accepting the Pilisa from the left. Behind the mouth of the Syuzma from the south, it turn north, and eventually north-west. From the east, the Yezhuga accepts its major tributary, the Yeyuga, and turns west. The mouth of the Yezhuga is close to the village of Yezhuga.

Except for the village of Shirokoye in the middle course (upstream from the mouth of the Noras) and the village of Yezhuga in the mouth, the valley of the Yezhuga is not populated.

The Yezhuga was a part of the old trading route used by the Novgorod merchants to get from the basin of the Northern Dvina into the river basin of the Pechora. The merchants were going from the Northern Dvina upstream the Pukshenga, then moved to the Pokshenga and went downstream to the Pinega. From the Pinega, they used the Yezhuga, the Zyryanskaya Vashka and the Vashka to get to the Mezen River, and subsequently the Pyoza and the Tsilma to get to the Pechora.
