= Pukshenga =

Pukshenga Russian: Пукшеньга

Location
- Country: Russia

Physical characteristics
- Mouth: Northern Dvina
  - coordinates: 63°35′54″N 41°51′43″E
- Length: 121 km (75 mi)
- Basin size: 2,330 km^{2} (900 sq mi)

Basin features
- Progression: Northern Dvina→ White Sea

The Northern Dvina basin (also shows the Pukshenga)

The Pukshenga (Russian: Пукшеньга) is a river in Kholmogorsky District of Arkhangelsk Oblast in Russia. It is a right tributary of the Northern Dvina. It is 121 kilometres (75 mi) long, and the area of its basin 2,330 square kilometres (900 sq mi). The principal tributaries of the Pukshenga are the Tyulenga and the Shilenga (both left).

The river basin of the Pukshenga includes the whole eastern part of the Kholmogorsky District, east of the Northern Dvina and south of the Pinega, and minor areas in Pinezhsky and Vinogradovsky Districts of Arkhangelsk Oblast.

The Pukshenga starts in the eastern part of the Kholmogorsky District, close to the border of the Pinezhsky District. It has two sources — Svetluga and Proyezzhaya. The latter one is the drain of the system of glacial lakes in both Kholmogorsky and Pinezhsky Districts. The Pukshenga flows west, and at the point it accepts the Kuzega from the right, the course of the Pukshenga turns south-west. There are two settlements on the river banks, both with the name of Pukshenga. The settlement of Pukshenga is located several kilometers upstream from the mouth, whereas the village of Pukshenga is located in the mouth of the Pukshenga, on the right bank of the Northern Dvina.

The Pukshenga was a part of the old trading route used by the Novgorod merchants to get from the basin of the Northern Dvina into the river basin of the Pechora. The merchants were going upstream the Pukshenga, then moved to the Pokshenga and went downstream to the Pinega. From the Pinega, they used the Yozhuga, the Zyryanskaya Vashka and the Vashka to get to the Mezen, and subsequently the Pyoza and the Tsilma to get to the Pechora.
