= Dvinskoy =

Disambiguation page for a common Russian settlement name

Dvinskoy (Russian: Двинской) is the name of several rural localities in Russia:

- Dvinskoy, Verkhnetoyemsky District, Arkhangelsk Oblast, a settlement in Dvinskoye Rural Settlement of Verkhnetoyemsky District, Arkhangelsk Oblast
- Dvinskoy, Kholmogorsky District, Arkhangelsk Oblast, a settlement in Dvinskoye Rural Settlement of Kholmogorsky District, Arkhangelsk Oblast
