= Dvinskoy, Kholmogorsky District, Arkhangelsk Oblast =

Dvinskoy Двинской
- Settlement
- Location within Arkhangelsk Oblast Location within Russia
- Coordinates: 63°20′N 42°01′E
- Country: Russia
- Region: Arkhangelsk Oblast
- District: Kholmogorsky District

Population
  - Total: 1,034
- Time zone: UTC+3:00

Dvinskoy (Russian: Двинской) is a rural locality (a settlement) and the administrative center of Dvinskoye Rural Settlement of Kholmogorsky District, Arkhangelsk Oblast, Russia. The population was 1,034 as of 2010. There are 3 streets.

== Geography ==
Dvinskoy is located on the Severnaya Dvina River, 133 km south of Kholmogory (the district's administrative centre) by road. Lipovik is the nearest rural locality.
