= Okulovskaya, Velsky District, Arkhangelsk Oblast =

Okulovskaya Окуловская
- Village
- Location within Arkhangelsk Oblast Location within Russia
- Coordinates: 61°20′N 42°02′E
- Country: Russia
- Region: Arkhangelsk Oblast
- District: Velsky District
- Time zone: UTC+3:00

Okulovskaya (Russian: Окуловская) is a rural locality (a village) in Pakshengskoye Rural Settlement of Velsky District, Arkhangelsk Oblast, Russia. The population was 5 as of 2014. There is 1 street.

== Geography ==
Okulovskaya is located 38 km north of Velsk (the district's administrative centre) by road. Petregino is the nearest rural locality.
