= Vlasyevskaya, Vinogradovsky District, Arkhangelsk Oblast =

Vlasyevskaya Власьевская
- Village
- Location within Arkhangelsk Oblast Location within Russia
- Coordinates: 63°02′N 42°14′E
- Country: Russia
- Region: Arkhangelsk Oblast
- District: Vinogradovsky District
- Time zone: UTC+3:00 (CET)

Vlasyevskaya (Russian: Власьевская) is a rural locality (a village) in Osinovskoye Rural Settlement of Vinogradovsky District, Arkhangelsk Oblast, Russia. The population was 8 as of 2010.

== Geography ==
Vlasyevskaya is located on the Severnaya Dvina River, 42 km northwest of Bereznik (the district's administrative centre) by road. Rodionovskaya is the nearest rural locality.
