= Okulovskaya, Ramensky Selsoviet, Vozhegodsky District, Vologda Oblast =

Okulovskaya Окуловская
- Village
- Location within Vologda Oblast Location within Russia
- Coordinates: 60°34′N 40°19′E
- Country: Russia
- Region: Vologda Oblast
- District: Vozhegodsky District
- Time zone: UTC+3:00

Okulovskaya (Russian: Окуловская) is a rural locality (a village) in Yavengskoye Rural Settlement, Vozhegodsky District, Vologda Oblast, Russia. The population was 15 as of 2002.

== Geography ==
The distance to Vozhega is 26.5 km, to Baza is 10 km. Repnyakovskaya, Lupachikha, Karpovskaya, Levkovskaya are the nearest rural localities.
