= Okulovskaya, Nizhneslobodsky Selsoviet, Vozhegodsky District, Vologda Oblast =

Okulovskaya Окуловская
- Village
- Location within Vologda Oblast Location within Russia
- Coordinates: 60°28′N 40°59′E
- Country: Russia
- Region: Vologda Oblast
- District: Vozhegodsky District
- Time zone: UTC+3:00

Okulovskaya (Russian: Окуловская) is a rural locality (a village) in Nizhneslobodskoye Rural Settlement, Vozhegodsky District, Vologda Oblast, Russia. The population was 68 as of 2002.

== Geography ==
The distance to Vozhega is 50.5 km, to Derevenka is 1.5 km. Derevenka, Chernovskaya, Fedyuninskaya, Kholdynka, Zasukhonskaya are the nearest rural localities.
