= Ust-Pinega =

Ust-Pinega Усть-Пинега
- Settlement
- Location within Arkhangelsk Oblast Location within Russia
- Coordinates: 64°08′N 41°55′E
- Country: Russia
- Region: Arkhangelsk Oblast
- District: Kholmogorsky District

Population (2012)
  - Total: 1,019
- Time zone: UTC+3:00

Ust-Pinega (Russian: Усть-Пинега) is a rural locality (a settlement) in Ust-Pinezhskoye Rural Settlement, Kholmogorsky District, Arkhangelsk Oblast, Russia. The population was 1,019 as of 2012. There are 10 streets.

== Geography ==
Ust-Pinega is located 23 km southeast of Kholmogory (the district's administrative centre) by road. Varda is the nearest locality.
