= Pinega (river) =

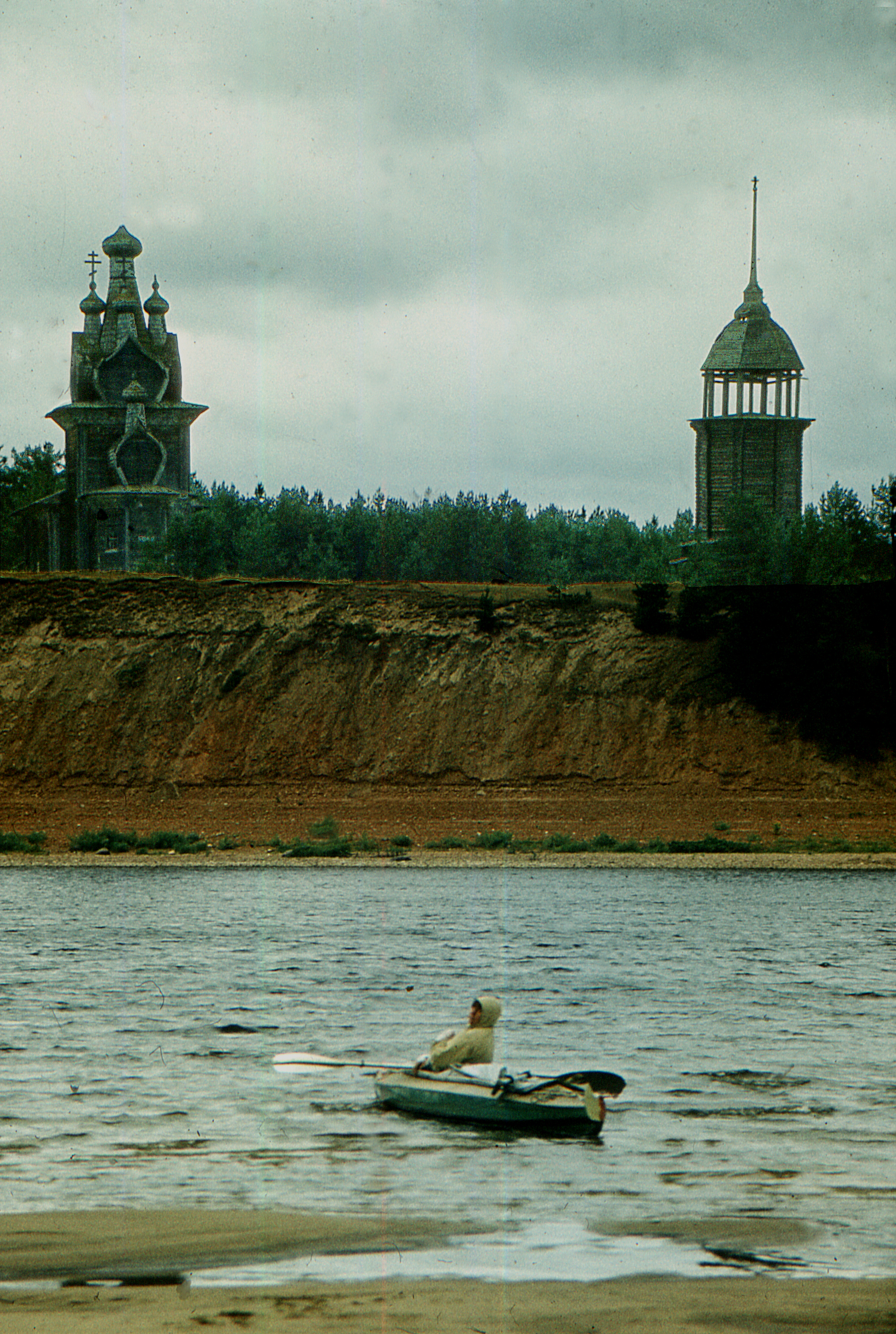
- The Pinega in the selo of Yedoma
- Native name: Пинега (Russian)

Location
- Country: Russia

Physical characteristics
- Mouth: Northern Dvina
  - coordinates: 64.1296°N 41.9012°E
- Length: 779 km (484 mi)
- Basin size: 42,600 km^{2} (16,400 sq mi)
- Discharge
  - average: 430 cubic metres per second (15,000 cu ft/s)

Basin features
- Progression: Northern Dvina→ White Sea

The Northern Dvina River basin. The map shows the Pinega

The Pinega (Пинега) is a river in Verkhnetoyemsky, Pinezhsky, and Kholmogorsky Districts of Arkhangelsk Oblast in Russia. It is a right tributary of the Northern Dvina. It is 779 kilometres (484 mi) long, and the area of its basin 42,600 square kilometres (16,400 sq mi). Its main tributaries are the Ilesha, the Vyya, the Yula, the Pokshenga, and the Yozhuga.

The Pinega is the main waterway of the Pinezhsky District, with many of the settlements in the district located on the river banks. The river basin includes the north-western part of the Krasnoborsky District, the eastern part of the Verkhnetoyemsky District, the eastern part of the Vinogradovsky District, the major part of the Pinezhsky District, the eastern part of the Kholmogorsky District, and minor areas in the Leshukonsky District and in the Udorsky District of the Komi Republic. The Pinega flows in the hilly landscape, on the western border of the Timan Ridge, in the coniferous forest (taiga). It freezes up in mid October or early November and stays under the ice until mid April or early May.

The etymology of the name Pinega is unclear.

The Pinega starts in Verkhnetoyemsky District, close to the border with Krasnoborsky District, at the confluence of the Belaya River and the Chyornaya River. There it flows to the north-west, then turns north. The first village on the Pinega is Belorechensky, still in Verkhnetoyemsky District. North of Belorechensky, the river meanders, and after accepting the Okhtoma River from the left, turns east. From this point downstream, the valley of the Pinega is populated, and the villages are grouped by several into mini-agglomerations. The Pinega accepts the Ilesha from the south and turns north again, emerging as a broad river with high banks. Further downstream it accepts the Vyya from the west, in the village of Ust-Vyyskaya, and after accepting the Nyukhcha from the right, in the village of Zanyukhcha, turns north-west. From this point on, the unpaved road appears from the Komi Republik, and follows the right bank of the river. Downstream from Zanyukhcha, the Pinega passes historical selos of Sura and Verkola, accepts the Yula from the west, and passes the selo of Kevrola, which was the historical center of the area before the 19th century, on the left bank, and the selo of Karpogory, which is the current administrative center of the Pinezhsky District, on the right bank. Several kilometers downstream from Karpogory, the Pinega accepts the Pokshenga and turns north. In the village of Shilega, there is a railway bridge on the railroad connecting Arkhangelsk and Karpogory.

Downstream from the mouth of the Yezhuga the Pinega suddenly turns west, and in the settlement of Pinega, which served as the administrative center of the area, turns south-west. On the right-hand bank Pinezhsky Nature Reserve has been established. Further downstream, the Pinega crosses into the Kholmogorsky District. Its mouth is in the historical settlement of Ust-Pinega.

The river is navigable upstream to 580 kilometres (360 mi) from its mouth; downstream from the village of Gorka, however, there is no passenger navigation. At one point, several kilometers upstream from the settlement of Pinega, the river comes within a distance of several kilometers to the course of the Kuloy. In this place, the Kuloy–Pinega Canal was constructed in 1926–28, however, currently the canal is pretty much neglected.

== History ==
The area was populated by Finnic peoples and then colonized by the Novgorod Republic. In the 13th century the Novgorod merchants already reached the White Sea. The Pinega was used by Novgorod merchants as the source of fur and also as the trading route to the basin of the Pechora River. From the Northern Dvina, there were a number of ways into the basin of the Mezen (from where the merchants could get to the basin of the Pechora and the Ob). Two options included going upstream the Pinega and taking the boats by land to the Kuloy and to the Mezen, or using the Pukshenga and the Pokshenga to get to the Pinega, and then from the Yozhuga taking boats by land to the Zyryanskaya Yezhuga and the Vashka.
