= Northern Dvina =

River in northern Russia flowing into the White Sea

Coordinates: 64°32′00″N 40°29′00″E

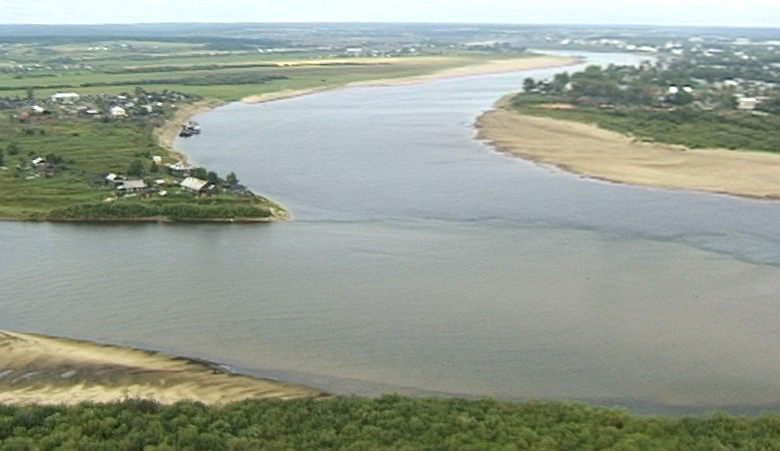
- Northern Dvina starts as the confluence of Yug River (on left) and Sukhona River (on top) near Veliky Ustyug (photo 2001)
- Native name: Северная Двина (Russian)

Location
- Country: Russia

Physical characteristics
- Source: Confluence of Yug and Sukhona
- Mouth
  - location: Dvina Bay
  - elevation: 0 m (0 ft)
- Length: 744 km (462 mi)
- Basin size: 357,052 km^{2} (137,859 sq mi)
- Discharge
  - location: White Sea (near mouth)
  - average: (Period: 1984–2018)106 km^{3}/a (3,400 m^{3}/s)
- Discharge
  - location: Ust-Pinega (169 km upstream of mouth; Basin size: 348,000 km^{2} (134,000 sq mi)
  - average: (Period: 1881–1993)3,332 m^{3}/s (117,700 cu ft/s)
  - minimum: 319 m^{3}/s (11,300 cu ft/s)
  - maximum: 20,800 m^{3}/s (730,000 cu ft/s)

Map of the Northern Dvina basin

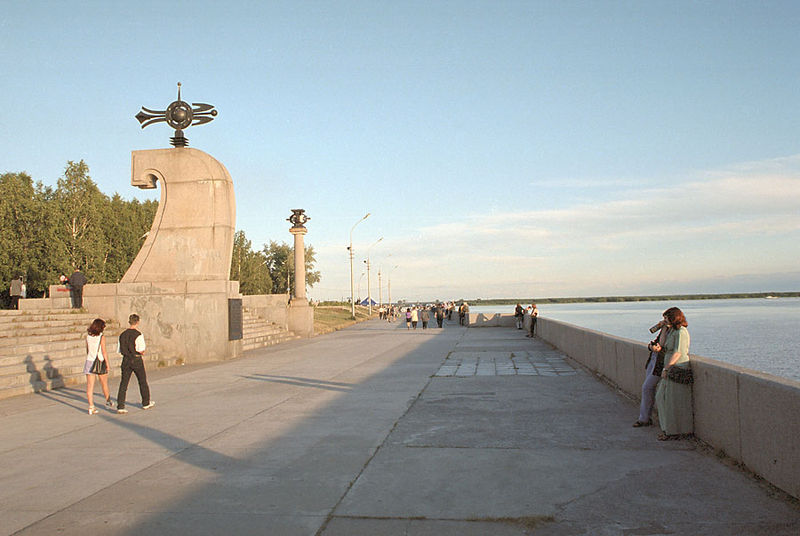
Northern Dvina Quay in Arkhangelsk

The Northern Dvina (Note: Russian: Северная Двина, romanized: Sévernaya Dviná, IPA: [ˈsʲevʲɪrnəjə dvʲɪˈna]; Komi: Вынва, romanized: Výnva, IPA: [ˈvɯ̈ɱvä]) is a river in northern Russia flowing through Vologda Oblast and Arkhangelsk Oblast into the Dvina Bay of the White Sea. Along with the Pechora River to the east, it drains most of Northwest Russia into the Arctic Ocean. It should not be confused with the Western Dvina (Daugava), to which it is not connected.

The principal tributaries of the Northern Dvina are the Vychegda (right), the Vaga (left), and the Pinega (right).

== Etymology ==
According to the Max Vasmer's Etymological Dictionary, the name of the river has been taken from the Western Dvina. The toponym Dvina does not stem from a Uralic language; however, its origin is unclear. Possibly it is an Indo-European word which used to mean river or stream.

In the Komi language, the river is called Вы́нва / Výnva from vyn "power" and va "water, river" hence "powerful river".

== Physical geography ==
=== River basin ===
The length of the Northern Dvina is 744 kilometres (462 mi). Together with its major tributary, the Sukhona, it is 1,302 kilometres (809 mi) long – about as long as the Rhine in central and western Europe. The area of its basin is 357,052 square kilometres (137,859 mi^{2}).

The river basin of the Northern Dvina includes the major parts of the Vologda and the Arkhangelsk Oblasts, as well as areas in the western part of the Komi Republic and in the northern part of the Kirov Oblast, and minor areas in the north of Yaroslavl and Kostroma Oblasts. The cities of Arkhangelsk and Vologda, as well as many smaller towns, many of those of significant historical importance such as Veliky Ustyug, Totma, Solvychegodsk, and Kholmogory, are located in the river basin of the Northern Dvina.

The Northern Dvina basin is roughly T-shaped. The 558 kilometres (347 mi)-long Sukhona River flows east and joins the basin of the west-flowing Vychegda (1,130 kilometres (700 mi) long). The combined river flows northwest into the White Sea, which it joins near the city of Arkhangelsk.

Looking more closely, the Sukhona flows east and meets the north-flowing Yug River at Veliky Ustyug. The combined stream, now called the Northern Dvina, flows north about 60 km and receives the west-flowing Vychegda at Kotlas and then turns northwest to flow into the White Sea. The Sukhona-Vychegda was an important east–west transportation route while the Northern Dvina-Yug was a north–south route. The upper Sukhona is now connected by the Northern Dvina Canal to the Volga–Baltic Waterway, which links Petersburg to Moscow.

=== River course ===
The Sukhona flows east, eventually north-east, joins the north-flowing Yug at Veliky Ustyug and acquires the name 'Northern Dvina'. The P157 highway connects Kostroma with Kotlas via Nikolsk and Veliky Ustyug. North of Veliky Ustyg, the highway runs on the left bank of the Northern Dvina. The river flows about 60 kilometres (37 mi) north crossing from the Vologda Oblast into the Arkhangelsk Oblast, where in the city of Kotlas it receives the west-flowing Vychegda River which rises in the northern Ural Mountains.

Since, at the confluence, the length of the Vychegda is greater than that of the Northern Dvina, the river between the source and the confluence with the Vychegda is sometimes known as the Lesser Northern Dvina (Малая Северная Двина). Shortly downstream from the confluence, the Northern Dvina is crossed by the railway connecting Konosha with Kotlas and Vorkuta.

The Northern Dvina turns northwest and receives a number of smaller rivers such as the Uftyuga and the Nizhnyaya Toyma, both from the northeast. Near the urban settlement of Bereznik, the Vaga comes in from the south. At this point, the M8 highway which runs from Moscow through Vologda to Arkhangelsk, also enters the region. The Yomtsa or Yemtsa joins from the southeast, with the P1 highway (from Kargopol) running parallel.

The Pinega, formerly an important river route, joins from the east. Near the mouth of the Pinega, the river splits into several channels, among which is the ancient selo of Kholmogory 75 kilometres (47 mi) southeast of Arkhangelsk. The branches rejoin and pass the modern logging town of Novodvinsk.

Downstream from Novodvinsk, the 900 square kilometres (350 mi^{2}) delta begins. In the upstream part of the delta, the great port of Arkhangelsk is located. It gradually replaced Kholmogory as the chief city of the region. On the southwest side of the delta is the naval base of Severodvinsk, the second-largest city in the region. The delta ends in the Dvina Bay of the White Sea.

The river flows through Velikoustyugsky District of the Vologda Oblast and through Kotlassky, Krasnsoborky, Verkhnetoyemsky, Vinogradovsky, Kholmogorsky, and Primorsky districts of the Arkhangelsk Oblast. All administrative centers of these districts are located at the banks of the Northern Dvina, as they developed when the river was the major transportation route of the region.

== Navigation and canals ==
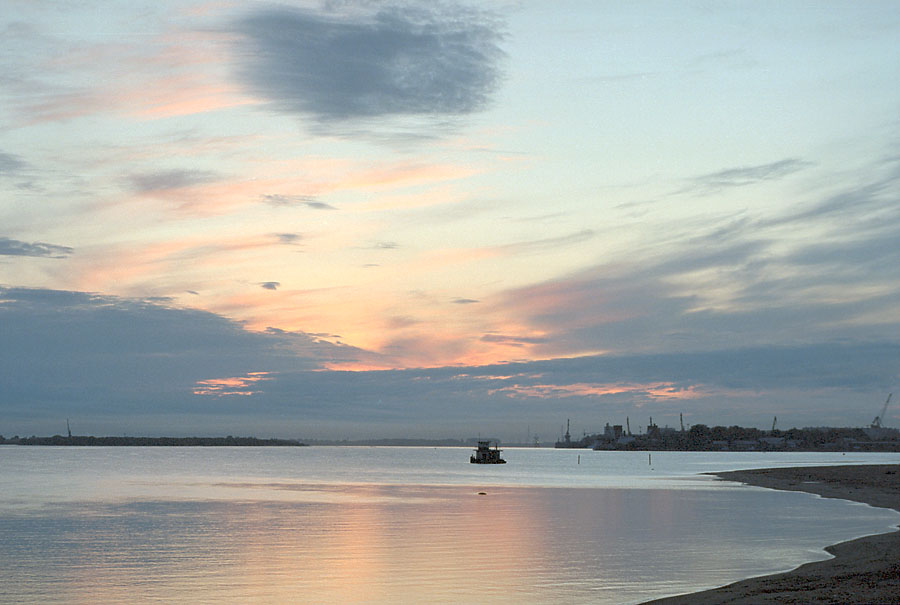
View from Arkhangelsk, Russia

In summer, the entire length of the river is navigable and is heavily used for timber rafting. The Northern Dvina Canal connects it with the Volga–Baltic Waterway. In the 19th century, a short-lived Northern Ekaterininsky Canal, now abandoned, connected the Northern Dvina basin with the Kama basin as well. In 1926–28 a canal connecting the Pinega, one of the major tributaries of the Northern Dvina, with the Kuloy, was constructed, however, currently the canal is pretty much neglected.

Heavy commercial passenger navigation has largely disappeared and only local passenger lines remain. The passenger line connecting Kotlas and Arkhangelsk has been out of operation since 2005.

== History ==
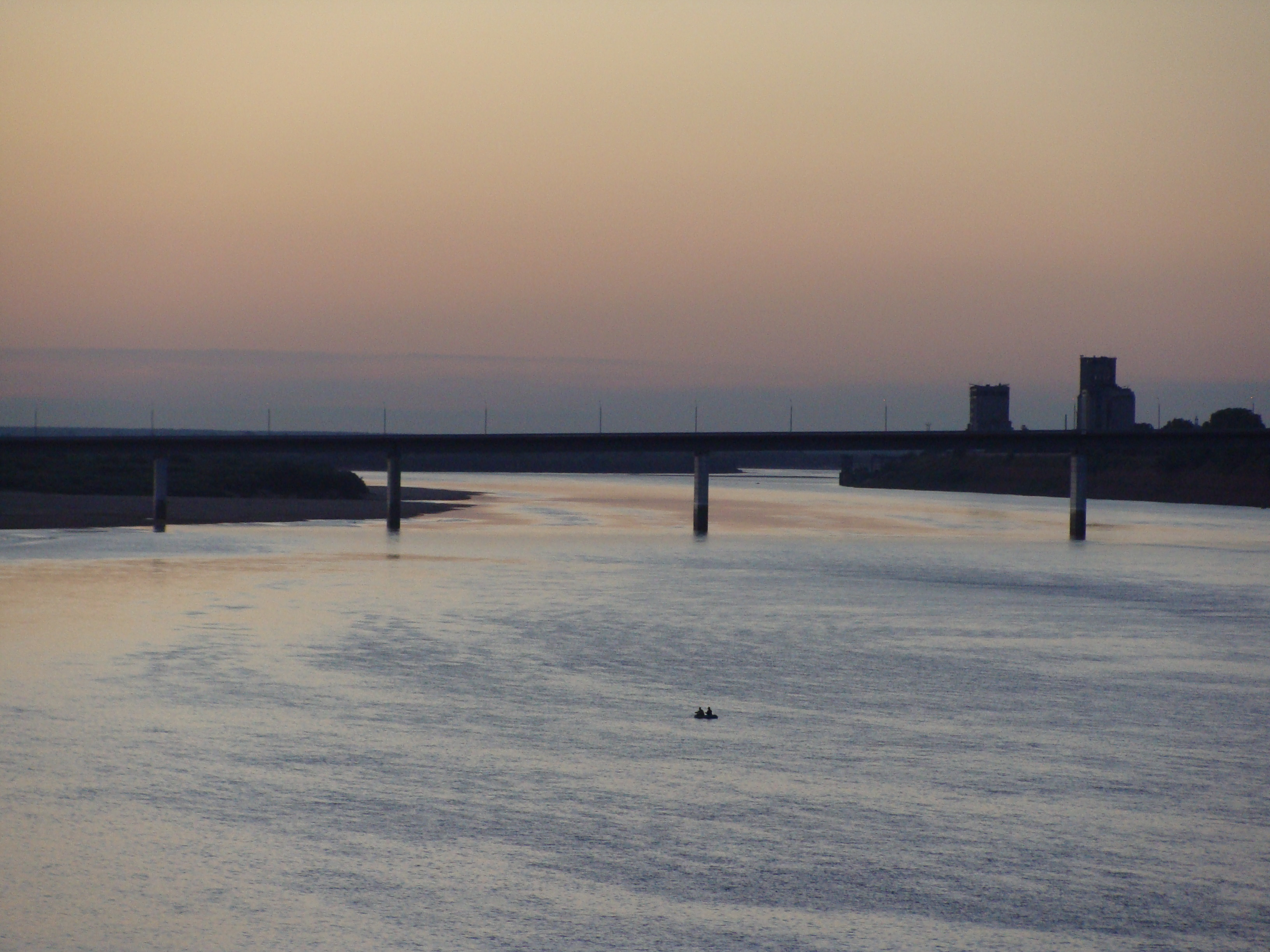
The Northern Dvina at the city of Kotlas. The picture is taken from the railway bridge; in front, there is the highway bridge

The area was populated by Finnic peoples and then colonized by the Novgorod Republic. The only exception was Veliky Ustyug, which was part of Vladimir-Suzdal Principality. The rest of the Northern Dvina basin was controlled by Novgorod. Veliky Ustyug has been first mentioned in the chronicles in 1207, Shenkursk — in 1229, Solvychegodsk was founded in the 14th century. In the 13th century the Novgorod merchants already reached the White Sea. The area was initially attractive because of fur trading. The main waterway from Novgorod into the Northern Dvina was along the Volga and its tributary, the Sheksna, along the Slavyanka River into Lake Nikolskoye, then the boats were taken by land to Lake Blagoveshchenskoye, from there downstream along the Porozovitsa River into Lake Kubenskoye and further to the Sukhona and the Northern Dvina.

From the Northern Dvina, there were a number of ways into the basin of the Mezen (from where the merchants could get to the basin of the Pechora and the Ob). One was upstream the Vychegda and the Yarenga, and by land into the Vashka. Another one was upstream the Vychegda, the Vym, the Yelva, then by land to the Irva and to the Mezen. Two further options included going upstream the Pinega and then by land to the Kuloy and to the Mezen, or using the Pukshenga and the Pokshenga to get to the Pinega, and then from the Yozhuga taking boats by land to the Zyryanskaya Yezhuga and the Vashka. From the Vychegda, the merchants also could get directly to the river basin of the Pechora via either the Cherya and the Izhma, or the Mylva.

From the 14th century, Kholmogory was the main trading harbor on the Northern Dvina, but in the 17th century it lost this distinction to Arkhangelsk even though the seat of the Kholmogory and Vaga Eparchy, from 1732 known as Kholmogory and Archangelogorod Eparchy, which had jurisdiction over all Northern Russia including the Solovetsky Monastery, was located in Kholmogory until 1762. Until the 1700s, Arkhangelsk was the main trading harbour for the sea trade of Russia and western Europe, and the Northern Dvina was the main trading route connecting the central Russia with Arkhangelsk. Peter the Great drastically changed the situation, by founding Saint Petersburg in 1703, thus opening the way for the Baltic Sea trade, and by constructing the highway between Saint Petersburg and Arkhangelsk via Kargopol. The river quickly lost its role as the leading trading route, which was accelerated by the construction of the railway between Vologda and Arkhangelsk between 1894 and 1897.

The Northern Dvina was scene of several battles during the Russian Civil War, many involving the Entente interventionist army as part of their North Russia Campaign. A special Northern Dvina Flotilla existed during the Civil War.
