= Verkhnyaya Toyma, Arkhangelsk Oblast =

Rural locality in Arkhangelsk Oblast, Russia

Verkhnyaya Toyma Верхняя Тойма
- Selo
- Interactive map of Verkhnyaya Toyma
- Location of Verkhnyaya Toyma Verkhnyaya Toyma (Arkhangelsk Oblast)
- Coordinates: 62°15′N 45°01′E
- Country: Russia
- Federal subject: Arkhangelsk Oblast
- Administrative district: Verkhnetoyemsky District
- Selsoviet: Verkhnetoyemsky Selsoviet

Population
  - Estimate (3462): 2,002 )

Administrative status
  - Capital of: Verkhnetoyemsky District, Verkhnetoyemsky Selsoviet

Municipal status
  - Municipal district: Verkhnetoyemsky Municipal District
  - Rural settlement: Verkhnetoyemskoye Rural Settlement
  - Capital of: Verkhnetoyemsky Municipal District, Verkhnetoyemskoye Rural Settlement
- Time zone: UTC+3 (MSK)
- Postal code: 165500
- OKTMO ID: 11608408101

Verkhnyaya Toyma (Russian: Ве́рхняя То́йма) is a rural locality (a selo) and the administrative center of Verkhnetoyemsky District, Arkhangelsk Oblast, Russia, located on the right bank of the Northern Dvina River. It also serves as the administrative center of Verkhnetoyemsky Selsoviet, one of the fourteen selsoviets into which the district is administratively divided. Municipally, it is the administrative center of Verkhnetoyemskoye Rural Settlement. Population: 3,462 (2010 census); 3,940 (2002 census); 4,430 (1989 Soviet census). It is served by Verkhnyaya Toyma Airport.

== History ==
=== Etymology ===
The name of Verkhnyaya Toyma stems from the name of the Verkhnyaya Toyma River, which, in turn, means The Upper Toyma, as compared with The Lower Toyma, the Nizhnyaya Toyma River, also a right tributary of the Northern Dvina.

The toponym Toyma is common to all northern Russian territories, from Toyma in Karelia to Toyma River in the Republic of Tatarstan. It relates to an extinct Uralic ethnonym of the same name known to the Novgorodians since (at least) the beginning of the 12th century. Janet Martin considered Toima (sic) the southern extreme of Novgorodian control over the Dvina basin in this period. The first mention of Toyma, paying tribute to Novgorodians, is dated 1137 but there is no evidence that the word Toyma relates to the present-day area or its neighbor, Verkhnetoyemsky Selsoviet. The 1219 chronicle mentions ethnonym toymokary (Russian: ... И поиде тои зимö Семьюнъ Öминъ въ 4 стöх на Тоимокары ...). The 1237 Tale of the Death of the Russian Land mentions "Toymichs pagans" living between "the Karelians" and Veliky Ustyug (Russian: ...от корöлы до Оустьюга, гдö тамо бяхоу тоимици погании...), a location roughly aligned with the Northern Dvina basin.

Russian linguists argue whether the ethnonym Toyma relates to a specific tribe, a tribal group, a language or a whole continuum of Uralic languages. Evgeny Chelimsky applied ethnonym Toyma to the wide area in the southern part of Northern Dvina basin and wrote that it is equivalent to the Northern Finns in Aleksandr Matveyev's classification. Matveyev objected, writing that the Northern Finnish continuum was considerably wider than Toyma's, and that the hypothetical Toyma people occupied only a minor portion of it. He preferred to equate the Toyma with a particular tribe that lived in Nizhnaya Toyma area, and noted that it also could belong to Permic languages. At any rate, the Toymas disappeared before the 17th century, when their existence could be recorded in Muscovite sources, either through russification or through earlier assimilation by other Uralic peoples.

=== Timeline ===
From 1552, Verkhnyaya Toyma was a local administration center. In the 17th century, there were two annual trade fairs in Toyma: The Annunciation Day Fair (April, 7) and the Saint Peter's Day Fair (July 5).

Until 1924, the area was a part of Solvychegodsky Uyezd, which belonged to a variety of Governorates, and in 1918 moved to the newly established Northern Dvina Governorate. In 1924, the uyezds were abolished in favor of the new divisions, the districts (raions). Verkhnetoyemsky District was formed on April 10, 1924.

== Geography and location ==
Verkhnyaya Toyma is located on the right bank of the Northern Dvina River, at the confluence of the Verkhnyaya Toyma River. It is located northwest of Kotlas.

== Economy ==
Prior to 1917, the main occupations of the population were hunting, wood distillation, and livestock production. Crop production was basically unknown, and regular shortages of bread have been recorded due to the seasonal inaccessibility of the area. Verkhnyaya Toyma was a major trade center due to the location on the Northern Dvina. The large-scale timber industry only took a start in 1929, when Nizhnyaya Toyma Forest Production Company (Russian: Верхнетоемский леспромхоз) was established. The agriculture is currently bankrupt and does not deliver any products.

=== Transportation ===
Northern Dvina is navigable, although there is only local passenger navigation.

The right bank of the Northern Dvina River (including Verkhnyaya Toyma) is not connected by the all-season roads to the main road network. There are local roads, mostly unpaved. There is a ferry crossing over the Northern Dvina.

There is an airport, which used to generate considerable passenger traffic in the 1980s, but it is now defunct.

== Culture and recreation ==
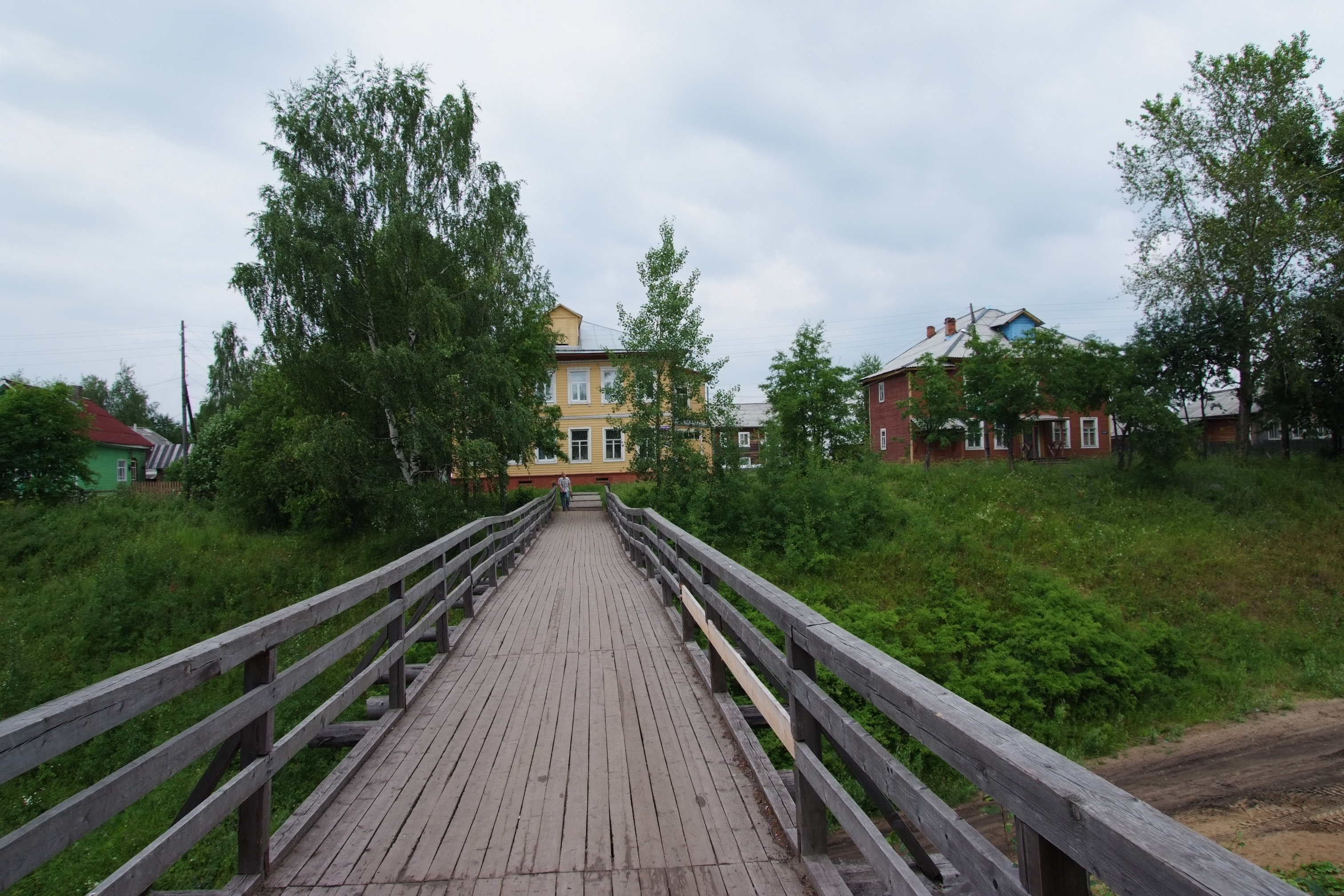
A wooden bridge in the selo of Verkhnyaya Toyma

The district contains 3 objects classified as cultural and historical heritage (all of local importance). These include

- The bridge over Verkhnyaya Toyma River (1930s);
- The Kuznetsov House (1858);
- The bridge over a ravine (1960s).

The only museum in Verkhnyaya Toyma is the District is Verkhnyaya Toyma District Museum
