= Verkhnetoyemsky District =

Verkhnetoyemsky District Верхнетоемский район (Russian)
- District
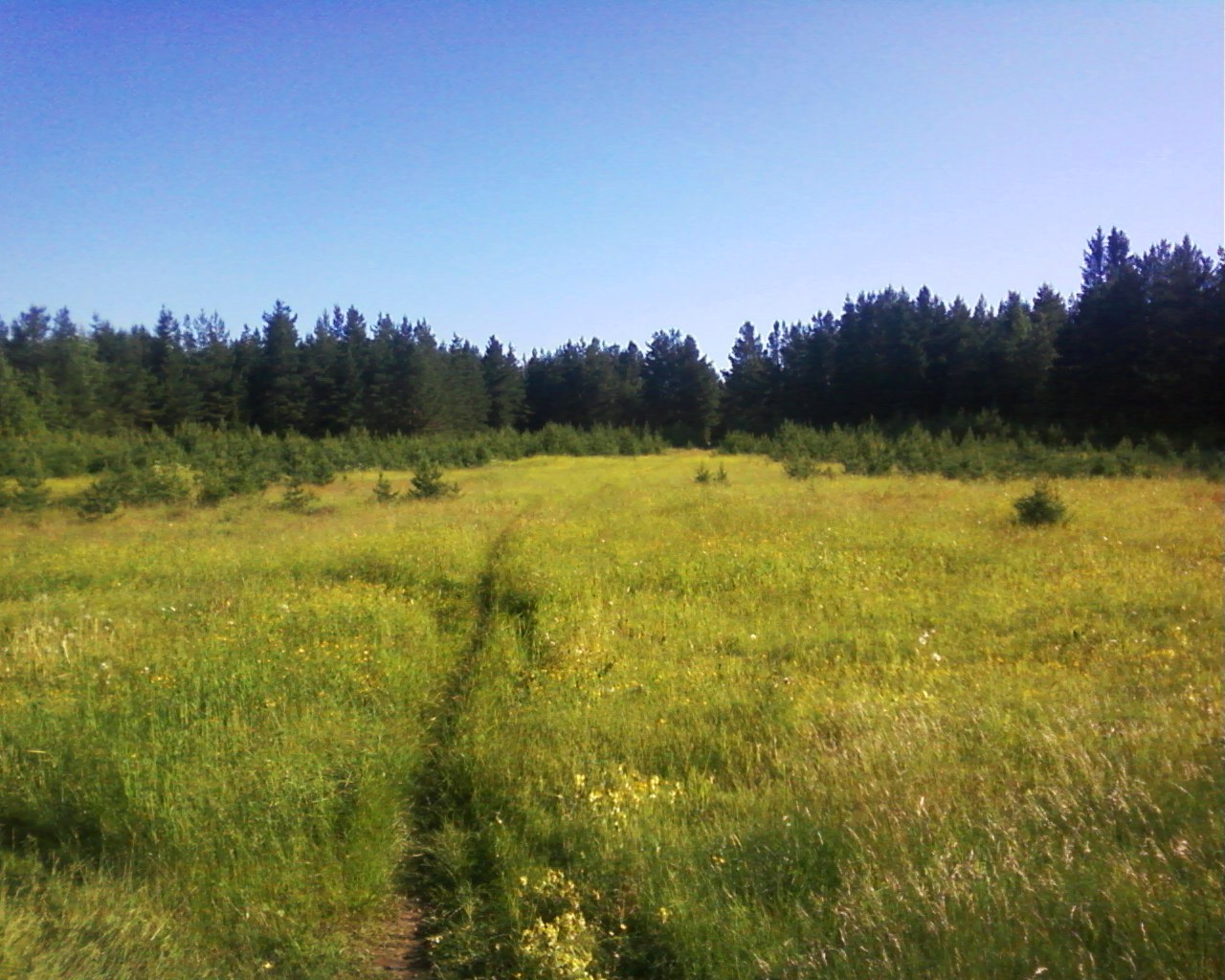
- Landscape in Verhnetoymesky District

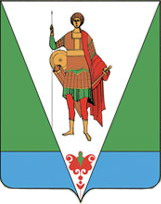
- Flag Coat of arms
- Location of Verkhnetoyemsky District in Arkhangelsk Oblast
- Coordinates: 61°15′N 46°39′E
- Country: Russia
- Federal subject: Arkhangelsk Oblast
- Established: April 10, 1924
- Administrative center: Verkhnyaya Toyma

Area
  - Total: 20,400 km^{2} (7,900 sq mi)

Population (2010 Census)
  - Total: 17,060
  - Density: 0.836/km^{2} (2.17/sq mi)
  - Urban: 0%
  - Rural: 100%

Administrative structure
  - Administrative divisions: 14 Selsoviets
  - Inhabited localities: 287 rural localities

Municipal structure
  - Municipally incorporated as: Verkhnetoyemsky Municipal District
  - Municipal divisions: 0 urban settlements, 8 rural settlements
- Time zone: UTC+3 (MSK)
- OKTMO ID: 11508000
- Website: http://www.vtojma.ru

Verkhnetoyemsky District (Russian: Верхнето́емский райо́н) is an administrative district (raion), one of the twenty-one in Arkhangelsk Oblast, Russia. Municipally, it is incorporated as Verkhnetoyemsky Municipal District. It is located in the southeast of the oblast and borders with Pinezhsky District in the north, Udorsky District of the Komi Republic in the east, Krasnoborsky and Ustyansky Districts in the south, Shenkursky District in the west, and with Vinogradovsky District in the northwest. Its administrative center is the rural locality (a selo) of Verkhnyaya Toyma. District's population: 17,060 (2010 census); 22,630 (2002 census); 27,989 (1989 Soviet census). The population of Verkhnyaya Toyma accounts for 20.3% of the district's total population.

== History ==
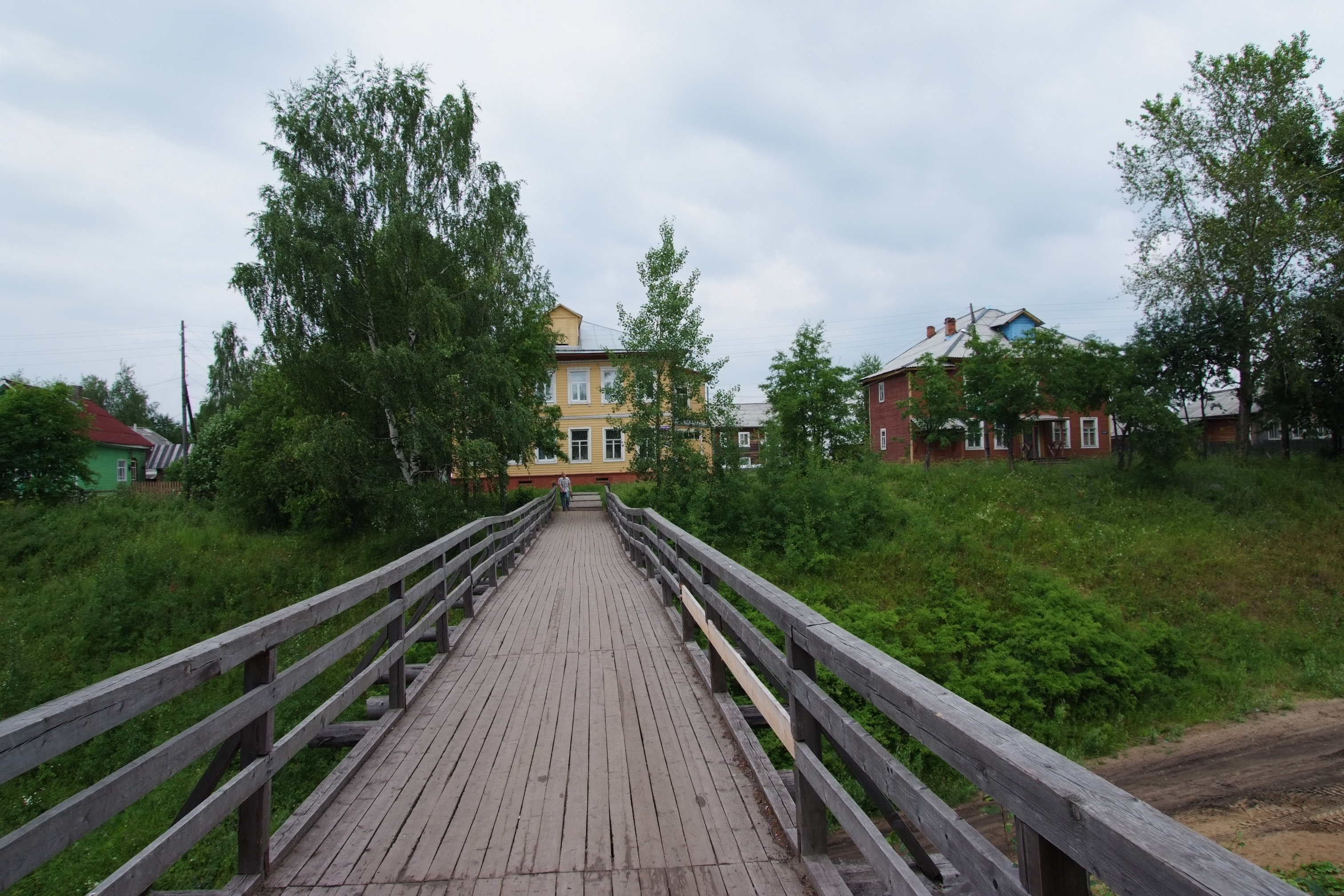
A wooden bridge in the selo of Verkhnyaya Toyma

The area was populated by speakers of Uralic languages and then colonized by the Novgorod Republic. After the fall of Novgorod, the area became a part of the Grand Duchy of Moscow. Toyma was first mentioned in the chronicles in 1137 as a point where the indigenous population had to bring tribute (fur), although it is not clear whether this Toyma refers to the present-day Verkhnyaya Toyma. From 1552, Verkhnyaya Toyma has been a local administration center.

In the course of the administrative reform carried out in 1708 by Peter the Great, the area was included into Archangelgorod Governorate, In 1780, the governorate was abolished and transformed into Vologda Viceroyalty. In 1918, the area was transferred to the newly formed Northern Dvina Governorate, and in 1924 the uyezds were abolished in favor of the new divisions, the districts (raions). Verkhnetoyemsky District was created on April 10, 1924 and included a part of the former Solvychegodsky Uyezd. Verkhnetoyemsky District had the largest area and was the least populous among the districts of Northern Dvina Governorate.

In the following years, the district remained in the same borders, but the first-level administrative division of Russia kept changing. In 1929, Northern Dvina Governorate was merged into Northern Krai, which in 1936 was transformed into Northern Oblast. In 1937, Northern Oblast was split into Arkhangelsk Oblast and Vologda Oblast. Verkhnetoyemsky District remained in Arkhangelsk Oblast ever since.

From 1924 to 1959, Cherevkovsky District existed, with the administrative center in Cherevkovo, initially in Northern Dvina Governorate. On September 11, 1959, the district was abolished and split between Krasnoborsky, Verkhnetoyemsky, and Ustyansky Districts; the administrative center of Cherevkovo became a part of Krasnoborsky District.

== Geography ==
The district is located on both banks of the Northern Dvina River; the left-bank-part of the district is considerably smaller than the right-hand-one. A major part of the district belongs to the drainage basin of the Northern Dvina and its major tributaries. The main (right-hand) Northern Dvina tributaries within the district are the Verkhnyaya Toyma and the Nizhnyaya Toyma Rivers. The central and eastern parts of the district belongs to the basin of the Pinega River with its main tributaries the Vyya (left) and the Ilesha (right). The Pinega flows through Verkhnetoyemsky District from south to north and joins the Northern Dvina outside the boundaries of the district. A minor area in the northeast of the district belongs to the basin of the Mezen River (not of the Northern Dvina basin). The whole area of the district drains into the White Sea.

Almost the whole of the district is covered by coniferous forests (taiga). The exception are the meadows in the floodplains.

== Divisions ==
=== Administrative divisions ===
Administratively, the district is divided into fourteen selsoviets. The only locality which previously had urban-type settlement status, Dvinskoy, was in 2004 downgraded in status to that of a rural locality. The following selsoviets have been established (the administrative centers are given in parentheses):

- Afanasyevsky (Voznesenskoye)
- Dvinskoy (Dvinskoy)
- Fedkovsky (Avnyugsky)
- Gorkovsky (Sogra)
- Kornilovsky (Isakovskaya)
- Nizhnetoyemsky (Burtsevskaya)
- Novovershinsky (Lakhoma)
- Puchuzhsky (Kondratovskaya)
- Seftrensky (Zelennik)
- Soyginsky (Igumnovskaya)
- Timoshinsky (Semyonovskaya 1-ya)
- Verkhnetoyemsky (Verkhnyaya Toyma)
- Vershinsky (Chyorny Ruchey)
- Vyysky (Okulovskaya)

=== Municipal divisions ===
Municipally, the district is divided into eight rural settlements (the administrative centers are given in parentheses):

- Afanasyevskoye Rural Settlement (Voznesenskoye)
- Dvinskoye Rural Settlement (Dvinskoy)
- Fedkovskoye Rural Settlement (Avnyugsky)
- Gorkovskoye Rural Settlement (Sogra)
- Puchuzhskoye Rural Settlement (Kondratovskaya)
- Seftrenskoye Rural Settlement (Zelennik)
- Verkhnetoyemskoye Rural Settlement (Verkhnyaya Toyma)
- Vyyskoye Rural Settlement (Okulovskaya)

== Economy ==
Before 1917, the main occupations of the population were hunting, wood distillation, and livestock production. Crop production was basically unknown, and regular shortages of bread had been recorded due to the seasonal inaccessibility of the area. Verkhnyaya Toyma was a major trade center due to the location on the Northern Dvina. The large-scale timber industry only took off in 1929, when Nizhnyaya Toyma Forest Production Company (Верхнетоемский леспромхоз) was established. The agriculture is currently bankrupt and does not deliver any products.

=== Industry ===
The basis of the economy of the district is timber industry.

=== Transportation ===
The Northern Dvina is navigable, although there is only local passenger navigation.

There is a road connecting Kotlas and Arkhangelsk on the left bank of the Northern Dvina River. There are also local roads. There is regular passenger bus traffic over the district, and also from Krasnoborsk to Arkhangelsk. The right bank of the Northern Dvina River (including Verkhnyaya Toyma) is not connected by the all-season roads to the main road network.

There is an airport in Verkhnyaya Toyma, which used to generate considerable passenger traffic in the 1980s, but is now defunct.

== Culture and recreation ==
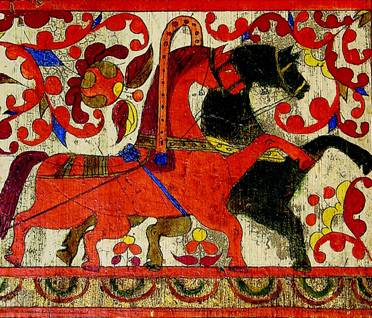
Red (day) and black (night) horses. Fragment of a spinning distaff board from the Nizhnyaya Toyma area

The district contains four objects classified as cultural and historical heritage by the Russian Federal law, and additionally seventy-five objects classified as cultural and historical heritage of local importance. Most of these are wooden churches and wooden rural houses built before 1917.

The four objects protected at the federal level are:

- St. George Church (1672) in the village of Vershina, which was moved to the museum of Malye Korely in Arkhangelsk
- The ensemble of Soyezerskaya Pustyn including the Trinity Church (1748) and the bell-tower (18th century)

The only state museum in the district is Verkhnyaya Toyma District Museum in Verkhnyaya Toyma

=== Nizhnyaya Toyma painting school ===
Nizhnetoyemskaya Volost (now Nizhnetoyemsky Selsoviet) was a center of traditional wood painting crafts in the 19th and 20th centuries. The paintings are typically in black and red colors over a yellow background. Their favorite motifs were the Sirin Bird and the black horses, symbols of a wealthy household. By the 1970s, the craft went into decline.
