= Administrative divisions of the Komi Republic =

Administrative districts of Russian federal subject

Komi Republic Russia
- Capital: Syktyvkar

Administrative structure (as of 2014)
- Districts: 12
- Cities/towns: 10
- Urban-type settlements: 29
- Selsovets: 173

Municipal structure (as of 2002)
- Rural settlements: 729 (inhabited); 17 (uninhabited)

Map of the Komi Republic (with numbered)

Komi Republic is divided into 12 raions or districts.

== Administrative and municipal divisions ==
Map

Division		Structure		OKATO	OKTMO	Urban-type settlement/ district-level town*	Rural (administrative territory)
Division		Administrative	Municipal	OKATO	OKTMO	Urban-type settlement/ district-level town*	Rural (administrative territory)
Syktyvkar (Сыктывкар)		city	urban okrug	87 401	87 701	Krasnozatonsky (Краснозатонский); Sedkyrkeshch (Седкыркещ); Verkhnyaya Maksakovka (Верхняя Максаковка)	
↳	Ezhvinsky (Эжвинский)	(under Syktyvkar)	—N/a	87 401	—N/a		
Vorkuta (Воркута)		city	urban okrug	87 410	87 710	Komsomolsky (Комсомольский); Mulda (Мульда); Oktyabrsky (Октябрьский); Promyshlenny (Промышленный); Severny (Северный); Vorgashor (Воргашор); Yeletsky (Елецкий); Zapolyarny (Заполярный)	1
Vuktyl (Вуктыл)		city	district	87 412	87 602		4
Inta (Инта)		city	urban okrug	87 415	87 715	Kozhym (Кожым); Verkhnyaya Inta (Верхняя Инта)	4
Pechora (Печора)		city	district	87 420	87 620	Izyayu (Изъяю); Kozhva (Кожва); Puteyets (Путеец)	4
Sosnogorsk (Сосногорск)		city	district	87 422	87 626	Nizhny Odes (Нижний Одес); Voyvozh (Войвож)	
Usinsk (Усинск)		city	urban okrug	87 423	87 723	Parma (Парма)	6
Ukhta (Ухта)		city	urban okrug	87 425	87 725	Borovoy (Боровой); Shudayag (Шудаяг); Vodny (Водный); Yarega (Ярега)	3
Izhemsky (Ижемский)		district		87 204	87 604		10
Knyazhpogostsky (Княжпогостский)		district		87 208	87 608	Yemva (Емва) town*; Sindor (Синдор)	8
Koygorodsky (Койгородский)		district		87 212	87 612		10
Kortkerossky (Корткеросский)		district		87 216	87 616		18
Priluzsky (Прилузский)		district		87 224	87 624		16
Syktyvdinsky (Сыктывдинский)		district		87 228	87 628		13
Sysolsky (Сысольский)		district		87 232	87 632		11
Troitsko-Pechorsky (Троицко-Печорский)		district		87 236	87 636	Troitsko-Pechorsk (Троицко-Печорск)	10
Udorsky (Удорский)		district		87 240	87 640	Blagoyevo (Благоево); Mezhdurechensk (Междуреченск); Usogorsk (Усогорск)	12
Ust-Kulomsky (Усть-Куломский)		district		87 248	87 648		22
Ust-Tsilemsky (Усть-Цилемский)		district		87 252	87 652		11
Ust-Vymsky (Усть-Вымский)		district		87 244	87 644	Mikun (Микунь) town*; Zheshart (Жешарт)	10
