= Izhma =

Izhma may refer to:

- Izhma, Komi Republic, a rural locality (a selo) in the Komi Republic, Russia
- Izhma, Nizhny Novgorod Oblast, a rural locality (a settlement) in Nizhny Novgorod Oblast, Russia
- Izhma Airport, an airport in the Komi Republic, Russia
- Izhma, name of the town of Sosnogorsk in the Komi Republic, Russia, until 1957
- Izhma River, a tributary of the Pechora River

== See also ==
- Izhma Komi, an ethnic group of the Komi people
