= Ukhta (disambiguation) =

Ukhta is a town in the Komi Republic, Russia.

Ukhta may also refer to:

- Ukhta Urban Okrug, a municipal formation which the town of republic significance of Ukhta in the Komi Republic, Russia is incorporated as
- Ukhta (inhabited locality), several inhabited localities in Russia
- Ukhta Airport, a civilian airport in the Komi Republic, Russia
- Ukhta (river), a river in the Komi Republic, Russia
- Kalevala, a settlement in Karelia called Ukhta until 1963
