= Izhma Komi =

Sub-group of the Komi people

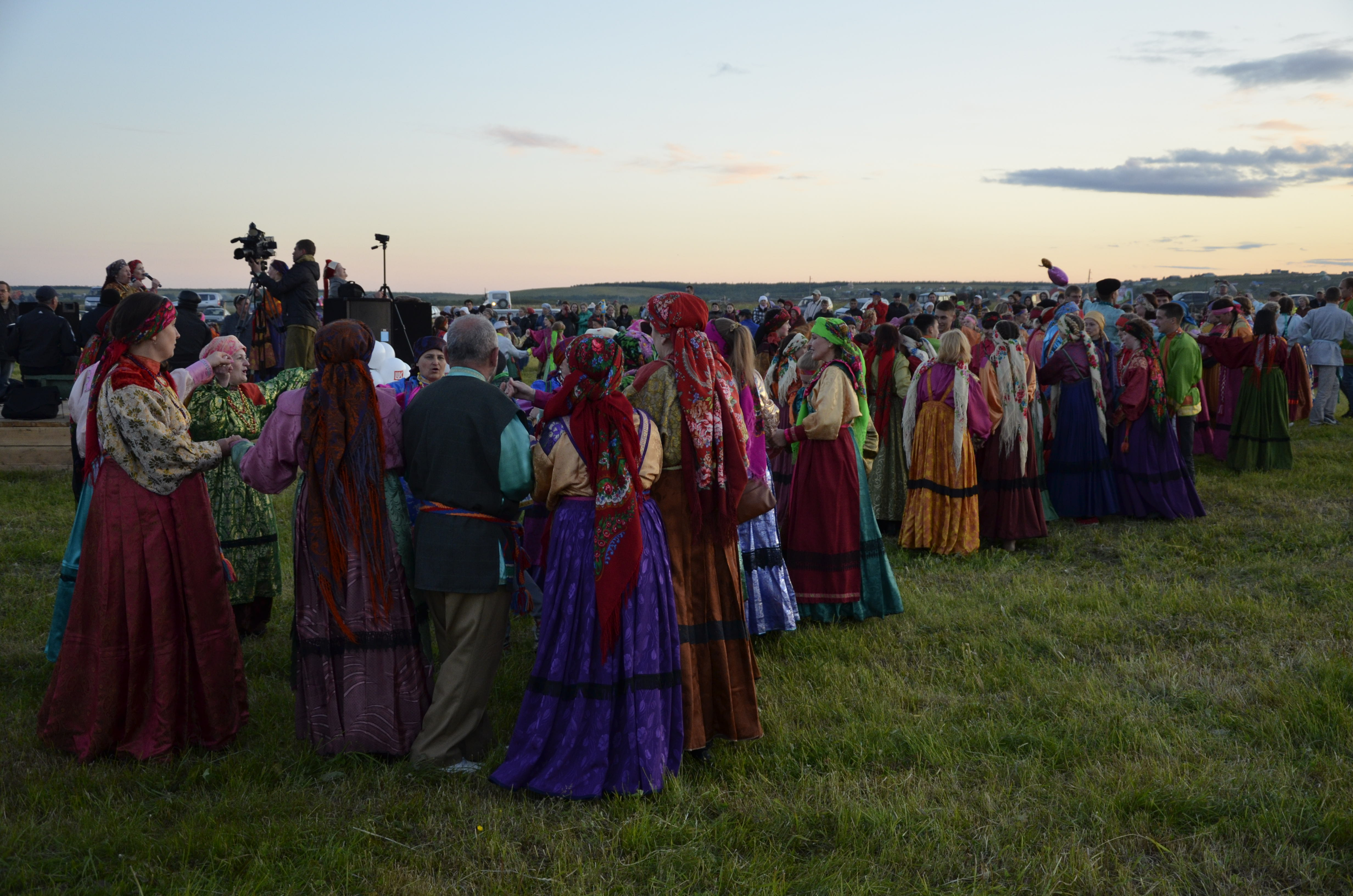
Izhma Komi during Lud celebrations, 2015.

The Izhma Komi (Russian: коми-ижемцы, komi-izhemtsy; endonym: изьватаc, iźvatas; Nenets: нысма, nysma) is a sub-group of the much larger Komi people, who traditionally reside in the north of the Komi Republic, primarily in the Izhemsky District, but also in the Nenets Autonomous Okrug and the Yamalo-Nenets Autonomous Okrug around the borders with the Komi Republic.

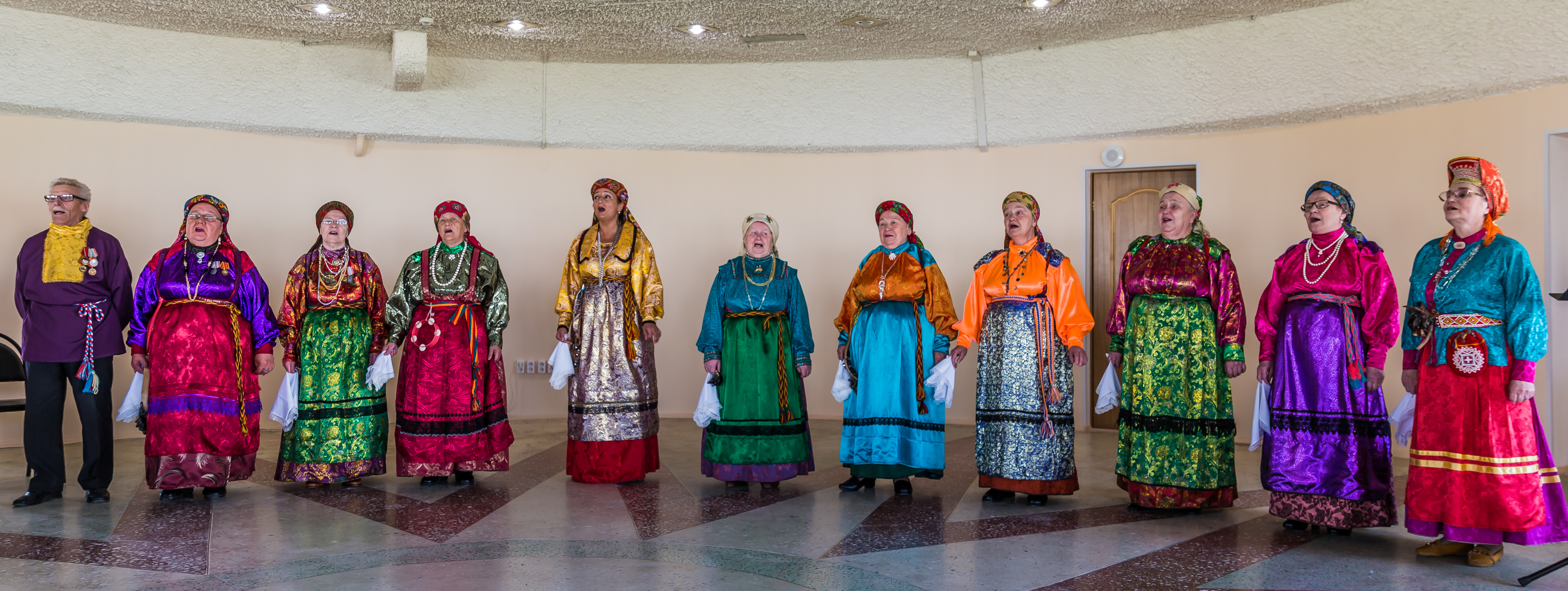
Izhma Komi and Kildin Sámi singers in Lovozero, Murmansk Oblast.

The beginning of the formation of the Izhma Komi ethnic group is traced to the second half of the 16th century when a group of Komi founded the Izhma sloboda by the Izhma River. The formation of the separate ethnicity finalized during the 17th and 18th centuries. During the 19th century they expanded their area of settlement by settling along the middle Pechora River, by the Usa River, in Bolshezemelskaya and Kanin Peninsula tundras. They also crossed the Ural Mountains and settled by the Ob River. A group of Izhma Komi settled as far as at the Kola Peninsula, where 1,128 were recorded to live in the 2002 census.

Their primary subsistence was based on reindeer herding, showing similarities between the lifestyles of the Nenets and the Izhma Komi. More cultural interactions and adaptations can be seen in the traditional residences of the Izhma Komi, the chum, which the Nenets and other Samoyedic ethnic groups traditionally reside in.
