= Mikun (disambiguation) =

Mikun is a town in the Komi Republic, Russia, or the urban settlement containing it.

Mikun may also refer to:

- Mikun (inhabited locality), several inhabited localities in Russia
- Mikŭn dong, McCune–Reischauer romanization of Migeun-dong, a neighborhood of Seul, South Korea
- Mī-kun, a cyborg cat from the Cyborg Kuro-chan manga series
- Mi-kun, a toy-like support mecha from Ground Defense Force! Mao-chan comedy anime
- Mi-kun, Doctor Zero's pet cat from the Space Pirate Captain Harlock manga series
- Mi-kun, Dr. Sado's pet cat from Space Battleship Yamato anime series
