= Andrei Golovachyov =

Russian serial killer (born 1967)

- Born: Andrei Grigoryevich Golovachyov; 22 June 1967 (age 59); Yarega, Komi ASSR, RSFSR
- Other names: "The Apartment Maniac" "The Tenant Maniac" "Schwartz"
- Conviction: Murder
- Penalty: Life imprisonment

Details
- Victims: 14+
- Span of crimes: 1996–2000
- Country: Russia
- States: Komi, Vladimir, Krasnodar, Rostov, Voronezh, Moscow
- Date apprehended: For the final time in 2000
- Imprisoned at: Vologodskiy Pyatak, Ognenny Ostrov

Andrei Grigoryevich Golovachyov (Russian: Андрей Григорьевич Головачёв; born 22 June 1967), known as The Apartment Maniac (Russian: Квартирный маньяк), is a Russian serial killer who committed at least 14 murders in six regions of Russia from 1996 to 2000. Arrested and sentenced to life imprisonment for five of the murders in 2002, he has since confessed to nine additional killings.

== Early life ==
Little is known of Golovachyov's background. Born in 1967 in Yarega, Komi ASSR, he is known to have engaged in sporting activities during his school years. In the mid-1980s, following the enactment of the "Cooperative Law" and the blossoming of the cooperative movement which brought large profits from protection and racketeering, Golovachyov began a criminal lifestyle in the city of Ukhta. By the end of the decade, he was imprisoned for robbery and released in the early 1990s, whereupon he joined a local gang. While with this gang, he was known by the nickname "Schwartz".

== Murders ==
In September 1996, Golovachyov committed his first murder - while visiting a café with a friend of his, he started making romantic advances towards one of the waitresses. After being rebuffed, Golovachyov grabbed a knife and stabbed her several dozen times in the stomach before he ultimately slit her throat. He managed to escape, but from then on was listed as a wanted fugitive.

Between November and December 1996, he shot and killed three men in Ukhta during random quarrels. In order to dispose of the bodies, he threw two of them from a bridge into the Pozhnya river, while the body of the third victim was found on the side of a highway in early 1997. Forensic autopsies confirmed that all three had been beaten and then shot in the head, with ballistics establishing that the murder weapon was a TT pistol. A few months later, Golovachyov was arrested and charged with the four murders after the murder weapon was seized from him.

At the end of 1997, during a hearing to extend his detention, the judge unexpectedly released him from custody on his own recognizance, after which Golovachyov fled the Komi Republic and went into hiding. He was put on the federal wanted list but was only apprehended in the Moscow Oblast in 2000, where he had bludgeoned a landlord with an axe.

== Trial and confessions ==
After his arrest, Golovachyov was transferred to the Komi Republic, and in May 2002, he was found guilty of the murders there and sentenced to life imprisonment. People present during the proceedings noted that he was rude and arrogant, that he bragged about being "God's executioner" and that he had the capability to decide who lives and who dies.

Following this, he was returned to Moscow Oblast, where he was convicted of the murder committed there. He was then sent to serve out his sentence in Vologodskiy Pyatak, a high-security prison situated on Ognenny Ostrov.

=== 2014 confession ===
After serving 10 years of his sentence, Golovachyov contacted the Investigative Department of the Investigative Committee of the Russian Federation in Vladimir Oblast, claiming that he wanted to confess to the 1999 murder of a man in Alexandrov. His confession was considered credible, and he was soon transferred to Vladimir Oblast for interrogation. In his confession, Golovachyov claimed that he was living in Alexandrov at the time and had rented a room from a racketeer who was extorting migrant workers. He said that he killed the man during an argument, grabbing an axe which stood by the stove and hitting him on the head with it, claiming that it got stuck in the skull because of the force he had used. Golovachyov then said that he buried the man's body in the basement, cleaned up the apartment and promptly left. After a short investigation, he was charged with this murder, convicted the following year and sentenced to 9 years imprisonment, after which he was returned to Vologodskiy Pyatak.

=== 2019 confessions ===
Five years later, Golovachyov contacted the Moscow Oblast Prosecutor's Office, admitting to three additional murders. According to his testimony, in 1998, he was hiding from the authorities in a rented apartment in Sergiyev Posad, where he lived with several other people. In the spring of that year, he killed his landlord and two of his friends, after which he fled Moscow Oblast and started living as a vagrant, constantly moving between various regions of the country. Golovachyov claimed that he committed the murders after accidentally admitting that he was a wanted man in a drunken rambling, after which he killed the men out of fear they would expose him. After examining his testimony, he was transferred to Moscow Oblast, where he was interrogated and participated in investigative experiments to reconstruct how he carried out the killings.

After the investigations concluded, Golovachyov unexpectedly confessed to five more murders. In this new confession, he said that after the Khotkovo triple murder, he moved to Krasnodar Krai and rented a room from a woman living in Dagomys. After living there for a short time, he killed both her and her 25-year-old son - he then hid out for several weeks in Khosta, where he was living with a young woman. He eventually killed her as well, after which he traveled to Shakhty, in the Rostov Oblast.

Over the course of several days, he viewed a number of advertisements for apartments for sale. He responded to one of them, went to the indicated address, inspected the apartment together with the owners and returned there in the evening, where he found a girl, whom he stabbed to death. He soon left Shakhty and fled to Voronezh, Voronezh Oblast, where, in the same manner, responded to an advertisement, went to the apartment and killed the landlady.

During the interrogations, Golovachyov accurately named the dates, places, victims' facial and physical features, the circumstances and the reasons for each murder. In all of these killings, he followed an identical modus operandi: he would scour for ads for a room or apartment for rent, then kill the homeowners or residents by stabbing between 20 and 40 times and then slitting their throats. Between 2019 and 2022, Golovachyov was transferred between the different regions to re-enact the crime scenes, with officers managing to find witnesses, neighbours and acquaintances of the victims who confirmed that Golovachyov had been a tenant at the time of the killings.

On 11 February 2022, the investigations were finally completed, and Golovachyov was officially charged with 8 murders. As of August 2023, the trial is ongoing and he is yet to be convicted of these offences.

== See also ==
- Lonely hearts killer
- List of Russian serial killers
