= Vodny =

Vodny (Russian: Водный; masculine), Vodnaya (Водная; feminine), or Vodnoye (Водное; neuter) is the name of several inhabited localities in Russia.

== Modern localities ==
Urban localities

- Vodny, Komi Republic, an urban-type settlement under the administrative jurisdiction of the town of republic significance of Ukhta in the Komi Republic; 63°30′N 53°25′E

Rural localities

- Vodny, Republic of Adygea, a settlement in Krasnogvardeysky District of the Republic of Adygea; 45°11′N 39°34′E
- Vodny, Krasnoarmeysky District, Krasnodar Krai, a settlement in Oktyabrsky Rural Okrug of Krasnoarmeysky District in Krasnodar Krai; 45°17′N 38°22′E
- Vodny, Slavyansky District, Krasnodar Krai, a khutor in Petrovsky Rural Okrug of Slavyansky District in Krasnodar Krai; 45°27′N 38°4′E
- Vodny, Kurgan Oblast, a settlement in Berezovsky Selsoviet of Pritobolny District in Kurgan Oblast; 54°49′N 65°7′E
- Vodny, Samara Oblast, a settlement in Krasnoyarsky District of Samara Oblast
- Vodny, Apanasenkovsky District, Stavropol Krai, a settlement in Aygursky Selsoviet of Apanasenkovsky District in Stavropol Krai
- Vodny, Ipatovsky District, Stavropol Krai, a khutor under the administrative jurisdiction of the Town of Ipatovo in Ipatovsky District of Stavropol Krai
- Vodny, Tula Oblast, a settlement in Medvensky Rural Okrug of Leninsky District in Tula Oblast
- Vodnoye, a settlement in Krasnotorovsky Rural Okrug of Zelenogradsky District in Kaliningrad Oblast

== Abolished localities ==
- Vodny, Volgograd Oblast, a settlement in Gornopolyansky Selsoviet under the administrative jurisdiction of Sovetsky City District of the city of oblast significance of Volgograd in Volgograd Oblast; abolished in March 2010
