= Ukhta oil refinery =

Coordinates: 63.572°N 53.724°E

Coat of Arms of Ukhta, featuring oil-well

Ukhta Oil Refinery, commencing in 1745, is the oldest oil refinery in Russia. The current plant in Ukhta was commissioned in 1934 and incorporated into Lukoil in 1999. In 2025 it had a capacity of 3.0 MTPA (Note: Million tonnes per annum (MTPA) refers to the annual crude oil refining capacity of an oil refinery, or the annual handling (transloading/exporting or storage) capacity of an oil terminal, pump, or depot (LPDS).)

Oil springs along the Ukhta River in the Komi Republic were already known in the 17th century. Peter the Great initiated an investigative program of Ukhta oil shale in 1697. In 1745 under the Empress Elizabeth of Russia the first oil well and refinery were built in Ukhta by Fiodor Priadunov. Through the process of distillation of the "rock oil" (petroleum) he produced a kerosene-like substance, which was used in oil lamps by Russian churches and monasteries (though households still relied on candles). In the mid-19th century, industrialist M. K. Sidorov started to drill for oil in this area. It was one of the first oil wells in Russia. There was homecraft oil field in 1920–1921 in Ukhta. The town of Ukhta expanded in the 1940s and 1950s by use of the gulag system of political prisoners' forced labor.

In June 1992, the 25-year-old Roman Abramovich was arrested and briefly imprisoned on charges of theft of government property for allegedly stealing 55 tankers of diesel fuel, worth 3.8 million rubles, from the Ukhta Oil Refinery. Abramovich allegedly used forged documents to intercept a train carrying the fuel in Moscow and redirect the shipment to a military base, where the diesel was then sold. Despite the seriousness of the charges, Abramovich was not ultimately prosecuted. Lawyers later claimed the incident was a misunderstanding, and the case was dropped after the oil refinery was compensated for its losses..

On 12 February 2026, as part of the Deep strike campaign, Ukrainian Liutyi drones struck the Ukhta oil refinery. Some 1,750 km (1,090 mi) from Ukraine, the SBU claimed this was a record for a Ukrainian drone attack until surpassed by the 2000+km Antipinsky refinery strike in June 2026.
