= Mikun (inhabited locality) =

Mikun (Russian: Микунь) is the name of several inhabited localities in Ust-Vymsky District of the Komi Republic, Russia.

Urban localities

- Mikun, a town

Rural localities

- Mikun (rural locality), a village in Aykino Selo Administrative Territory
