= Timofey Podshivalov =

Russian serial killer (born 1991)

- Born: Timofey Mikhailovich Podshivalov; 20 December 1991 (age 34); RSFSR
- Other name: "The Zakamsky Maniac"
- Conviction: Murder
- Penalty: Life imprisonment

Details
- Victims: 4
- Span of crimes: July – August 2011
- Country: Russia
- State: Perm Oblast
- Date apprehended: 29 August 2011
- Imprisoned at: Ognenny Ostrov, Lake Novozero, Vologda Oblast

Timofey Mikhailovich Podshivalov (Russian: Тимофей Михайлович Подшивалов; born 20 December 1991), known as The Zakamsky Maniac (Russian: Закамский маньяк), is a Russian serial killer who operated in Perm in 2011. He is considered one the worst killers in the history of Perm, although his exact motives remain unknown.

== Biography ==
Podshivalov had been convicted twice before the murders: in 2005 for brigandage, and on 28 October 2010, for causing grievous bodily harm. In both cases, he received a suspended sentence.

From 15 July to 28 August 2011, in the Kirovsky City District, he killed four people - three homeless and an employee of a construction firm. On the eve of the first murder, on 14 July, he had just finished reporting to his probation officer. Podshivalov tried to burn the bodies of his first two victims but left the bodies of the last two at the crime scene. All the killings were committed with particular cruelty: he beat his injured victims using his hands and feet, sticks, and stones and even striking them with a knife and then an axe. Podshivalov also stole a tracksuit and a mobile phone from his last victim.

On 29 August 2011, he was arrested and soon confessed to committing the four murders. During a search of his apartment, the last victim's belongings were located. The forensic psychiatric examination recognized Podshivalov as fully sane and reporting of his actions. Initially, on 2 August 2012, he was acquitted by the jury, but the prosecutor's office appealed the decision through the Supreme Court. The case was sent for reconsideration, and this time, the jury found him guilty, saying that the perpetrator did not deserve leniency. On 7 December 2012, the Perm Regional Court sentenced Timofey Podshivalov to life imprisonment in a special regime colony. The Supreme Court of Russia upheld the sentence, and he was transferred to the prison on Ognenny Ostrov.

== See also ==
- List of Russian serial killers
