= Vladimir Belov (serial killer) =

Soviet-Russian brigand and serial killer (born 1972)

- Born: Vladimir Borisovich Belov; 7 January 1972 (age 54); Moscow, RSFSR
- Other name: "The Khovrinsky Maniac"
- Conviction: Murder
- Penalty: Life imprisonment (2005); 19 years (2023)

Details
- Victims: 9+
- Span of crimes: 1991–2002
- Country: Soviet Union, later Russia
- State: Moscow
- Date apprehended: 2002
- Imprisoned at: Ognenny Ostrov, Lake Novozero, Vologda Oblast

Vladimir Borisovich Belov (Russian: Влади́мир Бори́сович Бело́в; born 7 January 1972), known as the Khovrinsky Maniac (Russian: Ховринский маньяк, romanized: Khovrinskiy manyak), is a Soviet-Russian brigand and serial killer, who received his nickname because he committed most of his crimes in the Khovrino District.

== Biography ==
Belov was born in 1972 in Moscow. He received his first term for theft. Freed in 1991, he soon committed a robbery, which ended in murder. On 4 February 1993, Belov was sentenced to 15 years in the Ulyanovsk prison. There he met his future accomplice, Sergei Aleksandrovich Shabanov (b. 1977), also a Moscow native. In 2001, Belov was released on parole, and Shabanov was released three years earlier, also on parole.

The first murder of the duo was committed when Belov's friend Shabanov requested that they kill the merchant Alexander Cheresimov. For 15,000 roubles (equivalent to US$514.25 now), both of them shot him on 15 October 2001. On 26 December, on Festivalnoy Street in Moscow, Belov killed a woman who was returning from work. He stole a bag, purse, earrings, money, and a cake from the deceased. The total value of the items was about 3000 roubles (equivalent to US$102.85 now).

On the night of 6 to 7 January 2002, Belov got into an argument with a 46-year-old man whom he later decided to rob. He waited until the victim reached a residential building on Dorozhnaya Street, whereupon he hit him at least two times with a wooden beam before stealing his bag containing a video camera, personal belongings and documents. The victim died from his injuries a few hours later, while an ambulance was driving him to the hospital. This particular murder was considered a cold case until Belov confessed responsibility in December 2022.

On 25 January, Belov and Shabanov killed another woman, a citizen of Austria, in a deserted yard on Zelenogradskaya Street. Like the previous victim, they stole her bag. The next attack by Belov and Shabanov was carried out on the evening of 10 February on Vyborgskaya Street with the same motives and method, this time stealing 100 roubles and a mobile phone, but the victim miraculously survived. After that attack, all criminal cases were combined into one, and the Interdistrict Investigative Brigade became engaged in it. The survivor helped make a facial composite, and the image was pasted all over Moscow and shown on television. However, the criminals were not caught, and the crimes increased.

On 20 February, a new murder occurred. On 22 February, at a house near Klinskaya Street, Belov and Shabanov killed another woman. The next attack occurred on 27 February near Cherepanovs' Passage, with Belov hitting the victim with a baseball bat, but she furiously resisted and forced him to flee. Just a few hours later, on Lyapidevsky Street, Belov and Shabanov killed their final victim.

Belov and Shabanov were not afraid of being caught: they drove to the crime scene by car, without fearing that someone could remember their number. They committed their crimes against middle-income people, but sometimes there were no more than 3 rubles in the victims' bags. Both got used to murdering, as Belov later said: "After the first corpse, it's hard to sleep, then you get used to it." By that time, the whole of Moscow was talking about Khovrinsky Maniac, especially the frightened residents of the Northern Administrative District. The first surviving victim gave a detailed description of the brigand, from which the investigative brigadiers found out it was the twice-before convicted felon Vladimir Belov.

== Arrest, trial and sentence ==
Belov, who saw that they were coming to arrest him, jumped out of the second-storey window, got into his Opel Vectra and disappeared. However, he and Shabanov were arrested a day later and immediately gave testimony. Belov confessed to all the murders in which he was accused, and at the same time, tried to minimize his role in the crimes. At one of the interrogations, Belov said that if he was ever released, he would kill again. "I can not do anything else", he complained to the investigator.

Belov and Shabanov were recognized as sane. On December 10, 2003, the Moscow City Court sentenced Vladimir Belov to life imprisonment and Shabanov to 20 years imprisonment. The Supreme Court of Russia upheld the verdict of Belov without changes, and he was sent to the "Black Berkut" colony in the Sverdlovsk Oblast.

Subsequently, in 2005, another trial took place, in which Belov and Shabanov were found guilty of as many as 10 attacks, one of which, committed on October 16, 2001, ended in murder. Shabanov was resentenced to 21 years in prison, and Belov's sentence remained unchanged. The exact number of victims of the Khovrinsky Maniac and his accomplice is still unknown. According to an investigator, about 80 victims belong to Belov and Shabanov, but the court found them guilty of only committing 7 murders.

=== Current status ===
In 2010, Belov was moved to Ognenny Ostrov, where he currently remains. In December 2022, he confessed to a murder committed in December 2002. He would later plead guilty and receive an additional 19 years imprisonment to be served concurrently with his already-existing life term.

== In the media and culture ==
- Documentary film "Khovrinsky Maniac" from the series by Vakhtang Mikeladze Documentary Detective
- Documentary film "He killed only women" from the series by Vakhtang Mikeladze Sentenced for life
- Documentary film "The Man with a Bat in His Hands" from the series by Vakhtang Mikeladze Lifelessly Deprived of liberty

== See also ==
- List of Russian serial killers
