= Usogorsk =

Usogorsk Усогорск
- Urban-type settlement

Other transcription(s)
  - Komi: Усогорск
- Interactive map of Usogorsk
- Location of Usogorsk Usogorsk (Komi Republic)
- Coordinates: 63°26′N 48°43′E
- Country: Russia
- Federal subject: Komi Republic
- Administrative district: Udorsky District
- Urban-type settlement administrative territorySelsoviet: Usogorsk Urban-Type Settlement Administrative Territory
- Founded: 1968
- Urban-type settlement status since: 1971

Population (2010 Census)
  - Total: 5,343
  - Estimate (2025): 4,895 (−8.4%)

Administrative status
  - Capital of: Usogorsk Urban-Type Settlement Administrative Territory

Municipal status
  - Municipal district: Udorsky Municipal District
  - Urban settlement: Usogorsk Urban Settlement
  - Capital of: Usogorsk Urban Settlement
- Time zone: UTC+3 (MSK)
- Postal code: 169270
- OKTMO ID: 87640155051

Usogorsk population
- 2010 Census: 5,343
- 2002 Census: 5,583
- 1989 Census: 11,259
- 1979 Census: 9,231

Usogorsk (Russian: Усого́рск; Komi: Усогорск) is an urban locality (an urban-type settlement) in Udorsky District of the Komi Republic, Russia, located at the confluence of the Us and Mezen Rivers. As of the 2010 Census, its population was 5,343.

== History ==
In December 1967, an agreement was signed between the governments of the Soviet Union and the People's Republic of Bulgaria to harvest Soviet timber for the needs of Bulgarian economy. Two months later, a team of Bulgarian builders arrived in Udorsky District and began to build the first of the three planned logging companies. After several years of work, three localities (Usogorsk, Blagoyevo, and Mezhdurechensk) serving the logging operations developed in the area. Urban-type settlement status was granted to Usogorsk in 1971.

== Administrative and municipal status ==
Within the framework of administrative divisions, the urban-type settlement of Usogorsk, together with three rural localities, is incorporated within Udorsky District as Usogorsk Urban-Type Settlement Administrative Territory (an administrative division of the district). As a municipal division, Usogorsk Urban-Type Settlement Administrative Territory is incorporated within Udorsky Municipal District as Usogorsk Urban Settlement.
