= Ognenny Ostrov =

Island and high security prison in Vologda Oblast, Russia

Coordinates: 59°57′14″N 37°14′15″E

Ognenny Ostrov (Russian: Огненный остров, literally: Fire Island) is a small lake island in the central Russian Vologda region. It hosts a high security prison ("Correctional colony No. 5 of the Federal Penitentiary Service Administration for the Vologda Region") for formerly condemned and other dangerous inmates called Vologodskiy Pyatak or simply Pyatak (Russian: Вологодский пятак, literally: Vologda's fiver). Ognenny Ostrov is located about 400 kilometers north of Moscow, on Lake Novozero.

A Russian Orthodox monastery was founded on this island in 1517 by St. Cyril of Novozero after he witnessed "a column of fire" hitting the island. The monastery buildings were used as a backdrop in the 1973 Vasily Shukshin movie “Red Roses” and in some stories by Russian writer Alexandr Yashin.

Following the October Revolution in 1917, the monastery was converted into a prison to hold enemies of the revolution. During the 1930s and 1940s it functioned as a penal colony for victims of the purges of Joseph Stalin. After Stalin's death in 1953, it was turned into a regular prison for non-political dangerous criminals.

In 1997, the prison was converted into a facility housing only prisoners serving life sentences and those formerly sentenced to death; the latter group had their sentences commuted to life following the 1996 moratorium on the death penalty in Russia. The prison, formally known as Prison No. OE 256/5 (ФКУ ИК-5)– and “Pyatak” amongst the inmates (named after the last digit of the formal name) - currently holds approximately 193 prisoners.

The penitentiary, part of the Federal Penitentiary Service, is in the Belozersky District, Vologda Oblast, about 460 kilometres (290 mi) north of Moscow.

Some experts say the prison is more comfortable and the guards less cruel compared to other Russian prisons housing lifers.

== Notable inmates ==
- Artyom Anoufriev, serial killer.
- Vladimir Belov, serial killer and brigand.
- Alexander Bychkov, serial killer and cannibal.
- Andrei Golovachyov, serial killer.
- Dmitry Gridin, serial killer.
- Boris Koshcheev, spree killer.
- Nur-Pashi Kulayev, terrorist.
- Vladimir Marchev, serial killer.
- Yakhiya Mursalimov, serial killer and robber.
- Timofey Podshivalov, serial killer.
- Oleg Wirth, serial killer.

== Media ==
- Three Days and Never Again (Last Visit). Video. 53 min. Director: Alexsandr Goutman, 1998.
- Blatnoi Mir. Video. 82 min. Director: Jouni Hiltunen, 2001.
