= Udorsky District =

Udorsky District Удорский район (Russian)
- District

Other transcription(s)
  - Komi: Удора район
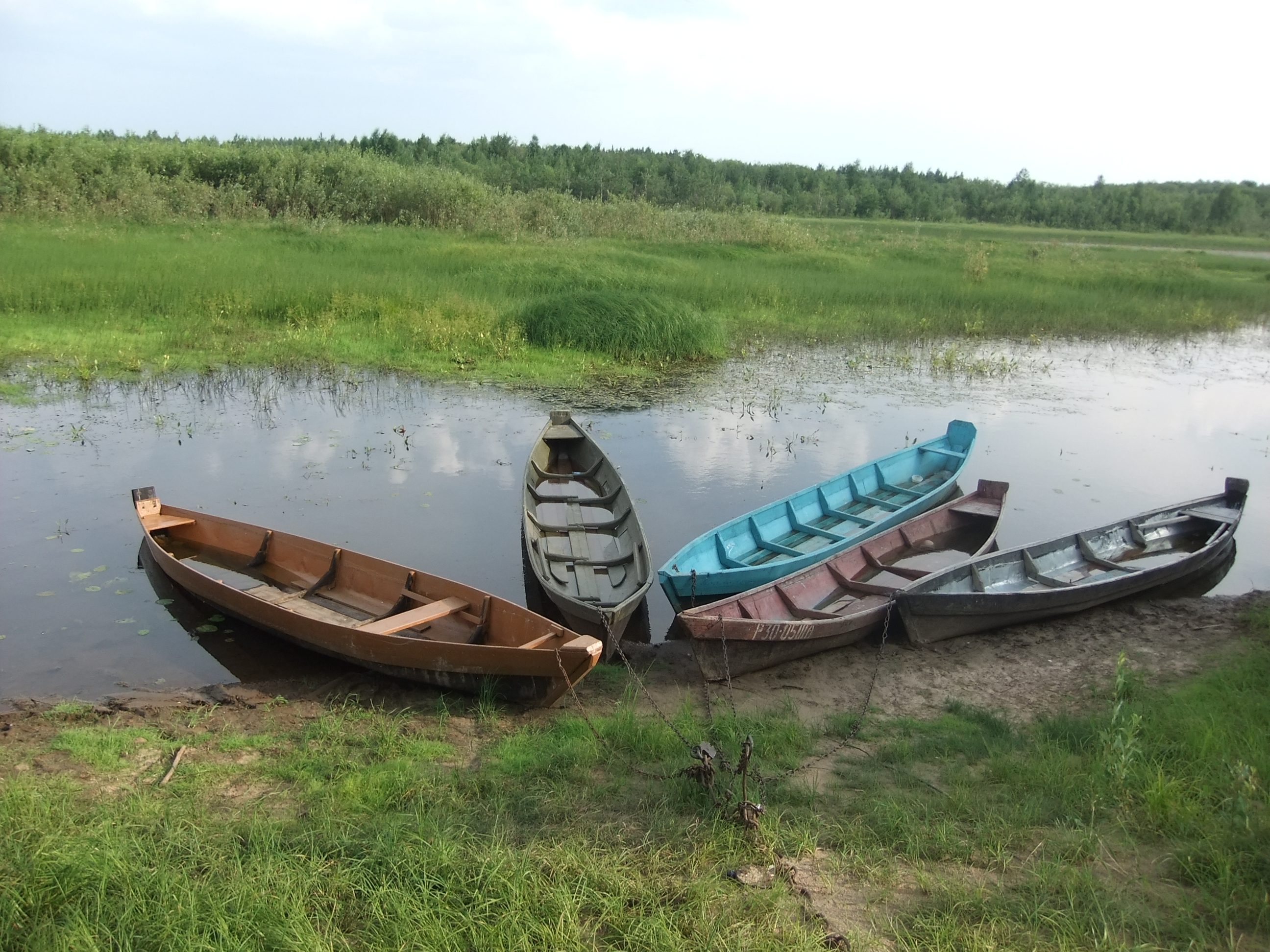
- Boats in Yortom village, Udorsky District

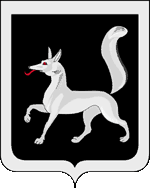
- Coat of arms
- Location of Udorsky District in the Komi Republic
- Coordinates: 63°27′N 48°54′E
- Country: Russia
- Federal subject: Komi Republic
- Administrative center: Koslan

Area
  - Total: 35,800 km^{2} (13,800 sq mi)

Population (2010 Census)
  - Total: 20,400
  - Density: 0.570/km^{2} (1.48/sq mi)
  - Urban: 44.0%
  - Rural: 56.0%

Administrative structure
  - Administrative divisions: 3 Urban-type settlement administrative territories, 9 Selo administrative territories, 3 Settlement administrative territories
  - Inhabited localities: 3 urban-type settlements, 52 rural localities

Municipal structure
  - Municipally incorporated as: Udorsky Municipal District
  - Municipal divisions: 3 urban settlements, 12 rural settlements
- Time zone: UTC+3 (MSK)
- OKTMO ID: 87640000
- Website: http://udora.info

Population of Udorsky District
- 2010 Census: 20,400
- 2002 Census: 25,083
- 1989 Census: 39,729
- 1979 Census: 35,383

Udorsky District (Russian: Удо́рский райо́н; Komi: Удора район, romanized: Udora rajon) is an administrative district (raion), one of the twelve in the Komi Republic, Russia. It is located in the west of the republic. The area of the district is 35,800 square kilometers (13,800 sq mi). Its administrative center is the rural locality (a selo) of Koslan. As of the 2010 Census, the total population of the district was 20,400, with the population of Koslan accounting for 11.2% of that number.

== History of the name ==
The name Udoria in the full official title of the Russian Tsars refers to Udora in the East of Komi, a salient into Arkhangelsk Oblast of Russia in the basin of the Vashka and Mezen Rivers.

== Administrative and municipal status ==
Within the framework of administrative divisions, Udorsky District is one of the twelve in the Komi Republic. It is divided into three urban-type settlement administrative territories (Blagoyevo, Mezhdurechensk, and Usogorsk), nine selo administrative territories, and three settlement administrative territories, all of which comprise fifty-two rural localities. As a municipal division, the district is incorporated as Udorsky Municipal District. The three urban-type settlement administrative territories are incorporated into three urban settlements, and the twelve remaining administrative territories are incorporated into twelve rural settlements within the municipal district. The selo of Koslan serves as the administrative center of both the administrative and municipal district.
