= Ukhta (inhabited locality) =

Ukhta (Russian: Ухта) is the name of several inhabited localities in Russia.

== Modern localities ==
Urban localities

- Ukhta, a town in the Komi Republic; 63°34′N 53°43′E
- Kalevala, Russia, named Ukhta until 1963, an urban locality in the Republic of Karelia; 65°13′N 31°11′E

Rural localities

- Ukhta, Khabarovsk Krai, a selo in Ulchsky District of Khabarovsk Krai

== Renamed localities ==
- Ukhta, before 1963, name of Kalevala, an urban-type settlement in Kalevalsky District of the Republic of Karelia
