= Koslan =

Rural locality in the Komi Republic, Russia

Koslan Кослан
- Interactive map of Koslan
- Location of Koslan Koslan (Komi Republic)
- Coordinates: 63°27′23″N 48°53′56″E
- Country: Russia
- Federal subject: Komi Republic
- Founded: 1554 (Julian)

Population
  - Estimate (2021): 1,879 )
- Time zone: UTC+3 (MSK)
- Postal codes: 169240, 169270
- OKTMO ID: 87640430101

Koslan (Russian: Кослан; Komi: Кослан) is a rural locality (a selo) and the administrative center of Udorsky District of the Komi Republic, Russia. Population: 2,288 (2010 census); 2,679 (2002 census); 3,812 (1989 Soviet census).
