= Dmitry Gridin =

Soviet serial killer

- Born: Dmitry Leonidovich Gridin; 4 March 1968 (age 58); Magnitogorsk, Chelyabinsk Oblast, RSFSR, Soviet Union
- Other names: "The Liftman" "The Last Maniac of the USSR"
- Conviction: Murder with aggravating circumstances (3 counts)
- Penalty: Death; commuted to life imprisonment

Details
- Victims: 3
- Span of crimes: July – November 1989
- Country: Soviet Union
- State: Chelyabinsk
- Date apprehended: 25 November 1989

Dmitry Leonidovich Gridin (Russian: Дми́трий Леони́дович Гри́дин; born 4 March 1968), known as The Liftman (Russian: Лифтёр), is a Soviet serial killer who killed three girls in 1989.

== Biography ==
Gridin was born in 1968 into a well-respected family in Magnitogorsk. His father was the head of the workshop at the city's Iron and Steel Works. Gridin was a student at Magnitogorsk State Technical University, was married, and had a six-month-old daughter.

Gridin committed his first murder on 31 July 1989, killing 16-year-old Zhana Terenchuk on the porch of her house. He attempted three more unsuccessful attacks on girls, one of them giving a detailed description of the "Liftman". A month later, Gridin committed the murders of Danzili Usmanova and Lyudmila Pozdnyakova, leaving a fingerprint at one of the sites. On 25 November 1989, Gridin attempted another attack, but the girl gave him serious resistance, and he ran in fear, dropping his hat and glasses. It was because of these signs that he was soon detained, since it was -20 °C on the street, and Gridin stood out too much from the crowd. In addition, at the time of his arrest, a knife was taken away from him.

The Gridin case caused a wide resonance in society. The people were furious and demanded the public execution of the murderer. The trial began in the fall of 1990 and was accompanied by popular unrest: people demanded that the criminal be sentenced to the most severe sentence.

On 3 October 1990, the Chelyabinsk Regional Court sentenced Gridin to death, but the sentence was commuted to life imprisonment in December 1993. Gridin was imprisoned on Ognenny Ostrov in the Vologda Oblast.

In 2000, Gridin appealed to the United Nations Human Rights Committee, which admitted that there were violations in his case. However, the Russian leadership refused to release him, citing the fact that after his arrest, attacks on women ceased.

In 2013, the crew of the TV programme "Investigation conducted..." visited Dmitry Gridin in the colony in Vologda Oblast. In the interview, he announced his intention to apply for parole in 2014, 25 years after his arrest.

In 2014, he tried to challenge the presidential decree on pardon, but the application was refused. Gridin challenged the refusal, but the Supreme Court of Russia left the court ruling unchanged. In the same year, Gridin, after 25 years of imprisonment, filed a motion on the UDO, but the Belozersky District Court issued a decision to refuse parole. Three years later, in the summer of 2017, Gridin filed a motion for the second time, but the court again refused him, after which Gridin filed an appeal with the Vologoda Regional Court against the Belozersky Court's decision, but the appeal was rejected. After more than 28 years of imprisonment, Gridin has not admitted his guilt.

== See also ==
- List of Russian serial killers
