= Viktor Lyapkalo =

Russian and Soviet painter

Victor Lyapkalo
- Born: Victor Alexandrovich Lyapkalo; 18 September 1956 (age 69); Uchta, Russian SFSR (now Komi Republic)
- Education: Repin Institute of Arts
- Known for: Painting

Viktor Alexandrovich Lyapkalo (Russian: Виктор Александрович Ляпкало, 18 September 1956, Komi Republic) is a Russian and Soviet painter, who lives and works in Saint Petersburg.

== Biography ==
Viktor Alexandrovič Lyapkalo was born on 18 September 1956 in Uchta, Komi Republic. He graduated in 1978 from the Art School of Saratov. From 1979 to 1987 he studied at the Saint Petersburg Academy of Arts and had as teachers Vladimir Gorb and Viktor Reichet. He graduated from this institute, completing the work White Night as part of his undergraduate studies. He specialized in landscapes and nudes.

Since the '80s he has lived and worked in St. Petersburg and is a member of the Union of Artists of this city.

== See also ==
- Leningrad School of Painting
- List of 20th-century Russian painters
- List of painters of Saint Petersburg Union of Artists
- Saint Petersburg Union of Artists
