= Aykino, Komi Republic =

Aykino Айкино
- Selo

Other transcription(s)
  - Komi: Айкатыла
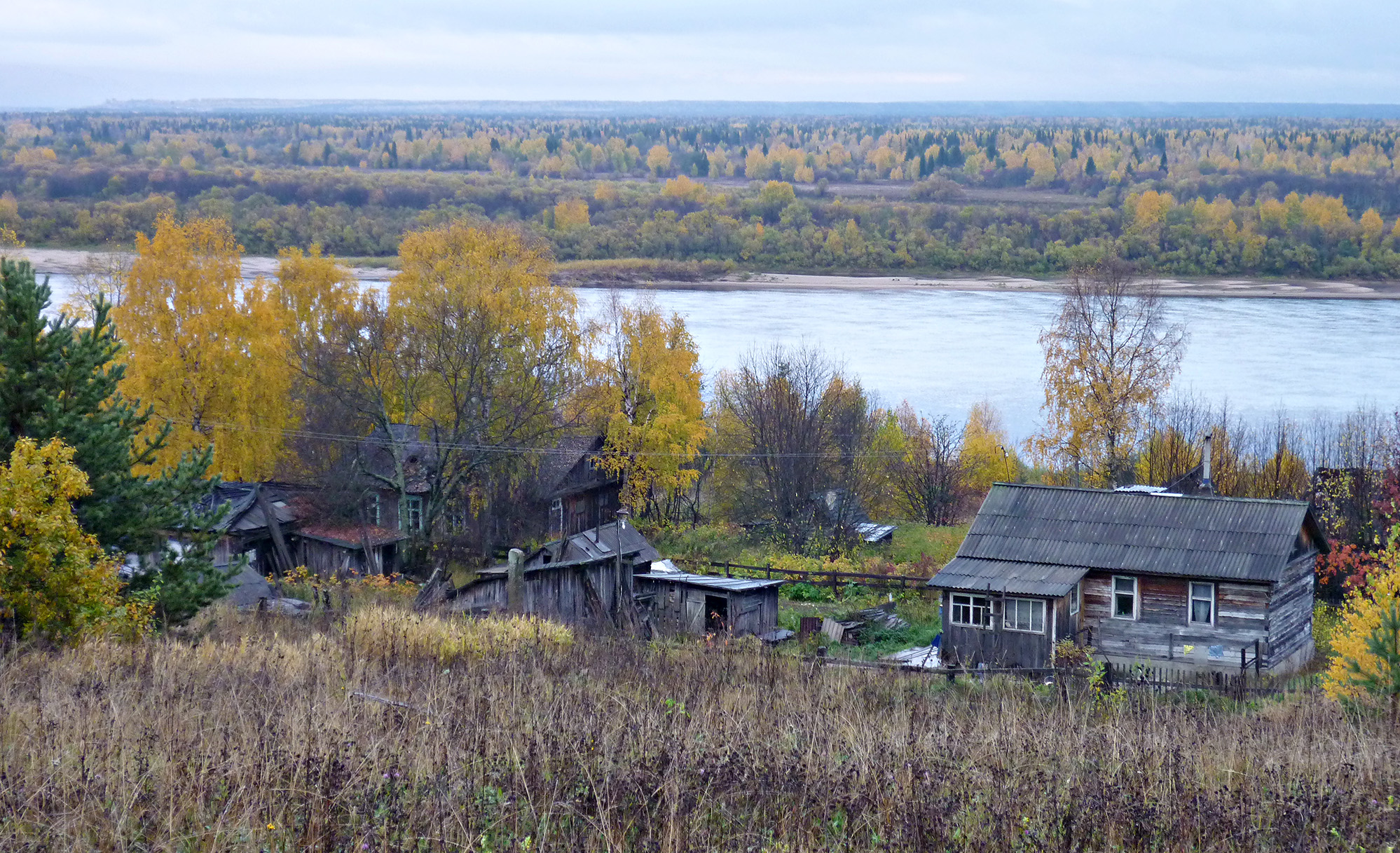
- Interactive map of Aykino
- Location of Aykino Aykino (Komi Republic)
- Coordinates: 62°13′20″N 49°59′41″E
- Country: Russia
- Federal subject: Komi Republic
- Administrative district: Ust-Vymsky District
- Administrative territorySelsoviet: Selo Aykino
- Elevation: 72 m (236 ft)

Population (2010 Census)
  - Total: 3,367
  - Estimate (2021): 3,192 (−5.2%)

Administrative status
  - Capital of: Ust-Vymsky District, Selo Aykino Administrative territory

Municipal status
  - Municipal district: Ust-Vymsky Municipal District
  - Rural settlement: Aykino Rural Settlement
  - Capital of: Ust-Vymsky Municipal District, Aykino Rural Settlement
- Time zone: UTC+3 (MSK)
- Postal code: 169040
- OKTMO ID: 87644405101

Aykino (Russian: Айкино, Komi: Айкатыла, Ajkatyla) is a rural locality (a selo) and the administrative center of Ust-Vymsky District of the Komi Republic, Russia. Population: 3,367 (2010 census); 3,532 (2002 census); 3,895 (1989 Soviet census).
