= Boris Koshcheev =

Russian spree killer (born 1983)

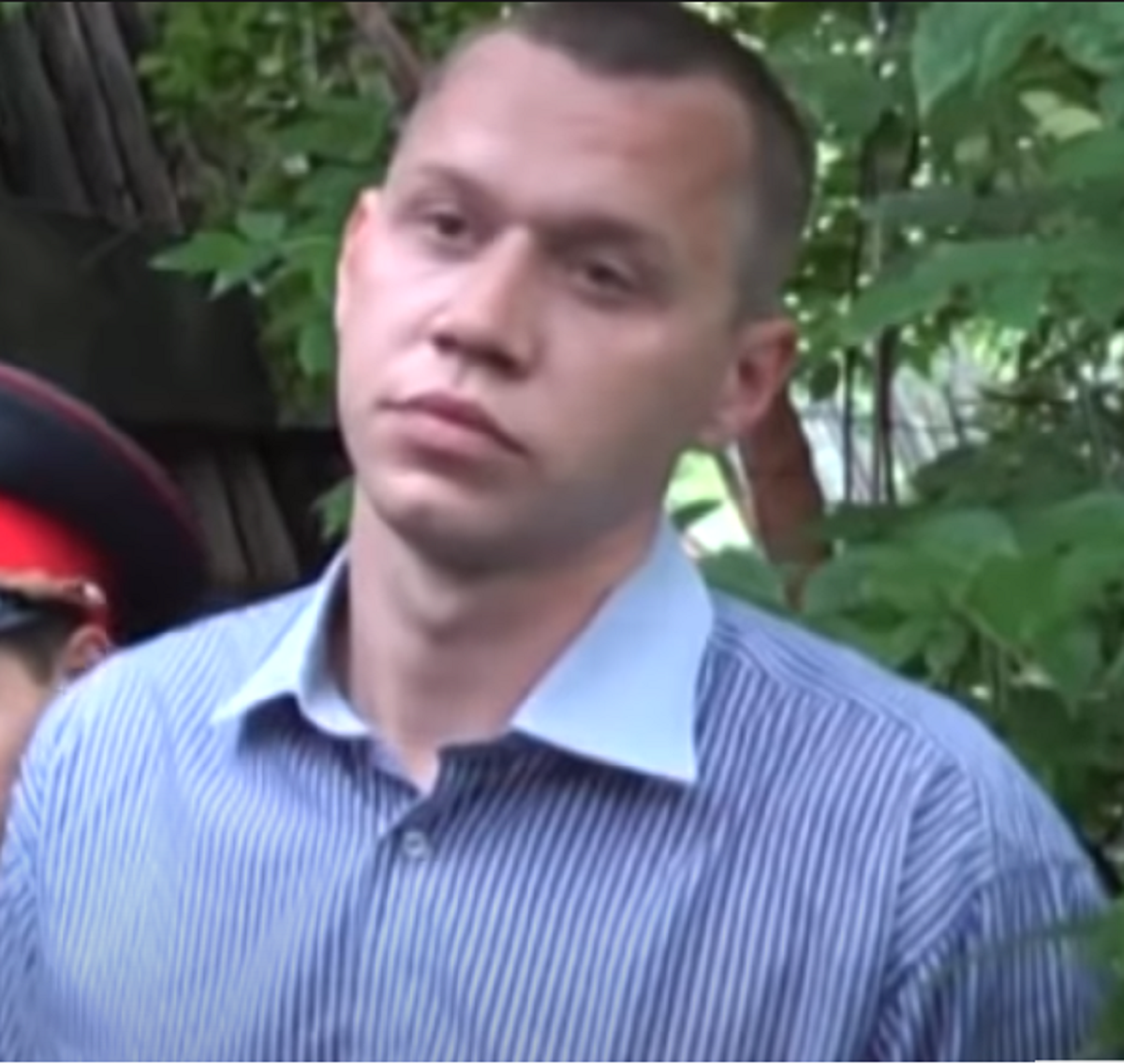
- Born: 5 May 1983 (age 43); Perm, RSFSR
- Other names: "The Perm Maniac" "Koshchey"
- Conviction: Murder

Details
- Victims: 5
- Span of crimes: 13 June 2013 – 10 July 2013
- Country: Russia
- State: Perm
- Date apprehended: 11 July 2013

Boris Valeryevich Koshcheev (Russian: Борис Валерьевич Кощеев; born 5 May 1983 in Perm, RSFSR), known as the "Perm Maniac", is a Russian spree killer who operated in his hometown during the summer of 2013. He is considered to be one of the worst criminals in the history of Perm.

== Biography ==
Koshcheev was born in Perm. He was repeatedly tried for property crimes according to the Russian Criminal Code, but managed to free himself from prison and returned to Perm early summer of 2013. A week after his release, on June 13 in the Motovilikhinsky City District, Koshcheev killed a drinking companion, and then, in front of the cohabitant of the murdered man, robbed the apartment items worth a total of 600 rubles. On June 24, he took possession of the property of a Perm resident in the amount of 20 thousand rubles through fraud. In the period from June 29 and July 10 in Motovilikha and Svedlovsk, Koshcheev killed four women, three of them associated with rape. The criminal stole money, cell phones and jewelry, and sold them in the Central Market, spending most of the money on alcohol. The total damage from Koshcheev's crimes amount to 80 thousand rubles.

On July 11, Koshcheev attacked a girl, but she managed to escape, as the killer was distracted by her cell phone. Koshcheev was arrested on the same day. The surviving victim identified him, and he subsequently confessed and described his crimes in detail. Forensic psychiatric examinations found him sane. On December 31, 2013, the Perm Regional Court found Koshcheev guilty of 5 murders and sentenced him to life imprisonment in a special regime colony. All applications for a pardon were rejected, and the Supreme Court of Russia left the verdict unchanged. He is currently serving his sentence on Ognenny Ostrov, in the Vologda Oblast.
