= Knyazhpogostsky District =

Knyazhpogostsky District Княжпогостский район (Russian)
- District

Other transcription(s)
  - Komi: Княжпогост район
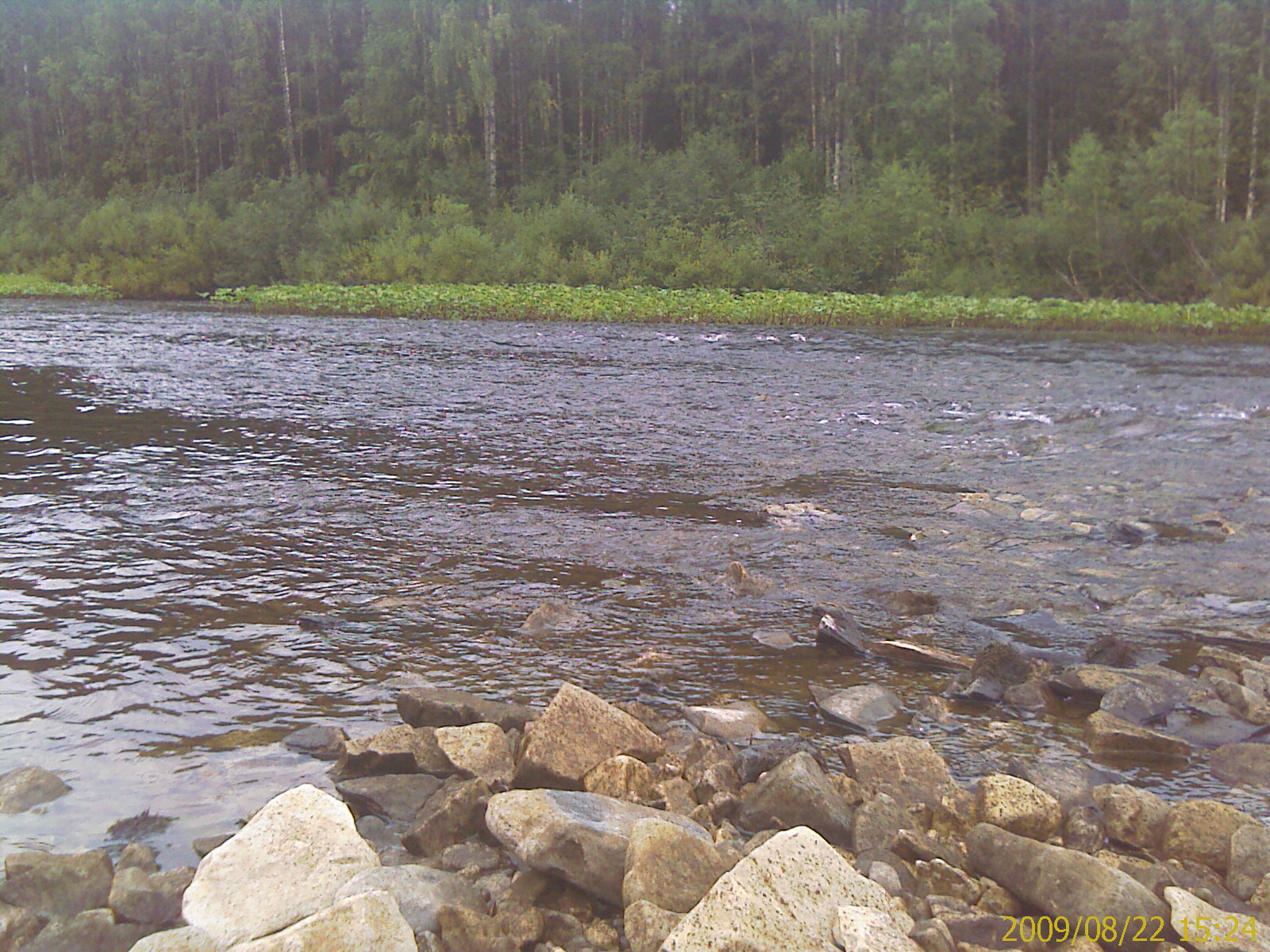
- Landscape in Knyazhpogostsky District

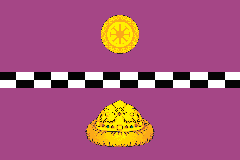
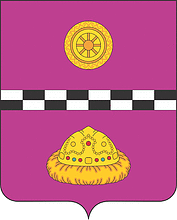
- Flag Coat of arms
- Location of Knyazhpogostsky District in the Komi Republic
- Coordinates: 62°35′N 50°51′E
- Country: Russia
- Federal subject: Komi Republic
- Established: 14 July 1939
- Administrative center: Yemva

Area
  - Total: 25,080 km^{2} (9,680 sq mi)

Population (2010 Census)
  - Total: 23,432
  - Density: 0.9343/km^{2} (2.420/sq mi)
  - Urban: 72.8%
  - Rural: 27.2%

Administrative structure
  - Administrative divisions: 1 Town of district significance administrative territories, 1 Urban-type settlement administrative territories, 3 selo administrative territories, 5 settlement administrative territories
  - Inhabited localities: 1 cities/towns, 1 urban-type settlements, 45 rural localities

Municipal structure
  - Municipally incorporated as: Knyazhpogostsky Municipal District
  - Municipal divisions: 2 urban settlements, 8 rural settlements
- Time zone: UTC+3 (MSK)
- OKTMO ID: 87608000
- Website: http://www.mrk11.ru/

Population of Knyazhpogostsky District
- 2010 Census: 23,432
- 2002 Census: 29,688
- 1989 Census: 40,359
- 1979 Census: 38,370

Knyazhpogostsky District (Russian: Княжпогостский райо́н; Komi: Княжпогост район, Knjažpogost rajon) is an administrative district (raion), one of the twelve in the Komi Republic, Russia. It is located in the west of the republic. The area of the district is 25,080 square kilometers (9,680 sq mi). Its administrative center is the town of Yemva. As of the 2010 Census, the total population of the district was 23,432, with the population of Yemva accounting for 62.2% of that number.

== Administrative and municipal status ==
Within the framework of administrative divisions, Knyazhpogostsky District is one of the twelve in the Komi Republic. It is divided into one town of district significance administrative territory (Yemva), one urban-type settlement administrative territory (Sindor), three selo administrative territories, and five settlement administrative territories, all of which comprise forty-five rural localities. As a municipal division, the district is incorporated as Knyazhpogostsky Municipal District. Yemva Town of District Significance Administrative Territory and Sindor Urban-Type Settlement Administrative Territory are incorporated into two urban settlements, and the eight remaining administrative territories are incorporated into eight rural settlements within the municipal district. The town of Yemva serves as the administrative center of both the administrative and municipal districts.
