= Usinsk =

Town in the Komi Republic, Russia

Usinsk Усинск
- Town

Other transcription(s)
  - Komi: Ускар
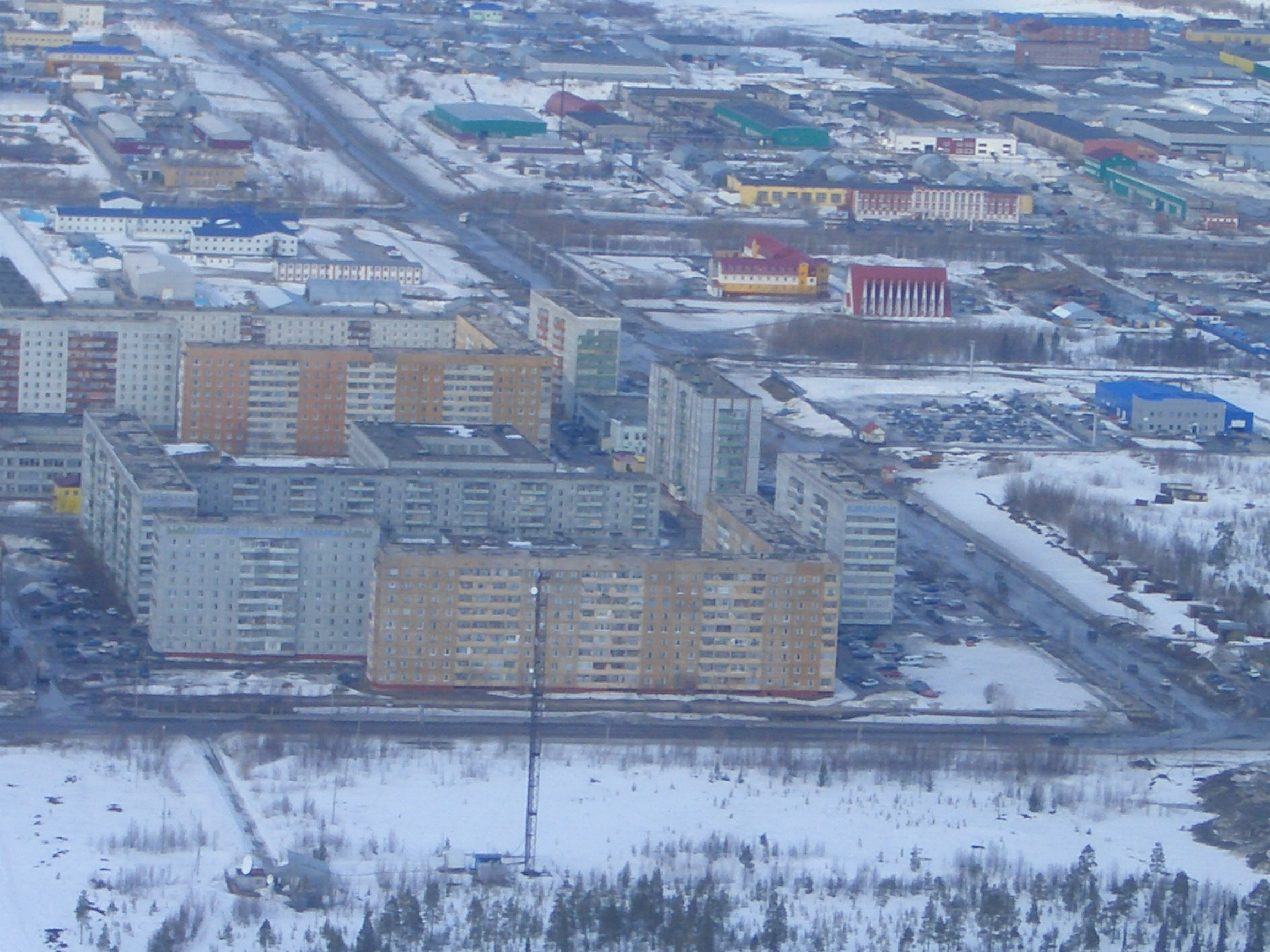
- Aerial view of Usinsk

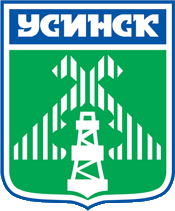
- Coat of arms
- Interactive map of Usinsk
- Location of Usinsk Usinsk (Komi Republic)
- Coordinates: 66°00′N 57°32′E
- Country: Russia
- Federal subject: Komi Republic
- Founded: 1966
- Town status since: 1984

Government
  - Mayor: Alexander Tyan
- Elevation: 67 m (220 ft)

Population (2010 Census)
  - Total: 40,827
  - Estimate (2025): 31,192 (−23.6%)

Administrative status
  - Subordinated to: town of republic significance of Usinsk
  - Capital of: town of republic significance of Usinsk

Municipal status
  - Urban okrug: Usinsk Urban Okrug
  - Capital of: Usinsk Urban Okrug
- Time zone: UTC+3 (MSK)
- Postal codes: 169710, 169711, 169712
- Dialing code: +7 82144
- OKTMO ID: 87723000001
- Website: city.usinsk.ru

Usinsk (Russian: Усинск; Komi: Ускар, Uskar) is a town in the Komi Republic, Russia, located 757 kilometers (470 mi) east of the republic's capital city of Syktyvkar and 100 kilometers (62 mi) north of the town of Pechora, on the northern bank of the Usa River, 30 kilometers (19 mi) before its confluence with the Pechora River. Population: 40,827 (2010 census); 45,358 (2002 census); 47,219 (1989 Soviet census).

== History ==
Usinsk was founded in 1966 as a settlement at the newly discovered deposits of petroleum in the north of the Komi Republic. Town status was granted to it in 1984.

== Administrative and municipal status ==
Within the framework of administrative divisions, together with the urban-type settlement of Parma and eighteen rural localities, incorporated as the town of republic significance of Usinsk—It is an administrative unit with the status equal to that of the districts. As a municipal division, the town of republic significance of Usinsk is incorporated as Usinsk Urban Okrug.

== Economy ==
The town is the center for the production of oil and gas in the Komi Republic. Three quarters of all the oil produced in the republic comes from the fields in the territory around Usinsk. In 1980, the town was connected to the Pechora Railway by a 108-kilometer (67 mi) long sidetrack.
