= Parma, Usinsk, Komi Republic =

Parma Парма
- Urban-type settlement

Other transcription(s)
  - Komi: Парма
- Interactive map of Parma
- Location of Parma Parma (Komi Republic)
- Coordinates: 65°57′N 57°27′E
- Country: Russia
- Federal subject: Komi Republic
- Urban-type settlement administrative territorySelsoviet: Parma Urban-Type Settlement Administrative Territory

Population (2010 Census)
  - Total: 1,248
  - Estimate (2025): 681 (−45.4%)

Administrative status
  - Subordinated to: town of republic significance of Usinsk
  - Capital of: Parma Urban-Type Settlement Administrative Territory

Municipal status
  - Urban okrug: Usinsk Urban Okrug
- Time zone: UTC+3 (MSK)
- Postal code: 169731
- OKTMO ID: 87723000056

Parma population
- 2010 Census: 1,248
- 2002 Census: 1,387
- 1989 Census: 8,791
- 1979 Census: 11,870

Parma (Russian: Парма; Komi: Парма) is an urban locality (an urban-type settlement) under the administrative jurisdiction of the town of republic significance of Usinsk in the Komi Republic, Russia. As of the 2010 Census, its population was 1,248.

== Administrative and municipal status ==
Within the framework of administrative divisions, the urban-type settlement of Parma is incorporated as Parma Urban-Type Settlement Administrative Territory, which is subordinated to the town of republic significance of Usinsk. Within the framework of municipal divisions, Parma is a part of Usinsk Urban Okrug.
