= Voyvozh =

Voyvozh Войвож
- Urban-type settlement

Other transcription(s)
  - Komi: Войвож
- Interactive map of Voyvozh
- Location of Voyvozh Voyvozh (Komi Republic)
- Coordinates: 62°54′N 54°58′E
- Country: Russia
- Federal subject: Komi Republic
- Urban-type settlement administrative territorySelsoviet: Voyvozh Urban-Type Settlement Administrative Territory
- Founded: 1945

Population (2010 Census)
  - Total: 3,387
  - Estimate (2025): 1,678 (−50.5%)

Administrative status
  - Subordinated to: town of republic significance of Sosnogorsk
  - Capital of: Voyvozh Urban-Type Settlement Administrative Territory

Municipal status
  - Municipal district: Sosnogorsk Municipal District
  - Urban settlement: Voyvozh Urban Settlement
  - Capital of: Voyvozh Urban Settlement
- Time zone: UTC+3 (MSK)
- Postal code: 169534
- OKTMO ID: 87626153051

Voyvozh population
- 2010 Census: 3,387
- 2002 Census: 3,920
- 1989 Census: 5,517
- 1979 Census: 5,686

Voyvozh (Russian: Войво́ж; Komi: Войвож, Vojvož) is an urban locality (an urban-type settlement) under the administrative jurisdiction of the town of republic significance of Sosnogorsk in the Komi Republic, Russia. As of the 2010 Census, its population was 3,387.

== Administrative and municipal status ==
Within the framework of administrative divisions, the urban-type settlement of Voyvozh, together with two rural localities, is incorporated as Voyvozh Urban-Type Settlement Administrative Territory, which is subordinated to the town of republic significance of Sosnogorsk. As a municipal division, Voyvozh Urban-Type Settlement Administrative Territory is incorporated within Sosnogorsk Municipal District as Voyvozh Urban Settlement.
