= Borovoy, Komi Republic =

Borovoy Боровой
- Urban-type settlement

Other transcription(s)
  - Komi: Боровӧй
- Interactive map of Borovoy
- Location of Borovoy Borovoy (Komi Republic)
- Coordinates: 63°14′N 52°53′E
- Country: Russia
- Federal subject: Komi Republic
- Urban-type settlement administrative territorySelsoviet: Borovoy Urban-Type Settlement Administrative Territory
- Founded: 1956
- Elevation: 179 m (587 ft)

Population (2010 Census)
  - Total: 1,560
  - Estimate (2025): 703 (−54.9%)

Administrative status
  - Subordinated to: town of republic significance of Ukhta
  - Capital of: Borovoy Urban-Type Settlement Administrative Territory

Municipal status
  - Urban okrug: Ukhta Urban Okrug
- Time zone: UTC+3 (MSK)
- Postal code: 169360
- OKTMO ID: 87725000056

Borovoy population
- 2010 Census: 1,560
- 2002 Census: 1,916
- 1989 Census: 2,580
- 1979 Census: 2,021

Borovoy (Russian: Борово́й; Komi: Боровӧй, Borovöj) is an urban locality (an urban-type settlement) under the administrative jurisdiction of the town of republic significance of Ukhta in the Komi Republic, Russia. As of the 2010 Census, its population was 1,560.

== Administrative and municipal status ==
Within the framework of administrative divisions, the urban-type settlement of Borovoy, together with one rural locality (the settlement of Tobys), is incorporated as Borovoy Urban-Type Settlement Administrative Territory, which is subordinated to the town of republic significance of Ukhta. Within the framework of municipal divisions, Borovoy is a part of Ukhta Urban Okrug.
