= Sindor =

Sindor Синдор
- Urban-type settlement

Other transcription(s)
  - Komi: Синдор
- Interactive map of Sindor
- Location of Sindor Sindor (Komi Republic)
- Coordinates: 62°52′N 51°53′E
- Country: Russia
- Federal subject: Komi Republic
- Administrative district: Knyazhpogostsky District
- Urban-type settlement administrative territorySelsoviet: Sindor Urban-Type Settlement Administrative Territory

Population (2010 Census)
  - Total: 2,478
  - Estimate (2025): 1,968 (−20.6%)

Administrative status
  - Capital of: Sindor Urban-Type Settlement Administrative Territory

Municipal status
  - Municipal district: Knyazhpogostsky Municipal District
  - Urban settlement: Sindor Urban Settlement
  - Capital of: Sindor Urban Settlement
- Time zone: UTC+3 (MSK)
- Postal code: 169225
- OKTMO ID: 87608162051

Sindor population
- 2010 Census: 2,478
- 2002 Census: 3,030
- 1989 Census: 2,724
- 1979 Census: 2,499

Sindor (Russian: Синдор; Komi: Синдор) is an urban locality (an urban-type settlement) in Knyazhpogostsky District of the Komi Republic, Russia. As of the 2010 Census, its population was 2,478.

== Administrative and municipal status ==
Within the framework of administrative divisions, the urban-type settlement of Sindor, together with two rural localities, is incorporated within Knyazhpogostsky District as Sindor Urban-Type Settlement Administrative Territory (an administrative division of the district). As a municipal division, Sindor Urban-Type Settlement Administrative Territory is incorporated within Knyazhpogostsky Municipal District as Sindor Urban Settlement.
