= Nizhny Odes =

Nizhny Odes Нижний Одес
- Urban-type settlement

Other transcription(s)
  - Komi: Улыс Одес
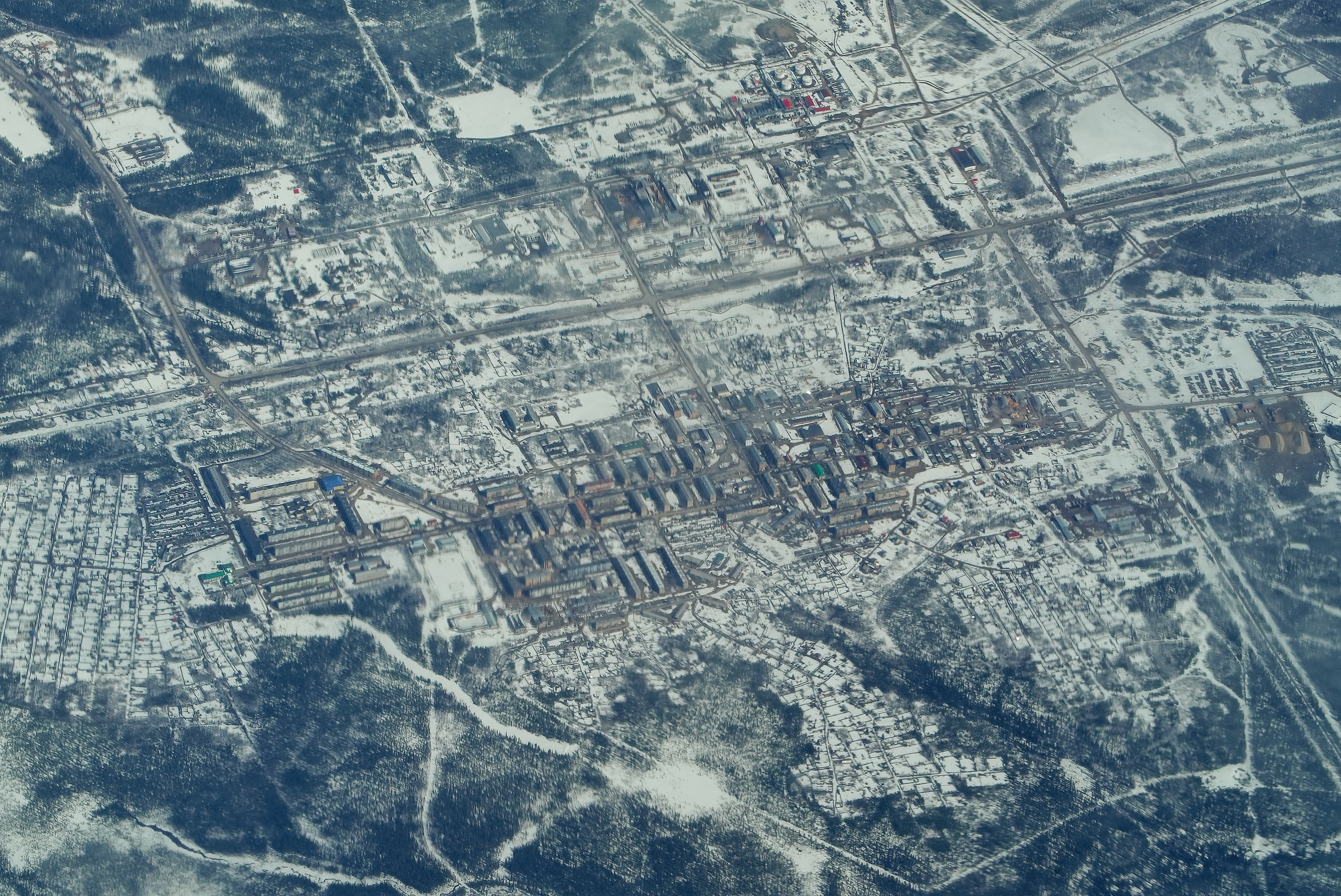
- Aerial view, 2025

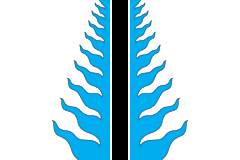
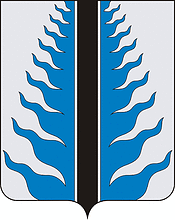
- Flag Coat of arms
- Interactive map of Nizhny Odes
- Location of Nizhny Odes Nizhny Odes (Komi Republic)
- Coordinates: 63°38′N 54°51′E
- Country: Russia
- Federal subject: Komi Republic
- Urban-type settlement administrative territorySelsoviet: Nizhny Odes Urban-Type Settlement Administrative Territory
- Founded: 1960

Population (2010 Census)
  - Total: 9,680
  - Estimate (2025): 7,204 (−25.6%)

Administrative status
  - Subordinated to: town of republic significance of Sosnogorsk
  - Capital of: Nizhny Odes Urban-Type Settlement Administrative Territory

Municipal status
  - Municipal district: Sosnogorsk Municipal District
  - Urban settlement: Nizhny Odes Urban Settlement
  - Capital of: Nizhny Odes Urban Settlement
- Time zone: UTC+3 (MSK)
- Postal code: 169523
- OKTMO ID: 87626159051
- Website: нижний-одес.рф

Nizhny Odes population
- 2010 Census: 9,680
- 2002 Census: 11,745
- 1989 Census: 12,594
- 1979 Census: 10,510

Nizhny Odes (Russian: Ни́жний О́дес; Komi: Улыс Одес, Ulys Odes) is an urban locality (an urban-type settlement) under the administrative jurisdiction of the town of republic significance of Sosnogorsk in the Komi Republic, Russia. As of the 2010 Census, its population was 9,680.

== Administrative and municipal status ==
Within the framework of administrative divisions, the urban-type settlement of Nizhny Odes, together with one rural locality (the settlement of Konashyel), is incorporated as Nizhny Odes Urban-Type Settlement Administrative Territory, which is subordinated to the town of republic significance of Sosnogorsk. As a municipal division, Nizhny Odes Urban-Type Settlement Administrative Territory is incorporated within Sosnogorsk Municipal District as Nizhny Odes Urban Settlement.
