= Izhemsky District =

Izhemsky District Ижемский район (Russian)
- District

Other transcription(s)
  - Komi: Изьва район
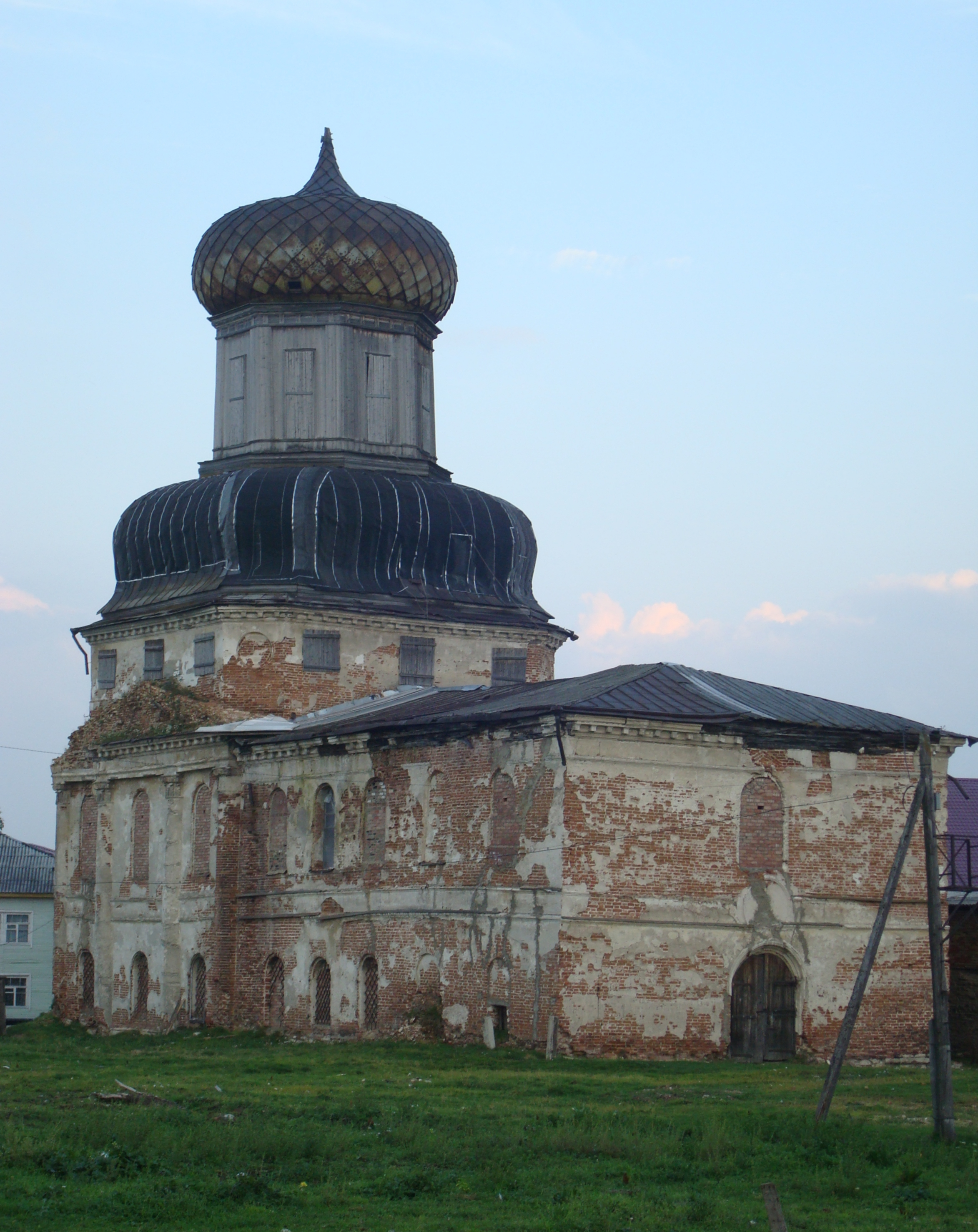
- Church in Izhma, Izhemsky District

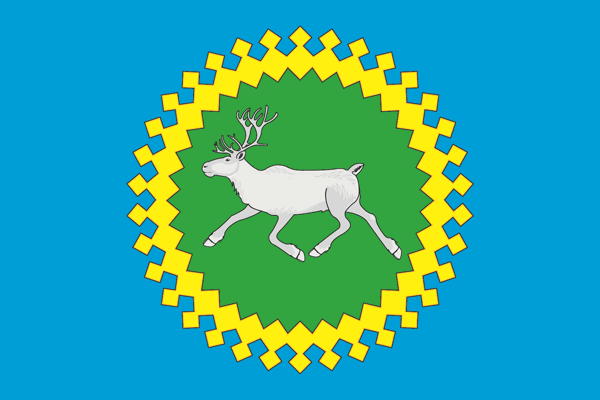
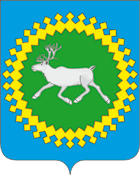
- Flag Coat of arms
- Location of Izhemsky District in the Komi Republic
- Coordinates: 65°01′N 53°55′E
- Country: Russia
- Federal subject: Komi Republic
- Established: 1929
- Administrative center: Izhma

Area
  - Total: 18,420 km^{2} (7,110 sq mi)

Population (2010 Census)
  - Total: 18,771
  - Density: 1.019/km^{2} (2.639/sq mi)
  - Urban: 0%
  - Rural: 100%

Administrative structure
  - Administrative divisions: 8 selo administrative territories, 2 settlement administrative territories
  - Inhabited localities: 34 rural localities

Municipal structure
  - Municipally incorporated as: Izhemsky Municipal District
  - Municipal divisions: 0 urban settlements, 10 rural settlements
- Time zone: UTC+3 (MSK)
- OKTMO ID: 87604000
- Website: http://www.admizhma.ru/

Population of Izhemsky District
- 2010 Census: 18,771
- 2002 Census: 21,511
- 1989 Census: 23,315
- 1979 Census: 24,305

Izhemsky District (Russian: Иже́мский райо́н; Komi: Изьва район, Iźva rajon) is an administrative district (raion), one of the twelve in the Komi Republic, Russia. It is located in the north of the republic. The area of the district is 18,420 square kilometers (7,110 sq mi). Its administrative center is the rural locality (a selo) of Izhma. As of the 2010 Census, the total population of the district was 18,771, with the population of Izhma accounting for 20.0% of that number.

== Administrative and municipal status ==
Within the framework of administrative divisions, Izhemsky District is one of the twelve in the Komi Republic. The district is divided into eight selo administrative territories and two settlement administrative territories, which comprise thirty-four rural localities. As a municipal division, the district is incorporated as Izhemsky Municipal District. Its ten administrative territories are incorporated as ten rural settlements within the municipal district. The selo of Izhma serves as the administrative center of both the administrative and municipal district.

== Demographics ==
Ethnic Komi make up the largest share of total population (86.5% in 1989). The district is the only one in the republic where birth rate is at or above replaceable levels.
