= Izhma, Komi Republic =

Selo in Izhemsky District, Komi Republic, Russia

Izhma Ижма
- Selo

Other transcription(s)
  - Komi: И́зьва
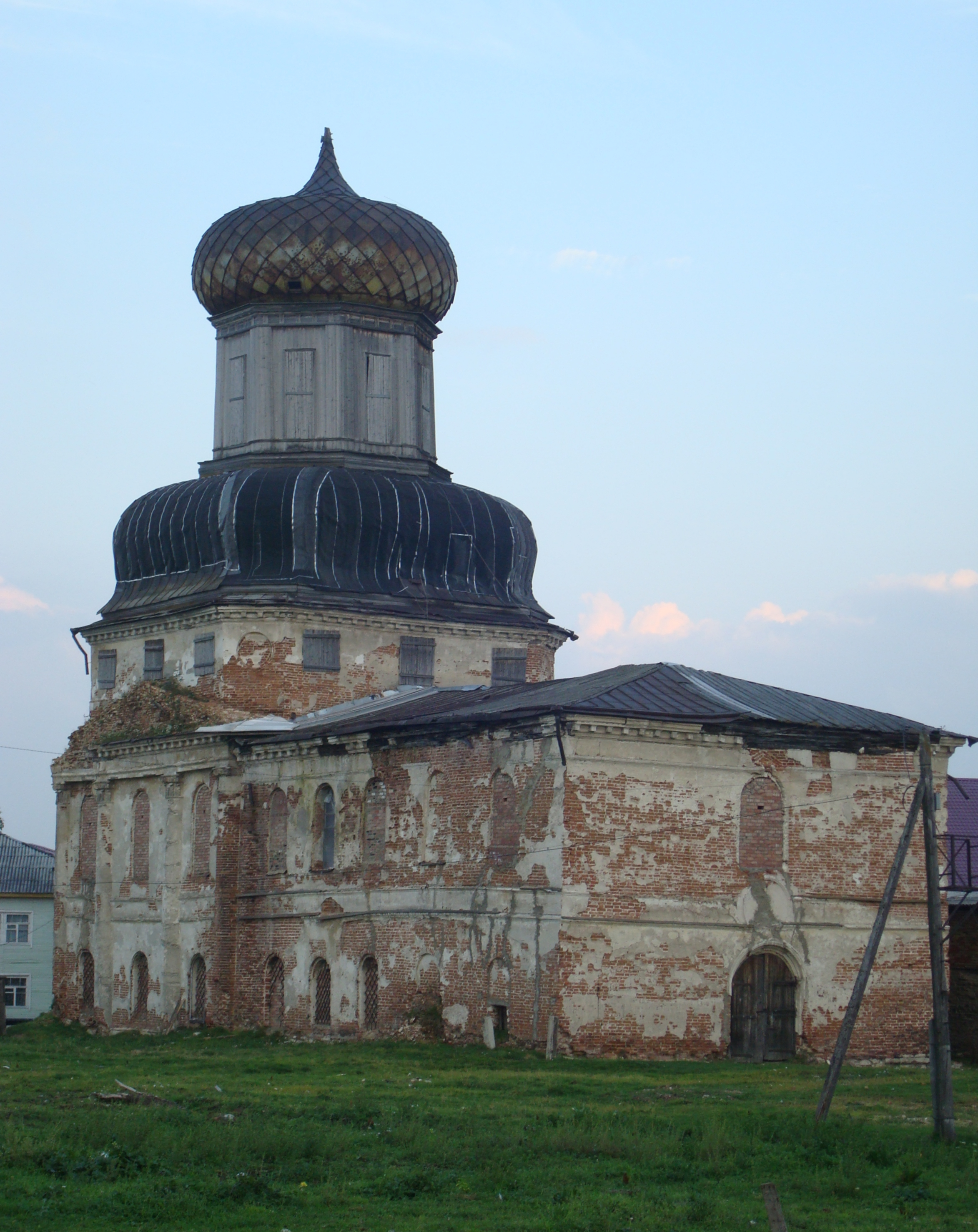

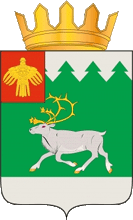
- Flag Coat of arms
- Interactive map of Izhma
- Location of Izhma Izhma (Komi Republic)
- Coordinates: 65°00′36″N 53°54′46″E
- Country: Russia
- Federal subject: Komi Republic
- Administrative district: Izhemsky District
- Administrative territorySelsoviet: Selo Izhma
- Founded: 1567 (Julian)

Population (2010 Census)
  - Total: 3,753
  - Estimate (2021): 3,917 (+4.4%)

Administrative status
  - Capital of: Izhemsky District, Selo Izhma Administrative territory

Municipal status
  - Municipal district: Izhemsky Municipal District
  - Rural settlement: Izhma Rural Settlement
  - Capital of: Izhemsky Municipal District, Izhma Rural Settlement
- Time zone: UTC+3 (MSK)
- Postal code: 169460
- OKTMO ID: 87604420101

Izhma (Russian: Ижма, Komi: И́зьва, Iźva) is a rural locality (a selo) and the administrative center of Izhemsky District of the Komi Republic, Russia.

Population: 3,753 (2010 census); 3,786 (2002 census); 3,595 (1989 Soviet census).

It lies on the Izhma River. Its airport was closed in 2003 but still functions as a helipad.
