= Ukhta (river) =

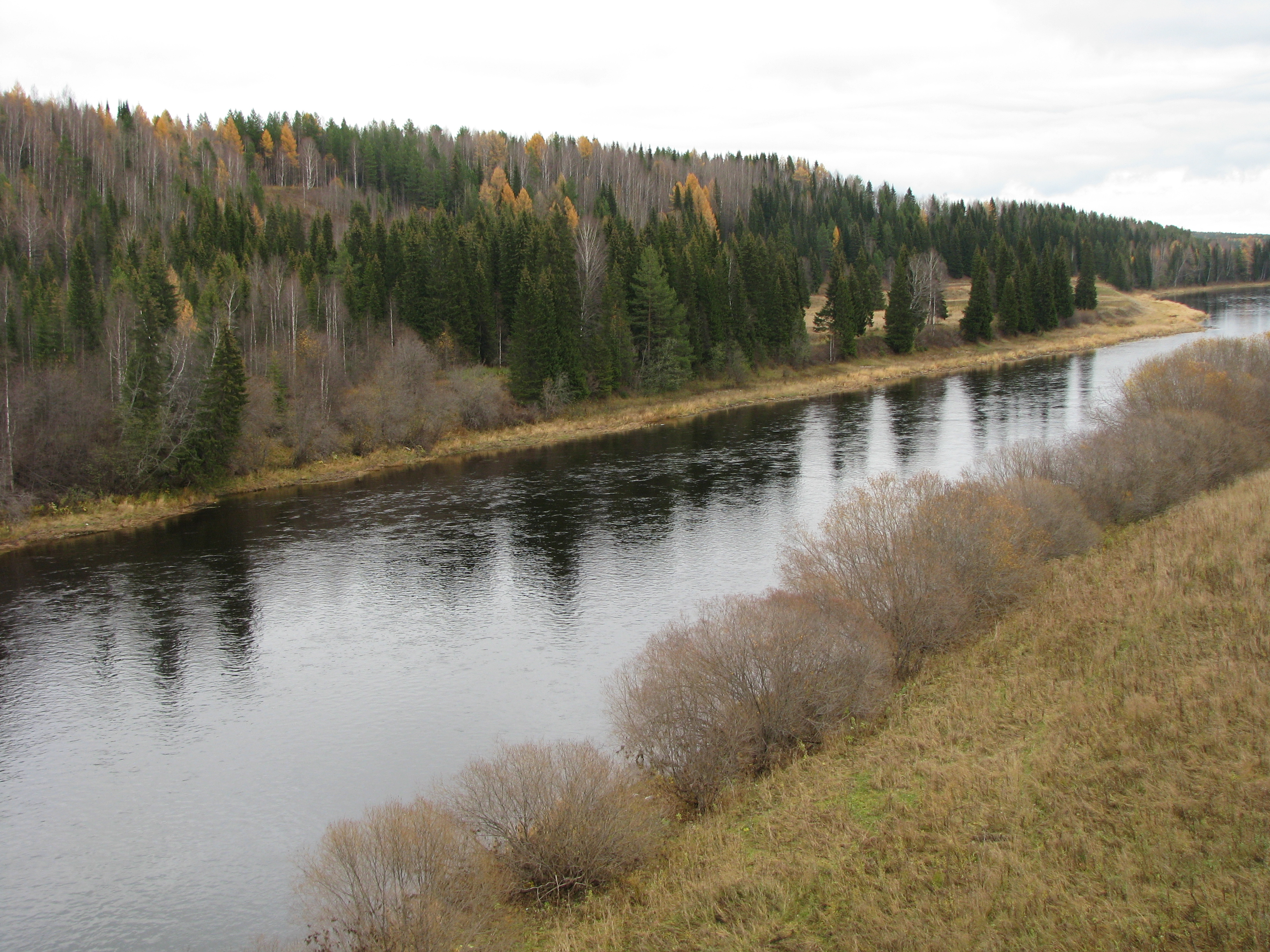
- Ukhta River between the city of Ukhta and Sosnogorsk

Location
- Country: Russia

Physical characteristics
- Source
  - location: Timan Ridge
- Mouth: Izhma
  - coordinates: 63.6139°N 53.8903°E
- Length: 199 km (124 mi)
- Basin size: 4,510 km^{2} (1,740 sq mi)
- Discharge
  - average: 48.9 m^{3}/s (1,730 cu ft/s) (13 km or 8.1 mi from the mouth)

Basin features
- Progression: Izhma→ Pechora→ Barents Sea

The Ukhta (Russian: Ухта́, Komi: Уква - Ukva) is a river in the Komi Republic of Russia. It is a left tributary of the Izhma (in the Pechora's drainage basin). It is 199 kilometres (124 mi) long, with a drainage basin of 4,510 square kilometres (1,740 mi^{2}). Its average discharge is 48.9 cubic metres per second (1,730 cu ft/s) 13 kilometres (8 mi) from its mouth).

The river freezes over in October or November and remains icebound until April.

The Ukhta has its sources in the Timan Ridge. It flows first to the south and later turns east. It flows through the city of Ukhta and joins the Izhma at the town of Sosnogorsk. The river is fast, with many rapids.
