= Shudayag =

Shudayag Шудаяг
- Urban-type settlement

Other transcription(s)
  - Komi: Шудаяг
- Interactive map of Shudayag
- Location of Shudayag Shudayag (Komi Republic)
- Coordinates: 61°31′N 53°36′E
- Country: Russia
- Federal subject: Komi Republic
- Urban-type settlement administrative territorySelsoviet: Shudayag Urban-Type Settlement Administrative Territory
- Founded: 1931

Population (2010 Census)
  - Total: 3,411
  - Estimate (2025): 2,857 (−16.2%)

Administrative status
  - Subordinated to: town of republic significance of Ukhta
  - Capital of: Shudayag Urban-Type Settlement Administrative Territory

Municipal status
  - Urban okrug: Ukhta Urban Okrug
- Time zone: UTC+3 (MSK)
- Postal code: 169338
- OKTMO ID: 87725000066

Shudayag population
- 2010 Census: 3,411
- 2002 Census: 3,625
- 1989 Census: 5,138
- 1979 Census: 4,609

Shudayag (Russian: Шудаяг; Komi: Шудаяг, Šudajag) is an urban locality (an urban-type settlement) under the administrative jurisdiction of the town of republic significance of Ukhta in the Komi Republic, Russia. As of the 2010 Census, its population was 3,411.

== Administrative and municipal status ==
Within the framework of administrative divisions, the urban-type settlement of Shudayag is incorporated as Shudayag Urban-Type Settlement Administrative Territory, which is subordinated to the town of republic significance of Ukhta. Within the framework of municipal divisions, Shudayag is a part of Ukhta Urban Okrug.
