= Zheshart =

Zheshart Жешарт
- Urban-type settlement

Other transcription(s)
  - Komi: Зӧвсьӧрт
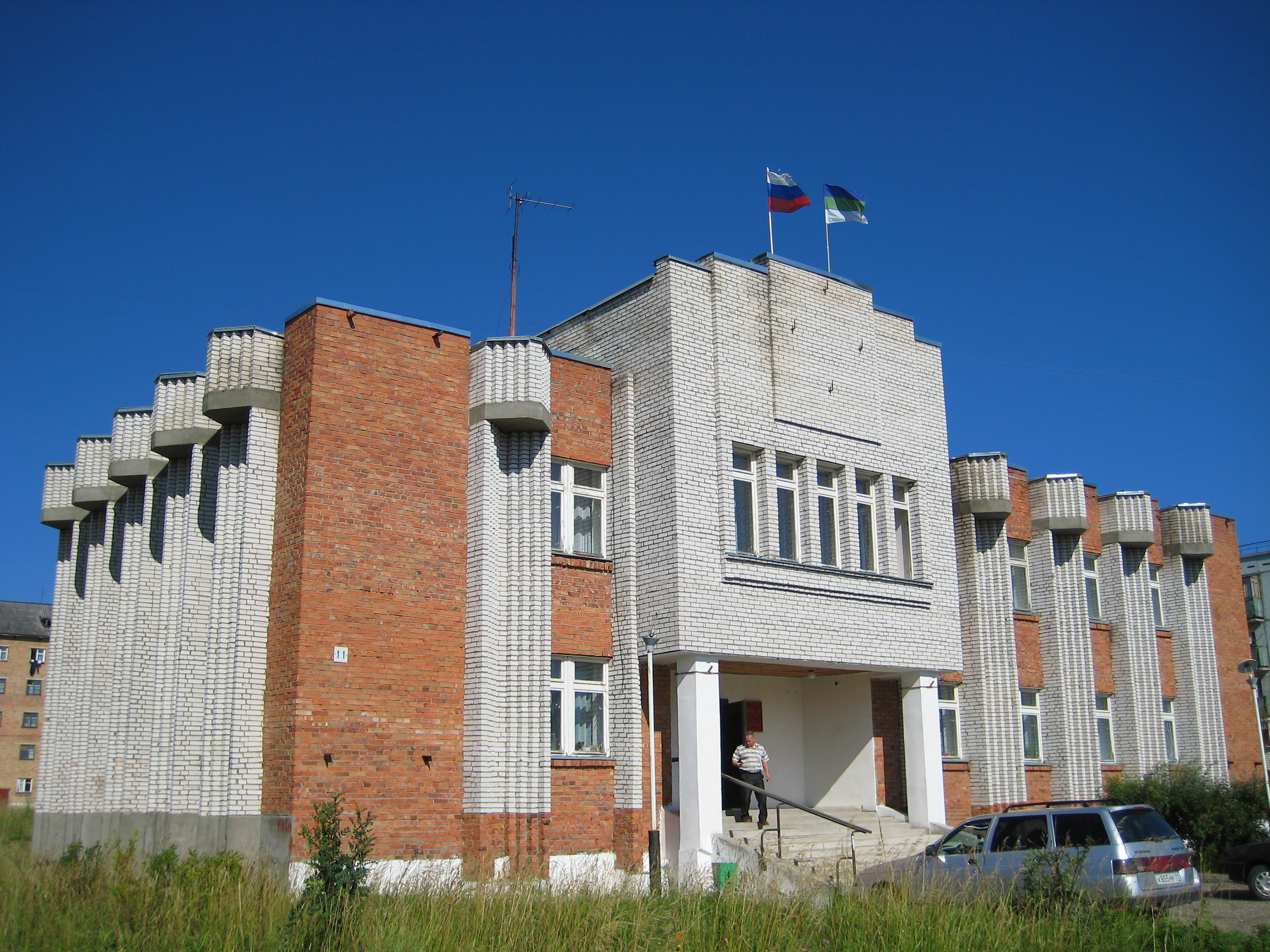
- Administration building in Zheshart

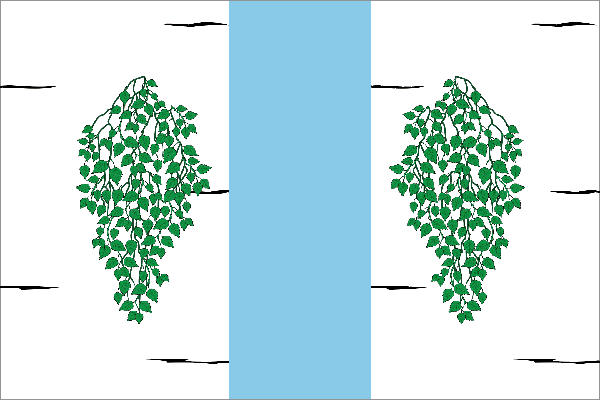
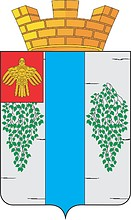
- Flag Coat of arms
- Interactive map of Zheshart
- Location of Zheshart Zheshart (Komi Republic)
- Coordinates: 62°05′N 49°35′E
- Country: Russia
- Federal subject: Komi Republic
- Administrative district: Ust-Vymsky District
- Urban-type settlement administrative territorySelsoviet: Zheshart Urban-Type Settlement Administrative Territory

Population (2010 Census)
  - Total: 8,561
  - Estimate (2024): 6,876 (−19.7%)

Administrative status
  - Capital of: Zheshart Urban-Type Settlement Administrative Territory

Municipal status
  - Municipal district: Ust-Vymsky Municipal District
  - Urban settlement: Zheshart Urban Settlement
  - Capital of: Zheshart Urban Settlement
- Time zone: UTC+3 (MSK)
- Postal codes: 169044, 169045
- OKTMO ID: 87644155051

Zheshart population
- 2010 Census: 8,561
- 2002 Census: 10,029
- 1989 Census: 12,674
- 1979 Census: 11,079

Zheshart (Russian: Же́шарт; Komi: Зӧвсьӧрт, Zövśört) is an urban locality (an urban-type settlement) in Ust-Vymsky District of the Komi Republic, Russia. As of the 2010 Census, its population was 8,561.

== Administrative and municipal status ==
Within the framework of administrative divisions, the urban-type settlement of Zheshart, together with one rural locality (the village of Rimya), is incorporated within Ust-Vymsky District as Zheshart Urban-Type Settlement Administrative Territory (an administrative division of the district). As a municipal division, Zheshart Urban-Type Settlement Administrative Territory is incorporated within Ust-Vymsky Municipal District as Zheshart Urban Settlement.

== Paleontology ==
Fossils of Early Triassic tetrapods were found near Zheshart. Two species of procolophonid Kapes, K. amaenus and K. komiensis (Macrophon komiensis), are known by skull fragments and part of upper jaw, respectively. Temnospondyl amphibians Parotosuchus komiensis, Trematosaurus sp. and Batrachosuchoides ochevi are known from the Upper Olenekian deposits of Zheshart.
