= Ust-Vymsky District =

Ust-Vymsky District Усть-Вымский район (Russian)
- District

Other transcription(s)
  - Komi: Емдін район
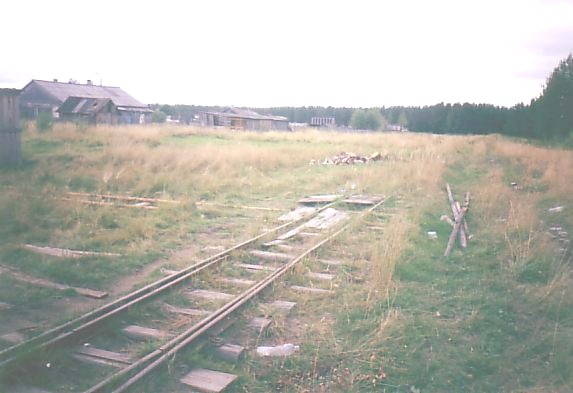
- The settlement of Donayol in Ust-Vymsky District

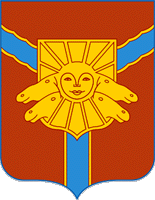
- Coat of arms
- Location of Ust-Vymsky District in the Komi Republic
- Coordinates: 62°14′N 50°00′E
- Country: Russia
- Federal subject: Komi Republic
- Established: 15 July 1929
- Administrative center: Aykino

Area
  - Total: 4,775 km^{2} (1,844 sq mi)

Population (2010 Census)
  - Total: 29,474
  - Density: 6.173/km^{2} (15.99/sq mi)
  - Urban: 65.5%
  - Rural: 34.5%

Administrative structure
  - Administrative divisions: 1 Town of district significance administrative territories, 1 Urban-type settlement administrative territories, 5 Selo administrative territories, 5 Settlement administrative territories
  - Inhabited localities: 1 cities/towns, 1 urban-type settlements, 51 rural localities

Municipal structure
  - Municipally incorporated as: Ust-Vymsky Municipal District
  - Municipal divisions: 2 urban settlements, 10 rural settlements
- Time zone: UTC+3 (MSK)
- OKTMO ID: 87644000
- Website: http://emdinmu.ru/

Population of Ust-Vymsky District
- 2010 Census: 29,474
- 2002 Census: 34,000
- 1989 Census: 43,236
- 1979 Census: 42,157

Ust-Vymsky District (Russian: Усть-Вы́мский райо́н; Komi: Емдін район, Jemdïn rajon) is an administrative district (raion), one of the twelve in the Komi Republic, Russia. It is located in the southwest of the republic. The area of the district is 4,775 square kilometers (1,844 sq mi). Its administrative center is the rural locality (a selo) of Aykino. As of the 2010 Census, the total population of the district was 29,474, with the population of Aykino accounting for 11.4% of that number.

== Administrative and municipal status ==
Within the framework of administrative divisions, Ust-Vymsky District is one of the twelve in the Komi Republic. It is divided into one town of district significance administrative territory (Mikun), one urban-type settlement administrative territory (Zheshart), five selo administrative territories, and five settlement administrative territories, all of which comprise fifty-one rural localities. As a municipal division, the district is incorporated as Ust-Vymsky Municipal District. Mikun Town of District Significance Administrative Territory and Zheshart Urban-Type Settlement Administrative Territory are incorporated into two urban settlements, and the ten remaining administrative territories are incorporated into ten rural settlements within the municipal district. The selo of Aykino serves as the administrative center of both the administrative and municipal district.

== See also ==
- Ustvymlag
