= Yemva =

Town in the Komi Republic, Russia

Yemva Емва
- Town

Other transcription(s)
  - Komi: Емва
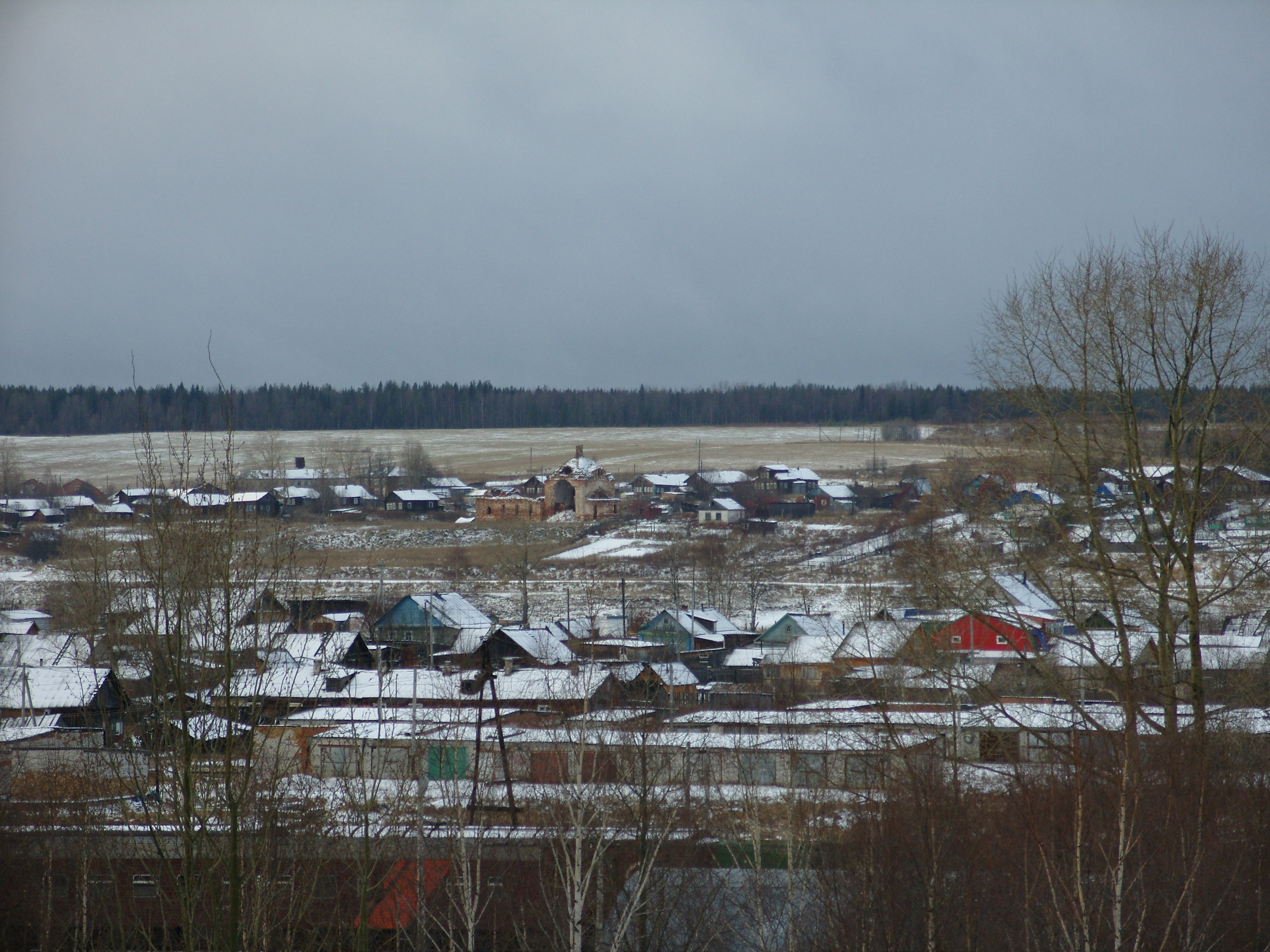
- View of Yemva

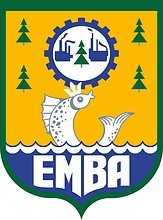
- Coat of arms
- Interactive map of Yemva
- Location of Yemva Yemva (Komi Republic)
- Coordinates: 62°36′N 50°52′E
- Country: Russia
- Federal subject: Komi Republic
- Administrative district: Knyazhpogostsky District
- Town of District Significance Administrative TerritorySelsoviet: Yemva
- Founded: 1930s
- Town status since: 1985

Population (2010 Census)
  - Total: 14,570
  - Estimate (2024): 10,620 (−27.1%)

Administrative status
  - Capital of: Knyazhpogostsky District, Yemva Town of District Significance Administrative Territory

Municipal status
  - Municipal district: Knyazhpogostsky Municipal District
  - Urban settlement: Yemva Urban Settlement
  - Capital of: Knyazhpogostsky Municipal District, Yemva Urban Settlement
- Time zone: UTC+3 (MSK)
- Postal code: 169200–169203
- OKTMO ID: 87608101001

Yemva (Russian: Е́мва; Komi: Емва, Jemva) is a town and the administrative center of Knyazhpogostsky District of the Komi Republic, Russia, located on the Vym River 130 kilometers (81 mi) northeast of Syktyvkar. Population: 14,570 (2010 census); 16,739 (2002 census); 18,782 (1989 Soviet census).

== History ==
It was founded as a settlement around the railway station of Knyazhpogost (Княжпого́ст). It was granted urban-type settlement status and renamed Zheleznodorozhny (Russian: Железнодоро́жный) in 1941. In 1985, it was granted town status and renamed Yemva, which is the local name for the Vym River.

== Administrative and municipal status ==
Within the framework of administrative divisions, Yemva serves as the administrative center of Knyazhpogostsky District. As an administrative division, it is, together with nine rural localities, incorporated within Knyazhpogostsky District as Yemva Town of District Significance Administrative Territory. As a municipal division, Yemva Town of District Significance Administrative Territory is incorporated within Knyazhpogostsky Municipal District as Yemva Urban Settlement.

== Sport ==
Yemva has a bandy club that plays in a recreational league.
