= Yarega =

Yarega Ярега
- Urban-type settlement

Other transcription(s)
  - Komi: Ярега
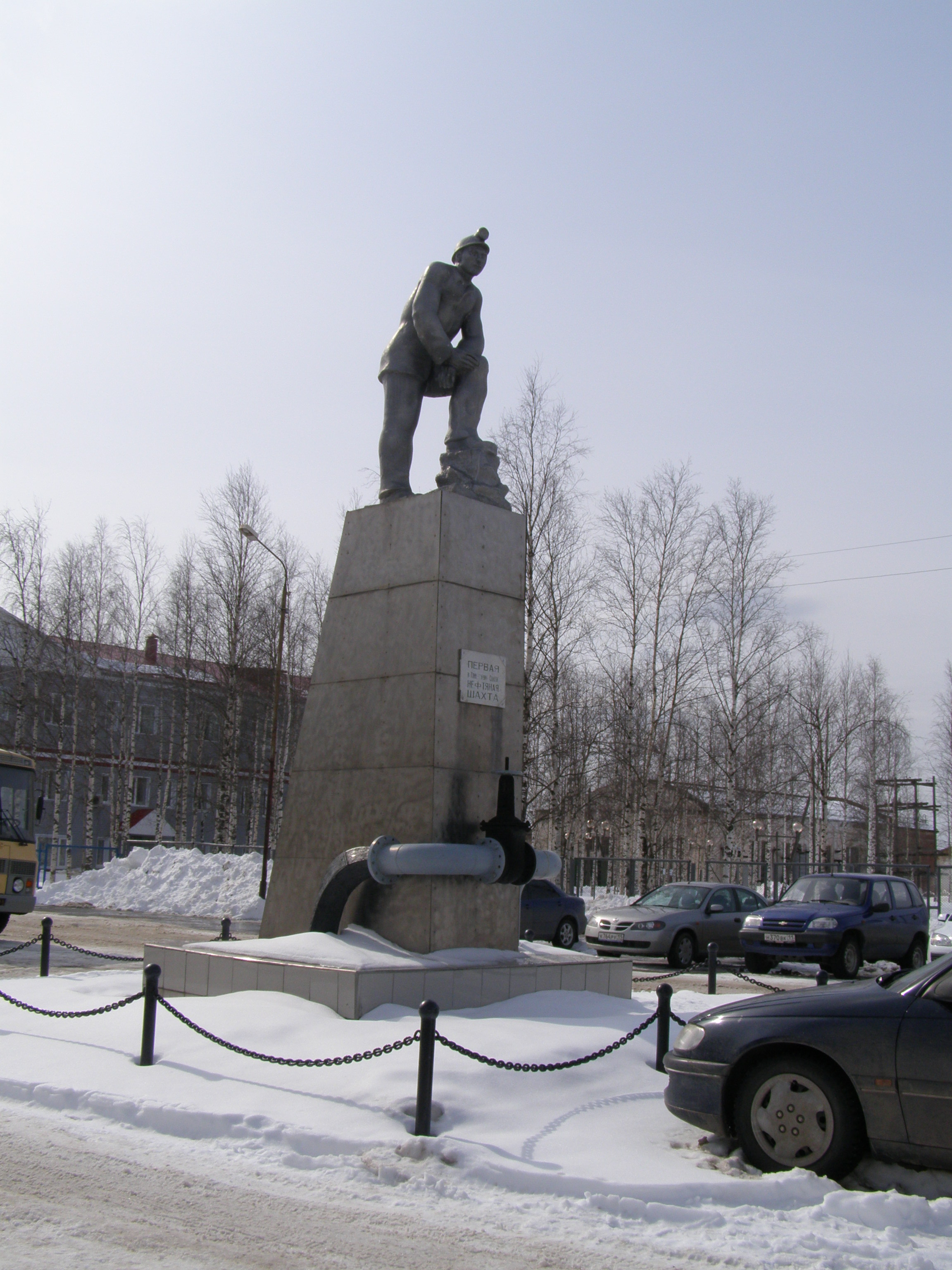
- The first oil mine in the USSR
- Interactive map of Yarega
- Location of Yarega Yarega (Komi Republic)
- Coordinates: 63°26′N 53°34′E
- Country: Russia
- Federal subject: Komi Republic
- Urban-type settlement administrative territorySelsoviet: Yarega Urban-Type Settlement Administrative Territory
- Founded: 1932

Population (2010 Census)
  - Total: 7,806
  - Estimate (2025): 6,076 (−22.2%)

Administrative status
  - Subordinated to: town of republic significance of Ukhta
  - Capital of: Yarega Urban-Type Settlement Administrative Territory

Municipal status
  - Urban okrug: Ukhta Urban Okrug
- Time zone: UTC+3 (MSK)
- Postal code: 169347
- OKTMO ID: 87725000071

Yarega population
- 2010 Census: 7,806
- 2002 Census: 8,512
- 1989 Census: 10,650
- 1979 Census: 9,054

Yarega (Russian: Я́рега; Komi: Ярега, Jarega) is an urban locality (an urban-type settlement) under the administrative jurisdiction of the town of republic significance of Ukhta in the Komi Republic, Russia. As of the 2010 Census, its population was 7,806.

== Administrative and municipal status ==
Within the framework of administrative divisions, the urban-type settlement of Yarega, together with two rural localities, is incorporated as Yarega Urban-Type Settlement Administrative Territory, which is subordinated to the town of republic significance of Ukhta. Within the framework of municipal divisions, Yarega is a part of Ukhta Urban Okrug.
