= Vodny, Komi Republic =

Vodny Водный
- Urban-type settlement

Other transcription(s)
  - Komi: Воднӧй
- Interactive map of Vodny
- Location of Vodny Vodny (Komi Republic)
- Coordinates: 63°30′N 53°25′E
- Country: Russia
- Federal subject: Komi Republic
- Urban-type settlement administrative territorySelsoviet: Vodny Urban-Type Settlement Administrative Territory
- Urban-type settlement status since: 1944

Population (2010 Census)
  - Total: 6,382
  - Estimate (2025): 4,484 (−29.7%)

Administrative status
  - Subordinated to: town of republic significance of Ukhta
  - Capital of: Vodny Urban-Type Settlement Administrative Territory

Municipal status
  - Urban okrug: Ukhta Urban Okrug
- Time zone: UTC+3 (MSK)
- Postal code: 169336
- OKTMO ID: 87725000061

Vodny population
- 2010 Census: 6,382
- 2002 Census: 6,634
- 1989 Census: 8,015
- 1979 Census: 6,980

Vodny (Russian: Водный; Komi: Воднӧй, Vodnöj) is an urban locality (an urban-type settlement) under the administrative jurisdiction of the town of republic significance of Ukhta in the Komi Republic, Russia. As of the 2010 Census, its population was 6,382.

== History ==
Urban-type settlement status was granted to Vodny in 1944.

== Administrative and municipal status ==
Within the framework of administrative divisions, the urban-type settlement of Vodny, together with two rural localities, is incorporated as Vodny Urban-Type Settlement Administrative Territory, which is subordinated to the town of republic significance of Ukhta. Within the framework of municipal divisions, Vodny is a part of Ukhta Urban Okrug.
