= Lake Novozero =

Lake in Vologda, Russia

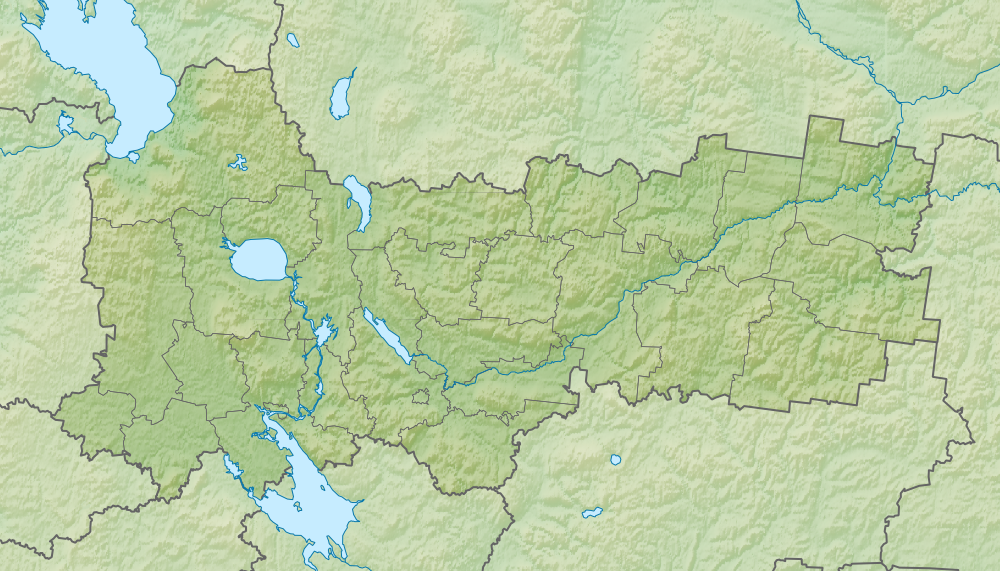
- Location within Vologda Oblast
- Location: Vologda Oblast
- Coordinates: 59°57′N 37°15′E
- Catchment area: 130 square kilometres (50 mi^{2})
- Basin countries: Russia
- Surface area: 12.3 square kilometres (4.7 mi^{2})
- Islands: Ognenny Ostrov

Lake Novozero (Ozero Novozero, Russian: озеро Новозеро), is a lake in Belozersky District in Vologda Oblast, Russia. The lake has the island Ognenny Ostrov which now holds a high-security penal institution.
