= Mezhdurechensk, Komi Republic =

Mezhdurechensk Междуреченск
- Urban-type settlement

Other transcription(s)
  - Komi: Междуреченск
- Interactive map of Mezhdurechensk
- Location of Mezhdurechensk Mezhdurechensk (Komi Republic)
- Coordinates: 63°13′05″N 48°33′51″E
- Country: Russia
- Federal subject: Komi Republic
- Administrative district: Udorsky District
- Urban-type settlement administrative territorySelsoviet: Mezhdurechensk Urban-Type Settlement Administrative Territory

Population (2010 Census)
  - Total: 1,418
  - Estimate (2025): 963 (−32.1%)

Administrative status
  - Capital of: Mezhdurechensk Urban-Type Settlement Administrative Territory

Municipal status
  - Municipal district: Udorsky Municipal District
  - Urban settlement: Mezhdurechensk Urban Settlement
  - Capital of: Mezhdurechensk Urban Settlement
- Time zone: UTC+3 (MSK)
- Postal code: 169260
- OKTMO ID: 87640153051

Mezhdurechensk population
- 2010 Census: 1,418
- 2002 Census: 1,951
- 1989 Census: 3,273
- 1979 Census: 3,030

Mezhdurechensk (Russian: Междуре́ченск; Komi: Междуреченск) is an urban locality (an urban-type settlement) in Udorsky District of the Komi Republic, Russia. As of the 2010 Census, its population was 1,418.

== Administrative and municipal status ==
Within the framework of administrative divisions, the urban-type settlement of Mezhdurechensk, together with one rural locality (the settlement of Selegvozh), is incorporated within Udorsky District as Mezhdurechensk Urban-Type Settlement Administrative Territory (an administrative division of the district). As a municipal division, Mezhdurechensk Urban-Type Settlement Administrative Territory is incorporated within Udorsky Municipal District as Mezhdurechensk Urban Settlement.
