= Blagoyevo =

Blagoyevo Благоево
- Urban-type settlement

Other transcription(s)
  - Komi: Благоев
- Interactive map of Blagoyevo
- Location of Blagoyevo Blagoyevo (Komi Republic)
- Coordinates: 63°26′N 47°57′E
- Country: Russia
- Federal subject: Komi Republic
- Administrative district: Udorsky District
- Urban-type settlement administrative territorySelsoviet: Blagoyevo Urban-Type Settlement Administrative Territory
- Founded: 1968
- Elevation: 105 m (344 ft)

Population (2010 Census)
  - Total: 2,221
  - Estimate (2025): 1,832 (−17.5%)

Administrative status
  - Capital of: Blagoyevo Urban-Type Settlement Administrative Territory

Municipal status
  - Municipal district: Udorsky Municipal District
  - Urban settlement: Blagoyevo Urban Settlement
  - Capital of: Blagoyevo Urban Settlement
- Time zone: UTC+3 (MSK)
- Postal code: 169250
- OKTMO ID: 87640152051

Blagoyevo population
- 2010 Census: 2,221
- 2002 Census: 2,640
- 1989 Census: 4,695
- 1979 Census: 5,033

Blagoyevo (Russian: Благоево; Komi: Благоев, Blagojev) is an urban locality (an urban-type settlement) in Udorsky District of the Komi Republic, Russia. As of the 2010 Census, its population was 2,221.

== Administrative and municipal status ==
Within the framework of administrative divisions, the urban-type settlement of Blagoyevo, together with four rural localities, is incorporated within Udorsky District as Blagoyevo Urban-Type Settlement Administrative Territory (an administrative division of the district). As a municipal division, Blagoyevo Urban-Type Settlement Administrative Territory is incorporated within Udorsky Municipal District as Blagoyevo Urban Settlement.
