= Izhma (river) =

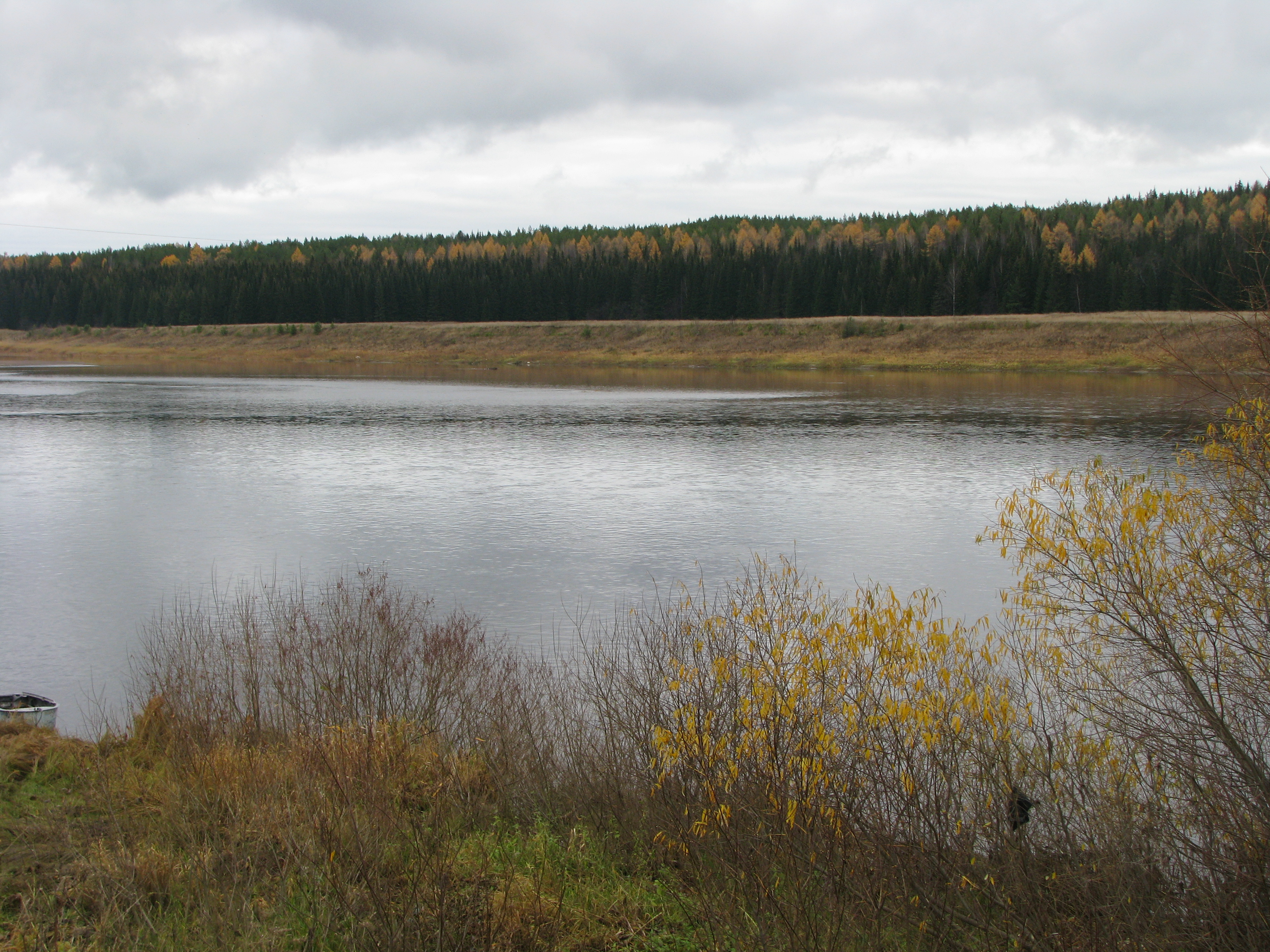
- The Izhma near Ust-Ukhta

Location
- Country: Russia

Physical characteristics
- Source
  - location: Timan Ridge
- Mouth: Pechora
  - coordinates: 65°19′24″N 52°54′28″E
- Length: 531 km (330 mi)
- Basin size: 31,000 km^{2} (12,000 sq mi)
- Discharge
  - average: 203 m^{3}/s (7,200 cu ft/s) (154 km from the mouth)

Basin features
- Progression: Pechora→ Barents Sea

The Izhma (Russian: И́жма) is a river in the Komi Republic of Russia. It is a left tributary of the Pechora. It is 531 kilometres (330 mi) long, with a drainage basin of 31,000 square kilometres (12,000 mi^{2}). At a point 154 kilometres (96 mi) from its mouth, it has an average discharge of 203 cubic metres per second (7,200 cu ft/s). The river freezes over in November, and stays icebound until the spring thaw starts in May.

Main tributaries are the Ukhta, Ayuva and Sebys.

The Izhma has its sources in the Timan Ridge. In its upper course the banks are wooded, while its lower parts is characterized by meadows and bogs. The river is twisting, and in its upper reaches it forms rapids and rocky stretches. At its confluence with the Ukhta lies the town of Sosnogorsk.

The Izhma is navigable to its confluence with the Ukhta. In its lower parts the river widens, its flow slows down and it starts forming meanders and small islands. It flows into the Pechora at Ust-Izhma.
