= Sosnogorsk =

Town in the Komi Republic, Russia

Sosnogorsk Сосногорск
- Town

Other transcription(s)
  - Komi: Сӧснагорт
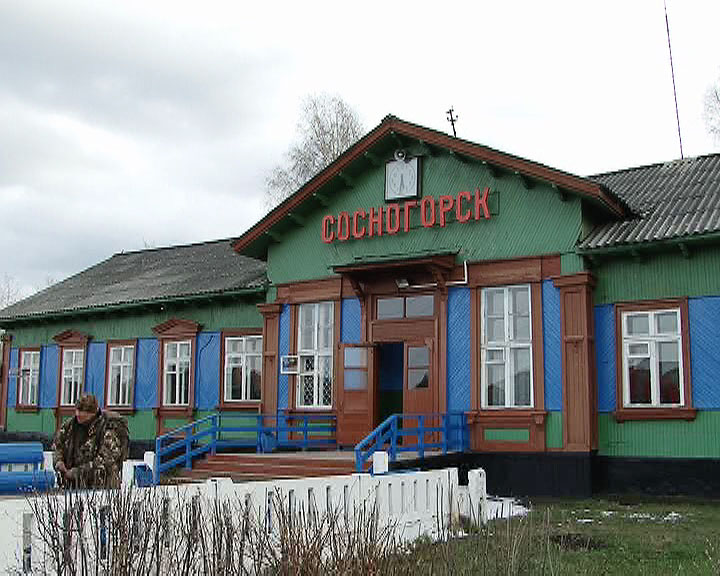
- Sosnogorsk railway station

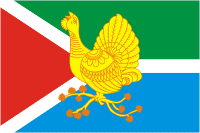
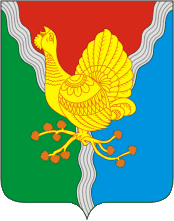
- Flag Coat of arms
- Interactive map of Sosnogorsk
- Location of Sosnogorsk Sosnogorsk (Komi Republic)
- Coordinates: 63°36′N 53°54′E
- Country: Russia
- Federal subject: Komi Republic
- Founded: 1939

Government
  - Head: Natalya Kupetskova

Population (2010 Census)
  - Total: 27,757
  - Estimate (2024): 21,850 (−21.3%)

Administrative status
  - Subordinated to: town of republic significance of Sosnogorsk
  - Capital of: town of republic significance of Sosnogorsk

Municipal status
  - Municipal district: Sosnogorsk Municipal District
  - Urban settlement: Sosnogorsk Urban Settlement
  - Capital of: Sosnogorsk Municipal District, Sosnogorsk Urban Settlement
- Time zone: UTC+3 (MSK)
- Postal codes: 169500–169502, 169509
- Dialing code: +7 82149
- OKTMO ID: 87626122001
- Website: web.archive.org/web/20090604053058/http://www.sosnogorsk.org/

Sosnogorsk (Russian: Сосного́рск; Komi: Сӧснагорт, Sösnagort) is a town in the Komi Republic, Russia, located on the Izhma River. Population: 27,757 (2010 census); 29,587 (2002 census); 30,439 (1989 Soviet census).

== History ==
The settlement was first established in 1939 as a railway station. It was known as Izhma (Ижма) until 1957. During the Soviet era, a corrective labor camp was located here. Gas giant Gazprom has a natural-gas condensate factory in the town.

== Administrative and municipal status ==
Within the framework of administrative divisions, the town of Sosnogorsk is, together with two urban-type settlement administrative territories (comprising the urban-type settlements of Voyvozh and Nizhny Odes and three rural localities) and thirteen rural localities, incorporated as the town of republic significance of Sosnogorsk—an administrative unit with the status equal to that of the districts. As a municipal division, the town of republic significance of Sosnogorsk is incorporated as Sosnogorsk Municipal District; the town of Sosnogorsk and thirteen rural localities are incorporated within it as Sosnogorsk Urban Settlement. The two urban-type settlement administrative territories are incorporated into two urban settlements within the municipal district.
