= Ukhta =

Town in the Komi Republic, Russia

Ukhta Ухта
- Town

Other transcription(s)
  - Komi: Уква
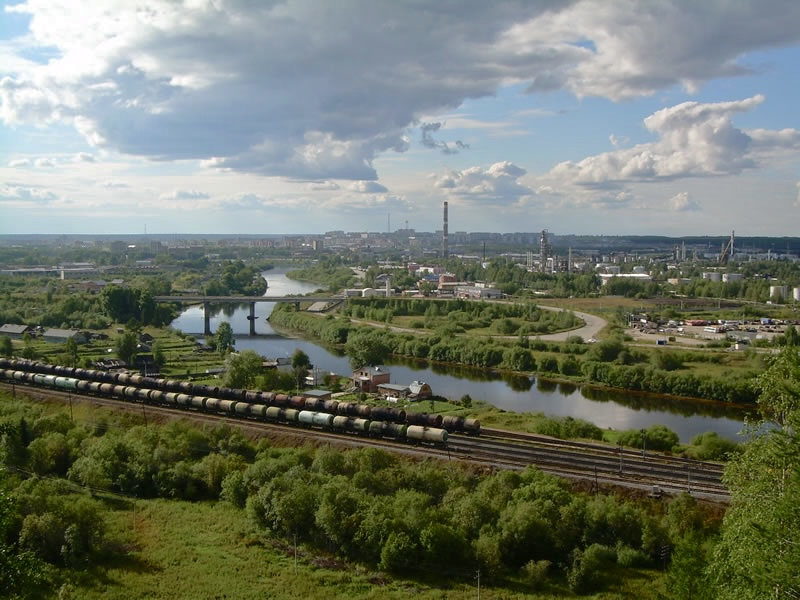
- View of Ukhta from Vetlosyan

- Coat of arms
- Interactive map of Ukhta
- Location of Ukhta Ukhta (Komi Republic)
- Coordinates: 63°34′N 53°42′E
- Country: Russia
- Federal subject: Komi Republic
- Founded: 1929
- Town status since: 1943

Government
  - Mayor: Grigory Konenkov
- Elevation: 100 m (330 ft)

Population (2010 Census)
  - Total: 99,591
  - Estimate (2025): 77,164 (−22.5%)
  - Rank: 166th in 2010

Administrative status
  - Subordinated to: town of republic significance of Ukhta
  - Capital of: town of republic significance of Ukhta

Municipal status
  - Urban okrug: Ukhta Urban Okrug
  - Capital of: Ukhta Urban Okrug
- Time zone: UTC+3 (MSK)
- Postal code: 169300
- Dialing code: +7 8216
- OKTMO ID: 87725000001
- Website: mouhta.ru

Ukhta (Russian: Ухта́; Komi: Уква, Ukva) is an important industrial town and the second-largest city in the Komi Republic of Russia. Population: 97,899 (2021 census); 99,591 (2010 census); 103,340 (2002 census); 110,548 (1989 Soviet census).

It was known as Chibyu until 1939.

== History ==
Oil springs along the Ukhta River were already known in the 17th century. In the mid-19th century, industrialist M. K. Sidorov started to drill for oil in this area. It was one of the first oil wells in Russia. There was homecraft oil field in 1920–1921 in Ukhta. Lying on the river of the same name, the settlement was founded as the village of Chibyu in 1929, but in 1939 it was renamed Ukhta. It was granted town status in 1943 when it was linked to the Pechora Railway. To the east of the town is Sosnogorsk, and to the southwest Yarega. In addition to the rail link, there is Ukhta Airport.

The town expanded in the 1940s and 1950s by use of political prisoners' forced labor (see: gulag).

== Administrative and municipal status ==
Within the framework of administrative divisions, it is, together with four urban-type settlements (Borovoy, Vodny, Shudayag, and Yarega) and thirteen rural localities, incorporated as the town of republic significance of Ukhta—an administrative unit with the status equal to that of the districts. As a municipal division, the town of republic significance of Ukhta is incorporated as Ukhta Urban Okrug.

== Economy ==
Ukhta lies within the Timan-Pechora Basin, an important oil and gas-producing region. The oilfields lie just south of the city. Some of the Ukhta's oil is refined locally; most is piped to oil refineries between St. Petersburg and Moscow. There have been a few gas pipeline explosions eight kilometres (five miles) from the town since the 1990s.

== Climate ==
Ukhta has a continental subarctic climate (Dfc) with long, very cold winters and short, warm summers. Compared with areas at a similar latitude in Siberia, winters are less extreme, but still much longer than summer and bitterly cold by European standards.

Climate data for Ukhta
Month	Jan	Feb	Mar	Apr	May	Jun	Jul	Aug	Sep	Oct	Nov	Dec	Year
Record high °C (°F)	2.5 (36.5)	3.0 (37.4)	13.0 (55.4)	23.8 (74.8)	30.1 (86.2)	33.5 (92.3)	35.2 (95.4)	32.5 (90.5)	27.4 (81.3)	20.0 (68.0)	8.2 (46.8)	3.6 (38.5)	35.2 (95.4)
Mean daily maximum °C (°F)	−13.1 (8.4)	−10.9 (12.4)	−2.4 (27.7)	4.6 (40.3)	12.0 (53.6)	19.0 (66.2)	22.1 (71.8)	17.3 (63.1)	10.7 (51.3)	2.8 (37.0)	−6.0 (21.2)	−10.6 (12.9)	3.8 (38.8)
Daily mean °C (°F)	−16.5 (2.3)	−14.7 (5.5)	−6.8 (19.8)	−0.5 (31.1)	6.3 (43.3)	13.3 (55.9)	16.5 (61.7)	12.4 (54.3)	6.9 (44.4)	0.4 (32.7)	−8.9 (16.0)	−13.8 (7.2)	−0.5 (31.1)
Mean daily minimum °C (°F)	−20.0 (−4.0)	−18.1 (−0.6)	−10.9 (12.4)	−5.0 (23.0)	1.5 (34.7)	8.2 (46.8)	11.6 (52.9)	8.4 (47.1)	4.0 (39.2)	−1.8 (28.8)	−11.3 (11.7)	−17.2 (1.0)	−4.2 (24.4)
Record low °C (°F)	−48.5 (−55.3)	−43.9 (−47.0)	−39.2 (−38.6)	−28.4 (−19.1)	−16.9 (1.6)	−4.2 (24.4)	−0.4 (31.3)	−3.9 (25.0)	−8.8 (16.2)	−26.4 (−15.5)	−37.8 (−36.0)	−49.0 (−56.2)	−49.0 (−56.2)
Average precipitation mm (inches)	32 (1.3)	26 (1.0)	29 (1.1)	28 (1.1)	44 (1.7)	66 (2.6)	71 (2.8)	69 (2.7)	54 (2.1)	55 (2.2)	40 (1.6)	39 (1.5)	553 (21.8)
Source: Weatherbase

Historical population
Year	Pop.	±%
1939	2,700	—
1959	36,154	+1239.0%
1970	62,923	+74.0%
1979	87,467	+39.0%
1989	110,548	+26.4%
2002	103,340	−6.5%
2010	99,591	−3.6%
2021	79,899	−19.8%
Source: Census data

== Notable people ==
- Roman Abramovich, Russian businessman
- Dmitri Aliev, Olympic figure skater
- Aleksandr Chupriyan, Minister of Emergency Situations
- Olga Fonda, actress
- Sergei Kapustin (1953–1995), hockey player
- Viktor Alexandrovič Lyapkalo, painter
- Eduard Rossel, Governor of Sverdlovsk Oblast
- Yulia Samoilova, Russian singer
- Alexander Sukhorukov, Olympic swimmer
- Arsen Pavlov (1983–2016), former commander of Donetsk Separatist militia "Sparta Battalion"
