= Mikun =

Town in the Komi Republic, Russia

Mikun Микунь
- Town

Other transcription(s)
  - Komi: Микунь
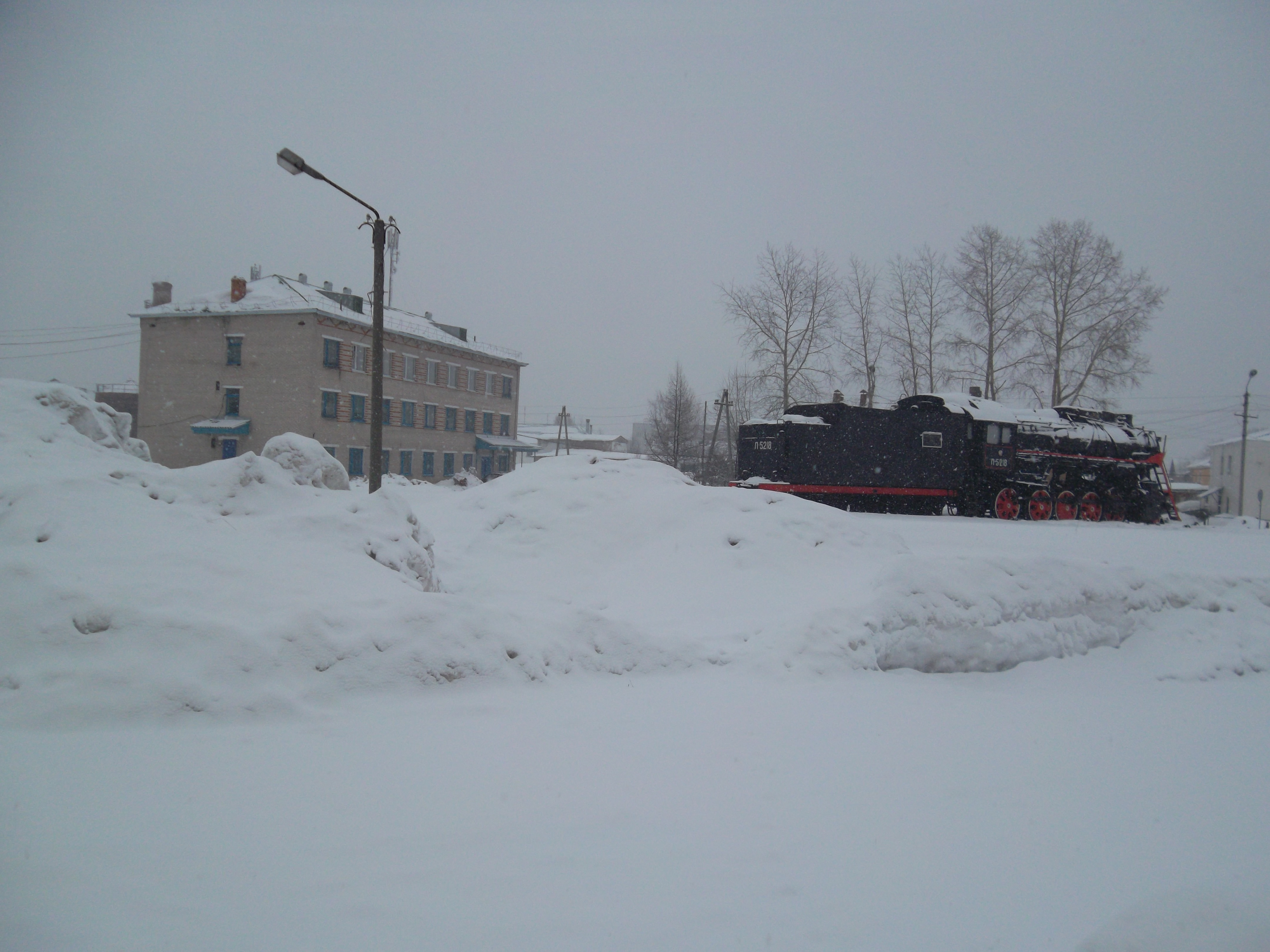
- A train in Mikun
- Interactive map of Mikun
- Location of Mikun Mikun (Komi Republic)
- Coordinates: 62°22′N 50°05′E
- Country: Russia
- Federal subject: Komi Republic
- Administrative district: Ust-Vymsky District
- Town of District Significance Administrative TerritorySelsoviet: Mikun
- Founded: 1937
- Town status since: 1959

Population (2010 Census)
  - Total: 10,730
  - Estimate (2024): 8,288 (−22.8%)

Administrative status
  - Capital of: Mikun Town of District Significance Administrative Territory

Municipal status
  - Municipal district: Ust-Vymsky Municipal District
  - Urban settlement: Mikun Urban Settlement
  - Capital of: Mikun Urban Settlement
- Time zone: UTC+3 (MSK)
- Postal codes: 169060, 169061
- OKTMO ID: 87644105001

Mikun (Russian: Ми́кунь; Komi: Микунь, Mikuń) is a town in Ust-Vymsky District of the Komi Republic, Russia, located 96 kilometers (60 mi) north of Syktyvkar. Population: 10,730 (2010 census); 11,680 (2002 census); 12,507 (1989 Soviet census).

== History ==
It was founded in 1937 as a gulag settlement. Town status was granted to it in 1959.

== Administrative and municipal status ==
Within the framework of administrative divisions, it is, together with the settlement of Shezham, incorporated within Ust-Vymsky District as Mikun Town of District Significance Administrative Territory. As a municipal division, Mikun Town of District Significance Administrative Territory is incorporated within Ust-Vymsky Municipal District as Mikun Urban Settlement.
