= Kozhim =

Kozhim Russian: Ко́жим
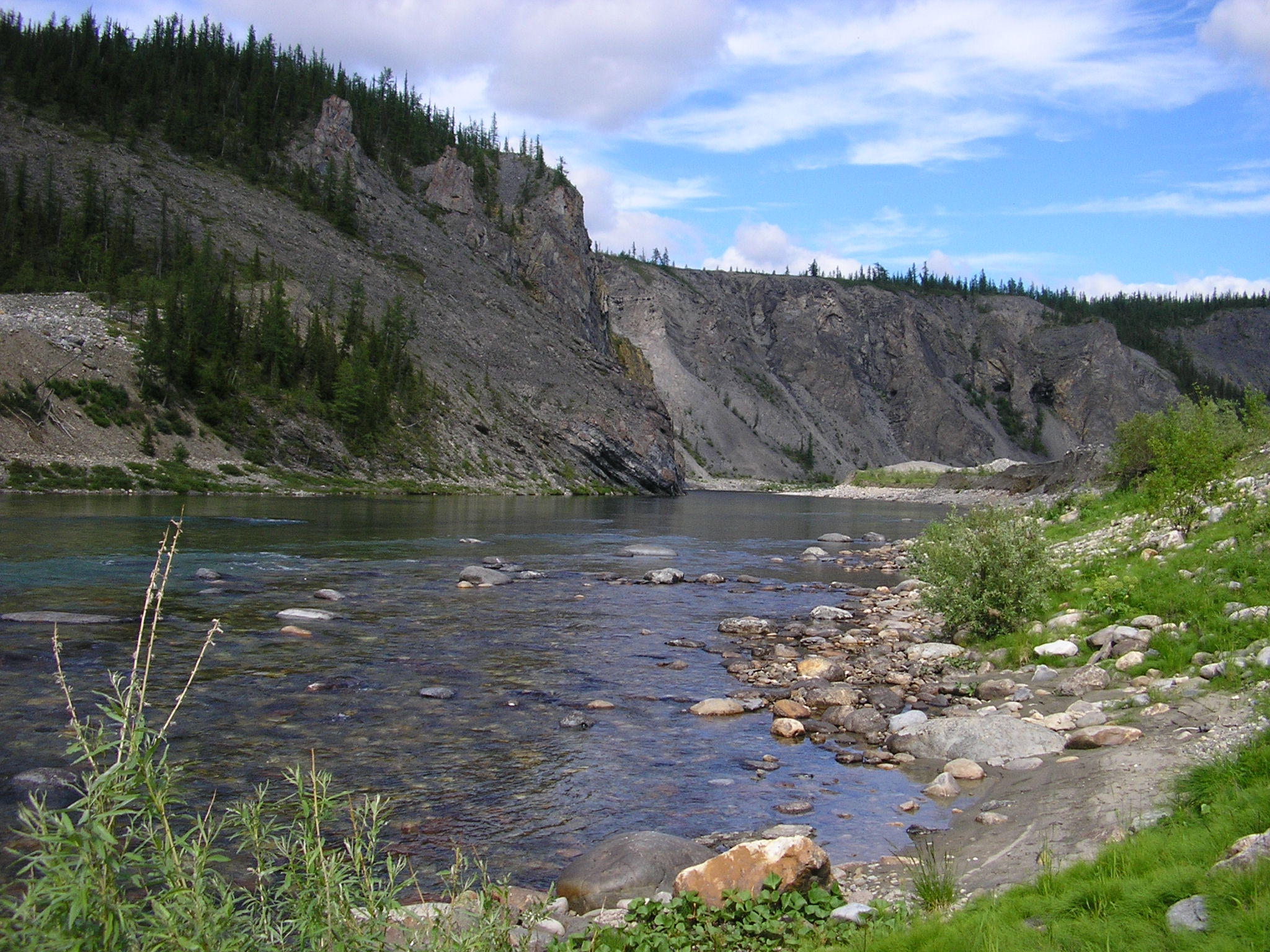
- The Kozhim in Yugyd Va National Park

- The Kozhim in the Pechora basin

Location
- Country: Russia
- State: Komi Republic

Physical characteristics
- Source: Ural Mountains
  - location: Russia
  - coordinates: 64°55′48″N 60°40′07″E
- Mouth: Kosyu
  - coordinates: 65°47′35″N 59°18′10″E
- Length: 202 km (126 mi)
- Basin size: 5,180 km^{2} (2,000 sq mi)
- Discharge
  - location: mouth (monthly average)

Basin features
- Progression: Kosyu→ Usa→ Pechora→ Barents Sea

The Kozhim is a river in Komi Republic, Russia that runs through the subpolar Ural Mountains. It is a tributary of the Kosyu, which is a tributary of the Usa. It is 202 kilometres (126 mi) long, and has a drainage basin of 5,180 square kilometres (2,000 sq mi).

== See also ==
- List of rivers of Russia
