= Ust-Shchuger =

Rural locality in the Komi Republic

Ust-Shchuger Усть-Щугер
- Interactive map of Ust-Shchuger
- Location of Ust-Shchuger Ust-Shchuger (Komi Republic)
- Coordinates: 64°16′N 57°37′E
- Country: Russia
- Federal subject: Komi Republic
- Elevation: 85 m (279 ft)

Population
  - Estimate (2021): 13 )
- Time zone: UTC+3 (MSK)
- Postal code: 1695829
- OKTMO ID: 87712000151

Ust-Shchuger (Russian: Усть-Щугер, Komi: Тшугӧр, Čugör), formerly known as Ust-Shchugor (Усть-Щугор), is a rural locality (a village) in the Komi Republic, Russia, located at an elevation of 85 meters (279 ft) near the confluence of the Pechora and Shchuger Rivers. The Shchugor River was once a minor route into Siberia. From its headwaters one could cross the Ural Mountains to reach the Severnaya Sosva River thereby allowing travel from the Pechora River to the Ob River.

== Climate ==
Ust-Shchuger has a subarctic climate (Dfc) with mild to warm summers and severely cold winters. It holds the European low temperature record of −58.1 °C (−72.6 °F), recorded on December 31, 1978. In spite of this, winter averages are less severe than areas on similar and lower latitudes further east across the Siberian boundary. Winters are very snowy due to a humid influence, causing a vast snow pack that lasts well into spring.

Climate data for Ust-Shchuger (Climate ID:23518)
| Month | Jan | Feb | Mar | Apr | May | Jun | Jul | Aug | Sep | Oct | Nov | Dec | Year |
|---|---|---|---|---|---|---|---|---|---|---|---|---|---|
| Record high °C (°F) | 0.8 (33.4) | 2.5 (36.5) | 11.1 (52.0) | 18.9 (66.0) | 29.3 (84.7) | 33.5 (92.3) | 34.2 (93.6) | 32.2 (90.0) | 26.3 (79.3) | 19.0 (66.2) | 5.0 (41.0) | 2.2 (36.0) | 34.2 (93.6) |
| Mean daily maximum °C (°F) | −14.6 (5.7) | −10.2 (13.6) | −2.5 (27.5) | 2.2 (36.0) | 9.0 (48.2) | 19.4 (66.9) | 22.0 (71.6) | 17.1 (62.8) | 10.1 (50.2) | 1.5 (34.7) | −7.2 (19.0) | −12.2 (10.0) | 2.9 (37.2) |
| Daily mean °C (°F) | −18.5 (−1.3) | −14.1 (6.6) | −9.2 (15.4) | −3.5 (25.7) | 4.4 (39.9) | 13.2 (55.8) | 16.8 (62.2) | 11.8 (53.2) | 6.2 (43.2) | −0.5 (31.1) | −9.2 (15.4) | −14.1 (6.6) | −1.4 (29.5) |
| Mean daily minimum °C (°F) | −23.5 (−10.3) | −22.4 (−8.3) | −14.5 (5.9) | −10.0 (14.0) | −1.3 (29.7) | 6.2 (43.2) | 10.3 (50.5) | 6.0 (42.8) | 2.2 (36.0) | −3.5 (25.7) | −16.2 (2.8) | −21.1 (−6.0) | −7.3 (18.8) |
| Record low °C (°F) | −50 (−58) | −48 (−54) | −45 (−49) | −29.2 (−20.6) | −24 (−11) | −5.1 (22.8) | −1.3 (29.7) | −5.1 (22.8) | −9.2 (15.4) | −27.5 (−17.5) | −43.9 (−47.0) | −58.1 (−72.6) | −58.1 (−72.6) |
| Average precipitation mm (inches) | 45.6 (1.80) | 34.3 (1.35) | 25.8 (1.02) | 35.8 (1.41) | 47.9 (1.89) | 73.5 (2.89) | 76.8 (3.02) | 79.5 (3.13) | 59.1 (2.33) | 71.4 (2.81) | 53.9 (2.12) | 57.0 (2.24) | 660.6 (26.01) |
| Average precipitation days (≥ 1 mm) | 12.6 | 11.8 | 13.8 | 11.3 | 18.9 | 15.8 | 15.6 | 19.7 | 19.7 | 21.1 | 15.6 | 11.7 | 187.6 |
Source 1: Météo climat stats
Source 2: Météo Climat

== Sources ==
- Государственный Совет Республики Коми. Закон №13-РЗ от 6 марта 2006 г. «Об административно-территориальном устройстве Республики Коми», в ред. Закона №171-РЗ от 26 декабря 2014 г. «Об упразднении населённого пункта Верхняя Седка, расположенного на территории Прилузского района Республики Коми, и внесении в связи с этим изменений в некоторые Законы Республики Коми». Вступил в силу со дня официального опубликования. Опубликован: "Республика", №44, 16 марта 2006 г. (State Council of the Komi Republic. Law #13-RZ of March 6, 2006 On the Administrative-Territorial Structure of the Komi Republic, as amended by the Law #171-RZ of December 26, 2014 On Abolishing the Inhabited Locality of Verkhnyaya Sedka Located on the Territory of Priluzsky District of the Komi Republic, and on Amending Various Laws of the Komi Republic Accordingly. Effective as of the official publication date.).
