= Adzva =

Physical characteristics
- Mouth: Usa
  - coordinates: 66.5894°N 59.3736°E
- Length: 334 km (208 mi)
- Basin size: 10,600 km^{2} (4,100 sq mi)

Basin features
- Progression: Usa→ Pechora→ Barents Sea

The Adzva (Russian: Адзьва) is a river in Komi Republic, Russia. It is a right tributary of the Usa. It is 334 kilometres (208 mi) long, and has a drainage basin of 10,600 square kilometres (4,100 sq mi).
