= Kolva =

Kolva is a name of several rivers in Russia:

- Kolva (Perm Krai), a tributary of the Vishera in Perm Krai
- Kolva (Usa), a tributary of the Usa in the Nenets Autonomous Okrug and the Komi Republic
