= Bolshaya Synya =

River in Siberia, Russia

Bolshaya Synya Большая Сыня / Ыджыд Сыняю
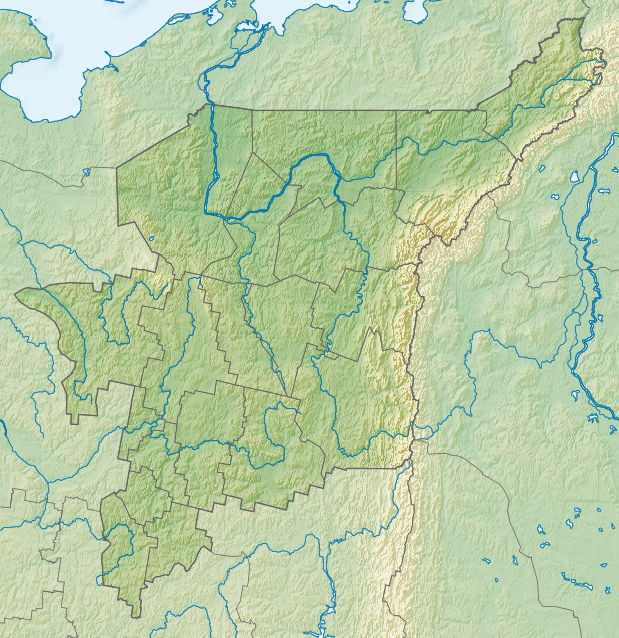
- Mouth location in the Komi Republic, Russia

Location
- Country: Russia

Physical characteristics
- Source: Subpolar Urals
  - coordinates: 64°46′42″N 59°06′19″E
  - elevation: ca 670 m (2,200 ft)
- Mouth: Usa
  - coordinates: 65°58′24″N 58°01′17″E
  - elevation: 33 m (108 ft)
- Length: 206 km (128 mi) (249 km (155 mi))
- Basin size: 4,040 km^{2} (1,560 sq mi)

Basin features
- Progression: Usa → Pechora→ Barents Sea

The Bolshaya Synya (Russian: Большая Сыня; Komi: Ыджыд Сыняю), also known simply as Synya, is a river in the Komi Republic, Russia. The river is 206 kilometres (128 mi) long —249 km (155 mi) from the source of the Voyvozh-Synya at its head— and has a catchment area of 4,040 square kilometres (1,560 sq mi). The Synya Formation, a Middle Triassic geological formation, is named after the Bolshaya Synya river.

The Synya flows across the Pechora Municipal District. The Pechora Railway crosses the river near Synya village. Part of the river basin falls within the limits of the Yugyd Va National Park, a protected area.

== Course ==
The Synya is a left tributary of the Usa, one of the main tributaries of the Pechora. It has its sources in the western slopes of the Subpolar Urals. The river heads in a roughly NNW direction as a mountain river in its upper reaches. In its middle and lower course its channel divides into branches as it flows within a wooded, swampy plain. In its last stretch there are many lakes in the plain to the west of the river. Finally the Bolshaya Synya meets the left bank of the Usa about 55 km (34 mi) from its mouth.

=== Tributaries ===
The main tributary of the Synya is the 97 km (60 mi) long Malaya Synya (Малая Сыня) from the right. The river is frozen between October and May.

== See also ==
- List of rivers of Russia
