= Lemva =

Coordinates: 66°30′14″N 61°59′28″E

- Location of the river Lemva

Lemva (Russian: Лемва?) is a river in the north of European Russia. It flows in the administrative district of the city of Inta in the Komi Republic.

The river rises from the confluence of its two main tributaries, the Malaya Lemva and the Bol'šaya Lemva, on the western slopes of the Subpolar Urals, near the border with the Khanty-Mansi Autonomous Okrug. It debouches into the Usa

== Tributaries ==
The main tributaries are:

- Junjacha (153 km long)
- Paga (108 km)
- Charuta (84 km)

These come from the right hydrographic line.
