= Northern river reversal =

Soviet Union project to divert the water resources of northern Siberia to Central Asia

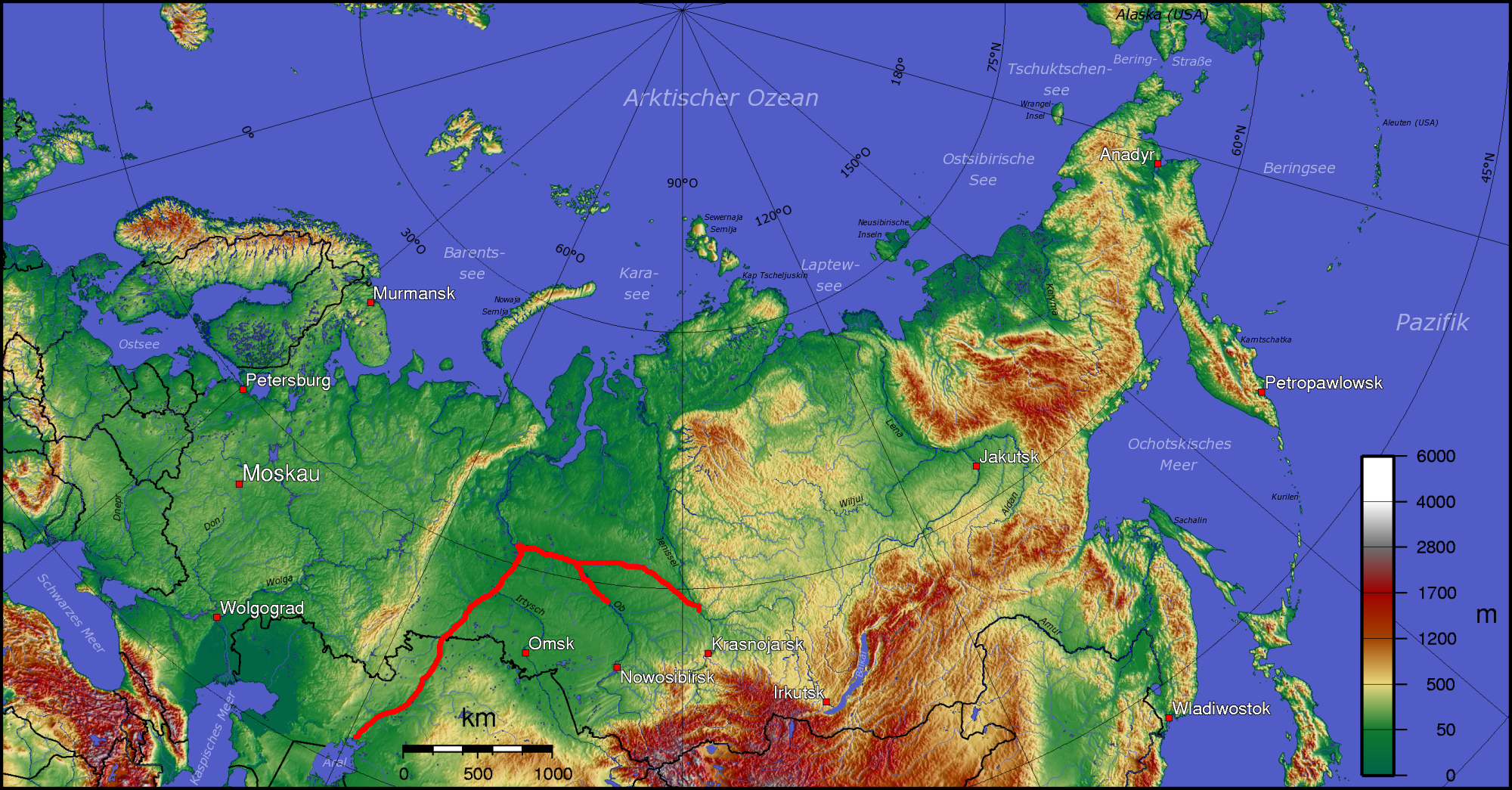
The layout of one of the main proposed water transfer routes (via a Yenisei–Ob canal, down the Ob, up the Irtysh and Ishim, and then via a canal to the Aral Sea basin). The plan would involve other canals (not shown) to take the water further south.

The Northern river reversal or Siberian river reversal was a large-scale project to divert the flow of the Northern rivers in the Soviet Union, which "uselessly" drain into the Arctic Ocean, southwards towards the populated agricultural areas of Central Asia, which lack water.

Research and planning work on the project started in the 1930s and was carried out on a large scale in the 1960s through the early 1980s. The controversial project was abandoned in 1986, primarily for environmental reasons, without much actual construction work ever done. Since the 21st century, interest resurfaced for a potential resumption of the project.

== History ==
=== Discussions and proposals ===
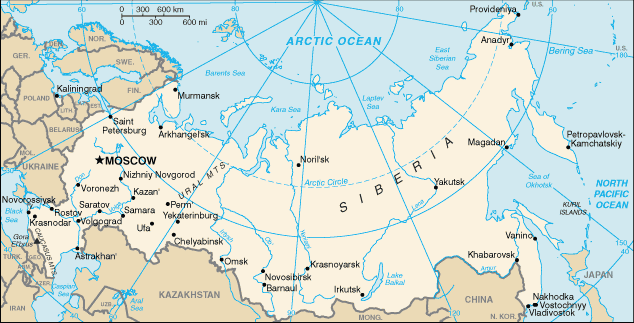
Map of Russia showing rivers that could be redirected from the Arctic

The project to turn Siberian rivers goes back to the 1830s, when tsarist surveyor Alexander Shrenk proposed it around the same time other major canal projects, such as Suez Canal and Panama Canal, were being proposed.

In the 1930s, this idea of turning rivers was again discussed on a smaller scale. In November 1933, a special conference of the USSR Academy of Sciences approved a plan for a "reconstruction of the Volga and its basin", which included diverting parts of the Pechora and Northern Dvina into the Volga basin instead of the Arctic Ocean. Hydroproject conducted research in this aspect, with the dam and canal institute led by Sergey Zhuk. The institute developed some design plans, but they were not widely publicized and did not lead to construction work on the ground.

In January 1961, several years after Zhuk's death, Nikita Khrushchev presented a memo by Zhuk and another engineer, G. Russo, about the river rerouting plan to the CPSU Central Committee. Despite the ousting of Khrushchev in 1964, discussions continued about potentially rerouting major rivers including Pechora, Tobol, Ishim, Irtysh, and Ob. The USSR Academy of Sciences held an environmental impact study with the participation of about 120 institutes and agencies and conducted a dozen conferences on this topic. The promoters of the project claimed that extra food production due to the availability of Siberian water for irrigation in Central Asia could provide food for about 200,000,000 people, with the goal not only to improve irrigation, but also to replenish the shrinking Aral Sea and Caspian Sea.

=== Start of construction ===
In the 1970s, construction began on the Pechora–Kama Canal with the goal of diverting the Pechora into the Volga basin. In 1971, Soviet authorities revealed the use of three 15-kiloton PNEs spaced 165 metres (540 ft) apart, as part of the Nuclear Explosions for the National Economy program, claiming negligible radioactive fallout and manageable pollution.

In March 1976, the 25th CPSU Congress approved the project diverting Siberian rivers southwards. However, the project did not move forward due to high costs, and no further construction work occurred on the Pechora–Kama canal.

=== Abandonment ===
In 1986, in response to high financial cost and opposition from Siberian communities, the Soviet Politburo passed the resolution "On the Cessation of the Work on the Partial Flow Transfer of Northern and Siberian Rivers", which ended this project and halted discussion on this matter for more than a decade. It was estimated that 250 more nuclear detonations would have been required to complete the levelling for the channel if the procedure had been continued.

=== Potential resumption ===
In the early 21st century, interest on this project again rose especially among Central Asian leaders. In September 2002, Uzbek president Islam Karimov held an informal summit with other Central Asian leaders to discuss potentially reviving this water diversion project. Yury Luzhkov, the mayor of Moscow at the time, was supportive of this project.

In October 2025, the Russian Academy of Sciences decided to revive this project with modifications, namely using pipelines instead of canals for water transfer.

== Environmental impact ==
Scientists have come to different conclusions regarding the environmental impact of river reversals in Siberia. Physicist Glenn Werth from the Lawrence Livermore Laboratory in the University of California considered the environmental impact manageable, stating that the project would be "both safe and economical".

By contrast, other scientists warned of different negative impacts this project may have on the environment. Some have warned that reducing the flow of warmer fresh water could cause the expansion of polar ice and shorten the growing season in Siberia, along with a reduction in rainfall due to changes in polar winds and currents. Others have warned that reducing river flow in Siberia would increase salinity in the Arctic Ocean, which would accelerate ice melt and worsen global warming.

According to Alexey Yablokov, President of the NGO Centre for Russian Environmental Policy, 5–7% redirection of the Ob's water could lead to long-lasting changes in the climate of the Arctic and elsewhere in Russia, and he opposes these changes to the environment affected by Siberian water redirections to the south. Despite the increase in Siberian rainfall, the redirection has become highly politicised, and Yaroslav Ishutin, director of the Altai Krai Regional Department of Natural Resources and the Environment, claims that the Ob has no water to spare and that Siberia's water resources are threatened. Alexander Yanshin, who led a petition from academics against this project, voiced similar concerns about water shortages in Siberia, a decrease in fish stocks, drying up of marshes and peat fires which could lead to extinctions.

== See also ==
- Water export
- Bradfield Scheme
- Coastal reservoir
- Chicago River reversal
- Grand Korean Waterway
- Great construction projects of communism, other ambitious Soviet projects
- Great Plan for the Transformation of Nature
- Indian Rivers Inter-link – commonly known as the Garland Canal project; a proposed project that aims to connect the perennial rivers of northern India with the seasonally-dry rivers of southern India; for the purposes of water supply and flood control.
- Irtysh–Karamay–Ürümqi Canal
- North American Water and Power Alliance
- South–North Water Transfer Project
