= Severnaya Sosva =

River in Russia

Severnaya Sosva Северная Сосьва
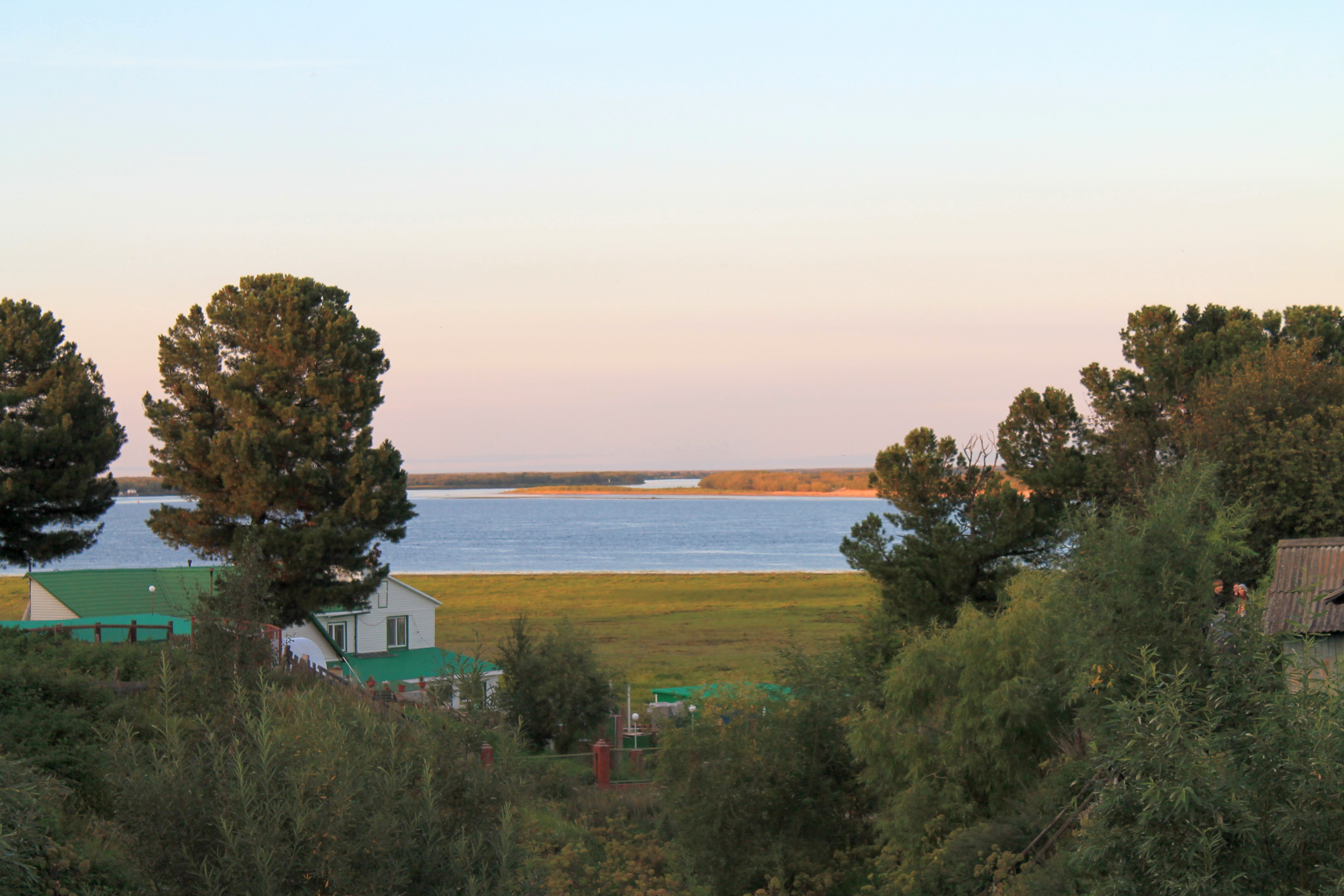

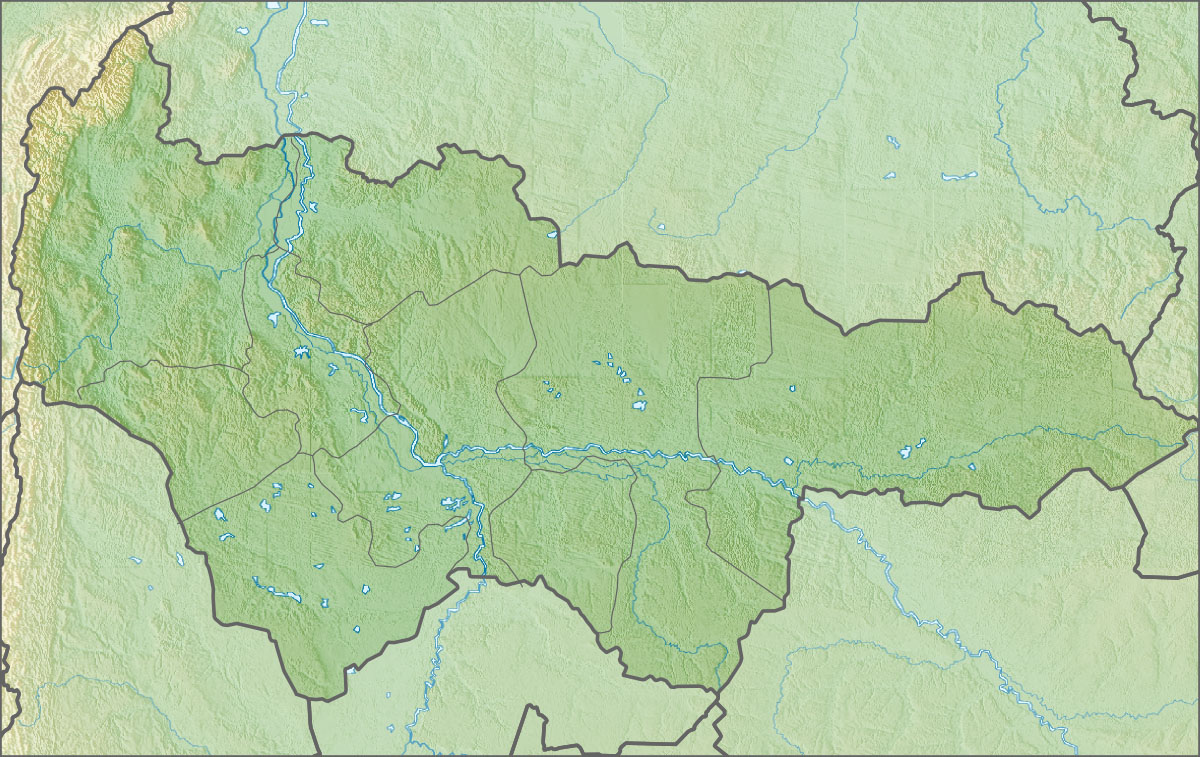
- Mouth location in Khanty-Mansi Autonomous Okrug, Russia
- Native name: Та̄гт, Со̄с-я̄ (Mansi); Ԓэв (Khanty)

Location
- Country: Russia
- Region: Khanty-Mansi Autonomous Okrug
- City: Berezovo

Physical characteristics
- Mouth: Malaya Ob
  - coordinates: 64°11′23″N 65°25′55″E
- Length: 754 km (469 mi)
- Basin size: 98,300 km^{2} (38,000 mi^{2})
- Discharge
  - average: 860 m^{3}/s (30,000 cu ft/s)

Basin features
- Progression: Malaya Ob→ Ob→ Kara Sea
- Tributaries
  - left: Lyapin, Vogulka
  - right: Malaya Sosva, Tapsuy

The Severnaya Sosva (Russian: Северная Сосьва, "Northern Sosva”; Northern Mansi: Со̄с-я̄, Та̄гт; Sōs-jā, Tāgt) is a river in Khanty-Mansi Autonomous Okrug, Russia, which drains the northern Ural Mountains into the lower Ob. It discharges into the Malaya Ob, a branch of the Ob.

== Geography ==
The river and its tributaries are basically T-shaped. The Khulga and Lyapin flow south for about 201 kilometres (125 mi) parallel to the Urals while the main Northern Sosva flows about 201 kilometres (125 mi) northward. The united rivers then flow east southeast about 160 kilometres (100 mi) almost to the Ob near Igrim and then flow north about 80 kilometres (50 mi) before joining the Ob at Beryozovo. Its headwaters are just east of the headwaters of the Pechora on the other side of the Urals and somewhat north of the headwaters of the southeast-flowing Pelym.

The Severnaya Sosva is 754 kilometres (469 mi) long, and the area of its basin is 98,300 square kilometres (38,000 mi^{2}). The average discharge of the river is 860 cubic metres per second (30,000 cu ft/s). It is frozen between November and April and floods (mostly snowmelt) from May to September. Like many rivers in the West Siberian Plain, it has an extensive flood plain with marshes and meanders. In spring the area near the Ob often floods. The channel width sometimes approaches 1 kilometre (0.6 mi) and the flood plain 40 kilometres (25 mi). The river is navigable by ships in the lower region.

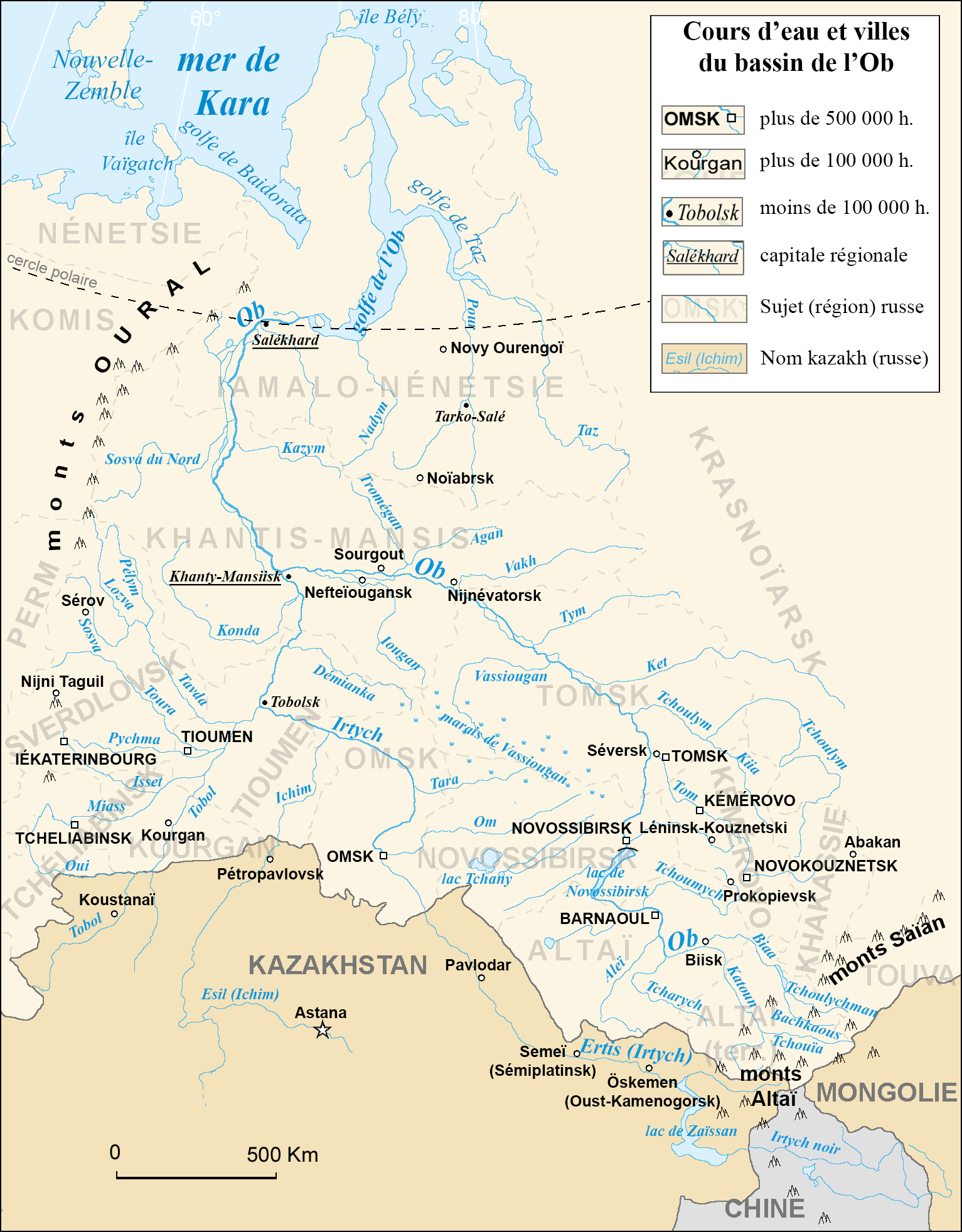
The Northern Sosva in the Ob Basin - double click to expand

There are two Malaya Sosva rivers. The larger flows north to join the Northern Sosva near Igrim. The other joins the Bolshaya Sosva to form the Northern Sosva.

== Trade route ==
There was some ill-documented Russian trade in the area before the Russian conquest of Siberia. After about 1593 the Northern Sosva was one of the main routes into Siberia (for the others, see Verkhoturye). The route ran from the Pechora River, up the Shchugor River, over either of two passes and down the Sosva to the Ob and the fur-rich Mangazeya region. By the late 17th century the fur trade declined and most trade shifted south to Verkhoturye and some north to the Usa.

== See also ==
- List of rivers of Russia
