= Pizhma (Pechora) =

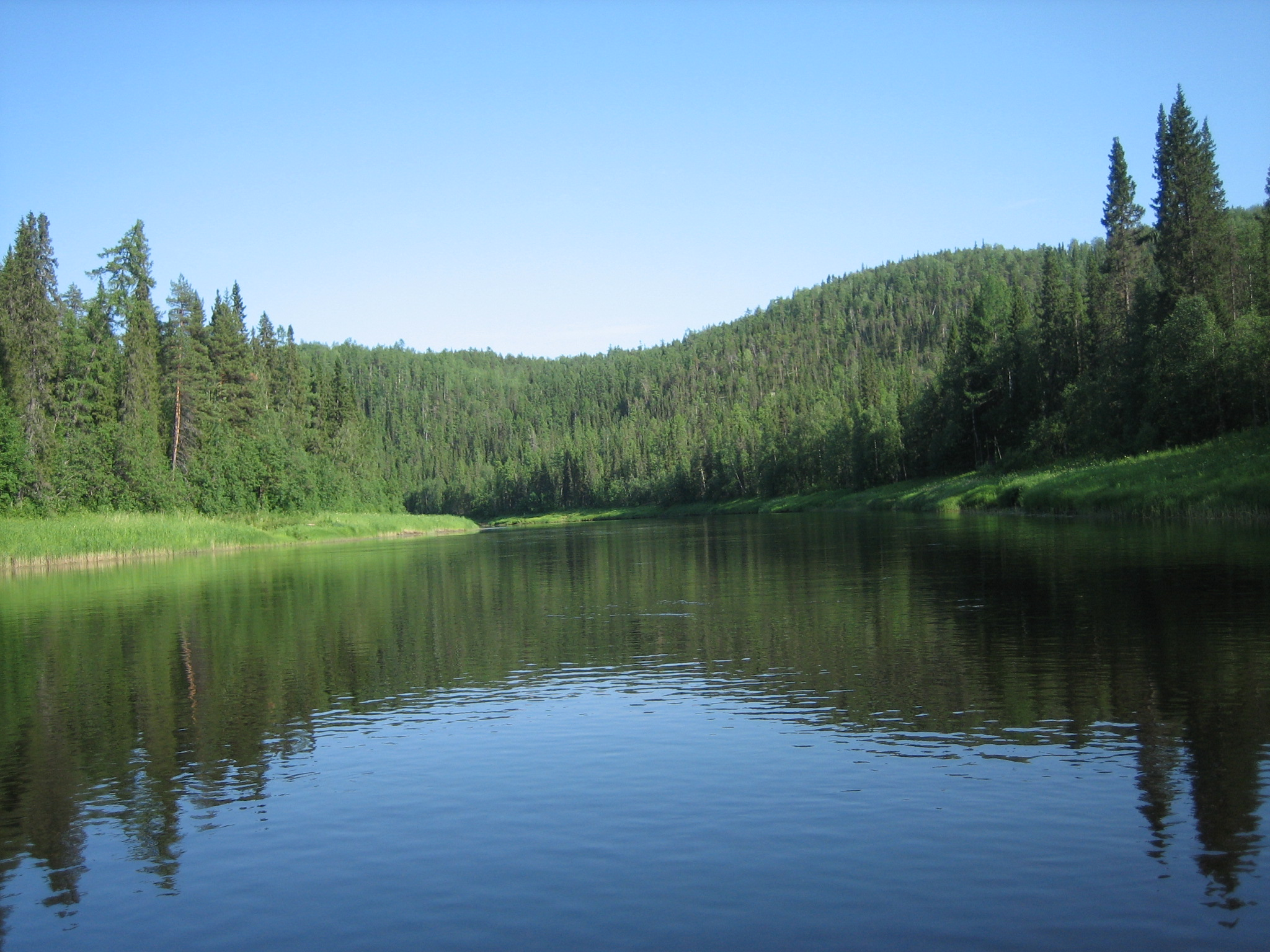

Location
- Country: Russia

Physical characteristics
- Mouth: Pechora
  - coordinates: 65.4108°N 52.1372°E
- Length: 283 km (176 mi)
- Basin size: 5,470 km^{2} (2,110 sq mi)

Basin features
- Progression: Pechora→ Barents Sea

The Pizhma (Russian: Пижма) is a river in the Komi Republic in Russia, an arm of the Pechora. The river is 283 kilometres (176 mi) long and has a drainage basin of 5,470 square kilometres (2,110 mi^{2}). The Pizhma flows southeast out of the Yamozero Lake, turns east and then north and joins the Pechora at Ust-Tsilma, where the Tsilma also joins the Pechora. The river freezes up in late October or early November and stays icebound until late April or early May. The Pizhma is navigable along its lower reaches.
