= Manaraga =

Mountain in Komi Republic, Russia

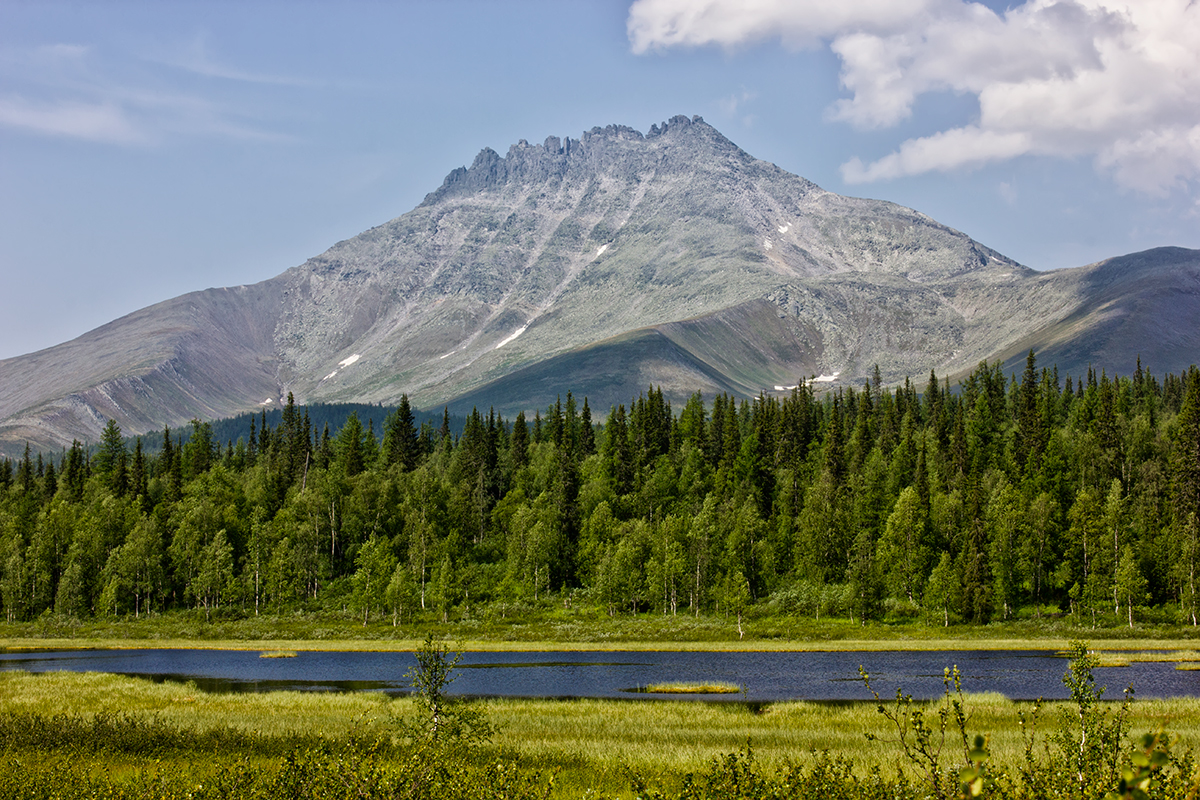

Highest point
- Elevation: 1,662 m (5,453 ft)
- Coordinates: 65°02′37.45″N 59°45′19.40″E

Geography
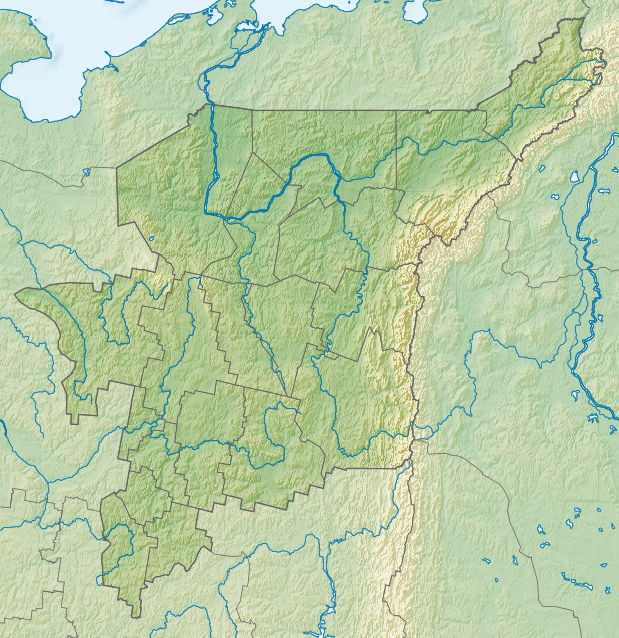
- Location within European Russia Location within Komi Republic Location within Russia
- Location: Komi republic, Russia
- Parent range: Ural Mountains

Manaraga is a peak in the northern Ural Mountains in Yugyd Va National Park, within the Komi Republic, in Russia. It has an elevation of 1,662 metres (5,453 ft).

== Geography ==
It is located 16.5 km west of Mount Narodnaya, the highest peak in the Ural mountains.

The slopes of the peak are gentle and grassy, but the summit is jagged and rocky. Manaraga translated from Nenets means "Bear Paw".

== Administrative and territorial situation ==
It is located on the territory of the Yugyd Va National Park in the Pechora municipal district of the Komi Republic. The highest mountain, located entirely within the Northwestern Federal District and the Komi Republic in particular.

== In culture ==
Manaraga is the title of a novel by Vladimir Sorokin published in 2017.

== See also ==
- Yugyd Va National Park
