= Virgin Komi Forests =

Protected area of Russia

UNESCO World Heritage Site
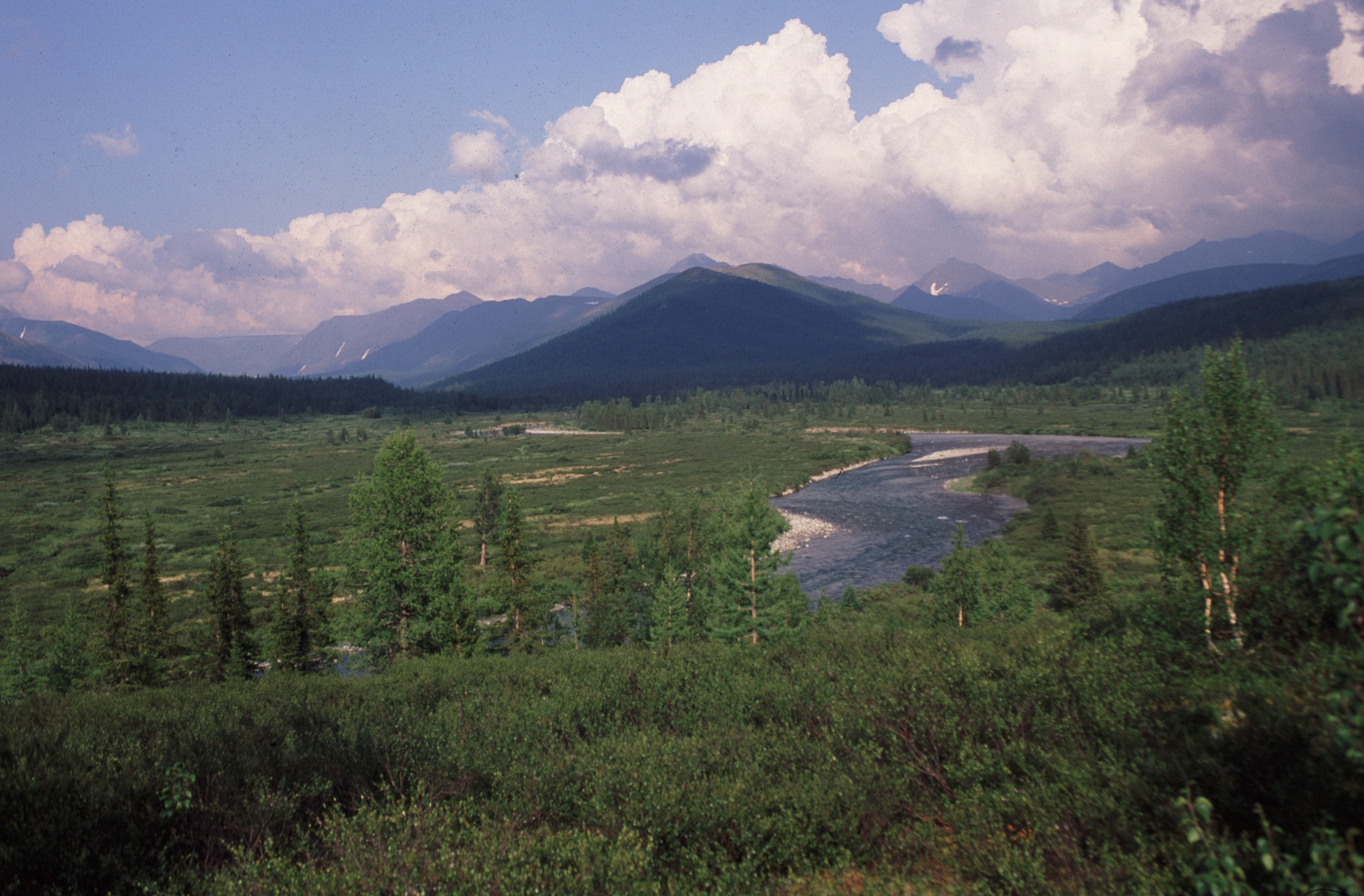

- Location within European Russia Location within Europe
- Location: Ural Mountains, Komi Republic, Russia
- Includes: 1. Yugyd Va (Clear Water) National Park; 2. Pechoro-Ilychskiy Nature Reserve; 3. Yaksha Forest District
- Criteria: Natural: (vii), (ix)
- Reference: 719
- Inscription: 1995 (19th Session)
- Area: 2,645,800 ha (10,215 sq mi)
- Buffer zone: 650,000 ha (2,500 sq mi)
- Website: http://www.vfk.komi.com
- Coordinates: 63°37′33″N 58°57′9″E

The Virgin Komi Forests (Komi: Комилӧн вӧрзьӧдлытӧм вӧръяс, Russian: Девственные леса Коми) is a natural UNESCO World Heritage Site in the Northern Ural Mountains of the Komi Republic, Russia. At 32,800 km^{2} it is the largest virgin forest in Europe.

== Geography and ecology ==
The Virgin Komi Forests, located in the northeastern part of European Russia, encompasses approximately 3.28 million hectares, making them the largest expanse of virgin boreal forest in Europe. This vast area includes diverse landscapes such as tundra, alpine tundra, and boreal forests, situated west of the Ural Mountains in the Komi Republic.

The region's flora is dominated by coniferous species, including Siberian spruce, Siberian fir, and Siberian larch. Deciduous trees like aspen and birch are also prevalent, contributing to the area's rich biodiversity. The forests serve as a haven for rare species and contain one of Europe's most valuable stores of genetic and biological diversity.

The fauna of the Virgin Komi Forests is equally diverse, supporting species such as reindeer, sable, European mink and mountain hare. The area is also home to various bird species, including the capercaillie and the Siberian jay. These ecosystems have been monitored and studied for over fifty years, providing valuable evidence of the natural processes affecting biodiversity in the taiga.

The Virgin Komi Forests are part of the Ural Mountains taiga ecoregion, characterized by a subarctic climate with long, cold winters and short, warm summers. This climate supports extensive peat bogs, rivers, and natural lakes, which play a crucial role in carbon sequestration and maintaining regional hydrology. The forests' pristine condition offers a unique opportunity to study natural boreal ecosystems without significant human interference.

In recognition of their ecological significance, the Virgin Komi Forests were designated as a UNESCO World Heritage Site in 1995, becoming Russia's first natural site to receive this status. This designation includes two protected areas: the Pechora-Ilych Nature Reserve, established in 1930, and the Yugyd Va National Park, created in 1994. Together, these areas play a vital role in preserving the unique biodiversity and ecological processes of the region.

== Threats ==
Despite the area's recognition as a World Heritage site, attempts at extracting gold are being actively lobbied by the Head of the Republic and Komi's Ministry of Nature.

== Gallery ==
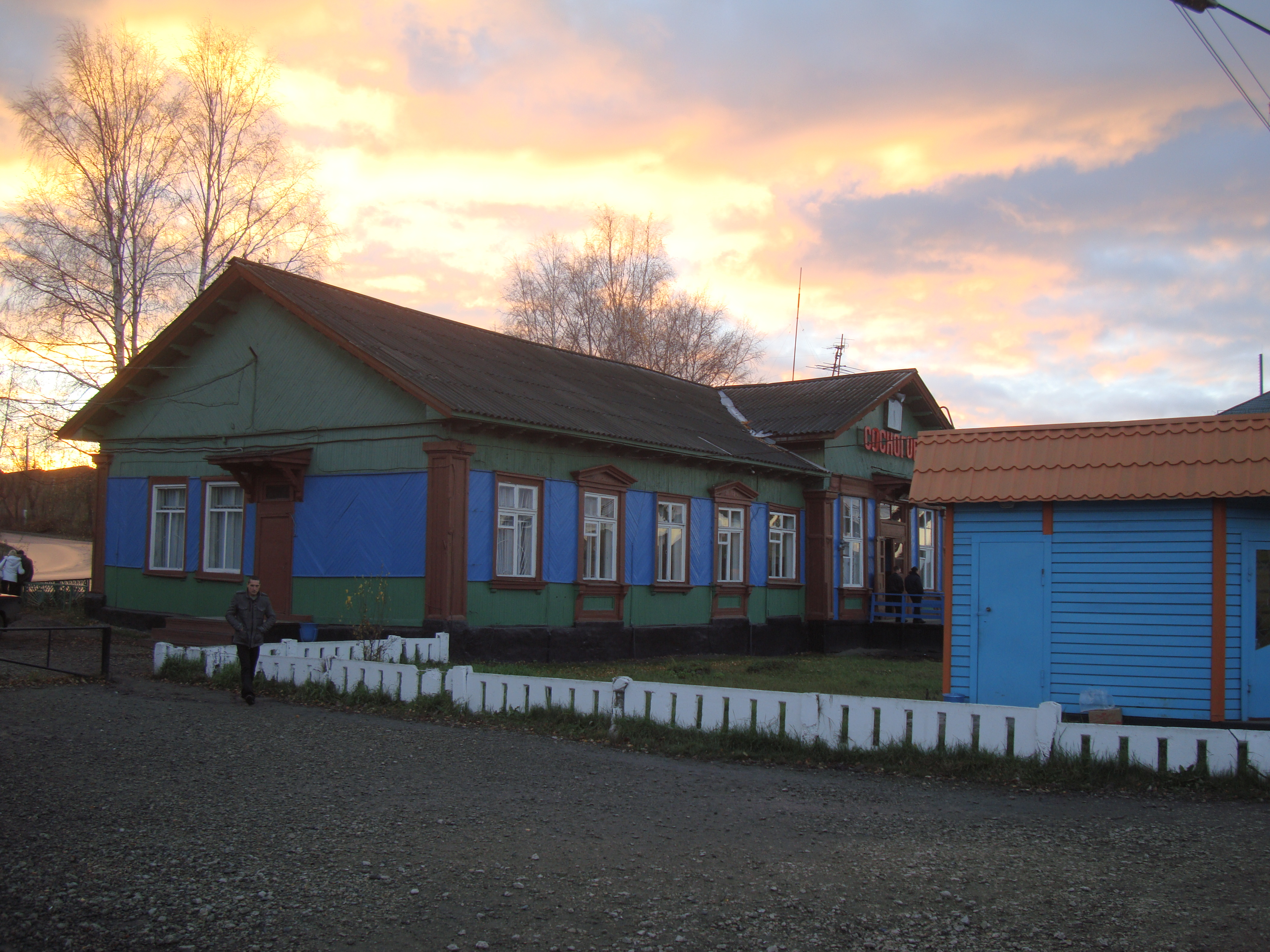
Sosnogorsk, Komi Republic

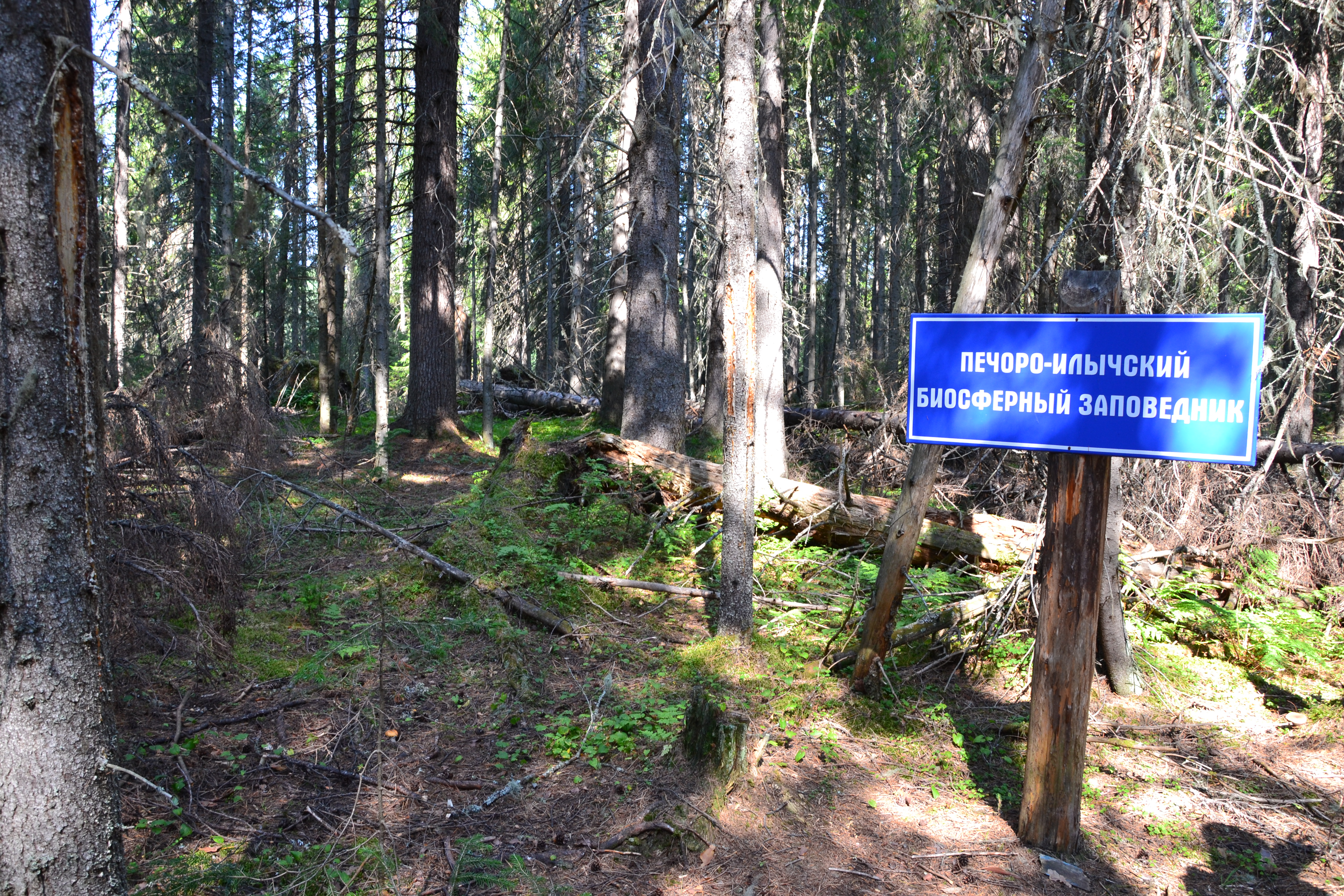
Pechora-Ilych Biosphere Reserve
