= Mamontovaya Kurya =

Archaeological site in Russia

- Мамонтовая курья (Russian)
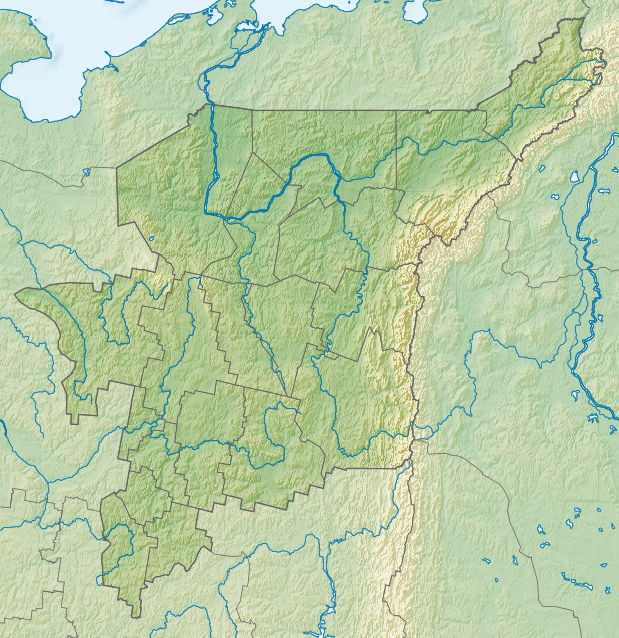
- Location in the Komi Republic, Russia
- 66°34′N 62°25′E
- Periods: Paleolithic

History
- Built: ca. 40,000 BP

Mamontovaya Kurya (Russian: Мамонтовая курья, "the mammoth curve") is a Palaeolithic site on the Usa river, Komi Republic, Russia. The site includes stone artifacts, animal bones and a mammoth tusk with human-made marks. Dated to 40,000 years before present, this is the oldest documented evidence of hominin activity at this latitude.

== See also ==
- Bluefish Caves
