= Yugyd Va National Park =

National park in Russia

Югыд ва
- Yugyd Va National Park
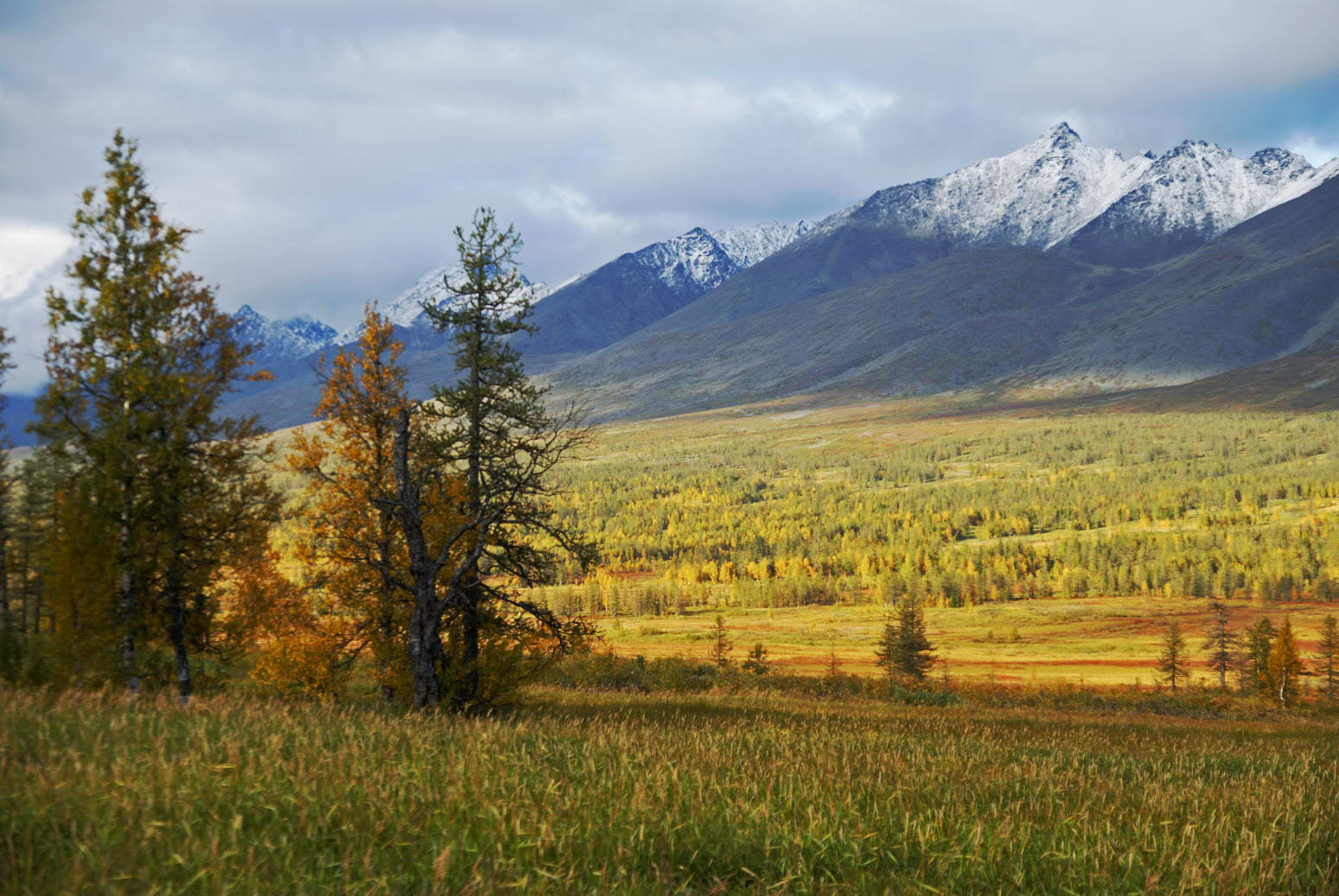

- Location within Russia
- Location: Komi Republic, Russia
- Coordinates: 62°25′N 58°47′E
- Area: 18,917 square kilometers
- Established: April 23, 1994

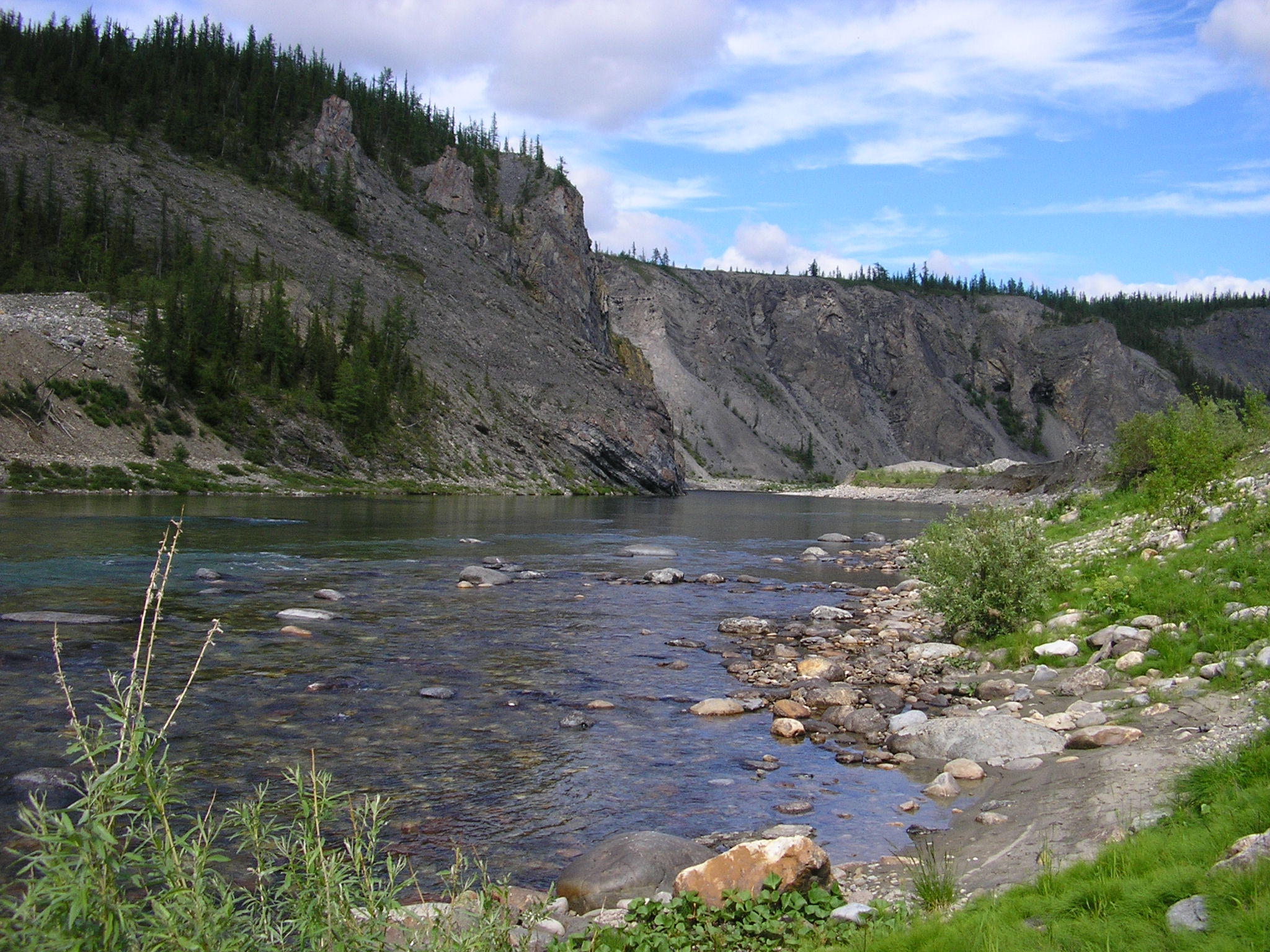
The Kozhim River in Yugyd Va National Park

Yugyd Va National Park (Komi, Russian: Югыд ва) is a national park in the Komi Republic, a republic of Russia. It is Europe's largest national park (ahead of Vatnajökull National Park in Iceland) and it was Russia's largest national park until the creation of Beringia National Park in 2013.

== History ==
The park was created by the Russian Government on April 23, 1994, with the goals of protection and recreational use of the taiga forests of the Northern Urals.

In 1995, the forest area including the Yugyd Va National Park and the nearby Pechora-Ilych Nature Reserve were recognized by UNESCO as a World Heritage Site, Virgin Komi Forests.

== Geography ==
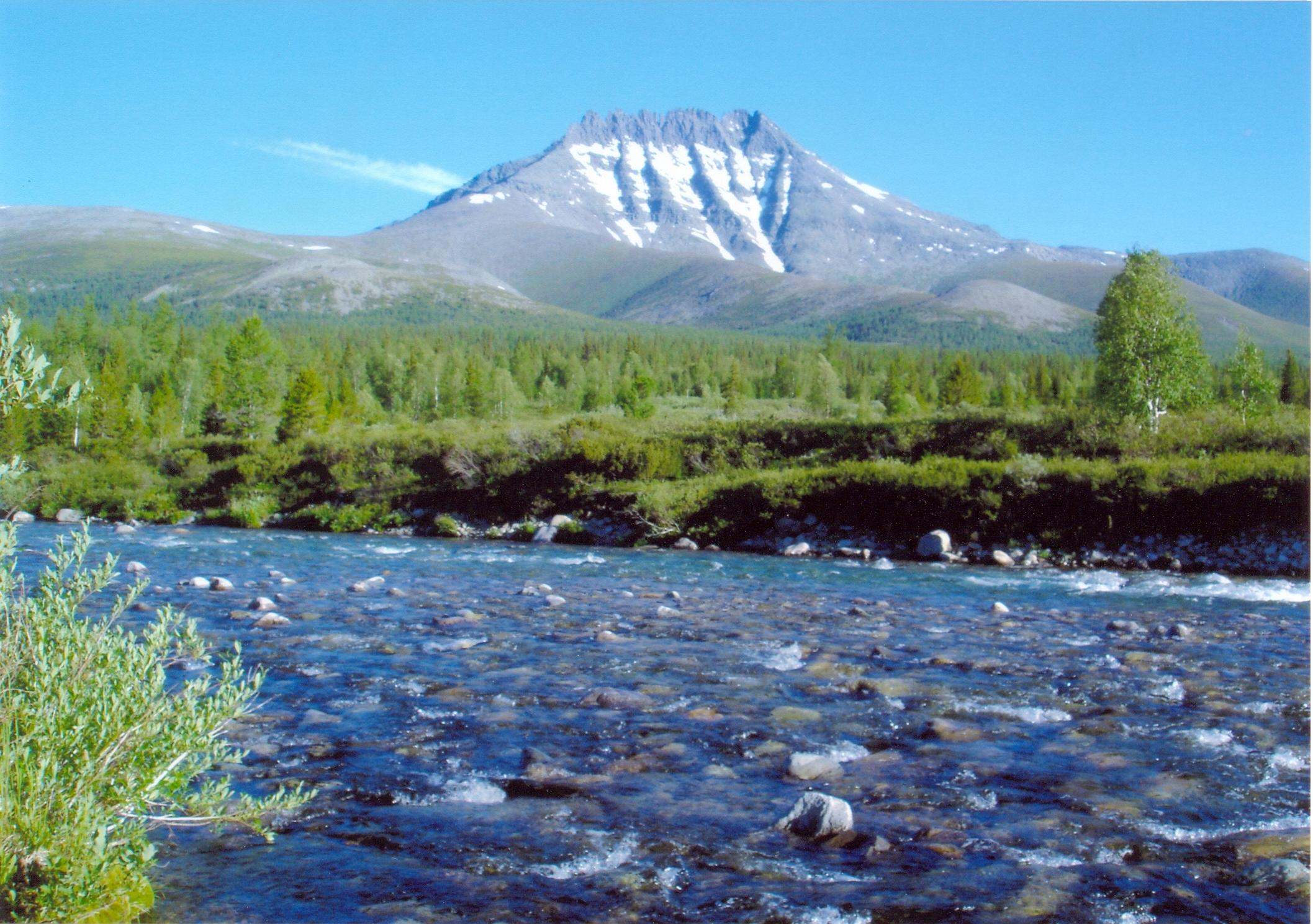
Manaraga River near Mount Manaraga.

The Yugyd Va National Park is located on the western slopes of the Polar Urals and Northern Ural, on the border of Europe and Asia. The rivers flowing from the western slope of the Ural Mountains, such as the Bolshaya Synya supply water to the Pechora River, one of the largest rivers in Europe flowing into the Barents Sea. The natural boundary of the park in the east is the main ridge of the Ural mountains, in the north—the Kozhim River, in the west—the rivers Synja, Vangir and Kosya, in the south—the Pechora-Ilych Nature Reserve. The territory of the park is part of the Prepolar-Ural physical-geographical area and is located in three zones—mountain, foothill and lowland, which were formed more than 200 million years ago. It is here in the central part of the Yugid Va National Park that the highest peaks of the Ural Mountains are: the Mount Narodnaya (1894.5 m), as well as the Mount Karpinsky (1878 m), Bell Tower (1724 m), Manaraga (1662 m), Nioroika (1645 m).

== Wildlife ==
More than half of the park is covered with the taiga boreal forest; the rest is mostly tundra, found at higher elevations. There are also some 20 km^{2} of meadows, both alpine ones and those in the river valleys.

Some 180 bird species live in the park, some of them quite rare. Twenty fish species are known to inhabit the park's rivers and lakes. There are also five amphibian species and one reptile species in the park.

Among the mammals common in the park are the mountain hare, flying squirrel, reindeer, ermine, otter, Alces alces (known as the moose in North American English and elk in British English), wolf, fox, wolverine, bear, pine marten, weasel, Arctic fox.

== Tourism ==
Recreational uses of the park include rafting, boating, and hiking in the summer, Nordic skiing in winter. Limited hunting is allowed too, but permits have to be applied for several months in advance.

Due to the remote location of the park, the amount of tourism there is still quite low. According to the park's management, it is currently visited by some 4,000 tourists every year, which is much less than the park's potential recreational capacity. The management was concerned with the fact that the user fees (some 2.4 million roubles (US$100,000) a year) did not cover park expenses (some 5 million roubles (US$200,000) a year).
