= Sula (Pechora) =

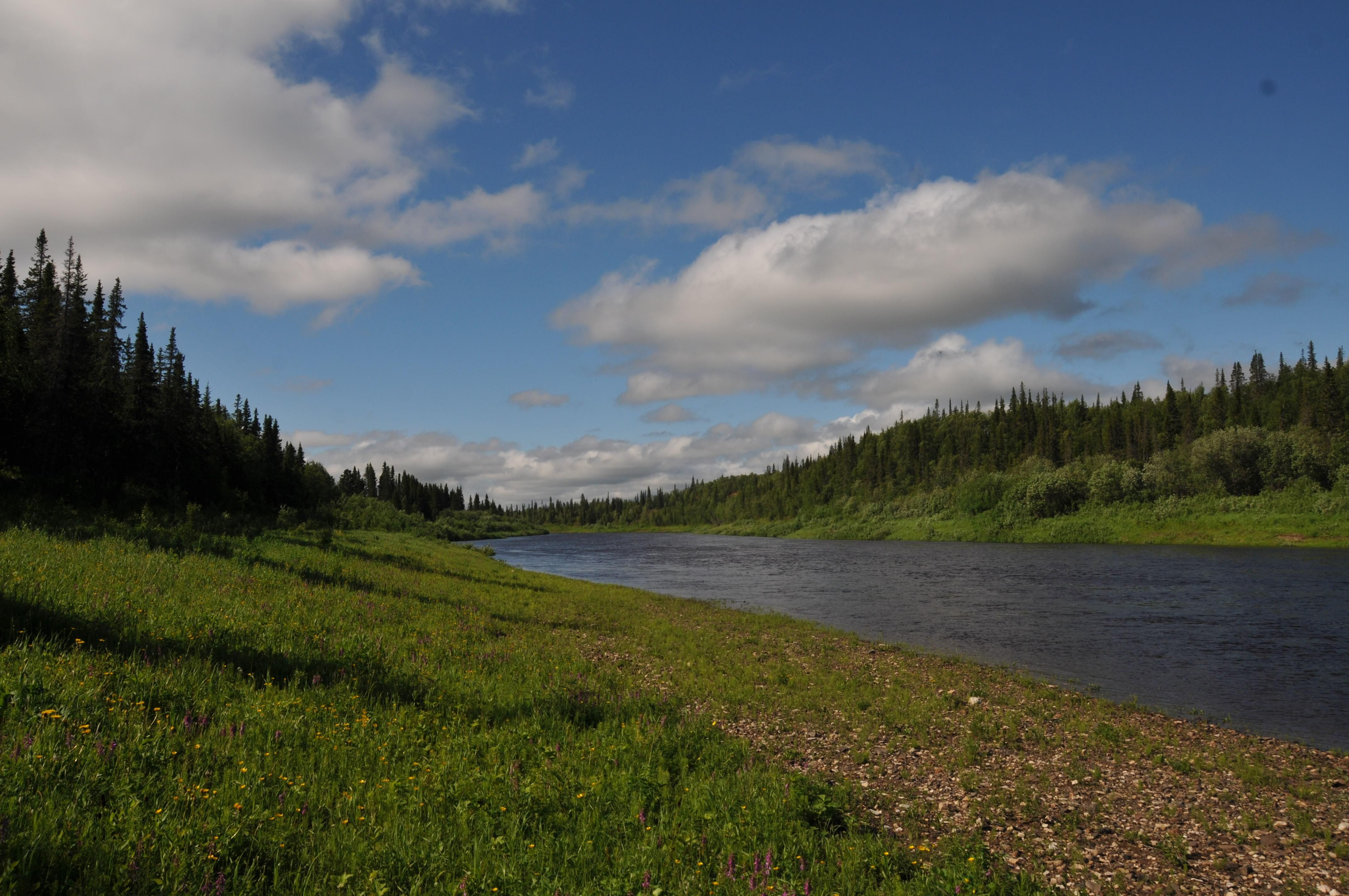

Location
- Country: Russia

Physical characteristics
- Mouth: Borshchyovy Shar
  - coordinates: 67.0761°N 52.0812°E
- Length: 353 km (219 mi)
- Basin size: 10,400 km^{2} (4,000 sq mi)

Basin features
- Progression: Borshchyovy Shar→ Pechora→ Barents Sea

The Sula is a river in Nenets Autonomous Okrug and Komi Republic, Russia. It is a left tributary of the Pechora, flowing into its left branch Borshchyovy Shar near Velikovisochnoye, Nenets Autonomous Okrug. It is 353 kilometres (219 mi) long, and has a drainage basin of 10,400 square kilometres (4,000 sq mi).
