= Ilych =

Location
- Country: Russia

Physical characteristics
- Mouth: Pechora
  - coordinates: 62°30′45″N 56°43′58″E
- Length: 411 km (255 mi)
- Basin size: 16,000 km^{2} (6,200 sq mi)

Basin features
- Progression: Pechora→ Barents Sea

The Ilych (Russian: Илыч) is a river in the Komi Republic in northwest Russia. It drains part of the northern Ural Mountains westward into the upper Pechora. The river is 411 kilometres (255 mi) long, and the area of its drainage basin is 16,000 square kilometres (6,200 mi^{2}). The Ilych freezes up in early November and stays icebound until late April. Its main tributaries are the rivers Kogel and Palyu. The Pechora-Ilych Nature Reserve lies along the left bank of the Ilych.
