= Lyapin =

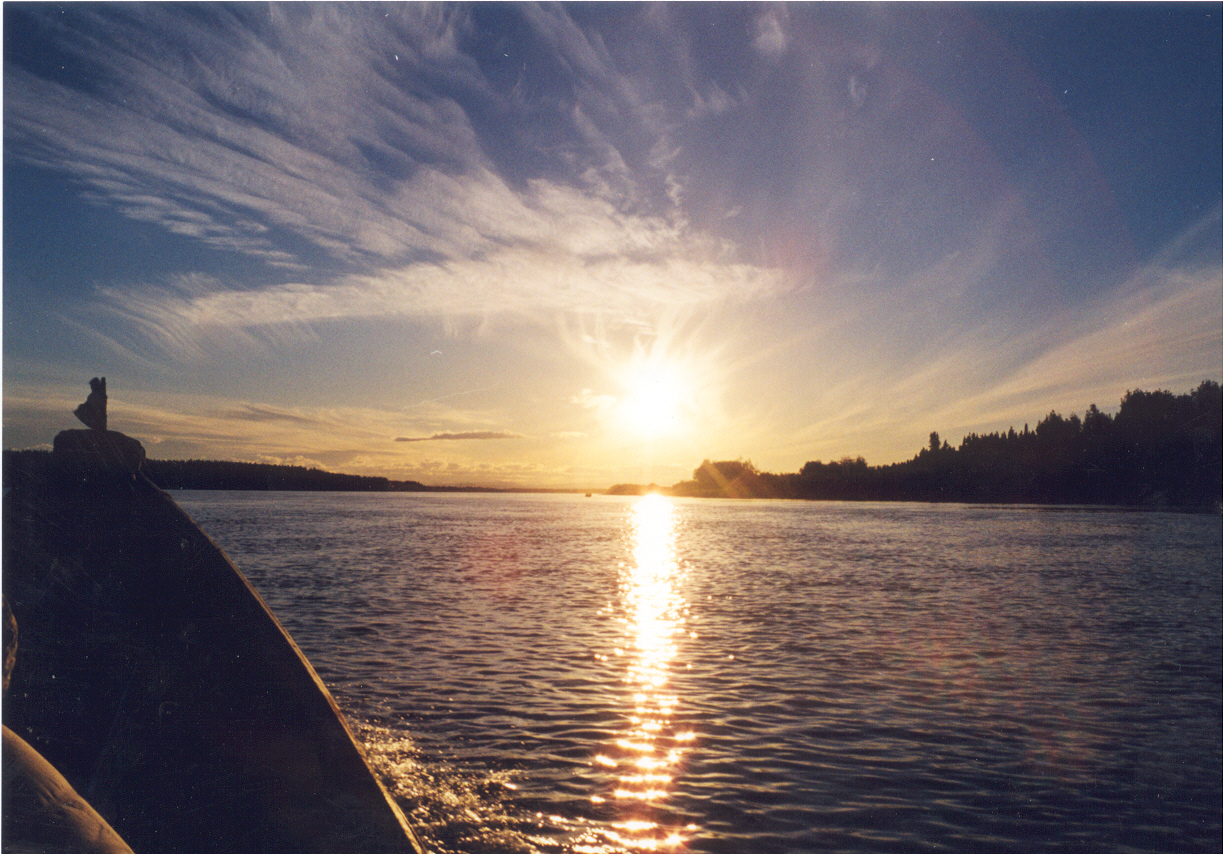

Location
- Country: Russia

Physical characteristics
- Source
  - coordinates: 64°16′43″N 60°54′54″E
- Mouth: Severnaya Sosva
  - coordinates: 63.6242°N 61.8568°E
- Length: 151 km (94 mi)
- Basin size: 27,300 km^{2} (10,500 sq mi)

Basin features
- Progression: Severnaya Sosva→ Malaya Ob→ Ob→ Kara Sea

The Lyapin (Russian: Ляпин; Mansi: Сакв-я̄, Sakv-jā) is a river in Khanty-Mansi Autonomous Okrug, Russia, a left tributary of the Severnaya Sosva. It is 151 kilometres (94 mi) long, and has a drainage basin of 27,300 square kilometres (10,500 sq mi).
