= Pechora-Ilych Nature Reserve =

Strict nature reserve in the Komi Republic, Russia

- Russian: Печоро-Илычский заповедник
- IUCN category Ia (strict nature reserve)
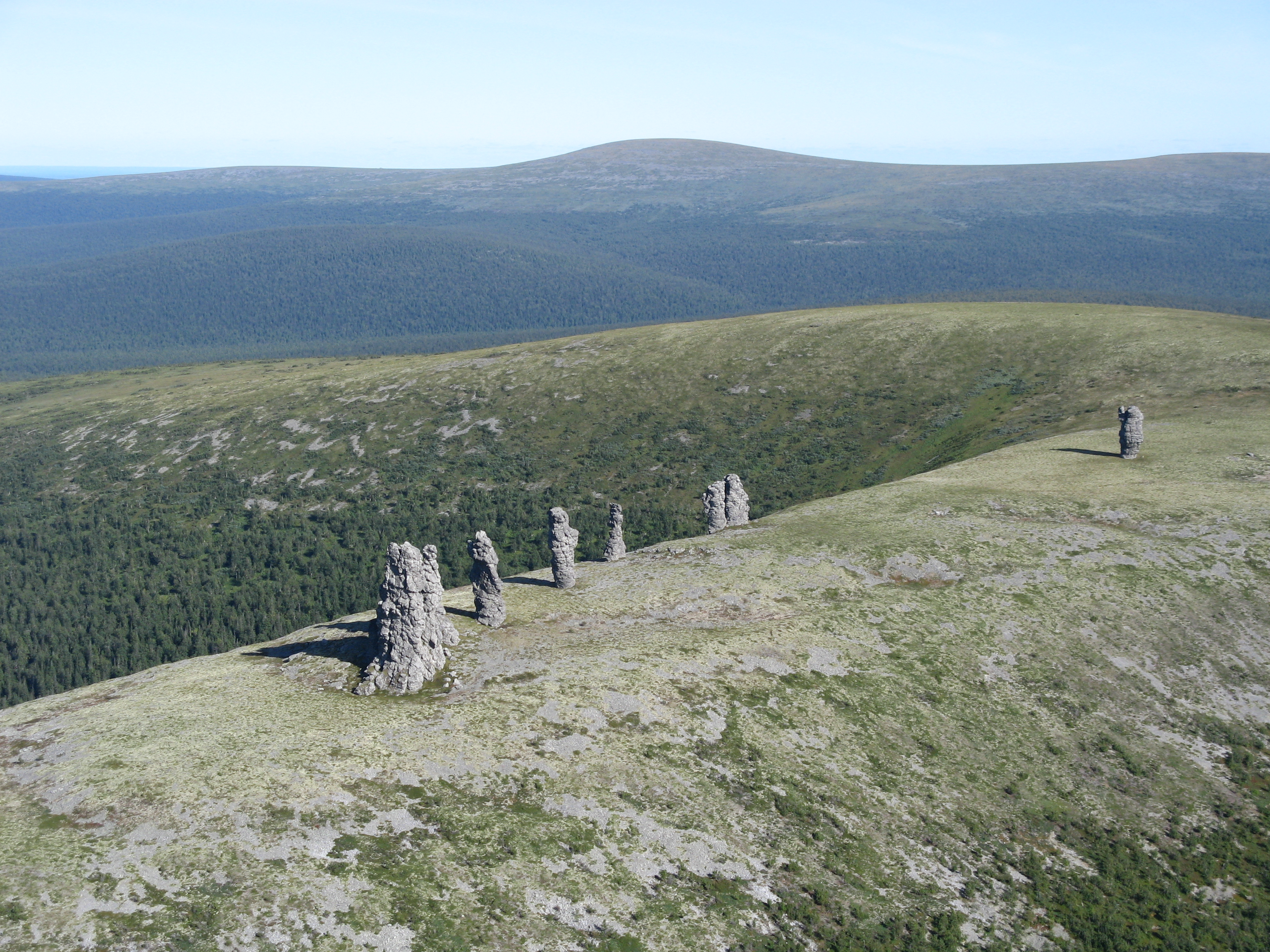
- Manpupuner rock formations in Pechora-Ilych Zapovednik

- Location within Russia
- Location: Komi Republic
- Coordinates: 62°34′30″N 58°15′30″E
- Area: 721,300 hectares (1,782,371 acres; 2,785 sq mi)
- Established: 1930
- Governing body: Ministry of Natural Resources and Environment (Russia)

Pechora-Ilych Nature Reserve (Russian: Печоро-Илычский заповедник, Pechoro-Ilychsky zapovednik) is a Russian 'zapovednik' (strict nature reserve) in the Komi Republic, Russia. It currently occupies 7,213 square kilometers and forms the core of the World Heritage Site Virgin Komi Forests.

== Topography ==
The nature reserve is located in the south-eastern corner of the Komi Republic (Troitsko-Pechorsky District), on the western slopes of the Ural Mountains and the adjacent foothills and lowlands. The area is drained by the upper course of the Pechora River and its tributary the Ilych, from whose names the name of the reserve is derived.

== History ==
The idea of the creation of a nature reserve in the upper Pechora, as a sable zakaznik (sanctuary), was proposed in 1915 by S. T. Nat, the Chief Forester of Vologda Guberniya, in his article in Lesnoy Zhurnal (Forest Journal). The nature reserve was created on May 4, 1930, originally occupying 11,350 square kilometers. The borders of the reserve were set on July 30, 1931.

Originally, the reserve's main office was built in the village of Ust-Ilych, at the fall of the Ilych into the Pechora. Access to that location being extremely difficult, the main office was moved in 1935 to the village of Yaksha, further upstream on the Pechora, but closer to the Kama River basin, via which the area communicated with the outside world in those days.

In 1951 the reserve was greatly reduced in size, to a mere 930 km^{2}; its area became non-contiguous, with a small lowland section near Yaksha being separated from the highland part. In 1959 the area of the reserve was increased to its current size (7,213 km^{2}), but it still remains non-contiguous. To better protect the reserve, in 1973 a buffer area of 324 km^{2} (similar in status to a national forest in the United States) was created outside of the reserve; the size of the buffer area size was increased in 1984 by additional 330 km^{2}.

Since 1986 reserve has been listed by UNESCO as one of the biosphere reserves of the World Network of Biosphere Reserves. In 1995 the forest area including the Pechora-Ilych Nature Reserve and its northern neighbor, the Yugyd Va National Park, were recognized by UNESCO as a World Heritage Site, under the name Virgin Komi Forests.

== Ecoregion and climate ==
Pechora-Ilych is in the Urals montane tundra and taiga ecoregion, a region that covers the main ridge of the Ural Mountains (both sides) - a 2,000 km (north-south) by 300 km (west-east) region. The region is on the divide between European and Asian ecoregions, and also the meeting point of tundra and taiga.

The climate of Pechora-Ilych is Humid continental climate, cool summer (Köppen climate classification Subarctic climate (Dfc)). This climate is characterized by mild summers (only 1-3 months above 10 °C (50.0 °F)) and cold, snowy winters (coldest month below −3 °C (26.6 °F)).

== Landscape and vegetation ==
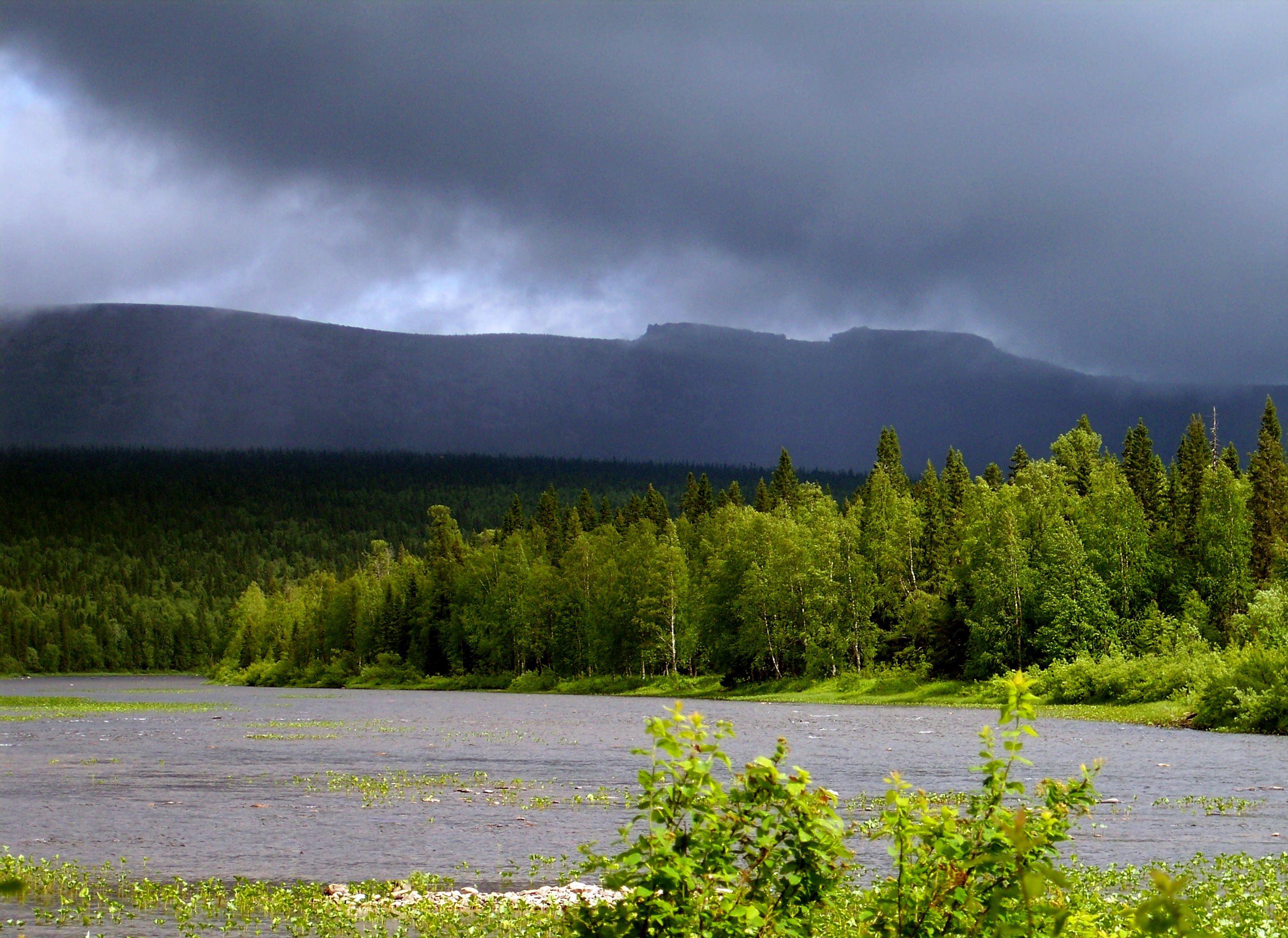
Upper Pechora River and Bear Stone Mountain; Pechora-Ilych Reserve

Russian geographer A.A. Korchagin divided the area of the reserve into five natural regions:

- The Pechora lowlands: pine forests, pine forested swamps, and moss swamps. There are few spruce forests in that area. This region includes the Gusinoe Bolota (Goose Swamp), a peat bog that occupies around 3 km^{2}, with the peat deposits some 5–6 meters deep.
- The piedmont (foothills) region, dominated by forests of shade-loving species: Siberian spruce, Siberian pine, and Siberian fir. There are abundant forested swamps there, but hardly any moss swamps.
- The Upper Ilych lowland: this region is surrounded by the Urals highlands and mountains and has particularly severe climate. The slow-growing forest there is classified as boreal taiga.
- The Ural Mountains, the area that is the least studied but has the greatest variety of landscapes. It includes the piedmont forest belt (fir and spruce), up to 300–350 meters in elevation. Above it, up to 600 m elevation, is the subalpine forest belt, where firs and spruces are gradually replaced with birch forests and subalpine meadows. The tree line is at 550–650 m elevation, although there are occasional firs at the elevations as high as 800 m or even higher. Above the tree line, alpine meadows and then tundra are found.
- The valleys of the Pechora, Ilych, and their tributaries.

== Wildlife ==
Moose, beavers, squirrels, pine martens are abundant in the reserve. Sables are known to live in the piedmont forest region of the reserve. The wild reindeer have almost disappeared after the loss of the pine forest section of the reserve in 1951, and consequent habitat destruction.

The large predators include brown bears, wolves, and wolverines. Ten mustelid species make the reserve their home, from the largest, the wolverine, to the least weasel, as well as the ermine, the American and European mink, the pine marten, the sable, and the Siberian weasel.

== Research work ==
Over the years, scientific research in many areas of biology and ecology was conducted in the reserve. Topics of research ranged from ants to squirrels to fish. The moose was a particularly important topic of research in the reserve.

== Moose domestication experiments ==
The moose (Alces alces) has long been an object of research at the Pechora-Ilych Nature Reserve.

In the late 1940s, the management of the reserve encountered the problem of unsustainable growth of the moose population. By the early 1950s, pastures in the reserve started to be exhausted. To handle the problem, in 1956 a moose hunting enterprise (лосепромысловое хозяйство) was instituted. The enterprise was affiliated with the reserve, but located outside of its territory. It has been economically successful. Between 1956 and 1968, 1000 moose were taken, providing 200 tons of meat. At the same time, hunting operations allowed the collection of valuable statistics on the biology of the Pechora moose population.

Besides moose hunting, in 1949 the reserve staff created the facility they referred to as a "moose farm" (лосеферма, loseferma) to study the feasibility of moose domestication. The first director of this project was Yevgeny Knorre. After he moved to the Volga-Kama Nature Reserve in 1962, his student M. V. Kozhukhov became the director.

The main objectives of the farm were to learn more about moose biology and to use this knowledge to develop suitable food rations for the moose and techniques for caring for them; to study the feasibility of raising a farm-bred population; and to explore the possibilities of the use of the moose in the national economy.

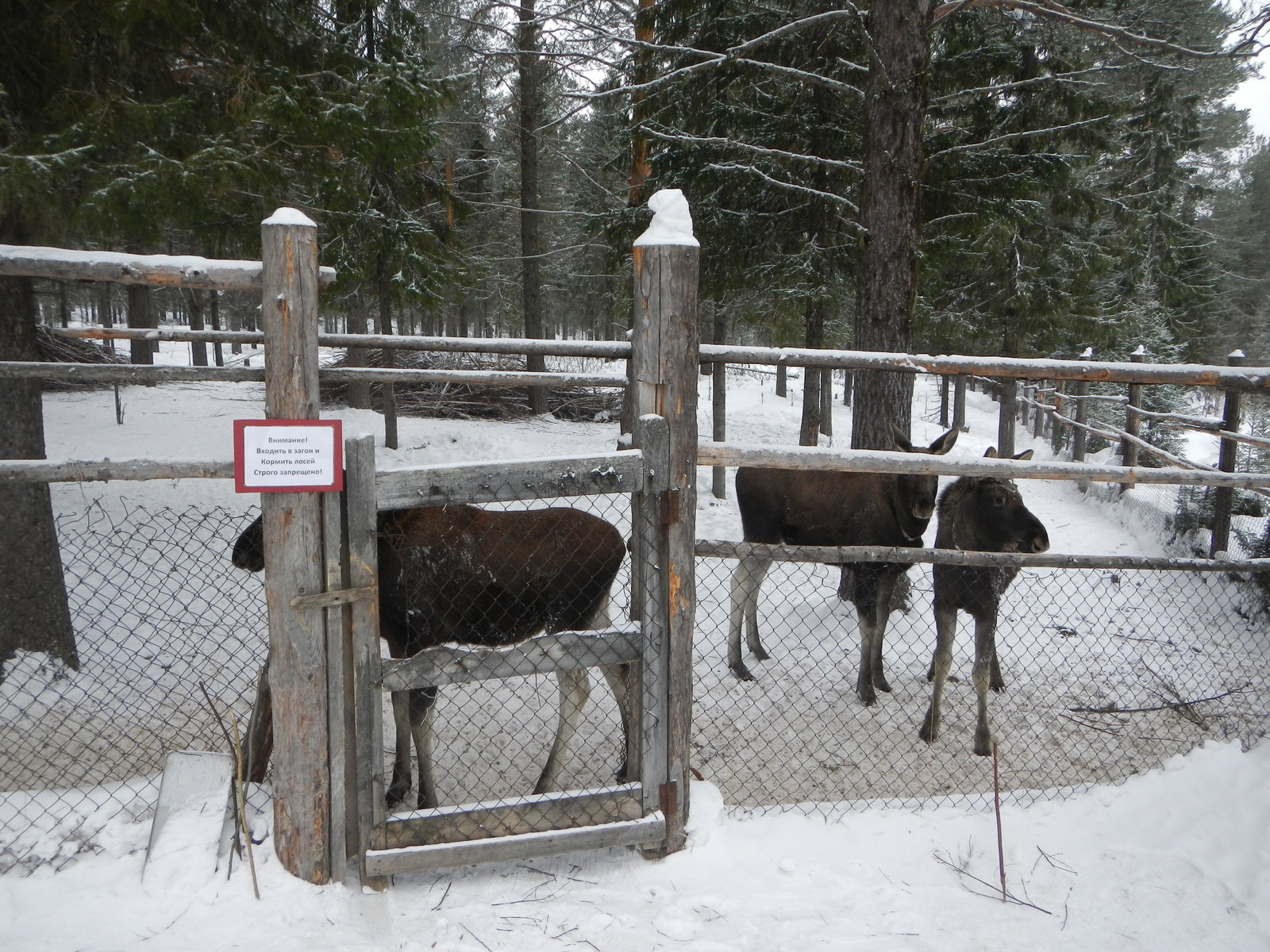
Three moose in the corral, March 2012

Over the first 40-plus years of the project, six generations of moose were raised on the farm, with some 30–35 animals at the farm in any given year. About 15 moose calves were raised at the farm in a good spring. The total number of the animals raised over the year is said to have exceeded 500.

The farm's adult moose would spend most of the time browsing in the forest; however, a pregnant moose cow would always come back to the farm to give birth. Then, during the lactation period of three to five months, the moose cow would come to the farm several times a day, at the same hours, to be milked. The milk production of a moose is small compared to a dairy cow: over the lactation season, a total of 300–500 liters (75–125 gallons) of milk is obtained from a moose. However, the milk has a high (12–14%) fat content, and is rich in vitamins and micronutrient elements; it is said to have medicinal properties.

A farm-raised moose can live as long as 18 years, although few reached that age because of the depredations of wolves, bears, and poachers on the free-ranging population.

Among the potential productive uses of the moose, the milk production was found the most promising. However, riding a moose and using it to pull a sleigh were tried at the farm as well.

Over the years, a number of research articles dealing with the physiology, ethology, and ecology of the moose were published by the biologists from the reserve, as well as from the research institutes in Syktyvkar and Moscow (e.g.)

Knorre's and his associates' moose domestication work at Pechora Ilych, as well as somewhat similar Muskox Domestication Project at the University of Alaska's Institute of Northern Agricultural Research, also provided valuable insights in the general theory of animal domestication.

The facility, located in the remote Northern Urals taiga, was never meant to turn a profit, and found itself in a difficult situation after the government funding cutbacks of the early 1990s. According to a recent trip report, the moose farm operations have been greatly reduced; the remaining buildings are in a poor conditions, and only a few animals remain. A Moscow teacher visiting in 2003 reported that there were only five left. However, moose domestication experiments in Russia continue at the more favorably located Kostroma Moose Farm.

== See also ==
- List of Russian Nature Reserves (class 1a 'zapovedniks')
- WikiCommons gallery: Manpupuner rock formations

== Sources ==
- moose-farm.ru (in English)
- Pechora-Ilych Nature Reserve (in Russian)
- Pechora-Ilych National Biosphere Nature Reserve (in Russian)
- D.V. Zhitnev (Д.В.Житенев), M.M. Serebryanny (М.М.Серебрянный) "Research Activities in Pechora Ilych Nature Reserve. World's First Experimental Moose Farm". (Научная деятельность в Печоро-Илычском заповеднике. Первая в мире опытная лосеферма) (1988) (in Russian)
- Pechora Ilych Reserve "moose farm", a recent trip report (in Russian)
- T.Lecomte, "La réintroduction de l'Elan (Alces alces) dans les zones humides: Un projet dans le cadre du développement durable des zones humides éfavorisées" (Nov-1998) (in French)
- E.P. Knorre. "Change in the behavior of moose with age during the domestication", Le Naturaliste Canadien, volume 101 (1974), No. 1-2, p. 371-377. (in English)
