= Kolva (Usa) =

Physical characteristics
- Mouth: Usa
  - coordinates: 65°55′30″N 57°19′04″E
- Length: 564 km (350 mi)
- Basin size: 18,100 km^{2} (7,000 sq mi)

Basin features
- Progression: Usa→ Pechora→ Barents Sea

The Kolva (Russian: Колва) is a river in Nenets Autonomous Okrug and the Komi Republic in Russia. It is a right tributary of the Usa of the Pechora basin. The length of the river is 564 km (350 mi). The area of its basin 18,100 km^{2} (7,000 sq mi). The Kolva freezes up in late November and stays under the ice until mid-May.
