= Shchugor =

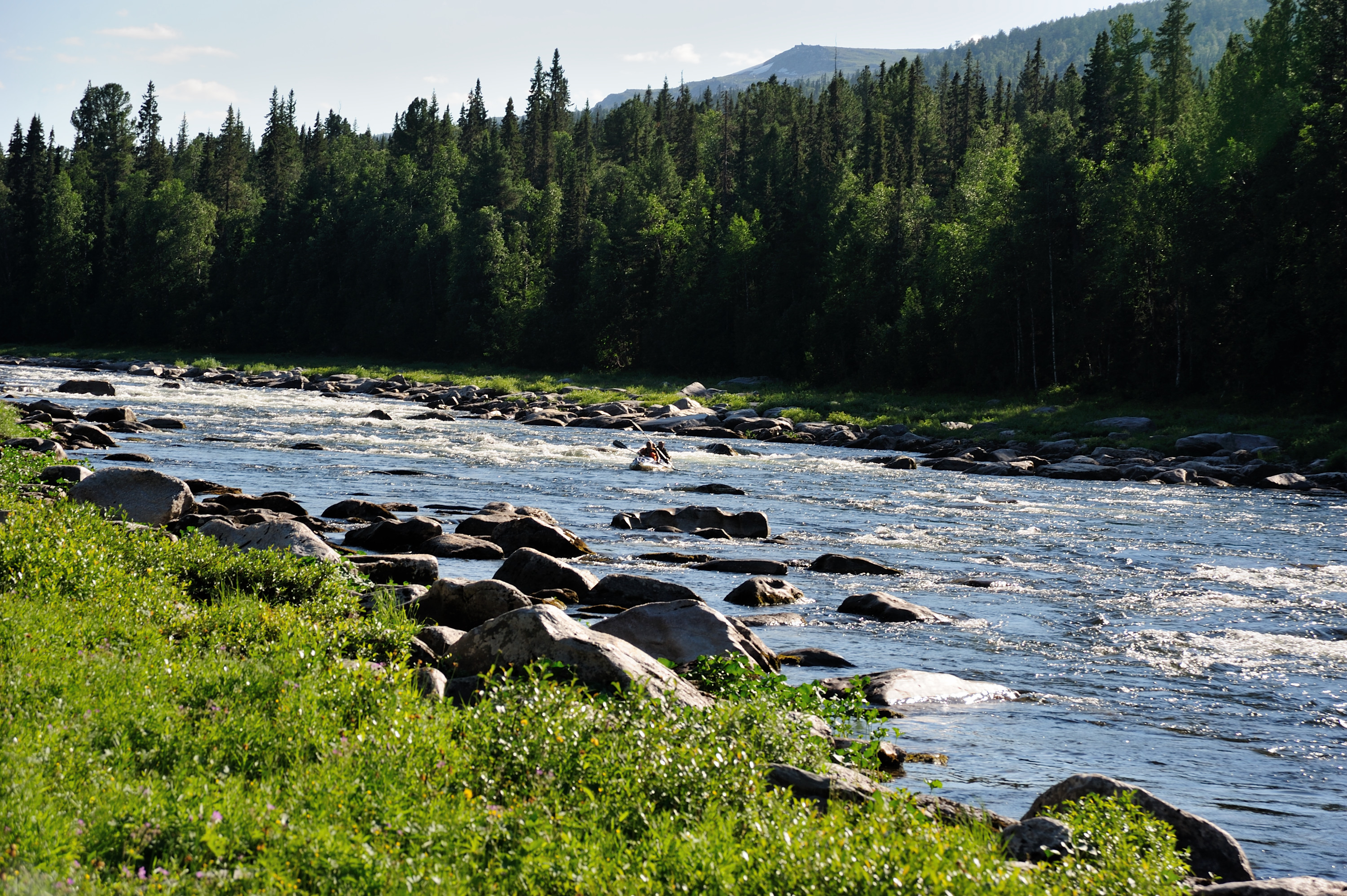

Location
- Country: Russia

Physical characteristics
- Mouth: Pechora
  - coordinates: 64.2531°N 57.5908°E
- Length: 300 km (190 mi)
- Basin size: 9,660 km^{2} (3,730 sq mi)

Basin features
- Progression: Pechora→ Barents Sea

The Shchugor (Russian: Щугор) is a right tributary to the Pechora in the Komi Republic, northwest Russia. It is 300 kilometres (190 mi) long, and has a drainage basin of 9,660 square kilometres (3,730 sq mi).
