= Oksino =

Oksino Оксино
- Interactive map of Oksino
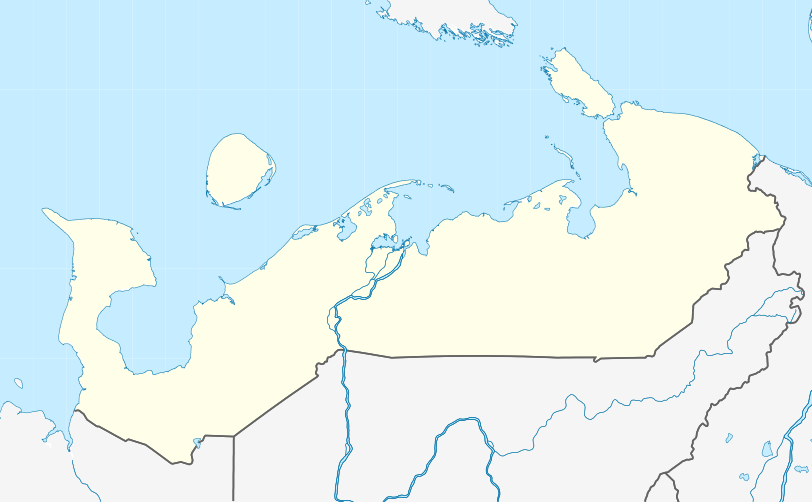
- Location of Oksino Oksino (Nenets Autonomous Okrug)
- Country: Russia
- Federal subject: Nenets Autonomous Okrug
- Founded: 1574

Population (2010 Census)
  - Total: 339
  - Estimate (2021): 279 (−17.7%)
- Time zone: UTC+3 (MSK)
- Postal code: 166703
- Dialing code: +7 81853
- OKTMO ID: 11811463101
- Website: oksino-nao.ru/main

Oksino is a village in Zapolyarny District, Nenets Autonomous Okrug, Russia. It had a population of 339 as of 2010, a decrease from its population of 429 in 2002.

== Climate ==
Oksino has a subarctic climate (Dfc).
