= Yaksha, Komi Republic =

- Interactive map of Yaksha, Komi Republic
- Location of Yaksha, Komi Republic
- Coordinates: 61°49′14″N 56°50′04″E
- Country: Russia
- Federal subject: Komi Republic

Population
  - Estimate (2024): 670 )
- Time zone: UTC+3 (MSK)
- Postal code: 169436
- OKTMO ID: 87636498101

Yaksha (Якша) is a settlement in Troitsko-Pechorsky District of the Komi Republic, Russia, located in the upper streams of the Pechora River.

The Pechora is not navigable above Yaksha, and even Yaksha itself is reachable by boat only during the late spring and early summer, when the water level is higher. In the past, Yaksha was the northern (Pechora) end of the portage road connecting Cherdyn in the Kama River basin with the Pechora. A project of building a narrow-gauge railroad in the area to connect the Pechora Basin with that of Kama was considered in the late 19th century, but never acted upon. The 20th century plans for a Pechora–Kama Canal came to nought as well.

Since 1935, the main office of Pechora-Ilych Nature Reserve has been located in Yaksha.
