= Usa (Pechora) =

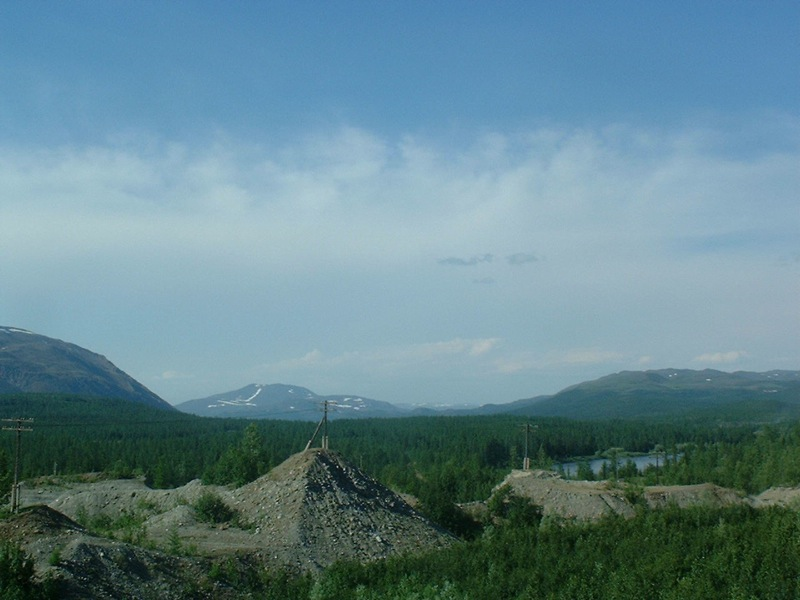

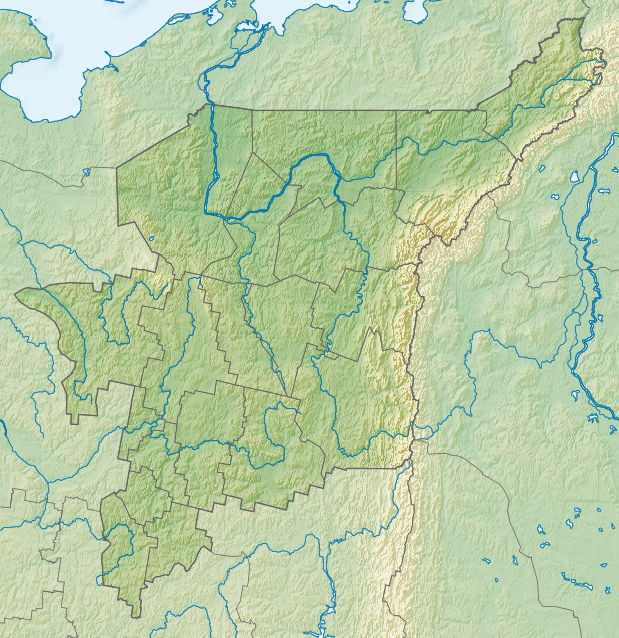
- Mouth location in the Komi Republic

Location
- Country: Komi Republic; Russia

Physical characteristics
- Source
  - location: The northern Ural Mountains
- Mouth: Pechora
  - coordinates: 65.9653°N 56.9336°E
- Length: 565 km (351 mi)
- Basin size: 93,600 km^{2} (36,100 mi^{2})
- Discharge
  - average: 1,310 m^{3}/s (46,000 cu ft/s)

Basin features
- Progression: Pechora→ Barents Sea

The Usa (Russian: Уса́; Komi: Усва, Usva) is a river in the northeast corner of European Russia that drains the Polar Urals southwest into the Pechora. The Polar Urals tend to the northeast and the Usa runs parallel to them. It is in the Komi Republic of Russia and the largest tributary of the Pechora, which it joins from the right. It is 565 kilometres (351 mi) long, with a drainage basin of 93,600 square kilometres (36,100 mi^{2}).

The Usa has an average discharge of 1,310 cubic metres per second (46,000 cu ft/s), but this varies from a maximum of 21,500 cubic metres per second (760,000 cu ft/s) in June to a minimum of 43.9 cubic metres per second (1,550 cu ft/s) in April.

== History ==
The Usa valley has been inhabited for 40,000 years, as evidenced by the archaeological site Mamontovaya Kurya (Russian: Мамонтовой Курьи, "the mammoth curve").

With the Russian conquest of Siberia it became one of the main routes into Siberia. The route ran from the Pechora, which connects to other rivers in northern Russia, up the Usa, across the low Kamen Portage and down the Sob River to Ob River where there were customhouses at the Sob barrier and Obdorsk. During the short summer season this route was preferred by west-bound travellers since most of the sailing was down-river. For other Ural crossings see Verkhoturye.

== Course ==
The river has its sources in the northern Ural Mountains, at the southern end of the Polar Urals, and it flows towards the southwest, roughly parallel to the mountain range. The main river is formed by the confluence of the Bolshaya Usa (Large Usa) and the Malaya Usa (Little Usa) some 30 km east of Vorkuta. The two tributaries are steep, with many rapids and waterfalls. After the confluence the main river is calm, with only a few rapids in its upper sections. Its banks here are high and cliff-like, but further downriver they become lower, wooded and boggy, except for a section around the settlement of Adak (Russian: Адак), where the river cuts through the Chernyshov Hills.

Below the settlement of Sivomaskinsky (Russian: Сивомаскинский) the river gets much wider, and in its lower reaches it is from 700 to 2,000 metres (2,300 to 6,600 ft) wide. It also starts forming meanders and sand islands, and it keeps this appearance all the way to its mouth. Some 30 kilometres (19 mi) from its mouth lies the town of Usinsk and the river port of Parma. The Usa flows into the Pechora River at the settlement of Ust-Usa.

It freezes over in October or November and is icebound until the spring thaw begins in May or June. Its largest tributaries are, from the left: Yelets, Lemva, Bolshaya Synya, Bolshoy Kochmes and Kosyu, and from the right: Vorkuta, Syoyda, Adzva and Kolva.

The river is navigable 325 kilometres (202 mi) upstream from its mouth, and there are river ports at Abez, Petrun, Makarikha, Parma and Ust-Usa. Within the Usa basin is the large Pechora coalfield, and in its lower parts, by the town of Usinsk, there are several big petroleum and natural gas fields.

== See also ==
- List of rivers of Russia
