= Pechora (river) =

River in Northwest Russia

Pechora Russian: Печо́ра; Komi: Печӧра; Nenets: Санэроˮ яха
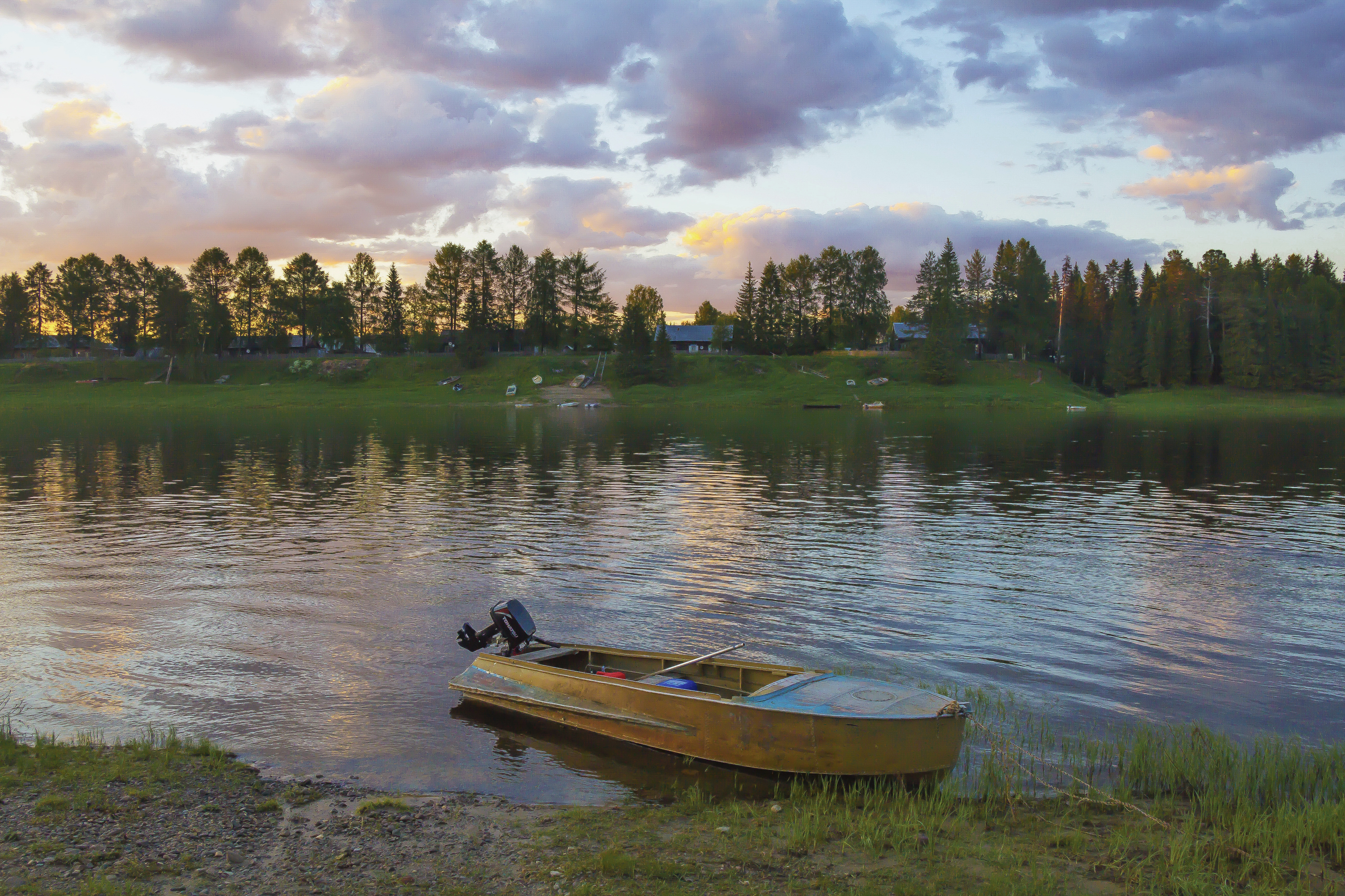

- Pechora catchment area and tributaries
- Etymology: The Russian name of the river is a combination of two words in an old local Nenets dialect, "pe" & "chora". Literally it means "forest dweller".

Location
- Country: Russia
- State: Khantia-Mansia, Komi Republic, Nenets Autonomous Okrug
- Cities: Naryan-Mar, Pechora, Ust-Tsilma

Physical characteristics
- Source: Ural Mountains
  - location: near Nyaksimvol, Khantia-Mansia
  - coordinates: 62°12′N 59°26′E
  - elevation: 630 m (2,070 ft)
- Mouth: Arctic Ocean, Pechora Sea / Barents Sea
  - location: Pechorskaya Guba, Nenets Autonomous Okrug
  - coordinates: 68°18′N 54°25′E
  - elevation: 0 m (0 ft)
- Length: 1,809 km (1,124 mi)
- Basin size: 322,000 km^{2} (124,000 sq mi)
- Discharge
  - location: Barents Sea (near mouth)
  - average: (Period: 1993–2021)150 km^{3}/a (4,800 m^{3}/s) (Period: 1984–2018)159 km^{3}/a (5,000 m^{3}/s) (Period: 1971–2000)4,853.8 m^{3}/s (171,410 cu ft/s)
- Discharge
  - location: Oksino
  - average: (Period: 1971–2015)4,823 m^{3}/s (170,300 cu ft/s) (Period: 1981–1993)4,533 m^{3}/s (160,100 cu ft/s)
  - minimum: 643 m^{3}/s (22,700 cu ft/s)
  - maximum: 17,182 m^{3}/s (606,800 cu ft/s)

Basin features
- River system: Pechora River
- Tributaries
  - left: Unya, Northern Mylva, Velyu, Lemyu, Kozhva, Lyzha, Izhma, Neritsa, Pizhma, Tsilma, Sula
  - right: Ilych, Podcherye, Shchugor, Usa, Laya, Yorsa, Sozva, Shapkina, Kuya

The Pechora (Russian: Печо́ра; Komi: Печӧра; Nenets: Санэроˮ яха) is the sixth-longest river in Europe. Flowing from Northwest Russia and into the Arctic Ocean, it lies mostly in the Komi Republic but the northernmost part crosses the Nenets Autonomous Okrug.

== Geography ==
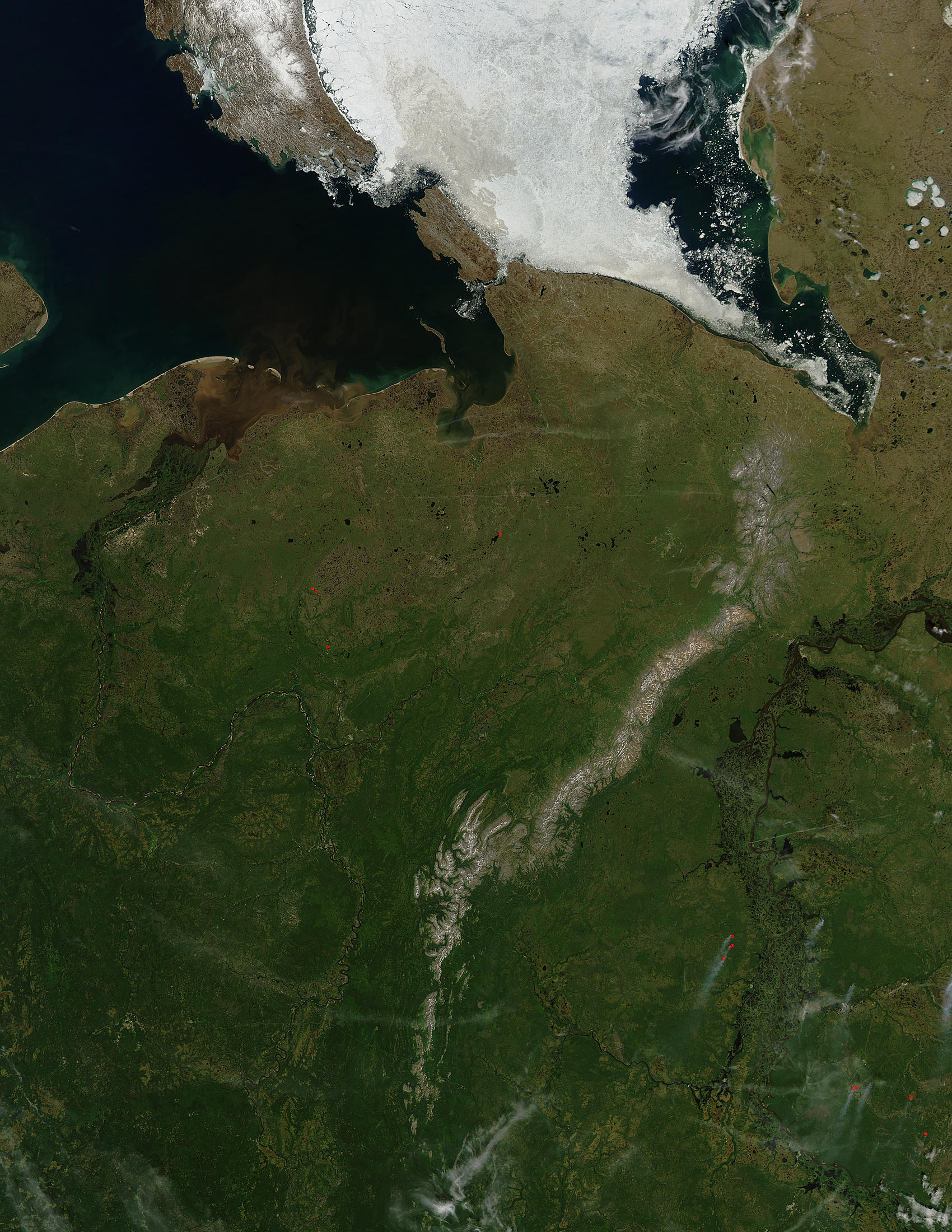
Pechora River, light-colored Ural Mountains and part of the Ob River

The Pechora is 1,809 kilometres (1,124 mi) long (almost 200 km shorter than the Columbia River) and its basin is 322,000 square kilometres (124,000 mi^{2}), or about the same size as Finland. By mean annual discharge it ranks third in Europe, after the Volga and Danube. Its discharge is about three quarters that of the Danube and a little more than its sister, the Northern Dvina, and is the largest of any river with no dams in its basin outside of New Guinea.

West of its lower course is the Timan Ridge. East of the basin along the west flank of the Urals is the Yugyd Va National Park. Also in the basin is the Virgin Komi Forests, the largest virgin forest in Europe. In the far northeast of the basin on the Usa River is the large coal center of Vorkuta. The river was once an important transportation route, especially for those travelling to northwest Siberia. Today a railroad runs southwest from Vorkuta to Moscow.

=== Along the Pechora ===
The river rises in the Ural Mountains in the south-eastern corner of the Komi Republic. This area is part of the Pechora-Ilych Nature Reserve. On the other side of the Urals are the headwaters of the Northern Sosva. The river flows south, then west and turns north near Yaksha which is the head of navigation for small boats. A portage led south to the Kama basin. To the east is the upper Vychegda, a tributary of the Northern Dvina. The river flows past Komsomolsk-na-Pechore to Ust-Ilych where the Ilych joins from the east, then Northwest to Troitsko-Pechorsk (1,359 kilometres (844 mi) from the mouth), north to Vuktyl and Ust-Shchuger where the Shchugor joins from the east. The river then flows north to Pechora town, where the railway from Vorkuta crosses, then north to Ust-Usa where the Usa joins from the east (the Usa was once an important river route into Siberia). The Pechora then curves northwest, west, and west southwest. The Izhma joins from the south. It then flows further west to Ust-Tsilma (425 kilometres (264 mi) from the mouth) where the Pizhma joins from the southwest and the Tsilma joins from the west. Before modern times people traveled up the Tsilma and portaged to the Pyoza to reach the White Sea. Then the Pechora turns north and crosses the arctic Arctic Circle and the border of the Nenets Okrug; Pustozyorsk; Naryan-Mar, the Nenets capital and a port at the head of the Pechora delta; Pechora Bay; Pechora Sea; and finally the Barents Sea.

== Hydrology ==
The monthly average discharge of the river was recorded between 1981 and 1993 in the village of Oksino, located 141 km (88 mi) upstream from the mouth. The values are presented in the diagram below (metric units, m^{3}/s).

== Canal projects to the Kama River ==
Before the arrival of the railroad to the Pechora, an important way of travel to the region was via a portage road, from Cherdyn in the Kama basin to Yaksha on the Pechora.

A project for a Pechora–Kama Canal along the same general route was widely discussed in the 1960s through 1980s, this time not as much for transportation, but for the diversion of some of the water of the Pechora to the Kama, as part of a grand Northern river reversal scheme. However, no construction work was carried out on the route of the proposed canal, other than a triple nuclear explosion in 1971, which excavated a crater over 600 metres (2,000 ft) long.

== Literary reference ==
The Pechora was the source of the name of Pechorin – protagonist of the 1839 novel A Hero of Our Time by Mikhail Lermontov, a well-known work of Russian literature.
