= List of rural localities in the Komi Republic =

Map of Russia with the Komi Republic highlighted

This is a list of rural localities in the Komi Republic. The Komi Republic (Russian: Респу́блика Ко́ми, romanized: Respúblika Kómi; Komi: Коми Республика, romanized: Komi Respublika) is a federal subject of Russia (a republic). Its capital is the city of Syktyvkar. The population of the republic, as of the 2010 Census was 901,189.

== Argayashsky District ==
Rural localities in Argayashsky District:

- Abez

== Izhemsky District ==
Rural localities in Izhemsky District:

- Izhma

== Kortkerossky District ==
Rural localities in Kortkerossky District:

- Kortkeros

== Koygorodsky District ==
Rural localities in Koygorodsky District:

- Koygorodok

== Priluzsky District ==
Rural localities in Priluzsky District:

- Obyachevo

== Syktyvdinsky District ==
Rural localities in Syktyvdinsky District:

- Vylgort

== Sysolsky District ==
Rural localities in Sysolsky District:

- Vizinga

== Troitsko-Pechorsky District ==
Rural localities in Troitsko-Pechorsky District:

- Yaksha

== Udorsky District ==
Rural localities in Udorsky District:

- Glotovo
- Koslan

== Ust-Kulomsky District ==
Rural localities in Ust-Kulomsky District:

- Ust-Kulom

== Ust-Tsilemsky District ==
Rural localities in Ust-Tsilemsky District:

- Novy Bor
- Ust-Tsilma

== Ust-Vymsky District ==
Rural localities in Ust-Vymsky District:

- Aykino
- Ust-Vym

== Vuktyl ==
Rural localities in Vuktyl urban okrug:

- Ust-Shchuger

== See also ==
- Lists of rural localities in Russia
