= Troitsko-Pechorsk =

Troitsko-Pechorsk Троицко-Печорск
- Urban-type settlement

Other transcription(s)
  - Komi: Мылдiн
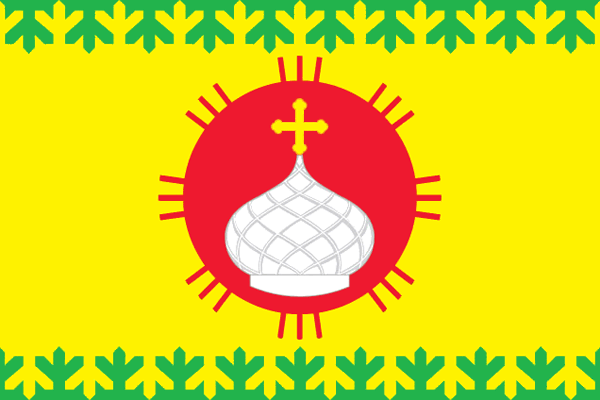
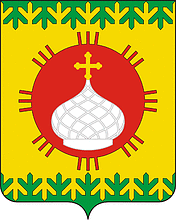
- Flag Coat of arms
- Interactive map of Troitsko-Pechorsk
- Location of Troitsko-Pechorsk Troitsko-Pechorsk (Komi Republic)
- Coordinates: 62°43′N 56°12′E
- Country: Russia
- Federal subject: Komi Republic
- Administrative district: Troitsko-Pechorsky District
- Urban-type settlement administrative territorySelsoviet: Troitsko-Pechorsk Urban-Type Settlement Administrative Territory
- Founded: 1674

Population (2010 Census)
  - Total: 7,276
  - Estimate (2025): 5,748 (−21%)

Administrative status
  - Capital of: Troitsko-Pechorsky District, Troitsko-Pechorsk Urban-Type Settlement Administrative Territory

Municipal status
  - Municipal district: Troitsko-Pechorsky Municipal District
  - Urban settlement: Troitsko-Pechorsk Urban Settlement
  - Capital of: Troitsko-Pechorsky Municipal District, Troitsko-Pechorsk Urban Settlement
- Time zone: UTC+3 (MSK)
- Postal code: 169420
- OKTMO ID: 87636151051
- Website: tradm-pos.ru

Troitsko-Pechorsk population
- 2010 Census: 7,276
- 2002 Census: 8,851
- 1989 Census: 10,704
- 1979 Census: 9,240

Troitsko-Pechorsk (Russian: Троицко-Печорск, Tróicko-Pečórsk; Komi: Мылдiн, Myldïn) is an urban locality (an urban-type settlement) and the administrative center of Troitsko-Pechorsky District of the Komi Republic, Russia, located on the Pechora River. As of the 2010 Census, its population was 7,276.

== Administrative and municipal status ==
Within the framework of administrative divisions, Troitsko-Pechorsk serves as the administrative center of Troitsko-Pechorsky District. As an administrative division, the urban-type settlement of Troitsko-Pechorsk, together with one rural locality (the village of Bolshaya Soyva), is incorporated within Troitsko-Pechorsky District as Troitsko-Pechorsk Urban-Type Settlement Administrative Territory (an administrative division of the district). As a municipal division, Troitsko-Pechorsk Urban-Type Settlement Administrative Territory is incorporated within Troitsko-Pechorsky Municipal District as Troitsko-Pechorsk Urban Settlement.

== Climate ==
Climate data for Troitsko-Pechorsk (extremes 1888-present)
Month	Jan	Feb	Mar	Apr	May	Jun	Jul	Aug	Sep	Oct	Nov	Dec	Year
Record high °C (°F)	3.7 (38.7)	3.4 (38.1)	14.0 (57.2)	24.0 (75.2)	30.5 (86.9)	34.5 (94.1)	35.4 (95.7)	34.7 (94.5)	28.8 (83.8)	22.7 (72.9)	9.4 (48.9)	3.7 (38.7)	35.4 (95.7)
Mean daily maximum °C (°F)	−12.8 (9.0)	−10.5 (13.1)	−1.9 (28.6)	5.6 (42.1)	13.5 (56.3)	19.5 (67.1)	22.8 (73.0)	18.0 (64.4)	11.8 (53.2)	3.2 (37.8)	−5.5 (22.1)	−10.5 (13.1)	4.4 (40.0)
Daily mean °C (°F)	−16.5 (2.3)	−14.7 (5.5)	−6.9 (19.6)	0.3 (32.5)	7.4 (45.3)	13.5 (56.3)	16.7 (62.1)	12.8 (55.0)	7.5 (45.5)	0.6 (33.1)	−8.3 (17.1)	−13.8 (7.2)	−0.1 (31.8)
Mean daily minimum °C (°F)	−20.5 (−4.9)	−18.7 (−1.7)	−11.5 (11.3)	−4.4 (24.1)	1.9 (35.4)	8.0 (46.4)	11.1 (52.0)	8.6 (47.5)	4.2 (39.6)	−1.8 (28.8)	−11.1 (12.0)	−17.3 (0.9)	−4.3 (24.3)
Record low °C (°F)	−42.2 (−44.0)	−39.3 (−38.7)	−33.5 (−28.3)	−22.2 (−8.0)	−7.5 (18.5)	0.6 (33.1)	5.9 (42.6)	1.0 (33.8)	−7.4 (18.7)	−23.8 (−10.8)	−33.7 (−28.7)	−39.6 (−39.3)	−42.2 (−44.0)
Average precipitation mm (inches)	39.9 (1.57)	34.7 (1.37)	35.5 (1.40)	41.2 (1.62)	56.7 (2.23)	72.2 (2.84)	67.9 (2.67)	78.8 (3.10)	63.8 (2.51)	59.8 (2.35)	51.2 (2.02)	42.8 (1.69)	644.5 (25.37)
Source: pogoda.ru.net
