= Kört-Aika Monument =

Coordinates: 61.812895°N 51.539894°E

The Kört-Aika Monument is a steel statue located at the entrance to the village of Kortkeros, Kortkerossky District, Komi Republic, Russia. It is a statue of a man pulling up several boats with his chains.

== Features ==
The Kört-Aika Monument is a steel statue that is 100 by 100 millimetres (3.9 in × 3.9 in) in height, and 80 by 80 millimetres (3.1 in × 3.1 in) in length, with the chains measured in 40 by 4 millimetres (1.57 in × 0.16 in) in length. The statue weighs around 1 tonne (2,200 lb). (Note: В Коми выковали "куй" на счастье, komi.kp.ru)

== History ==
Yuri Shagunov, president of the Russian Union of Blacksmiths, commissioned the monument's construction (Note: https://www.bnkomi.ru/data/news/56874/) to two blacksmiths, Alexander Sushnikov (from St. Petersburg) and Georgii Gorbachev (from Moscow). It was initially installed in the courtyard of a local blacksmith, Igor Usachev, before being built at the village's entrance on November 12. (Note: Сыктывкарская и Коми-Зырянская епархия: Корт айка не является объектом религиозного поклонения, komiinform.ru)

== Controversy ==
Some residents objected to the statue's existence, as they considered it to promote a revival of the native Komi religion. Furthermore, some residents also considered the statue to be a monument of a robber.

In response, the statue's creators stated that it is not a pagan monument, but a work of art. (Note: http://respublika11.ru/2016/07/18/most-iz-metalla/) (Note: http://www.mustartgallery.ru/monumental_art/85/) The local diocese of the Russian Orthodox Church also stated that the statue does not bear any religious or ideological motive. (Note: http://syktyvkar-eparchia.ru/news/pamjatnik_kort_ajke/2016-11-17-47)

== See also ==
- Komi mythology
