= Priuralsky (rural locality) =

Priuralsky (Russian: Приуральский; masculine), Priuralskaya (Приуральская; feminine), or Priuralskoye (Приуральское; neuter) is the name of several rural localities in Russia:

- Priuralsky, Komi Republic, a settlement in Priuralsky Rural-Type Settlement Administrative Territory of Troitsko-Pechorsky District of the Komi Republic
- Priuralsky, Orenburg Oblast, a settlement in Priuralsky Selsoviet of Orenburgsky District of Orenburg Oblast
- Priuralskoye, a selo in Priuralskoye Selo Administrative Territory under the administrative jurisdiction of the town of republic significance of Pechora in the Komi Republic

== See also ==
- Uralsk
