= Priuralsky =

Priuralsky (masculine), Priuralskaya (feminine), or Priuralskoye (neuter) may refer to:

- Priuralsky District, a district of Yamalo-Nenets Autonomous Okrug, Russia
- Priuralsky (rural locality) (Priuralskaya, Priuralskoye), several rural localities in Russia
