= Kortkeros =

Rural locality in the Komi Republic, Russia

Kortkeros Корткерос
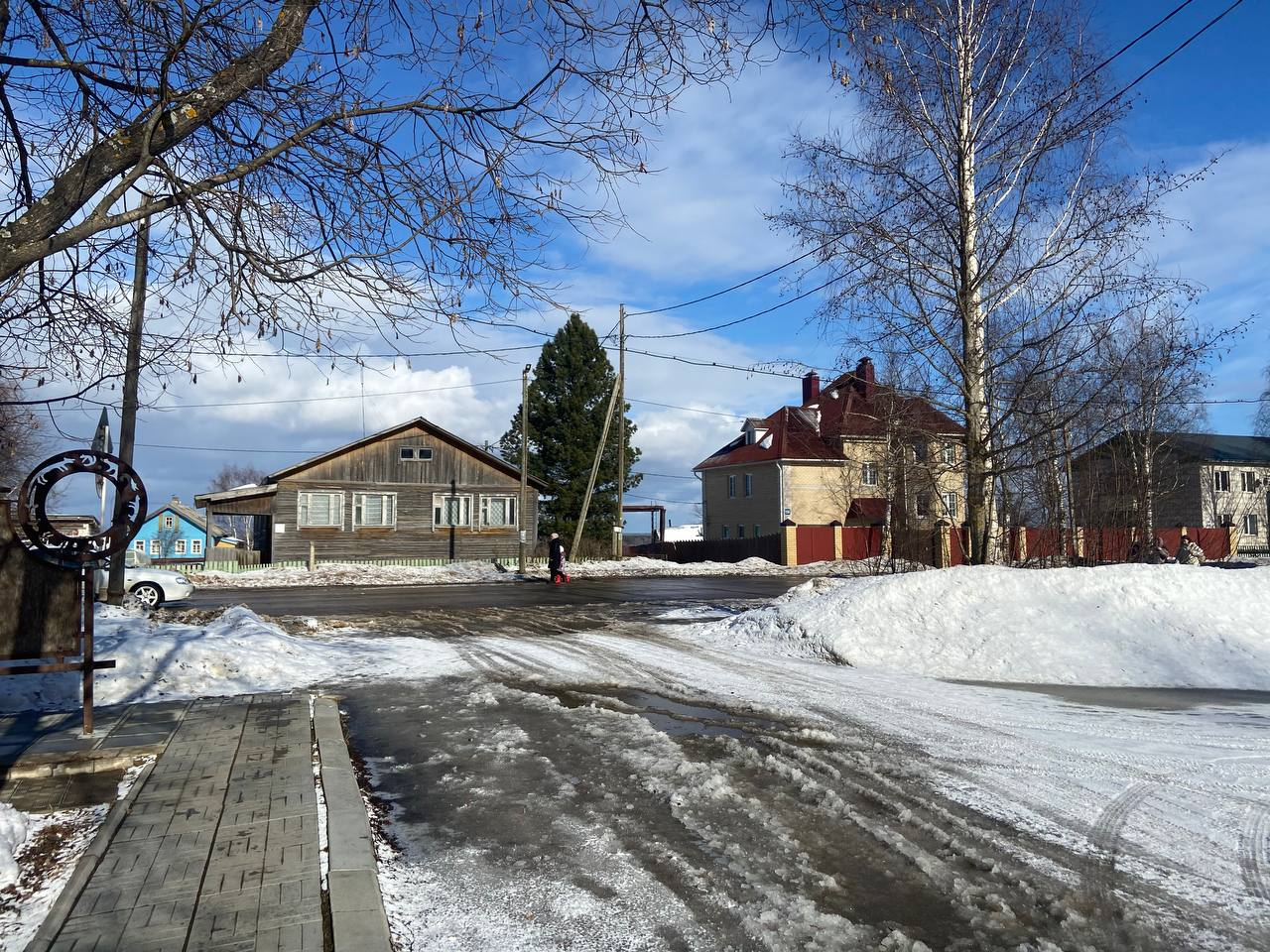
- Interactive map of Kortkeros
- Location of Kortkeros Kortkeros (Komi Republic)
- Coordinates: 61°48′13″N 51°34′37″E
- Country: Russia
- Federal subject: Komi Republic

Population
  - Estimate (2021): 4,710 )
- Time zone: UTC+3 (MSK)
- Postal code: 168020
- OKTMO ID: 87616430101

Kortkeros (Russian: Корткерос, Komi: Кӧрткерӧс, Körtkerös) is a rural locality (a selo) and the administrative center of Kortkerossky District of the Komi Republic, Russia. Population: 4,624 (2010 census); 4,659 (2002 census); 4,373 (1989 Soviet census).
