= Seven Wonders of Russia =

List from Russian newspaper

The Seven Wonders of Russia as determined by a project organized by the newspaper Izvestia, Radio Mayak, and the television channel Russia. The competition took place in three stages from 1 October 2007 through 1 June 2008, with the final results declared in Moscow's Red Square on 12 June 2008.

== Seven Wonders of Russia ==
#	Name	Location	Image
1	Lake Baikal	Irkutsk Oblast, Buryatia	
2	Valley of Geysers	Kamchatka Krai	
3	Mamayev Kurgan	Volgograd Oblast	
4	Peterhof	Saint Petersburg	
5	Saint Basil's Cathedral	Moscow	
6	Manpupuner rock formations	Komi Republic	
7	Mount Elbrus	Kabardino-Balkaria, Karachay–Cherkessia	

== See also ==
- Wonders of the World (disambiguation)
- Wonders of the World
- Seven Natural Wonders of Ukraine
