= Novy Bor =

Novy Bor Новый Бор
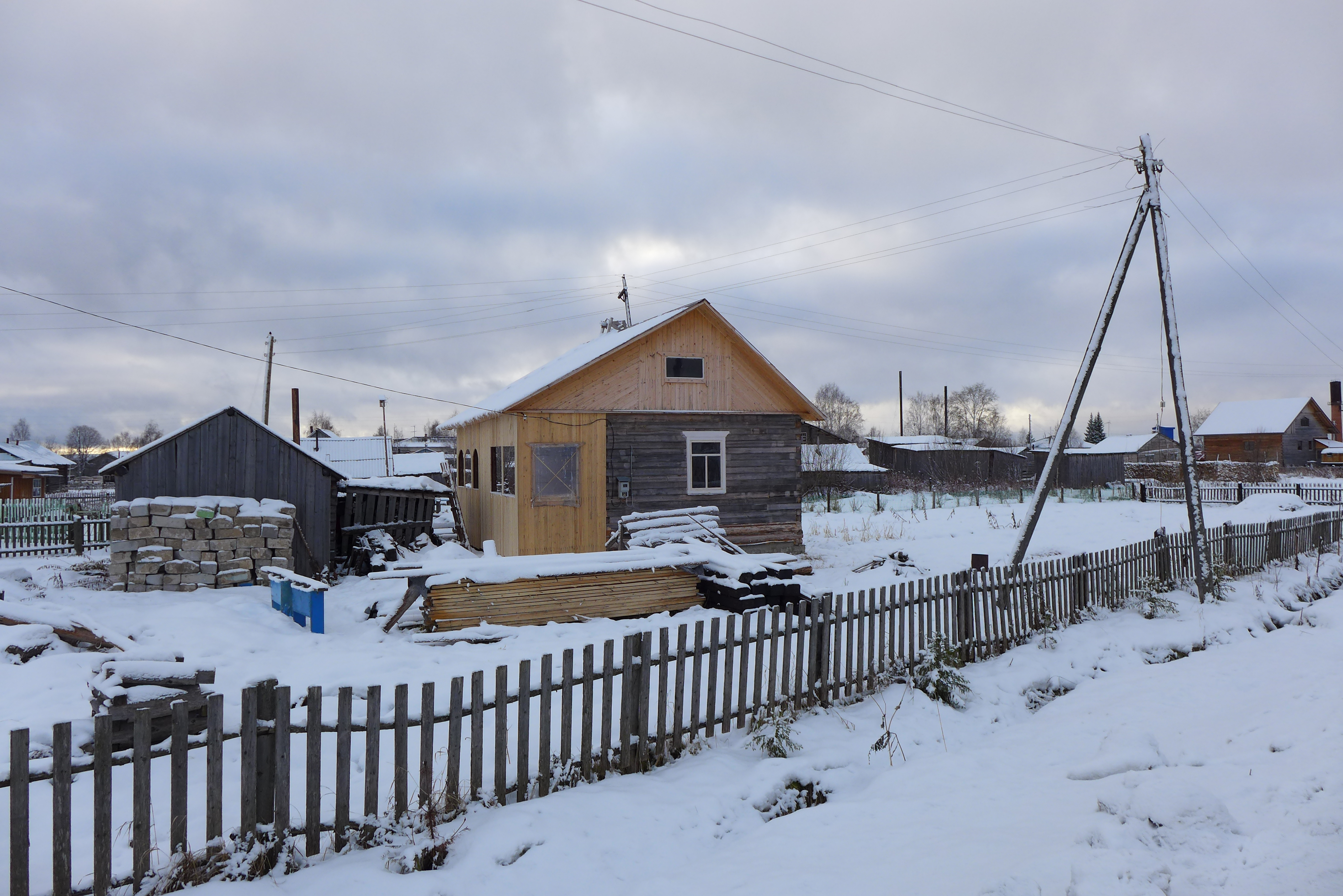
- Interactive map of Novy Bor
- Location of Novy Bor Novy Bor (Komi Republic)
- Coordinates: 66°43′07″N 52°18′40″E
- Country: Russia
- Federal subject: Komi Republic
- Founded: 1908
- Elevation: 22 m (72 ft)

Population
  - Estimate (2021): 672 )
- Time zone: UTC+3 (MSK)
- Postal code: 169495
- OKTMO ID: 87652425101

Novy Bor (Russian: Но́вый Бор) is a settlement in the Komi Republic, Russia, located near the border of the republic on the shores of the Pechora River. In 2010 it had a population of 722 people.
