= Vizinga =

Rural locality in the Komi Republic, Russia

Vizinga Визинга
- Interactive map of Vizinga
- Location of Vizinga Vizinga (Komi Republic)
- Coordinates: 61°04′30″N 50°06′11″E
- Country: Russia
- Federal subject: Komi Republic
- Founded: 1585

Population
  - Estimate (2021): 6,353 )
- Time zone: UTC+3 (MSK)
- Postal code: 168100
- OKTMO ID: 87632410101

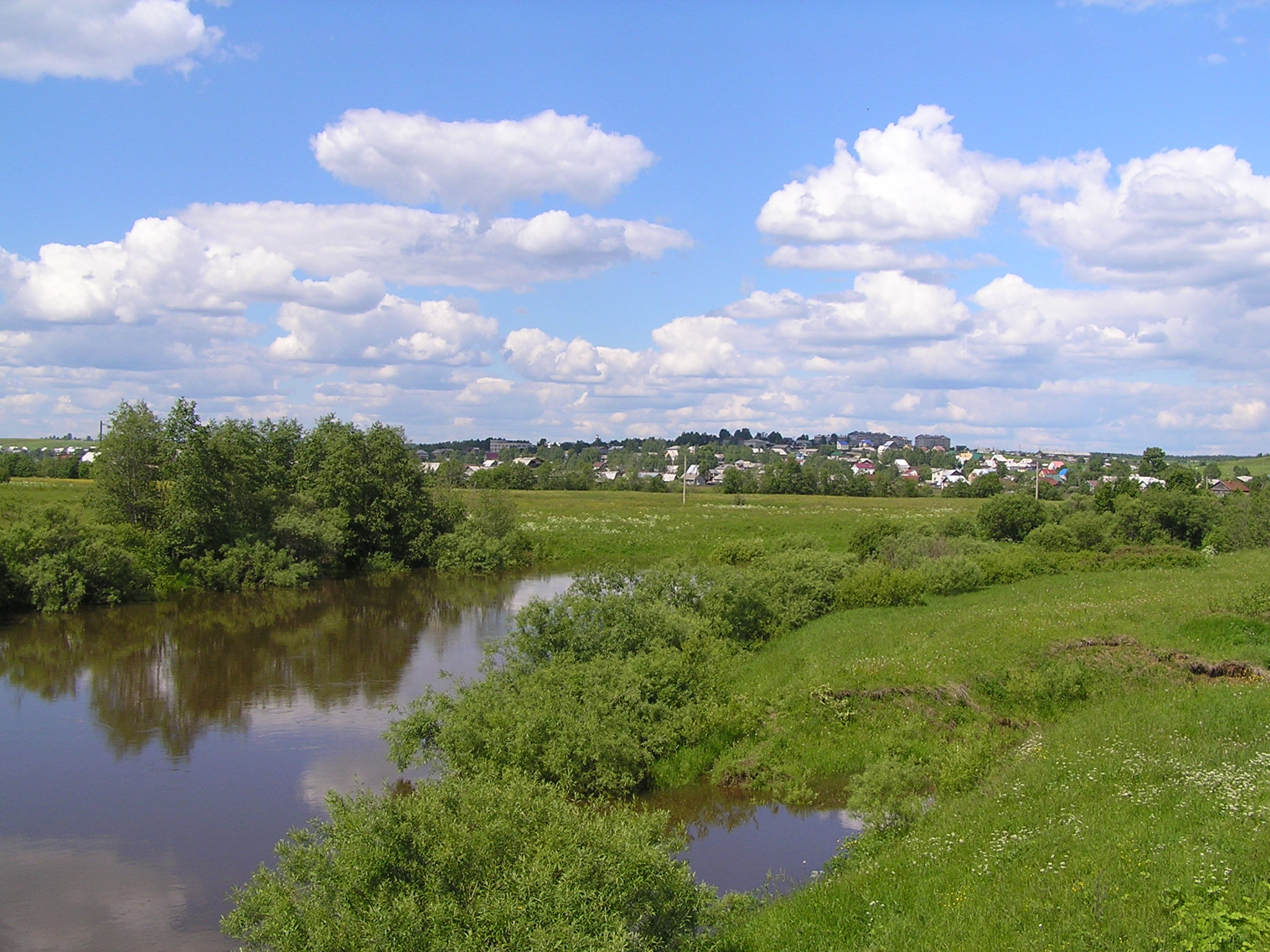
Village of Vizinga

Vizinga (Russian: Визинга, Komi: Визин, Vizin) is a rural locality (a selo) and the administrative center of Sysolsky District of the Komi Republic, Russia. Population: 6,810 (2010 census); 7,140 (2002 census); 7,014 (1989 Soviet census).
