= Koygorodok =

Rural locality in the Komi Republic, Russia

Koygorodok Койгородок
- Interactive map of Koygorodok
- Location of Koygorodok Koygorodok (Komi Republic)
- Coordinates: 60°27′33″N 51°00′37″E
- Country: Russia
- Federal subject: Komi Republic

Population
  - Estimate (2025): 2,951 )
- Time zone: UTC+3 (MSK)
- Postal code: 168170
- OKTMO ID: 87612420101

Koygorodok (Russian: Койгородок, Komi: Койгорт, Kojgort) is a rural locality (a selo) and the administrative center of Koygorodsky District of the Komi Republic, Russia. Population: 2,940 (2010 census); 3,076 (2002 census); 2,923 (1989 Soviet census).

== Geography ==
=== Climate ===
Climate data for Koygorodok
Month	Jan	Feb	Mar	Apr	May	Jun	Jul	Aug	Sep	Oct	Nov	Dec	Year
Record high °C (°F)	3.4 (38.1)	6.1 (43.0)	14.6 (58.3)	26.0 (78.8)	32.7 (90.9)	34.7 (94.5)	37.0 (98.6)	35.8 (96.4)	27.8 (82.0)	21.5 (70.7)	10.9 (51.6)	6.4 (43.5)	37.0 (98.6)
Mean daily maximum °C (°F)	−9.7 (14.5)	−7.4 (18.7)	0.0 (32.0)	8.3 (46.9)	16.4 (61.5)	21.2 (70.2)	23.8 (74.8)	19.8 (67.6)	13.6 (56.5)	5.0 (41.0)	−3.2 (26.2)	−8.0 (17.6)	6.6 (44.0)
Daily mean °C (°F)	−13.4 (7.9)	−12.1 (10.2)	−5.3 (22.5)	2.4 (36.3)	9.6 (49.3)	14.9 (58.8)	17.6 (63.7)	14.1 (57.4)	8.8 (47.8)	2.1 (35.8)	−5.7 (21.7)	−10.9 (12.4)	1.8 (35.3)
Mean daily minimum °C (°F)	−17.3 (0.9)	−16.6 (2.1)	−10.4 (13.3)	−2.9 (26.8)	3.3 (37.9)	8.7 (47.7)	11.3 (52.3)	9.1 (48.4)	4.8 (40.6)	−0.3 (31.5)	−8.4 (16.9)	−14.2 (6.4)	−2.7 (27.1)
Record low °C (°F)	−47.8 (−54.0)	−47.4 (−53.3)	−42.0 (−43.6)	−30.1 (−22.2)	−13.9 (7.0)	−5.5 (22.1)	−0.6 (30.9)	−4.5 (23.9)	−8.0 (17.6)	−23.0 (−9.4)	−40.5 (−40.9)	−51.4 (−60.5)	−51.4 (−60.5)
Average precipitation mm (inches)	40 (1.6)	31 (1.2)	34 (1.3)	34 (1.3)	55 (2.2)	82 (3.2)	68 (2.7)	85 (3.3)	60 (2.4)	59 (2.3)	49 (1.9)	43 (1.7)	640 (25.1)
Source: www.pogodaiklimat.ru
