= Obyachevo =

Rural locality in the Komi Republic, Russia

Obyachevo Объячево
- Interactive map of Obyachevo
- Location of Obyachevo Obyachevo (Komi Republic)
- Coordinates: 60°20′19″N 49°36′33″E
- Country: Russia
- Federal subject: Komi Republic

Population
  - Estimate (2021): 5,617 )
- Time zone: UTC+3 (MSK)
- Postal code: 168130
- OKTMO ID: 87624445101

Obyachevo (Russian: Объячево, Komi: Абъячой, Abjaćoj) is a rural locality (a selo) and the administrative center of Priluzsky District of the Komi Republic, Russia. Population: 5,699 (2010 census); 5,835 (2002 census); 5,273 (1989 Soviet census).
