= Yaregskoye oil field =

Oil field in Komi Republic, Russia

Yaregskoye Oil Field
- Location within Komi Republic Location within Russia
- Country: Russia
- Region: Komi Republic
- Offshore/onshore: onshore
- Coordinates: 63.35°N 53.632°E
- Operator: Lukoil

Field history
- Discovery: 1994
- Start of production: 2011

Production
- Estimated oil in place: 42.7 million tonnes (~ 50.6×10^{6} m^{3} or 318 million bbl)

The Yaregskoye oil field is an oil field located in Komi Republic. It was discovered in 1994 and developed by Lukoil. The oil field is operated and owned by Lukoil. The total proven reserves of the Yaregskoye oil field are around 318 million barrels (42.7 million tonnes), and production is centered on 10,000 barrels per day (1,600 m^{3}/d).

== See also ==
- Petroleum industry in Russia
