= Manpupuner rock formations =

Rock formations, Russia

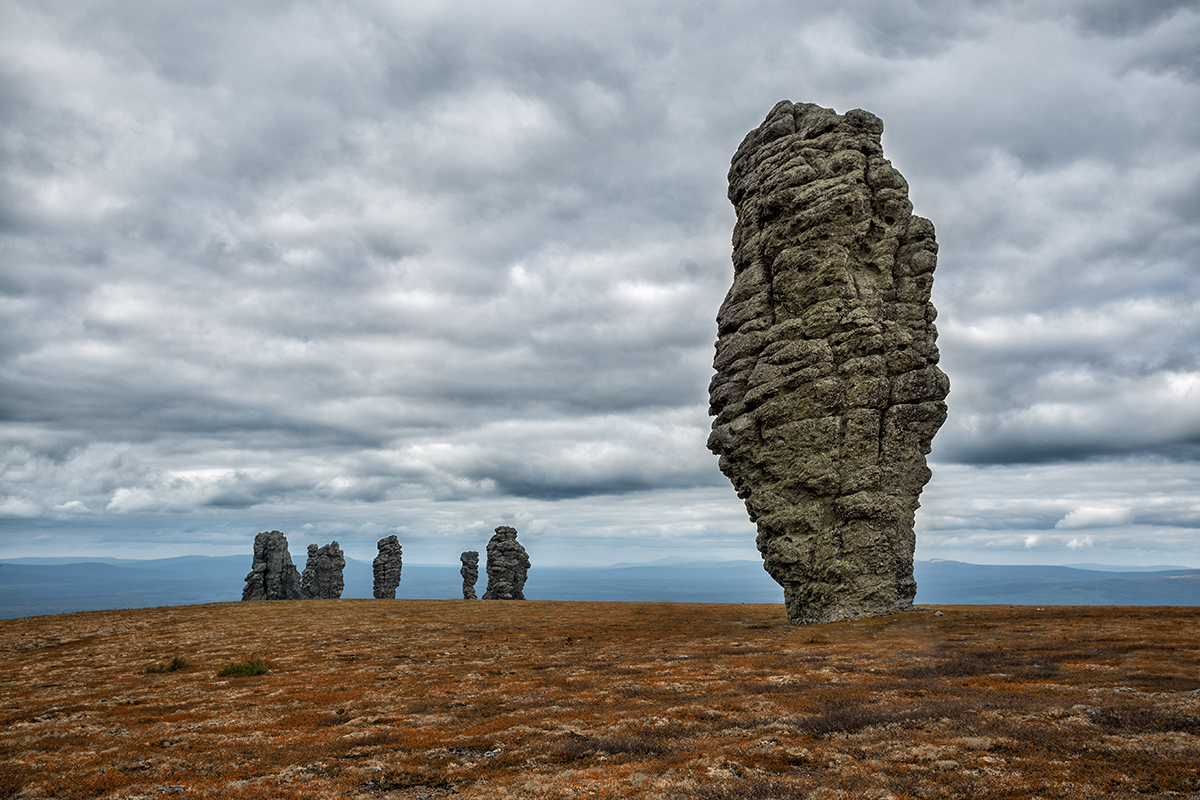
- Manpupuner rock formations

Highest point
- Prominence: 98–138 ft (30–42 m)
- Coordinates: 62°15′28″N 59°17′53″E

Geography
- Location: Troitsko-Pechorsky District, Komi Republic, Russia

Geology
- Rock age: 200 million years

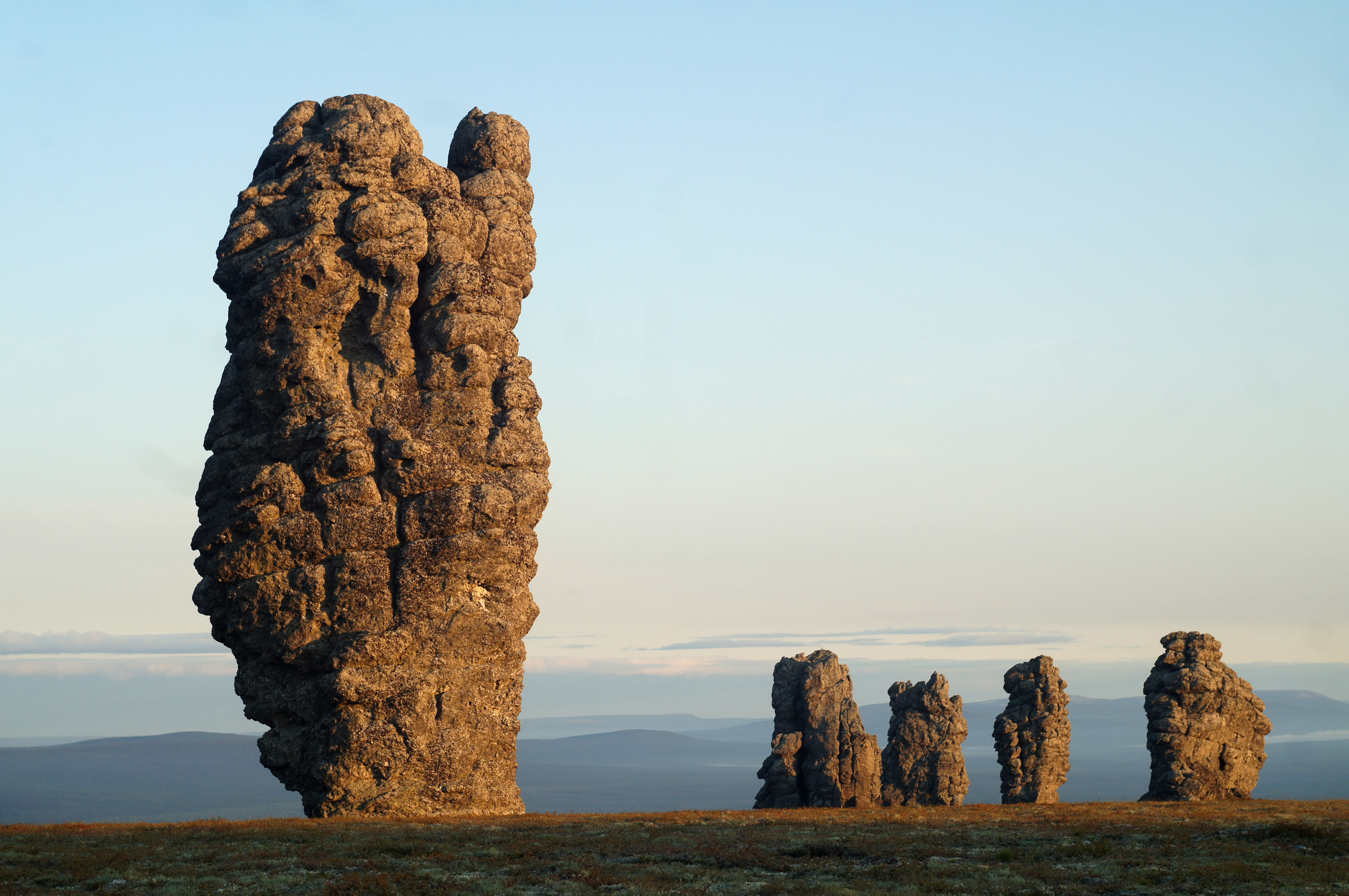
The Manpupuner rock formations

The Manpupuner rock formations (Man-Pupu-Nyor; Mansi: Мань-Пупыг-Нёр Mansi pronunciation: [manʲ.pupiɣ noːr], literally "Small Idol Mountain"; Komi: Болвано-Из Komi pronunciation: [bolvano iz], literally "Idol Stone") are a set of 7 stone pillars located west of the Ural Mountains in the Troitsko-Pechorsky District of the Komi Republic. They are located on the territory of the Pechoro-Ilychski Reserve on the mountain Man-Pupu-nyor, between the Ilych and Pechora rivers. They are also known as the Seven Strong Men Rock Formations and the Poles of the Komi Republic. Deemed one of the Seven Wonders of Russia, the Manpupuner rock formations are a popular attraction in Russia, though relatively unspoiled by tourism.

== Description ==
The height of the rocks varies between 30 and 42 metres. About 200 million years ago at the location of the stone pillars, there were high mountains. Rain, snow, wind, frost and heat gradually eroded the mountains. Solid sericite-quartzite schists, from which the remains are composed, were more resistant to erosion and survive today while softer rocks were destroyed by weathering and carried by water and wind into depressions.

One pillar, 34 meters high, stands somewhat apart from the others. It resembles an inverted bottle. Six others lie at the edge of the cliff. The pillars are said to resemble the figures of a huge man or the head of a horse or ram. There are numerous legends associated with Manpupuner. The formations were once considered sacred by the local Mansi people and climbing them was regarded as a sin.

== Fauna ==
In the vicinity of the plateau, there are viviparous lizards, squirrels, martens, sables, otters, stoats, American minks, brown bears, wolverines, and foxes.

== Tourism ==
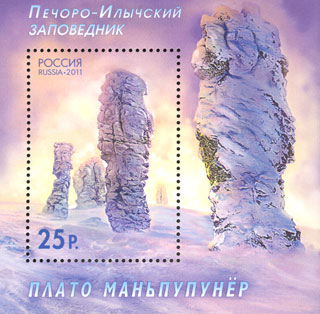
Russian stamp depicting the Manpupuner rock formations

The formations can be accessed by road from the Komi Republic, hiking or skiing over the Dyatlov Pass from the Sverdlovsk region, or helicopter. Until 2004, a car route from the Sverdlovsk Region was allowed, with a visit to the Dyatlov Pass, the Otorten Mountain and the source of the Pechora River. It was officially banned by two protected areas along which the route lies - the Pechoro-Ilychsky Reserve and the Ivdelsky Reserve.

== See also ==
- Butte
