= Glotovo =

Glotovo Russian: Глотово
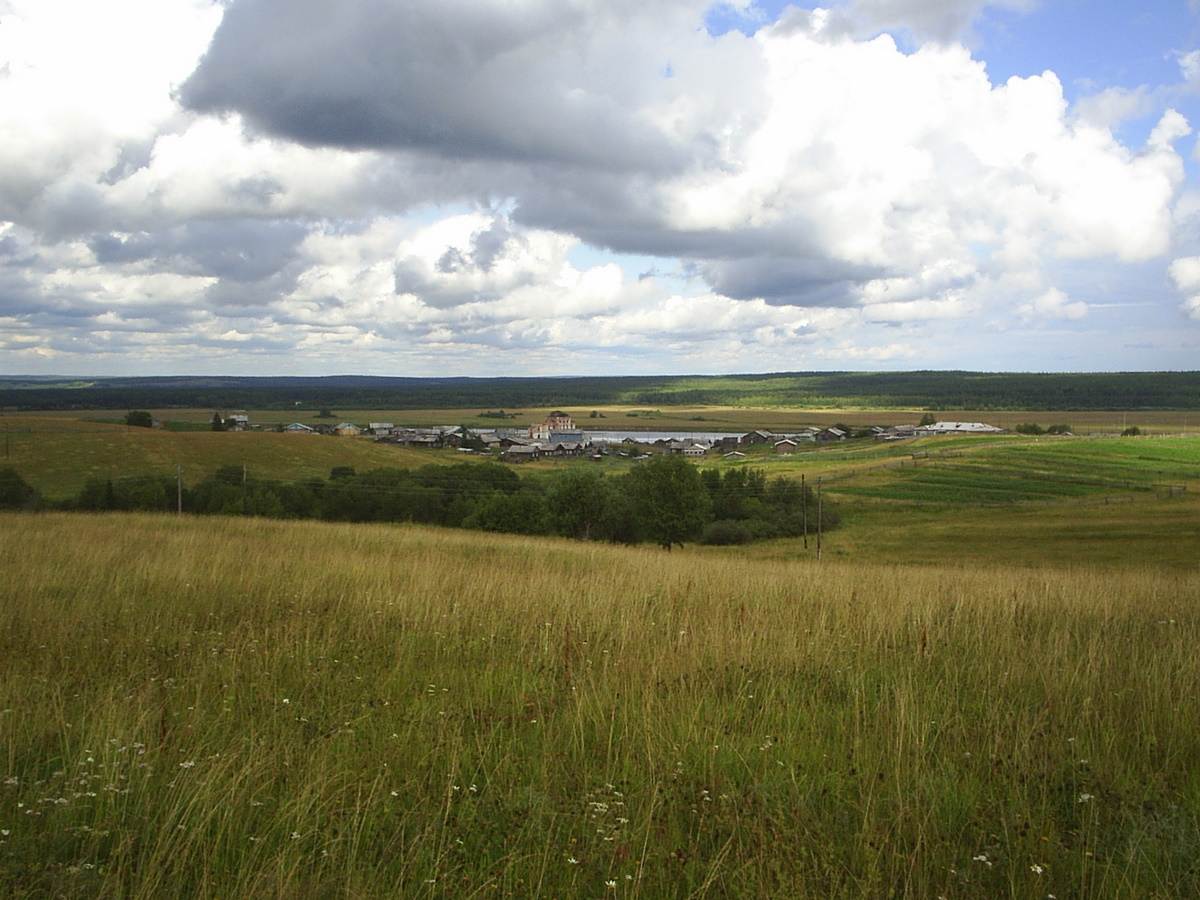
- View of Glotovo
- Interactive map of Glotovo
- Location of Glotovo Glotovo (Komi Republic)
- Coordinates: 63°28′43″N 49°28′46″E
- Country: Russia
- Federal subject: Komi Republic
- Elevation: 125 m (410 ft)

Population
  - Estimate (2021): 216 )
- Time zone: UTC+3 (MSK)
- Postal code: 169265
- OKTMO ID: 87640415101

Glotovo (Russian: Гло́тово; Komi: Слӧбӧда, Slöböda) is a village in the Komi Republic, Russia, located on the Mezen River.
