= Ust-Kulom =

Rural locality in the Komi Republic, Russia

Ust-Kulom Усть-Кулом
- Interactive map of Ust-Kulom
- Location of Ust-Kulom Ust-Kulom (Komi Republic)
- Coordinates: 61°41′17″N 53°41′27″E
- Country: Russia
- Federal subject: Komi Republic
- Founded: 1638

Population
  - Estimate (2021): 5,077 )
- Time zone: UTC+3 (MSK)
- Postal code: 168060
- OKTMO ID: 87648485101

Ust-Kulom (Russian: Усть-Кулом, Komi: Кулӧмдін, Kulömdïn) is a rural locality (a selo) and the administrative center of Ust-Kulomsky District of the Komi Republic, Russia. Population: 5,141 (2010 census); 5,475 (2002 census); 5,888 (1989 Soviet census).
