= Koygorodsky District =

Koygorodsky District Койгородский район (Russian)
- District

Other transcription(s)
  - Komi: Койгорт район
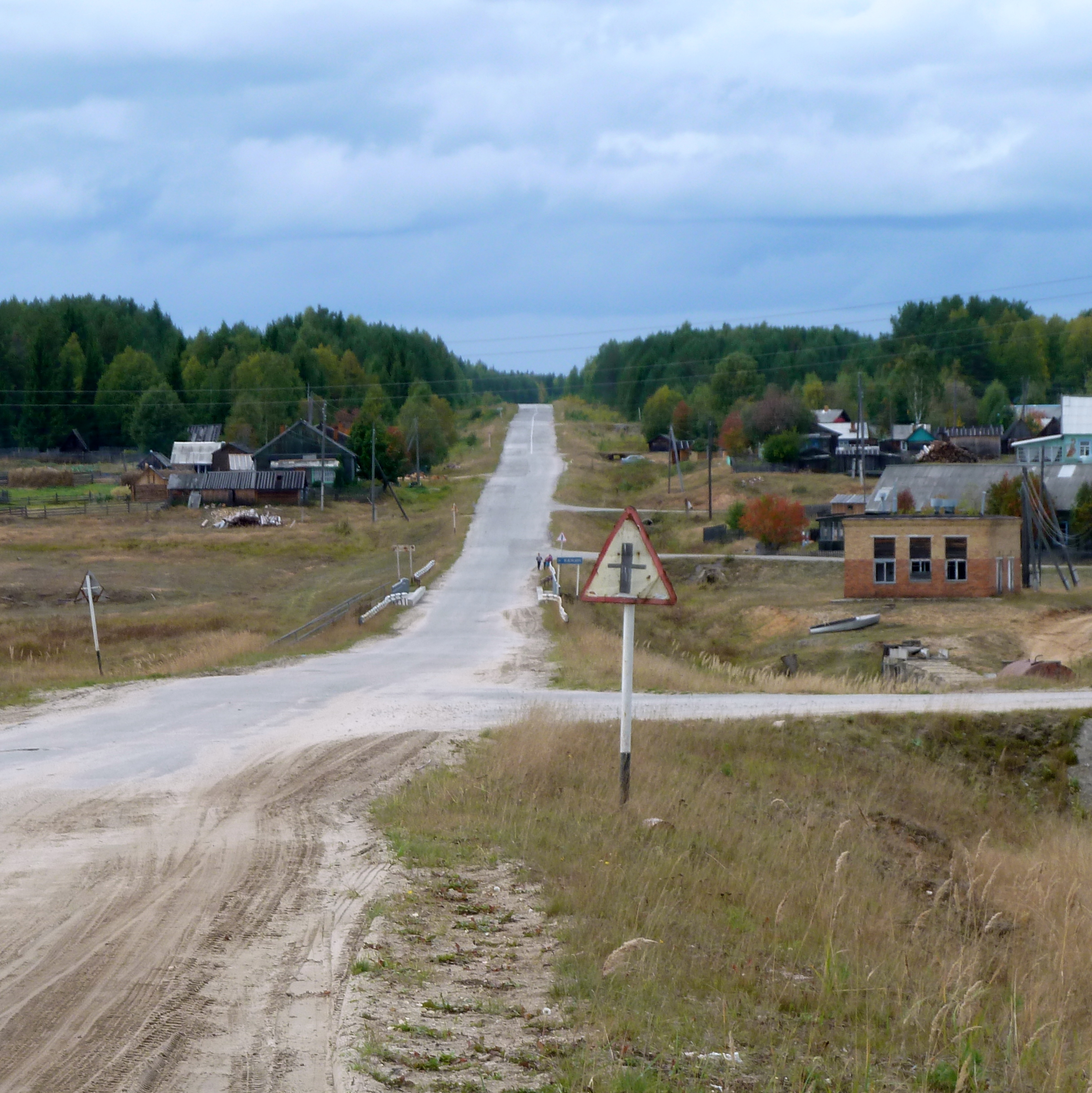
- Kazhym, in Koygorodsky District

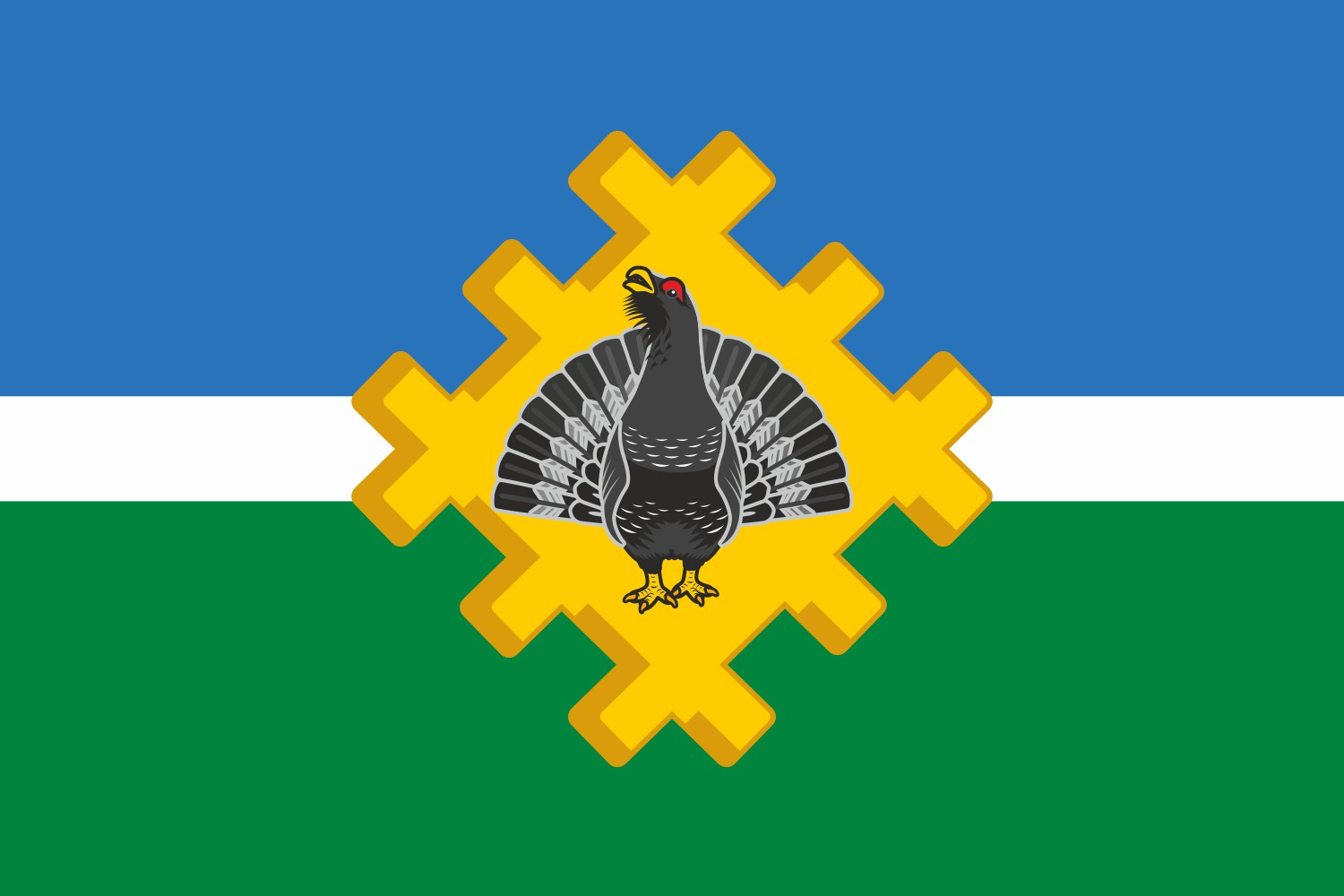
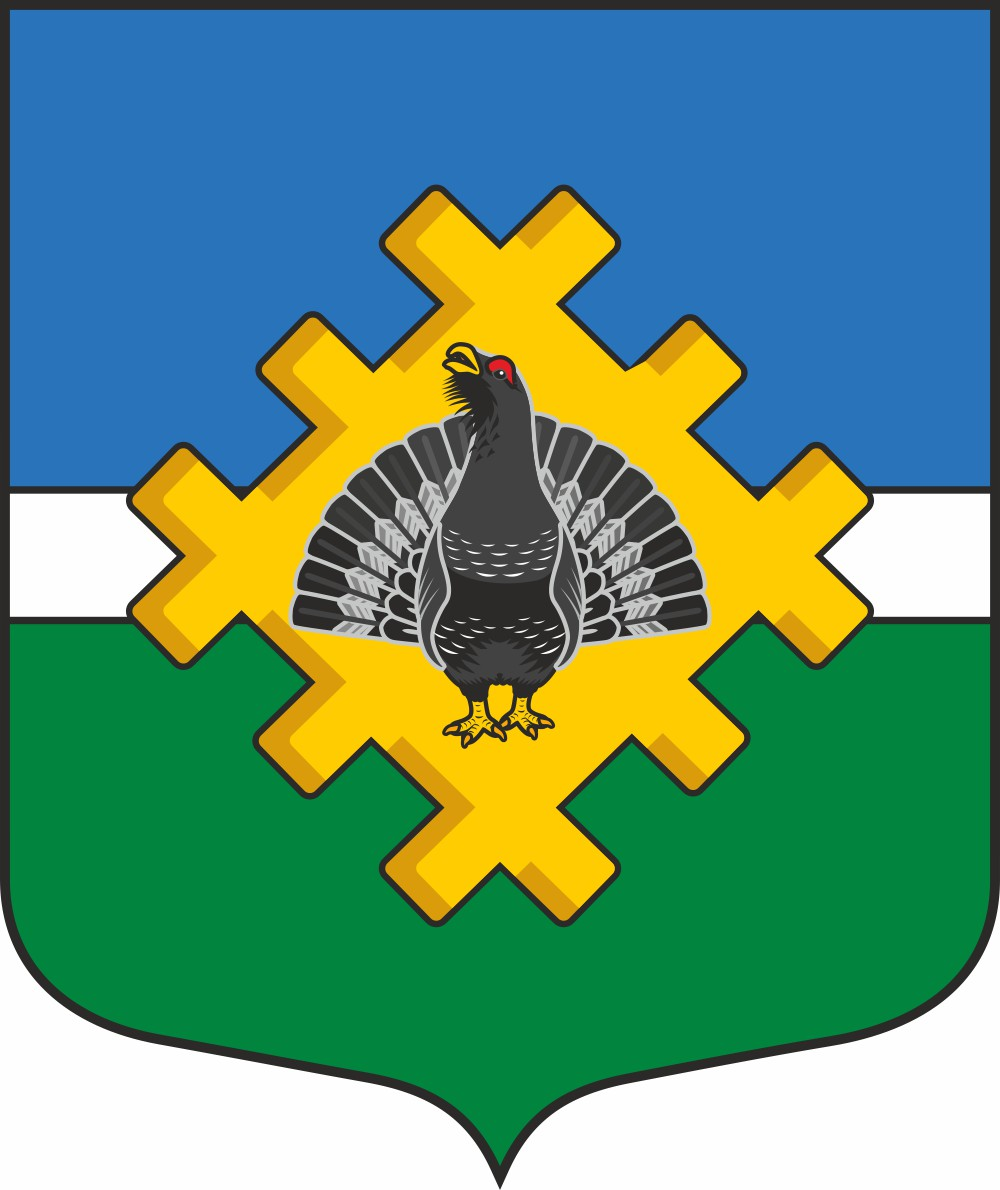
- Flag Coat of arms
- Location of Koygorodsky District in the Komi Republic
- Coordinates: 60°28′N 51°01′E
- Country: Russia
- Federal subject: Komi Republic
- Established: 1949
- Administrative center: Koygorodok

Area
  - Total: 10,416 km^{2} (4,022 sq mi)

Population (2010 Census)
  - Total: 8,431
  - Density: 0.8094/km^{2} (2.096/sq mi)
  - Urban: 0%
  - Rural: 100%

Administrative structure
  - Administrative divisions: 3 selo administrative territories, 7 settlement administrative territories
  - Inhabited localities: 21 rural localities

Municipal structure
  - Municipally incorporated as: Koygorodsky Municipal District
  - Municipal divisions: 0 urban settlements, 10 rural settlements
- Time zone: UTC+3 (MSK)
- OKTMO ID: 87612000
- Website: http://kojgorodok.ru/

Population of Koygorodsky District
- 2010 Census: 8,431
- 2002 Census: 10,020
- 1989 Census: 12,541
- 1979 Census: 15,053

Koygorodsky District (Russian: Койгородский райо́н; Komi: Койгорт район, Kojgort rajon) is an administrative district (raion), one of the twelve in the Komi Republic, Russia. It is located in the south of the republic. The area of the district is 10,416 square kilometers (4,022 sq mi). Its administrative center is the rural locality (a selo) of Koygorodok. As of the 2010 Census, the total population of the district was 8,431, with the population of Koygorodok accounting for 34.9% of that number.

== Administrative and municipal status ==
Within the framework of administrative divisions, Koygorodsky District is one of the twelve in the Komi Republic. The district is divided into three selo administrative territories and seven settlement administrative territories, which comprise twenty-one rural localities. As a municipal division, the district is incorporated as Koygorodsky Municipal District. Its ten administrative territories are incorporated as ten rural settlements within the municipal district. The selo of Koygorodok serves as the administrative center of both the administrative and municipal district.
