= Sysolsky District =

Sysolsky District Сысольский район (Russian)
- District

Other transcription(s)
  - Komi: Сыктыв район
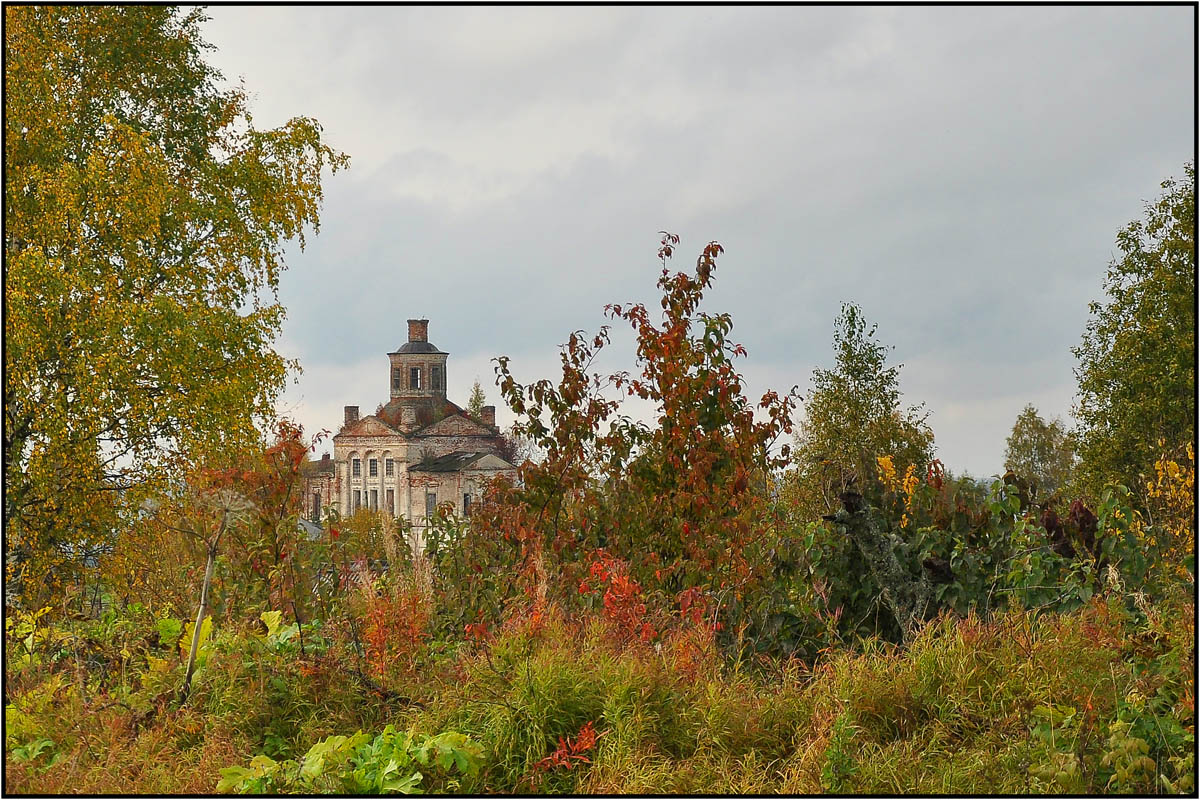
- Church of the Nativity, village Vyotcha, Sysolsky District

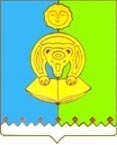
- Coat of arms
- Location of Sysolsky District in the Komi Republic
- Coordinates: 61°05′N 50°05′E
- Country: Russia
- Federal subject: Komi Republic
- Established: 15 July 1929
- Administrative center: Vizinga

Area
  - Total: 6,140 km^{2} (2,370 sq mi)

Population (2010 Census)
  - Total: 13,956
  - Density: 2.27/km^{2} (5.89/sq mi)
  - Urban: 0%
  - Rural: 100%

Administrative structure
  - Administrative divisions: 9 selo administrative territories, 2 settlement administrative territories
  - Inhabited localities: 79 rural localities

Municipal structure
  - Municipally incorporated as: Sysolsky Municipal District
  - Municipal divisions: 0 urban settlements, 11 rural settlements
- Time zone: UTC+3 (MSK)
- OKTMO ID: 87632000
- Website: http://сысола-адм.рф

Population of Sysolsky District
- 2010 Census: 13,956
- 2002 Census: 16,894
- 1989 Census: 19,568
- 1979 Census: 19,551

Sysolsky District (Russian: Сысольский райо́н; Komi: Сыктыв район, Syktyv rajon) is an administrative district (raion), one of the twelve in the Komi Republic, Russia. It is located in the south of the republic. The area of the district is 6,140 square kilometers (2,370 sq mi). Its administrative center is the rural locality (a selo) of Vizinga. As of the 2010 Census, the total population of the district was 13,956, with the population of Vizinga accounting for 48.8% of that number.

== Administrative and municipal status ==
Within the framework of administrative divisions, Sysolsky District is one of the twelve in the Komi Republic. The district is divided into nine selo administrative territories and two settlement administrative territories, which comprise seventy-nine rural localities. As a municipal division, the district is incorporated as Sysolsky Municipal District. Its eleven administrative territories are incorporated as eleven rural settlements within the municipal district. The selo of Vizinga serves as the administrative center of both the administrative and municipal district.
