= Ust-Kulomsky District =

Ust-Kulomsky District Усть-Куломский район (Russian)
- District

Other transcription(s)
  - Komi: Кулӧмдiн район
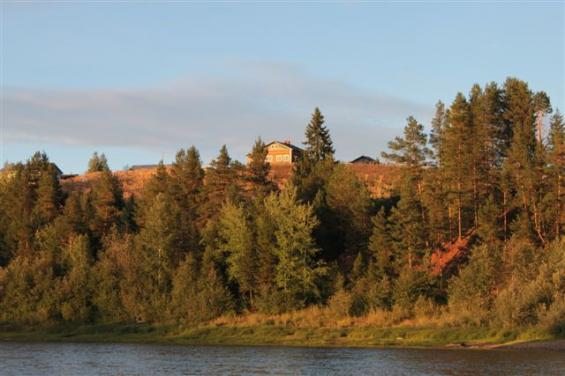
- Near the selo of Kuzhba in Ust-Kulomsky District

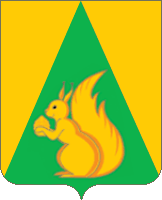
- Coat of arms
- Location of Ust-Kulomsky District in the Komi Republic
- Coordinates: 61°41′N 53°40′E
- Country: Russia
- Federal subject: Komi Republic
- Established: 1929
- Administrative center: Ust-Kulom

Area
  - Total: 26,400 km^{2} (10,200 sq mi)

Population (2010 Census)=
  - Total: 26,858
  - Density: 1.02/km^{2} (2.63/sq mi)
  - Urban: 0%
  - Rural: 100%

Administrative structure
  - Administrative divisions: 16 Selo administrative territories, 6 Settlement administrative territories
  - Inhabited localities: 63 rural localities

Municipal structure
  - Municipally incorporated as: Ust-Kulomsky Municipal District
  - Municipal divisions: 0 urban settlements, 22 rural settlements
- Time zone: UTC+3 (MSK)
- OKTMO ID: 87648000
- Website: http://усть-кулом.рф

Population of Ust-Kulomsky District
- 2010 Census: 26,858
- 2002 Census: 32,146
- 1989 Census: 40,145
- 1979 Census: 39,898

Ust-Kulomsky District (Russian: Усть-Куломский райо́н; Komi: Кулӧмдiн район, Kulömdïn rajon) is an administrative district (raion), one of the twelve in the Komi Republic, Russia. It is located in the south of the republic. The area of the district is 26,400 square kilometers (10,200 sq mi). Its administrative center is the rural locality (a selo) of Ust-Kulom. As of the 2010 Census, the total population of the district was 26,858, with the population of Ust-Kulom accounting for 19.1% of that number.

== Administrative and municipal status ==
Within the framework of administrative divisions, Ust-Kulomsky District is one of the twelve in the Komi Republic. The district is divided into sixteen selo administrative territories and six settlement administrative territories, which comprise sixty-three rural localities. As a municipal division, the district is incorporated as Ust-Kulomsky Municipal District. Its twenty-two administrative territories are incorporated as twenty-two rural settlements within the municipal district. The selo of Ust-Kulom serves as the administrative center of both the administrative and municipal district.
