= Priluzsky District =

Priluzsky District Прилузский район (Russian)
- District

Other transcription(s)
  - Komi: Луздор район
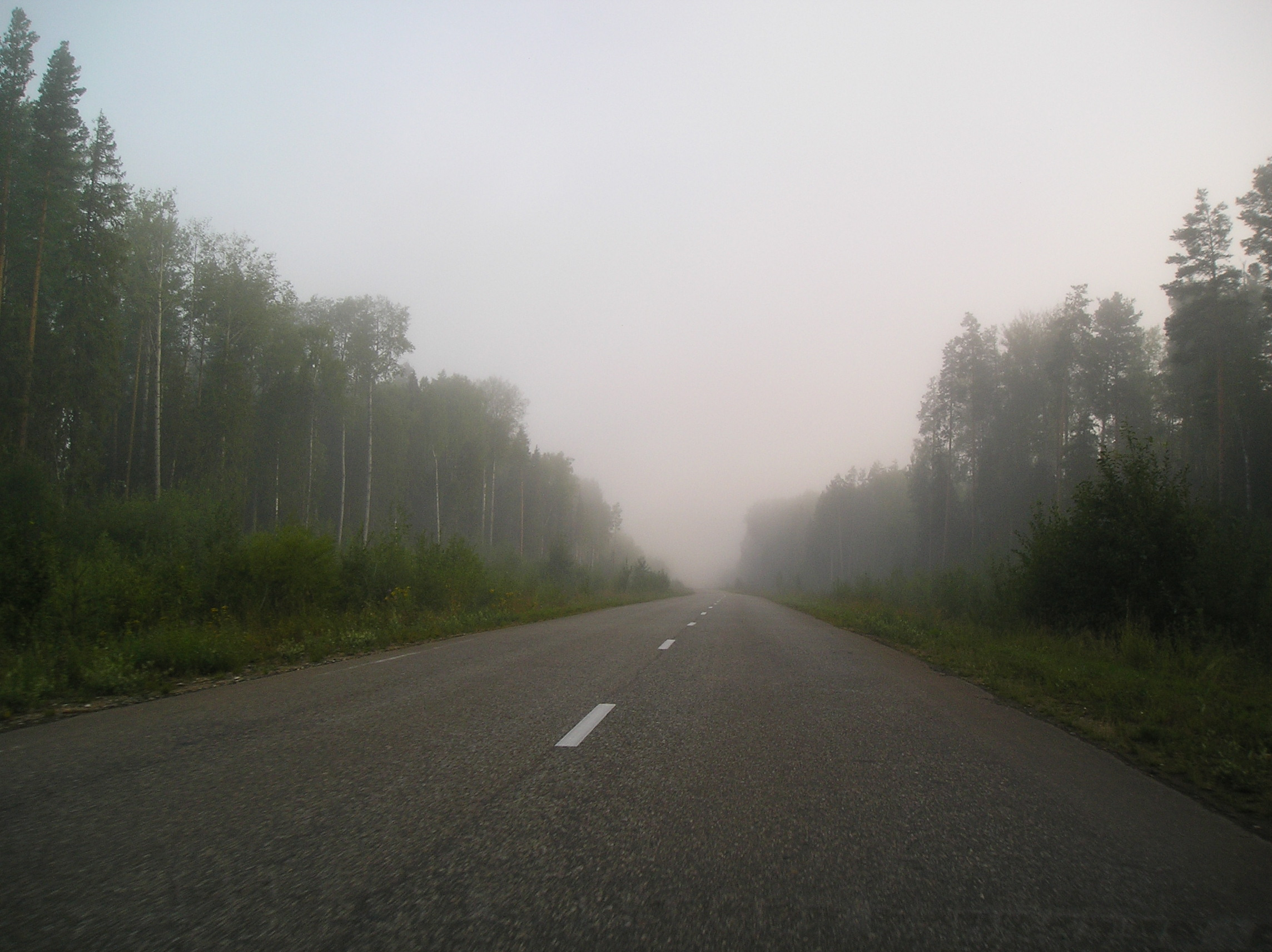

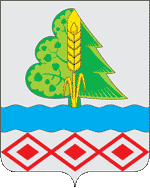
- Coat of arms
- Location of Priluzsky District in the Komi Republic
- Coordinates: 60°20′N 49°37′E
- Country: Russia
- Federal subject: Komi Republic
- Established: 15 July 1929
- Administrative center: Obyachevo

Area
  - Total: 13,168 km^{2} (5,084 sq mi)

Population (2010 Census)
  - Total: 20,737
  - Density: 1.5748/km^{2} (4.0787/sq mi)
  - Urban: 0%
  - Rural: 100%

Administrative structure
  - Administrative divisions: 14 selo administrative territories, 2 settlement administrative territories
  - Inhabited localities: 88 rural localities

Municipal structure
  - Municipally incorporated as: Priluzsky Municipal District
  - Municipal divisions: 0 urban settlements, 16 rural settlements
- Time zone: UTC+3 (MSK)
- OKTMO ID: 87624000
- Website: http://www.priluzie.ru

Population of Priluzsky District
- 2010 Census: 20,737
- 2002 Census: 24,762
- 1989 Census: 28,674
- 1979 Census: 30,526

Priluzsky District (Russian: Прилузский райо́н; Komi: Луздор район, Luzdor rajon) is an administrative district (raion), one of the twelve in the Komi Republic, Russia. It is located in the south of the republic. The area of the district is 13,168 square kilometers (5,084 sq mi). Its administrative center is the rural locality (a selo) of Obyachevo. As of the 2010 Census, the total population of the district was 20,737, with the population of Obyachevo accounting for 27.5% of that number.

== Administrative and municipal status ==
Within the framework of administrative divisions, Priluzsky District is one of the twelve in the Komi Republic. The district is divided into fourteen selo administrative territories and two settlement administrative territories, which comprise eighty-eight rural localities. As a municipal division, the district is incorporated as Priluzsky Municipal District. Its sixteen administrative territories are incorporated as sixteen rural settlements within the municipal district. The selo of Obyachevo serves as the administrative center of both the administrative and municipal district.
