= Kortkerossky District =

Kortkerossky District Корткеросский район (Russian)
- District

Other transcription(s)
  - Komi: Кӧрткерӧс район
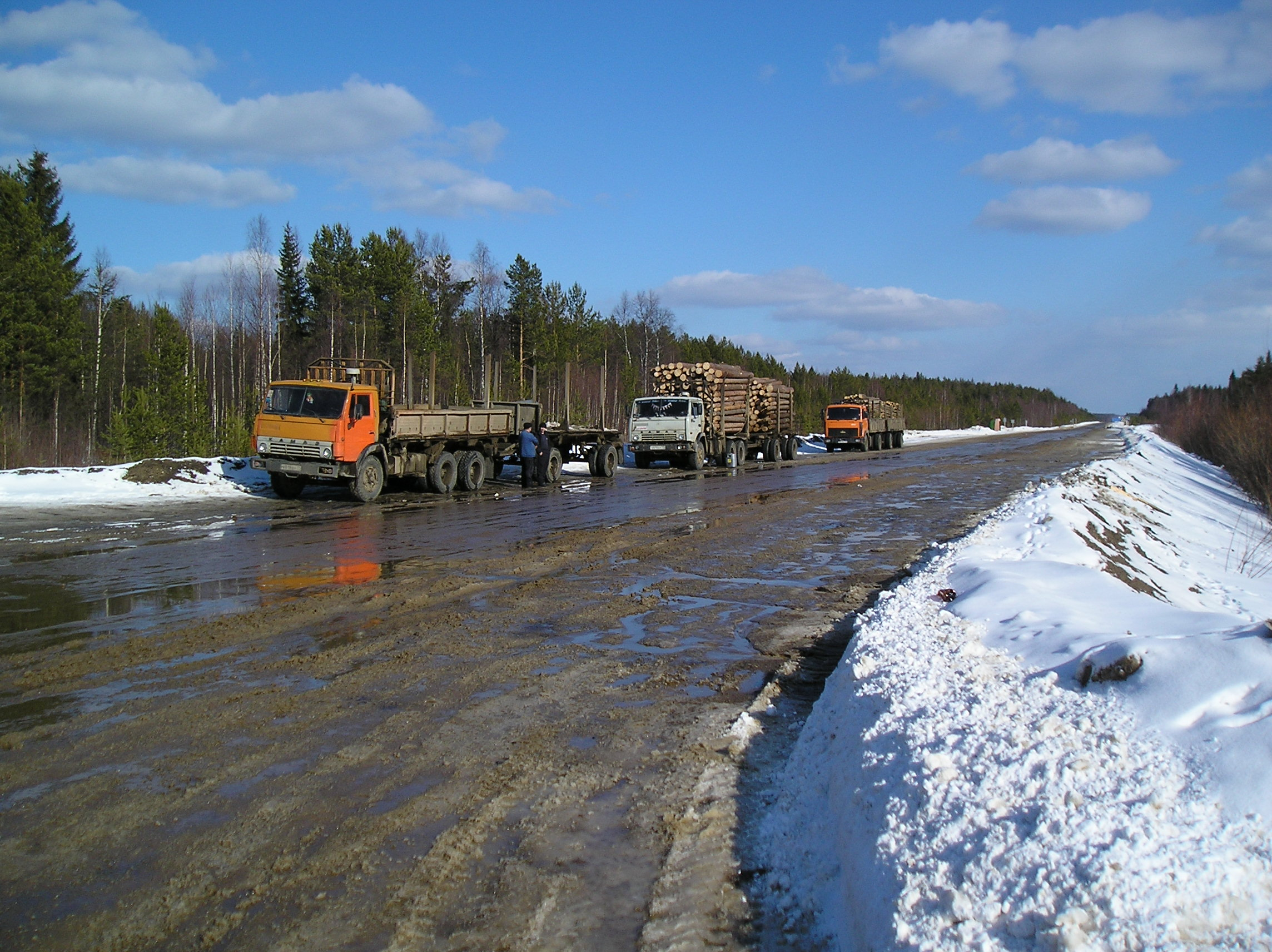
- Logging trucks, Kortkerossky District

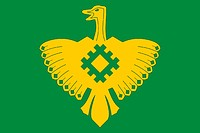
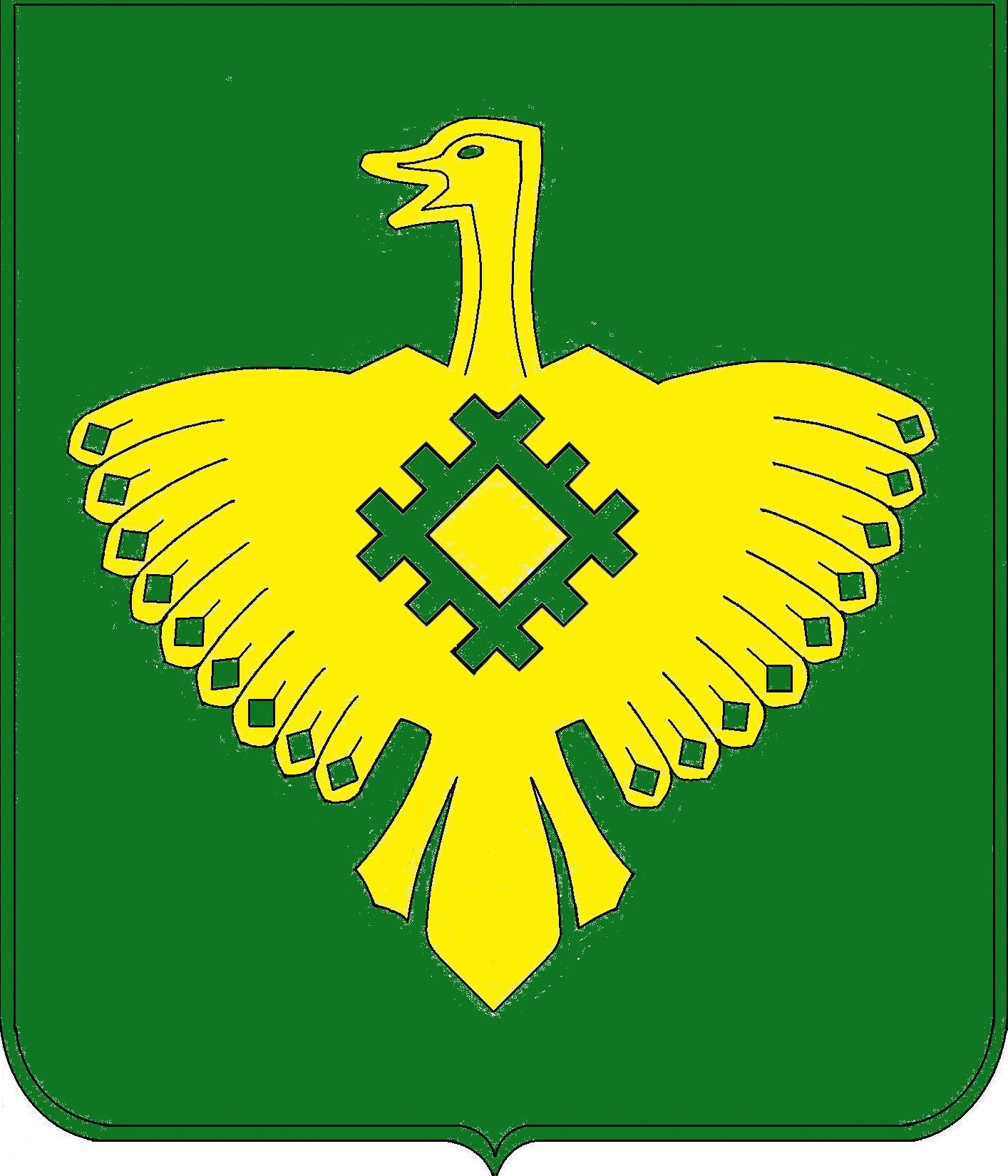
- Flag Coat of arms
- Location of Kortkerossky District in the Komi Republic
- Coordinates: 61°48′N 51°35′E
- Country: Russia
- Federal subject: Komi Republic
- Established: 14 July 1939
- Administrative center: Kortkeros

Area
  - Total: 19,760 km^{2} (7,630 sq mi)

Population (2010 Census)
  - Total: 19,658
  - Density: 0.9948/km^{2} (2.577/sq mi)
  - Urban: 0%
  - Rural: 100%

Administrative structure
  - Administrative divisions: 14 selo administrative territories, 4 settlement administrative territories
  - Inhabited localities: 53 rural localities

Municipal structure
  - Municipally incorporated as: Kortkerossky Municipal District
  - Municipal divisions: 0 urban settlements, 18 rural settlements
- Time zone: UTC+3 (MSK)
- OKTMO ID: 87616000
- Website: http://www.kortkeros.ru

Population of Kortkerossky District
- 2010 Census: 19,658
- 2002 Census: 23,642
- 1989 Census: 27,555
- 1979 Census: 28,176

Kortkerossky District (Russian: Корткеросский райо́н; Komi: Кӧрткерӧс район, Körtkerös rajon) is an administrative district (raion), one of the twelve in the Komi Republic, Russia. It is located in the south of the republic. The area of the district is 19,760 square kilometers (7,630 sq mi). Its administrative center is the rural locality (a selo) of Kortkeros. As of the 2010 Census, the total population of the district was 19,658, with the population of Izhma accounting for 20.0% of that number.

== Etymology ==
Kortkeros' name was derived from two Komi words, кӧрт ("iron") and керӧс ("mountain"). Based on archaeological evidence and the names of locations (such as Körtyag, Lake Körtty, and the Körtvis River meaning "Iron Pine", "Iron Lake", and "Iron River" respectively), the village of Kortkeros was considered by archaeologists to be an ancient metallurgical centre.

== Administrative and municipal status ==
Within the framework of administrative divisions, Kortkerossky District is one of the twelve in the Komi Republic. The district is divided into fourteen selo administrative territories and four settlement administrative territories, which comprise fifty-three rural localities. As a municipal division, the district is incorporated as Kortkerossky Municipal District. Its eighteen administrative territories are incorporated as eighteen rural settlements within the municipal district. The selo of Kortkeros serves as the administrative center of both the administrative and municipal district.

== See also ==
- Kört-Aika Monument
