= Troitsko-Pechorsky District =

Troitsko-Pechorsky District Троицко-Печорский район (Russian)
- District

Other transcription(s)
  - Komi: Мылдiн район
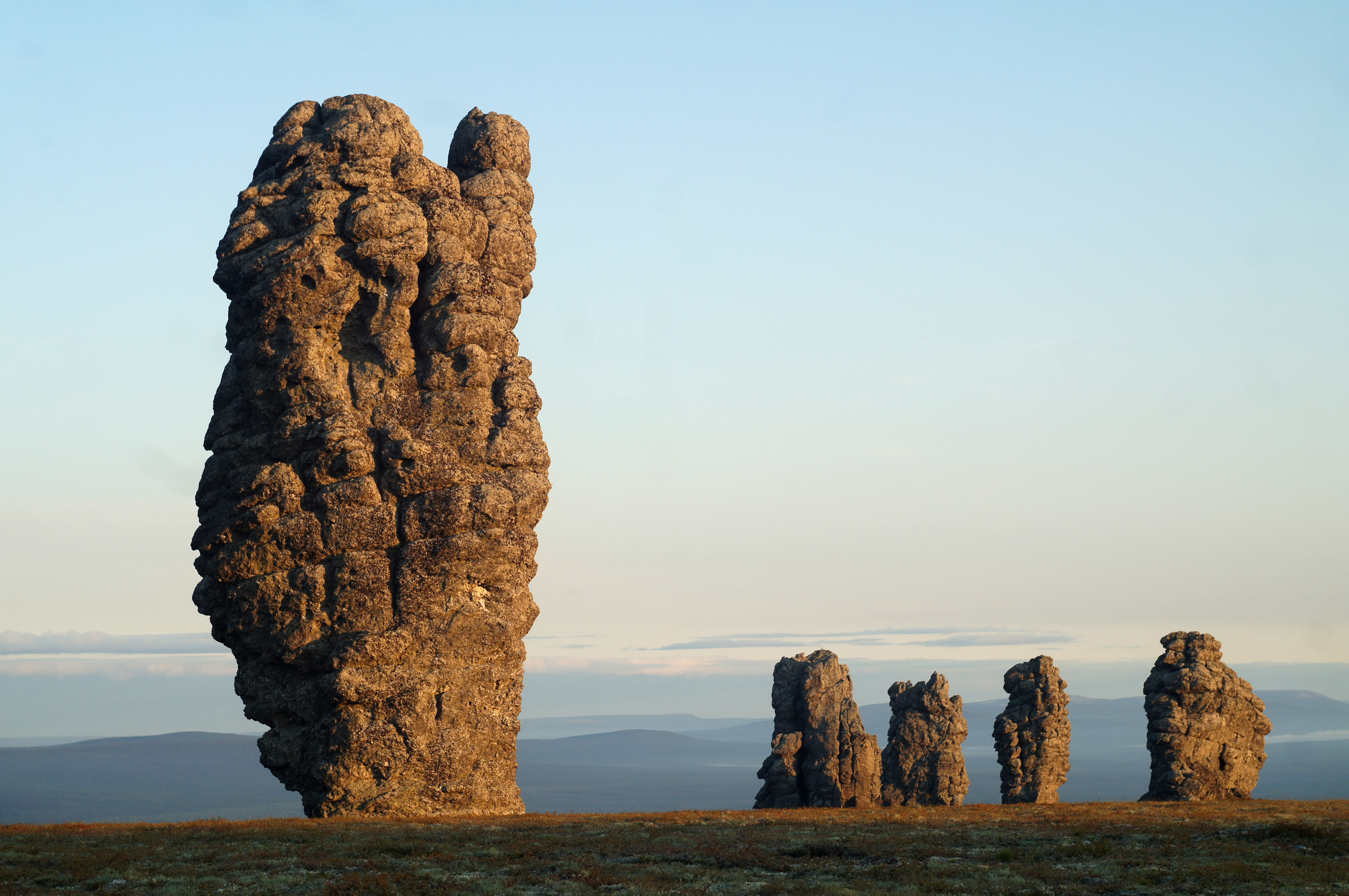
- Manpupuner rock formations, a protected area of Russia in Troitsko-Pechorsky District

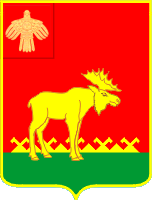
- Coat of arms
- Location of Troitsko-Pechorsky District in the Komi Republic
- Coordinates: 62°42′N 56°12′E
- Country: Russia
- Federal subject: Komi Republic
- Administrative center: Troitsko-Pechorsk

Area
  - Total: 40,700 km^{2} (15,700 sq mi)

Population (2010 Census)
  - Total: 13,925
  - Density: 0.342/km^{2} (0.886/sq mi)
  - Urban: 52.3%
  - Rural: 47.7%

Administrative structure
  - Administrative divisions: 1 Urban-type settlement administrative territories, 3 Selo administrative territories, 7 Settlement administrative territories
  - Inhabited localities: 1 urban-type settlements, 31 rural localities

Municipal structure
  - Municipally incorporated as: Troitsko-Pechorsky Municipal District
  - Municipal divisions: 1 urban settlements, 10 rural settlements
- Time zone: UTC+3 (MSK)
- OKTMO ID: 87636000
- Website: http://trpk.ru

Population of Troitsko-Pechorsky District
- 2010 Census: 13,925
- 2002 Census: 17,610
- 1989 Census: 26,198
- 1979 Census: 28,747

Troitsko-Pechorsky District (Russian: Троицко-Печорский район, Tróicko-Pečórskij rajón; Komi: Мылдiн район, Myldïn rajon, [ˈmɨldin ˈrajon]) is an administrative district (raion), one of the twelve in the Komi Republic, Russia. It is located in the southeast of the republic. The area of the district is 40,700 square kilometers (15,700 sq mi). Its administrative center is the urban locality (an urban-type settlement) of Troitsko-Pechorsk. As of the 2010 Census, the total population of the district was 13,925, with the population of Troitsko-Pechorsk accounting for 52.3% of that number.

== Administrative and municipal status ==
Within the framework of administrative divisions, Troitsko-Pechorsky District is one of the twelve in the Komi Republic. It is divided into one urban-type settlement administrative territory (Troitsko-Pechorsk), three selo administrative territories, and seven settlement administrative territories, all of which comprise thirty-one rural localities. As a municipal division, the district is incorporated as Troitsko-Pechorsky Municipal District. Troitsko-Pechorsk Urban-Type Settlement Administrative Territory is incorporated into an urban settlement, and the ten remaining administrative territories are incorporated into ten rural settlements within the municipal district. The urban-type settlement of Troitsko-Pechorsk serves as the administrative center of both the administrative and municipal district.
