= Komi Republic =

First-level administrative division of Russia

Komi Republic Республика Коми (Russian)
- Republic

Other transcription(s)
  - Komi: Коми Республика
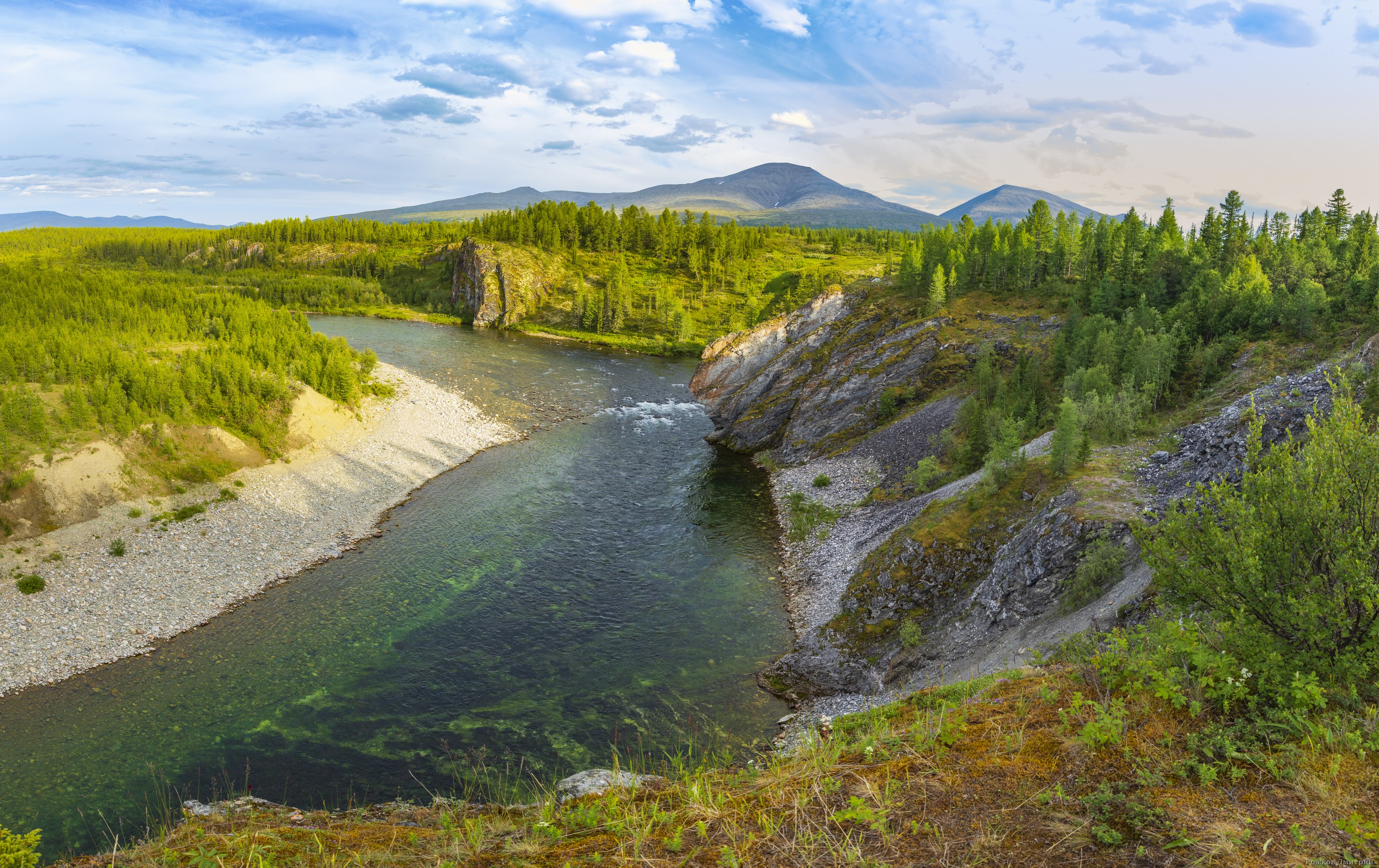
- Kozhim river, Yugyd Va National Park

- Flag Coat of arms
- Anthem: State Anthem of the Komi Republic
- Interactive map of Komi Republic
- Location within European Russia
- Coordinates: 64°17′N 54°28′E
- Country: Russia
- Federal district: Northwestern
- Economic region: Northern
- Established: December 5, 1936
- Capital: Syktyvkar

Government
  - Body: State Council
  - Head: Rostislav Goldstein

Area
  - Total: 416,774 km^{2} (160,917 sq mi)
  - Rank: 13th

Population (2021 census)
  - Total: 737,853: 22.3% Komi; 69.7% Russians; 1.9% Ukrainians; 0.7 Tatars; 0.5 Belarusians; 4.9% other
  - Estimate (2018): 840,873
  - Rank: 61st
  - Density: 1.77039/km^{2} (4.58529/sq mi)
  - Urban: 77.5%
  - Rural: 22.5%

GDP (nominal, 2024)
  - Total: ₽1.05 trillion (US$12.31 billion)
  - Per capita: ₽1.45 million (US$17,018.77)
- Time zone: UTC+3 (MSK)
- ISO 3166 code: RU-KO
- License plates: 11
- OKTMO ID: 87000000
- Official languages: Russian; Komi
- Website: http://www.rkomi.ru

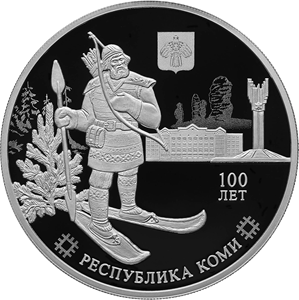
Bank of Russia coin dedicated to the 100th anniversary of the formation of the Komi Republic

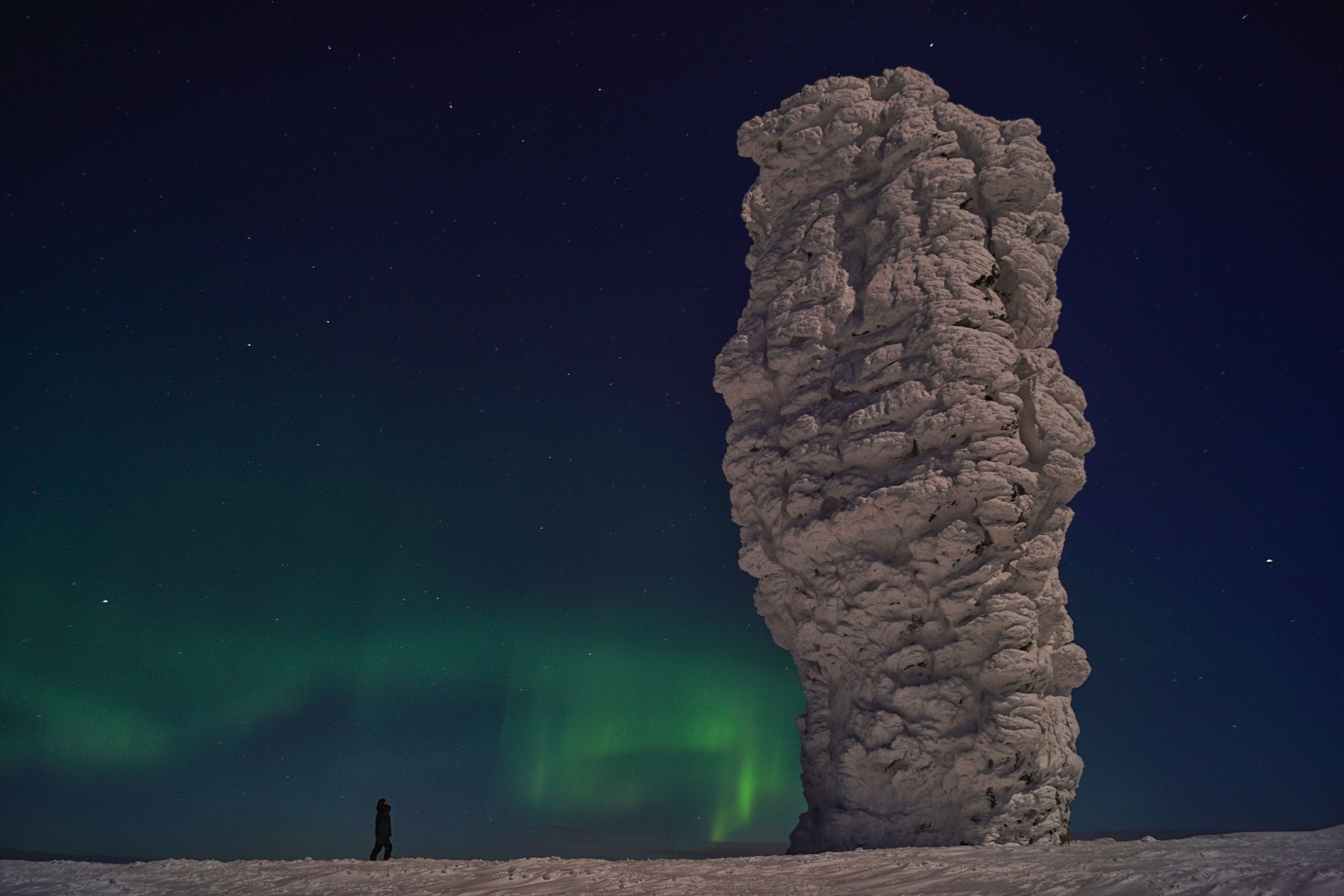
Weathering pillars on the Manpupuner plateau are one of the "Seven Wonders of Russia"

The Komi Republic, (Note: Russian: Республика Коми; Komi: Коми Республика) sometimes simply referred to as Komi, is a republic of Russia situated in the northeast of European Russia. Its capital is the city of Syktyvkar.

The population of the republic at the 2021 census was 737,853, down from 901,189 at the 2010 census.

== History ==
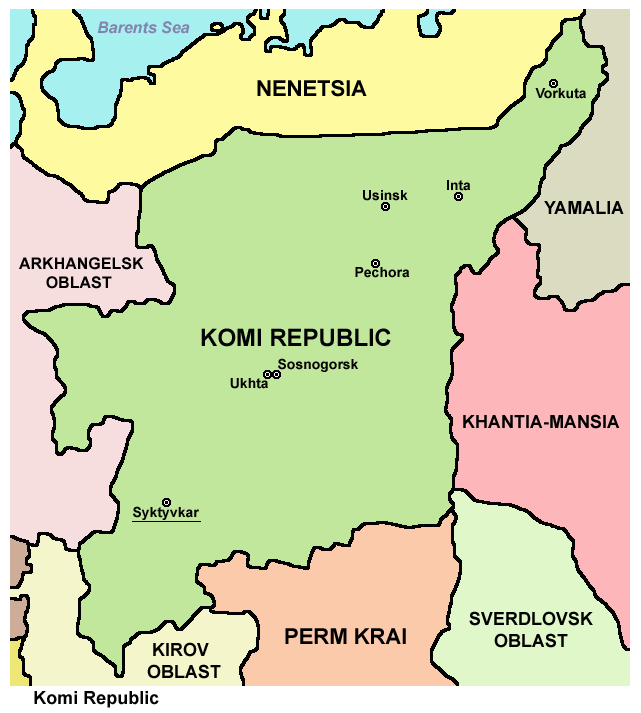
The Komi Republic with its main cities

The Komi people first feature in the records of the Novgorod Republic in the 11th century, when traders from Novgorod traveled to the Perm region in search of furs and animal hides. The Novgorodians called these lands Zavolochye ("beyond the portage"), from the Russian word volok ("portage"), and the Komi were referred to as "the Chud beyond the portage". The Novgorodians penetrated deep into these lands, and the methods used were typical of those used by later Russians in subsequent campaigns.

The Moscow principality also played an increasing role in the expansion into Komi territories, accompanied by a great increase in monastic activity in the 14th and 15th centuries under the influence of the Russian Orthodox Church. The missionary Stephen of Perm, a native of Ustyug, created the first alphabet for the Komi, known by contemporary Russians as Zyrians (zyriane). He settled in Ust-Vym and became the first bishop of Perm. After Novgorod was annexed by Moscow, the Komi territories came under the influence of Moscow in the late 15th and early 16th century. The site of Syktyvkar, settled from the 16th century, was known as Sysolskoye (Сысольскoe). In 1780, under Catherine the Great, it was renamed to Ust-Sysolsk (Усть-Сысольск) and used as a penal colony.

Russians explored the Komi territory most extensively in the 19th and early 20th centuries, starting with the expedition led by Alexander von Keyserling in 1843. They found ample reservoirs of various minerals, as well as timber, to exploit. After the founding of the Soviet Union in 1922, the Komi-Zyryan Autonomous Oblast was established on August 22, 1921, and on December 5, 1936, it was reorganized into the Komi Autonomous Soviet Socialist Republic with its administrative center located at the town of Syktyvkar.

Many of the "settlers" who arrived in the early 20th century were prisoners of the Gulag – sent by the hundreds of thousands to perform forced labor in the Arctic regions of the USSR. Towns sprang up around labor-camp sites, which gangs of prisoners initially carved out of the untouched tundra and taiga. The first mine, "Rudnik No. 1", became the city of Vorkuta, and other towns of the region have similar origins: "Prisoners planned and built all of the republic's major cities, not just Ukhta but also Syktyvkar, Pechora, Vorkuta, and Inta. Prisoners built Komi's railways and roads, as well as its original industrial infrastructure." On 21 March 1996, the Komi Republic signed a power-sharing agreement with the government of Russia, granting it autonomy. The agreement was abolished on 20 May 2002.

== Geography ==
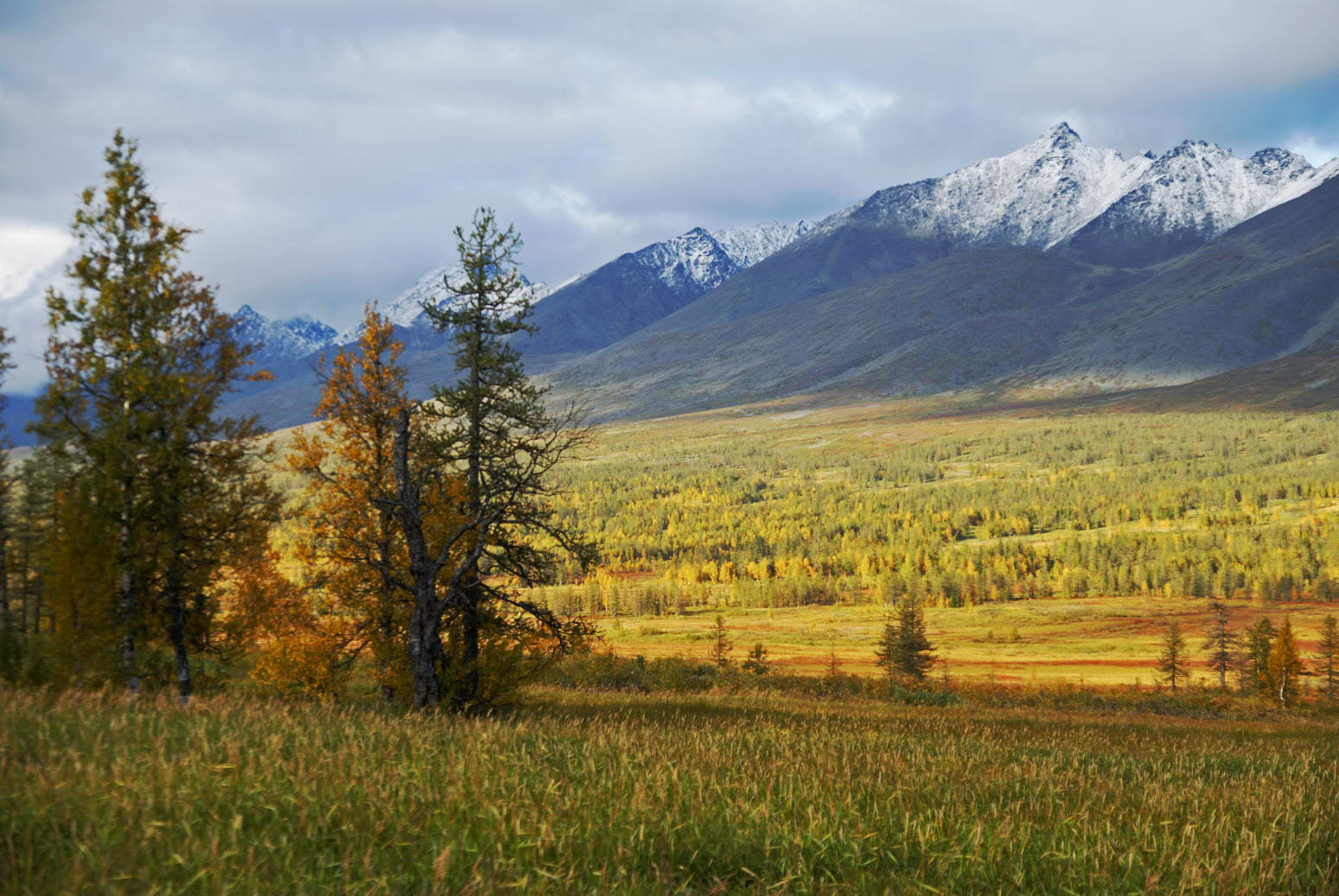
Yugyd Va National Park

The republic is situated to the west of the Ural Mountains, in the north-east of the East European Plain. The Polar Urals rise in the northeastern part. Forests cover over 70% of the territory, and swamps cover approximately 15%. The Komi Republic is the second-largest federal region by area in European Russia after Arkhangelsk Oblast.

- Area: 415,900 square kilometers (160,600 sq mi)
- Borders (all internal): Nenets (NW/N), Yamalo-Nenets (NE/E), Khanty–Mansi (E), Sverdlovsk (SE), Perm Krai (S), Kirov (S/SW), and Arkhangelsk (W).
- Highest point: Mount Narodnaya (1,894 m)
- Maximum N→S distance: 785 kilometers (488 mi)
- Maximum E→W distance: 695 kilometers (432 mi)

=== Rivers ===
Major rivers include:

- Izhma River
- Mezen River
- Pechora River
- Sysola River
- Usa River
- Vashka River
- Vychegda River
- Vym River

=== Lakes ===
There are many lakes in the republic. Major lakes include:

- Sindorskoye Lake
- Yam-Ozero Lake

=== Natural resources ===
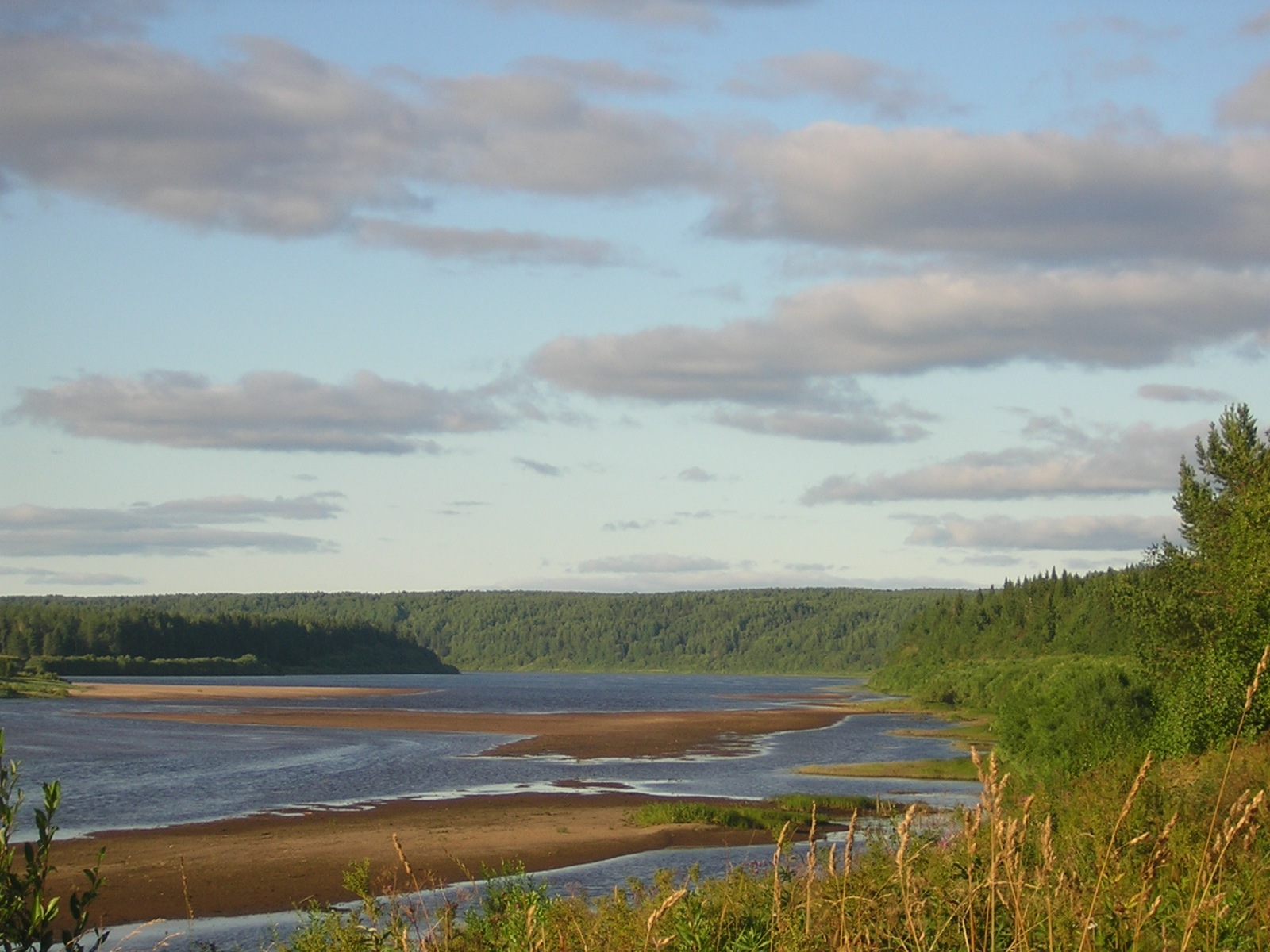
The Vym River, Komi Republic, Russia.

The republic's natural resources include coal, oil, natural gas, gold, diamonds, and timber. Native reindeer are in abundance and have been intentionally bred for human usage by the indigenous population.

Around 32,800 km^{2} of mostly boreal forest (as well as some alpine tundra and meadows) in the Republic's Northern Ural Mountains have been recognized in 1995 as a UNESCO World Heritage Site, Virgin Komi Forests. It is the first natural UNESCO World Heritage Site in Russia and the largest expanse of virgin forests in Europe. The site includes two pre-existing protected areas: Pechora-Ilych Nature Reserve (created in 1930) and Yugyd Va National Park (created in 1994).

=== Climate ===
Winters in the republic are long and cold, and the summers, while short, are quite warm.

- Average January temperature: −17 °C (1 °F) (southern parts) to −20 °C (−4 °F) (northern parts)
- Average July temperature: 11 °C (52 °F) (northern parts) to 15 °C (59 °F) (southern parts)
- Lowest recorded temperature: −58.1 °C (−72.6 °F) (village of Ust-Shchuger)
- Average annual precipitation: 625 mm (24.6 in)

=== Manpupuner and the 7 Strong Men rock formations ===
Deemed one of the Seven Wonders of Russia, the Komi Republic is home to Manpupuner (Man-Pupu-Nyer), a site in the northern Ural Mountains, in the Troitsko-Pechorsky District, made out of seven rock towers bursting out of the flat plateau known as the "7 Strong Men". Manpupuner is a very popular attraction in Russia, but not on an international level. Information regarding its origin is scarce. However, it is known that their height and abnormal shapes make the top of these rock giants inaccessible even to experienced rock-climbers.

== Administrative divisions ==
Komi Republic is divided into 12 raions or districts.

Komi Republic, Russia
Capital: Syktyvkar
As of 2014:
Number of districts (районы)	12
Number of cities/towns (города)	10
Number of urban-type settlements (посёлки городского типа)	29
Number of administrative territories (административные территории)	173
As of 2002:
Number of rural localities (сельские населённые пункты)	729
Number of uninhabited rural localities (сельские населённые пункты без населения)	17

Administrative division of Komi Republic

== Demographics ==
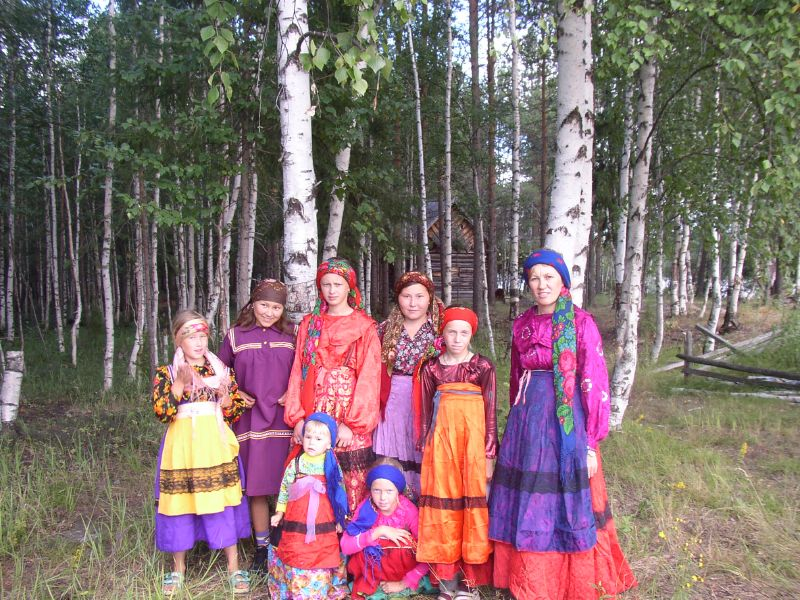
Komi people

Population: 737,853 (2021 census); 901,189 (2010 census); 1,018,674 (2002 census); 1,261,024 (1989 Soviet census).

Historical population
Year	Pop.	±%
1897	171,000	—
1926	207,314	+21.2%
1939	318,969	+53.9%
1959	815,799	+155.8%
1970	964,802	+18.3%
1979	1,118,121	+15.9%
1989	1,261,024	+12.8%
2002	1,018,674	−19.2%
2010	901,189	−11.5%
2021	737,853	−18.1%
Source: Census data

	17-12-1926	17-01-1939	17-01-1959	15-01-1970	17-01-1979	17-01-1989	09-10-2002	14-10-2010
Total population	207,314	318,996	806,199	964,802	1,110,361	1,250,847	1,018,674	901,189
Average annual population growth				+1.7%	+1.6%	+1.3%	-1.6%	-1.5%
Males	46%	49%	52%	50%	51%	50%	48%	
Females	54%	51%	48%	50%	49%	50%	52%	
Females per 1000 males								
Proportion urban	4.4%	9.1%	59.4%	61.9%	70.8%	75.5%	75.3%	
Territory (km^{2})	434,150	415,900	415,900	415,900	415,900	415,900	415,900	415,900
Population density/km^{2}	0.5	0.8	1.9	2.3	2.7	3.0	2.4	2.2

=== Settlements ===
Largest cities or towns in the Komi Republic 2010 Russian Census
Rank		Administrative Division	Pop.
1	Syktyvkar	City of republic significance of Syktyvkar	235,006
2	Ukhta	Town of republic significance of Ukhta	99,591
3	Vorkuta	Town of republic significance of Vorkuta	70,548
4	Pechora	Town of republic significance of Pechora	43,105
5	Usinsk	Town of republic significance of Usinsk	40,827
6	Inta	Town of republic significance of Inta	32,080
7	Sosnogorsk	Town of republic significance of Sosnogorsk	27,757
8	Yemva	Knyazhpogostsky District	14,570
9	Vuktyl	Town of republic significance of Vuktyl	12,356
10	Mikun	Ust-Vymsky District	10,730

=== Vital statistics ===
Source: Russian Federal State Statistics Service

	Average population (x 1000)	Live births	Deaths	Natural change	Crude birth rate (per 1000)	Crude death rate (per 1000)	Natural change (per 1000)	Total fertility rate
1920		4 760	4 353	407				
1930		10 256	6 574	3 682				
1940		14 976	12 134	2 842				
1945		6 432	6 185	247				
1950	534	20 087	6 002	14 085	37.6	11.2	26.4	
1960	836	25 578	5 010	20 568	30.6	6.0	24.6	
1965	938	18 956	5 241	13 715	20.2	5.6	14.6	
1970	970	16 462	6 276	10 186	17.0	6.5	10.5	
1975	1 044	18 899	7 284	11 615	18.1	7.0	11.1	
1980	1 137	20 685	9 169	11 516	18.2	8.1	10.1	
1981	1 153	21 244	9 103	12 141	18.4	7.9	10.5	
1982	1 169	23 420	8 758	14 662	20.0	7.5	12.5	
1983	1 185	23 806	9 250	14 556	20.1	7.8	12.3	
1984	1 199	24 217	9 486	14 731	20.2	7.9	12.3	
1985	1 213	23 303	9 334	13 969	19.2	7.7	11.5	
1986	1 228	24 176	8 112	16 064	19.7	6.6	13.1	
1987	1 242	23 616	8 544	15 072	19.0	6.9	12.1	
1988	1 256	20 916	8 930	11 986	16.7	7.1	9.5	
1989	1 256	18 481	8 857	9 624	14.7	7.1	7.7	
1990	1 244	16 930	9 321	7 609	13.6	7.5	6.1	1.873
1991	1 231	15 589	9 665	5 924	12.7	7.9	4.8	
1992	1 214	13 880	11 426	2 454	11.4	9.4	2.0	
1993	1 199	12 158	14 642	2 484	10.1	12.2	2.1	
1994	1 174	11 835	16 074	4 239	10.1	13.7	3.6	
1995	1 145	11 105	15 057	3 952	9.7	13.2	3.5	1.317
1996	1 124	10 900	13 674	2 774	9.7	12.2	2.5	
1997	1 106	10 388	12 244	1 856	9.4	11.1	1.7	
1998	1 087	10 793	11 545	752	9.9	10.6	0.7	
1999	1 068	9 680	12 253	2 573	9.1	11.5	2.4	
2000	1 050	9 906	13 594	3 688	9.4	12.9	3.5	1.219
2001	1 036	10 325	13 968	3 643	10.0	13.5	3.5	1.272
2002	1 021	11 177	15 265	4 088	10.9	15.0	4.0	1.374
2003	1 004	11 462	15 810	4 348	11.4	15.8	4.3	1.401
2004	987	11 489	15 210	3 721	11.6	15.4	3.8	1.397
2005	971	10 975	15 074	4 099	11.3	15.5	4.2	1.332
2006	955	10 872	13 519	2 647	11.4	14.1	2.8	1.318
2007	941	11 523	12 304	781	12.2	13.1	0.8	1.406
2008	928	11 719	12 270	551	12.6	13.2	0.6	1.452
2009	916	11 868	12 182	314	13.0	13.3	0.3	1.62
2010	903	11 648	11 819	171	12.9	13.1	0.2	1.63
2011		11 715	11 097	+ 443	13.0	12.4	+ 0.6	1.71
2012	890	12 418	10 830	+ 1 588	14.0	12.2	+ 1.8	1.88
2013	876	12 436	10 484	+ 1 952	14.2	12.0	+ 2.2	1.96
2014	868	12 291	10 621	+ 1 670	14.2	12.2	+ 2.0	2.01
2015	861	11 797	10 666	+ 1 131	13.6	12.3	+ 1.3	2.00
2016	854	11 239	10 523	+ 716	13.1	12.3	+ 0.8	1.97
2017	845	9 766	9 958	192	11.5	11.8	0.3	1.78

==== Regional vital statistics for 2011 ====
District	Birth Rate	Death Rate	Natural Growth Rate	Russians as % of Pop	Native Komi and Nenets as % of Pop
Komi Republic	13.0	12.4	▲0.06%	96.05%	3.95%
Syktyvkar	12.5	10.2	▲0.23%	97.61%	2.39%
Vorkuta	11.8	9.7	▲0.21%	92.33%	7.67%
Vuktyl	11.2	12.6	▼-0.14%	95.27%	4.73%
Inta	11.1	12.6	▼-0.15%	95.40%	4.60%
Pechora	13.0	13.6	▼-0.06%	96.89%	3.11%
Sosnogorsk	12.6	14.4	▼-0.18%	97.02%	2.98%
Usinsk	14.7	9.0	▲0.57%	86.04%	13.96%
Ukhta	11.0	10.7	▲0.03%	96.20%	3.80%
Izhemsky	19.1	18.8	▲0.03%	99.62%	0.38%
Knyazhpogostsky	11.6	15.9	▼-0.43%	95.50%	4.50%
Koygorodsky	16.2	18.3	▼-0.21%	97.89%	2.11%
Kortkerossky	16.9	18.6	▼-0.17%	98.86%	1.14%
Priluzsky	15.6	18.4	▼-0.28%	98.98%	1.02%
Syktyvdinsky	17.3	13.3	▲0.40%	98.11%	1.89%
Sysolsky	16.4	17.6	▼-0.12%	98.37%	1.63%
Troitsko-Pechorsky	14.0	17.9	▼-0.39%	97.80%	2.20%
Udorsky	15.6	13.1	▲0.25%	95.33%	4.67%
Ust-Vymsky	12.0	15.8	▼-0.38%	96.48%	3.52%
Ust-Kulomsky	19.2	18.9	▲0.03%	98.96%	1.04%
Ust-Tsilemsky	16.1	15.4	▲0.07%	99.62%	0.38%

=== Ethnic groups ===
According to the 2010 Census, ethnic Russians make up 65.1% of the republic's population, while the ethnic Komi make up 23.7%. Other groups include Ukrainians (4.2%), Tatars (1.3%), Belarusians (1%), Ethnic Germans (0.6%), Chuvash (0.6%), Azeris (0.6%), and a host of smaller groups, each accounting for less than 0.5% of the total population.

Ethnic group	1926 census (1926 territory)^{1}		1926 census (present territory)		1939 census		1959 census		1970 census		1979 census		1989 census		2002 census		2010 census^{2}		2021 census	
Ethnic group	Number	%	Number	%	Number	%	Number	%	Number	%	Number	%	Number	%	Number	%	Number	%	Number	%
Komi	191,245	92.2%	195,400	86.9%	231,301	72.5%	245,074	30.4%	276,178	28.6%	280,798	25.3%	291,542	23.3%	256,464	25.2%	202,348	23.7%	127,350	22.3%
Russians	13,731	6.6%	28,300	12.6%	70,226	22.0%	389,995	48.4%	512,203	53.1%	629,523	56.7%	721,780	57.7%	607,021	59.6%	555,963	65.1%	398,547	69.7%
Ukrainians	34	0.0%	200	0.1%	6,010	1.9%	80,132	9.9%	82,955	8.6%	94,154	8.5%	104,170	8.3%	62,115	6.1%	36,082	4.2%	11,041	1.9%
Nenets	2,080	1.0%	200	0.1%	1,000	0.4%	508	0.2%	374	0.0%	369	0.0%	366	0.0%	376	0.0%	708	0.1%	215	0.0%
Tatars	33	0.0%	200	0.1%	709	0.2%	8,459	1.0%	11,906	1.2%	17,836	1.6%	25,980	2.1%	15,680	1.5%	10,779	1.3%	4,083	0.7%
Belarusians	11	0.0%	200	0.1%	3,323	1.0%	22,339	2.8%	24,706	2.6%	24,763	2.2%	26,730	2.1%	15,212	1.5%	8,859	1.0%	2,639	0.5%
Others	180	0.1%	6,919	2.2%	59,826	7.4%	56,485	5.9%	62,921	5.7%	80,269	6.4%	61,474	6.0%	40,272	4.7%	39,564	4.6%	28,008	4.9%
^{1} The territory of the Komi AO was different from the Komi Republic.^{2} Excluding 46,886 people who were registered from administrative databases, and could not declare an ethnicity. It is estimated that the proportion of ethnicities in this group is the same as that of the declared group.

=== Religion ===
Religion in Komi Republic as of 2012 (Sreda Arena Atlas)
Russian Orthodoxy	30.2%
Other Orthodox	0.6%
Old Believers	0.6%
Other Christians	4.9%
Islam	0.9%
Rodnovery and other native faiths	0.9%
Spiritual but not religious	41%
Atheism and irreligion	14.5%
Other and undeclared	6.4%

According to a 2012 survey, 30.2% of the population of Komi adheres to the Russian Orthodox Church, 4% are unaffiliated generic Christians, 1% are Rodnovers or Komi native religious believers, 1% are Muslims, 1% are Orthodox Christians not belonging to churches or members of non-Russian Orthodox churches, 1% are Old Believers, and 0.4% are members of the Catholic Church. In addition, 41% of the population declared to be "spiritual but not religious", 14% is atheist, and 6.4% follows other religions or failed to answer the question.

=== Education ===
There are over 450 secondary schools in the republic (with ~180,000 students). The most important higher education facilities include Komi Republican Academy of State Service and Administration, Syktyvkar State University and Ukhta State Technical University.

== Politics ==
The head of government in the Komi Republic is the Head of the Republic. As of 2024, the current Head is Rostislav Goldshteyn.

The State Council is the legislature.

== Economy ==
The Komi Republic's major industries include oil processing, timber, woodworking, paper, natural gas and electric power industries. Major industrial centers are Syktyvkar, Inta, Pechora, Sosnogorsk, Ukhta, and Vorkuta.

Komigaz conducts natural gas transportation and distribution. The Yaregskoye oil field is developed by Lukoil.

The petroleum, wood and paper industries made up 94.5% of the Republic’s exports in 2021.

=== Transportation ===
Railroad transportation is very well developed. The most important railroad line is Kotlas–Vorkuta–Salekhard, which is used to ship most goods in and out of the republic. The rivers Vychegda and Pechora are navigable. There are airports in Syktyvkar, Ukhta, and Vorkuta.

In 1997, total railroad trackage was 1,708 km, automobile roads 4,677 km.

== Sports ==
Stroitel plays again in the Russian Bandy Super League in the 2017–18 season, after several years in Russian Bandy Supreme League, the second highest division. In 2015 a bandy federation for the republic was founded. In 2016 the authorities presented a five-year plan to develop bandy in the republic. There was an application in place to host the 2021 Bandy World Championship, but it was postponed due to the COVID-19 pandemic and then cancelled after many participants pulled out after the 2022 invasion of Ukraine.

== See also ==
- Komi-Permyak Okrug
- Komi mythology
- Udoria
- Extreme points of Europe
- Valery Leontiev
- List of rural localities in the Komi Republic
