= Compassionate love =

Love for the good of the other

Compassionate love, sometimes also called altruistic love, is love that "centers on the good of the other" (p. 3, Underwood, 2008). It is closely related to the construct of unlimited love that has been expounded by Stephen G. Post. It is distinct from altruism, compassion, and romantic love. Compassionate love has been a topic of scientific interest and research since the 1990s. Since 2001, the scientific study of compassionate love has received several million dollars in research support from the Fetzer Institute and the Institute for Research on Unlimited Love (IRUL).

The emergence of the term compassionate love has been described by Lynn G. Underwood in a chapter in the first edited book on compassionate love research, The Science of Compassionate Love. The term first emerged in the context of a research meeting at the World Health Organization (WHO) for developing tools to assess quality of life to be used in diverse cultures. The group included researchers from all over the world, from both religious and nonreligious backgrounds. One of the facets of interest was loving kindness, or love for others. Underwood writes that "There was considerable discussion of the appropriate wording for this aspect. The Buddhists were not happy with the word 'love' but wanted 'compassion' to be used, which for them fit the concept. The Muslims in the group (from Indonesia, India, and Turkey) were adamant that compassion was too 'cold' and that 'love' needed to be there as it brought in the feeling of love.... 'compassionate love' was the compromise phrase" (pp. 8–9, Underwood, 2008).

Scientific research on compassionate love began to emerge after a 1999 conference at the Massachusetts Institute of Technology (MIT) that brought together several key theorists and researchers and produced an edited book reflecting major ideas.

== Approaches to defining it ==
According to Underwood's framework, which has informed a substantial portion of the scientific research, 5 key and defining features of compassionate love are:

1. Free choice for the other
2. Some degree of accurate cognitive understanding of the situation, the other, and oneself
3. Valuing the other at a fundamental level
4. Openness and receptivity
5. Response of the heart

Underwood's approach was incorporated in the initial funding for scientific research on compassionate love, based on a Request for Proposals (RFP) issued by Fetzer Institute in 2001.

Bioethicist and theologian Stephen G. Post's approach to altruistic love has also informed a substantial portion of the scientific research on compassionate love, although he more often uses the terms altruistic love and unlimited love. Post's understanding of unlimited love is presented in his 2003 book Unlimited love: Altruism, compassion and service Post draws on work published in the 1950s by eminent Harvard sociologist Pitirim Sorokin, who described 5 dimensions of love (intensivity, extensivity, duration, purity, and adequacy). Compared to Underwood's definitions of compassionate love, Post's definition of unlimited love places greater emphasis on extensivity – in particular, the extension of love to all human beings. Unlimited love as defined by Post might therefore be viewed as a subtype of compassionate love. Post's approach was incorporated in the second batch of funding for scientific research on compassionate love, based on an RFP issued by the Institute for Research on Unlimited Love in 2002.

== Health effects ==
Several of the research projects on compassionate love that were funded by Fetzer and IRUL investigated health effects from engaging in compassionate love, which evidence suggests are primarily positive. Post edited a scholarly book that described many scientific findings related to compassionate love, altruism, and health.
