= Social control =

Concept in the social and political sciences

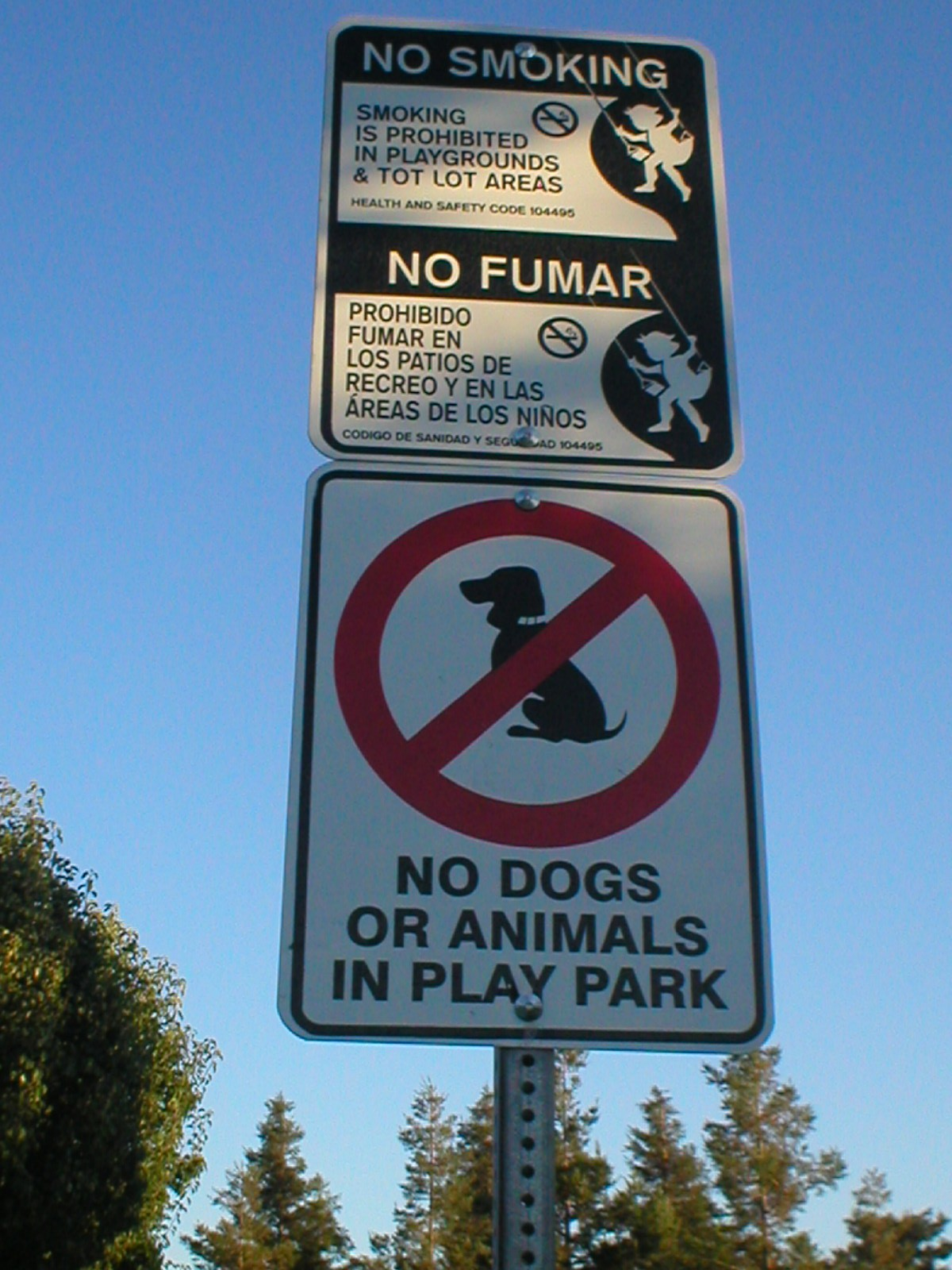
Signs warning of prohibited activities; an example of social control

Social control is the regulations, sanctions, mechanisms, and systems that restrict the behaviour of individuals in accordance with social norms and orders. Through both informal and formal means, individuals and groups exercise social control both internally and externally. As an area of social science, social control is studied by researchers of various fields, including anthropology, criminology, law, political science, and sociology.

Social control is considered one of the foundations of social order. Sociologists identify two basic forms of social control. Informal means of control refer to the internalization of norms and values through socialization. Formal means comprise external sanctions enforced by government to prevent the establishment of chaos or anomie in society. Some theorists, such as Émile Durkheim, refer to formal control as regulation.

== History ==
Social control developed together with civilization, as a rational measure against the uncontrollable forces of nature which tribal organisations were at prey to within archaic tribal societies. Criminal persecutions first emerged around sixth century B.C. as a form of formal social control in Athens, Greece. The purpose of these persecutions were to check certain groups and protect them from malicious interests. Historically, religion also provided an informal moral influence on communities and individuals.

Prior to the wider use of the term "social control", social philosophers referred to the concept in early works. In Leviathan, Thomas Hobbes discusses how the state exerts social order using civil and military power. Cesare Beccaria's On Crimes and Punishments argues that people will avoid criminal behavior if their acts result in harsher punishment, and that changes in punishment act as a form of social control. Sociologist Émile Durkheim also explored social control in the work The Division of Labour in Society, discussing the paradox of deviance and arguing that social control is what makes us abide by laws in the first place.

The term "social control" was first introduced to sociology by Albion Woodbury Small and George Edgar Vincent in 1894. However, at the time, sociologists only showed sporadic interest in the subject. While the concept of social control has been around since the formation of organized sociology, the meaning has been altered over time. Originally, the concept simply referred to society's ability to regulate itself. However, in the 1930s, the term took on its more modern meaning of an individual's conversion to conformity. Academics began to study social control theory as a separate field in the early 20th century. Within the 20th century, social scientists presumed that religion was still a principal factor of social control.

In the decades leading up to the end of the 1980s, an increased prevalence of the individual as a feature within society led to new psychotherapeutic modalities, suggesting the use of therapy as a means of social control.

== Informal control ==
=== Social values ===
Social values are result of an individual internalizing certain norms and values. Social values present in individuals are products of informal social control, exercised implicitly by a society through particular customs, norms, and mores. Individuals internalize the values of their society, whether conscious or not of the indoctrination. Traditional society relies mostly on informal social control embedded in its customary culture to socialize its members. The internalization of these values and norms is known as a process called socialization.

Sociologist Edward A. Ross argues that belief systems exert a greater control on human behavior than laws imposed by government, no matter what form the beliefs take.

=== Sanctions ===
Informal sanctions may include shame, ridicule, sarcasm, criticism, and disapproval, which can cause an individual to stray towards the social norms of the society. In extreme cases sanctions may include social discrimination and exclusion. Informal social control usually has more effect on individuals because the social values become internalized, thus becoming an aspect of the individual's personality.

=== Reward and punishment ===
Informal controls reward or punish acceptable or unacceptable behavior (i.e., deviance) and are varied from individual to individual, group to group, and society to society. For example, at a Women's Institute meeting, a disapproving look might convey the message that it is inappropriate to flirt with the minister. In a criminal gang, on the other hand, a stronger sanction applies in the case of someone threatening to inform to the police of illegal activity.

Social control by use of reward is known as positive reinforcement. In society and the laws and regulations implemented by the government tend to focus on punishment or the enforcing negative sanctions to act as a deterrent as means of social control.

=== Theoretical bias within the modern media ===
Theorists such as Noam Chomsky have argued that systemic bias exists in the modern media. The marketing, advertising, and public relations industries have thus been said to utilize mass communications to aid the interests of certain political and business elites. Powerful ideological, economic and religious lobbyists have often used school systems and centralized electronic communications to influence public opinion.

== Formal control ==
=== Sanctions ===
Formal sanctions are usually imposed by the government or organizations in the form of laws to reward or punish behavior. Some formal sanctions include fines and incarceration in order to deter negative behavior. Other forms of formal social control can include other sanctions that are more severe depending on the behavior seen as negative such as censorship, expulsion, and limits on political freedom.

Examples of this can be seen in law. If a person breaks a law set forth by the government and is caught, they will have to go to court and depending on the severity, will have to pay fines or face harsher consequences.

According to a study on crime in cities, those where police make more arrests for public offenses and have higher incarceration rates tend to experience lower crime rates.

=== Techniques ===
Law is a technique used for the purposes of social control. For example, there are certain laws regarding appropriate sexual relationships; these are largely based on societal values. Historically, homosexuality has been criminalised in the West. In modern times, due to shifts in societal values, Western societies have mostly decriminalized homosexual relations. However, there are still laws regarding age of consent and incest, as these are still deemed as issues in society that require means of control.

A mechanism of social control occurs through the use of selective incentives. Selective incentives are private goods, which are gifts or services, made available to people depending on whether they do or don't contribute to the good of a group, collective, or the common good. If people do contribute, they are rewarded, if they don't they are punished. Mancur Olson gave rise to the concept in its first instance (cf. The Logic of Collective Action).

Oberschall, in his work, identifies three elements to the pragmatics of social control as they exist in our current society. These are, confrontational control, such as riot control and crowd control, preventative measures to deter non-normal behaviors, which is legislation outlining expected boundaries for behavior, and measures complementary to preventative measures, which amount to punishment of criminal offences.

Cities can implement park exclusion orders (prohibiting individuals from frequenting some or all of the parks in a city for an extended period due to a previous infraction), trespass laws (privatizing areas generally thought of as public so police can choose which individuals to interrogate), and off-limit orders (Stay Out of Drug Areas (SODA) and Stay Out of Areas of Prostitution (SOAP) that obstruct access to these spaces). These are just a few of the new social control techniques cities use to displace certain individuals to the margins of society. Several common themes are apparent in each of these control mechanisms. The first is the ability to spatially constrain individuals in their own city. Defying any of the above statutes is a criminal offense resulting in possible incarceration. Though not all individuals subjected to an exclusion order obey it, these individuals are, at the very least, spatially hindered through decreased mobility and freedom throughout the city. This spatial constrain on individuals leads to disruption and interference in their lives. Homeless individuals generally frequent parks since the area provides benches for sleeping, public washrooms, occasional public services, and an overall sense of security by being near others in similar conditions. Privatizing areas such as libraries, public transportation systems, college campuses, and commercial establishments that are generally public gives the police permission to remove individuals as they see fit, even if the individual has ethical intent in the space. Off-limit orders attempting to keep drug addicts, prostitutes, and others out of concentrated areas of drug and sex crimes commonly restricts these individuals' ability to seek social services beneficial to rehabilitation, since these services are often located within the SODA and SOAP territories.

==== Broken windows theory in the United States ====
In the United States, early societies were able to easily expel individuals deemed undesirable from public space through vagrancy laws and other forms of banishment. In the 1960s and 1970s, however, these exclusion orders were denounced as unconstitutional in America and consequently were rejected by the US Supreme Court. The introduction of broken windows theory in the 1980s transformed the concepts cities used to form policies, to circumvent the previous issue of unconstitutionality. According to the theory, the environment of a particular space signals its health to the public, including to potential vandals. By maintaining an organized environment, individuals are dissuaded from causing disarray in that particular location. However, environments filled with disorder, such as broken windows or graffiti, indicate an inability for the neighborhood to supervise itself, therefore leading to an increase in criminal activity. Instead of focusing on the built environment, policies substantiated by the Broken Windows Theory overwhelmingly emphasize undesirable human behavior as the environmental disorder prompting further crime. The civility laws, originating in the late 1980s and early 1990s, provide an example of the usage of this latter aspect of the Broken Windows Theory as legitimization for discriminating against individuals considered disorderly in order to increase the sense of security in urban spaces. These civility laws effectively criminalize activities considered undesirable, such as sitting or lying on sidewalks, sleeping in parks, urinating or drinking in public, and begging, in an attempt to force the individuals doing these and other activities to relocate to the margins of society. Not surprisingly then, these restrictions disproportionally affect the homeless.

Individuals are deemed undesirable in urban space because they do not fit into social norms, which causes unease for many residents of certain neighborhoods. This fear has been deepened by the Broken Windows Theory and exploited in policies seeking to remove undesirables from visible areas of society. In the post-industrial city, concerned primarily with retail, tourism, and the service sector, the increasing pressure to create the image of a livable and orderly city has no doubt aided in the most recent forms of social control. These new techniques involve even more intense attempts to spatially expel certain individuals from urban space since the police are entrusted with considerably more power to investigate individuals, based on suspicion rather than on definite evidence of illicit actions.

== See also ==
- Authority bias – Cognitive bias
- Cancel culture – Modern form of ostracism
- Countercontrol – Term used by Dr. B.F. Skinner
- Criminal justice – Justice to those who have committed crimes
- Cybernetics – Study of circular causal processes
- Gaslighting – Type of psychological manipulation
- Guilt society
- Mind control – Systematic coercive persuasion
- Opinion corridor – Theory of legitimate public discourse
- Orwellian – Adjective derived from the author George Orwell
- Ostracism – Democratic procedure for expelling citizens
- Power (social and political) – Ability to influence the behaviour of others
- Shame society
- Social change – Any significant alteration in societal order
- Social constructionism – Sociological theory regarding shared understandings
- Social engineering – Discipline in social science
- Social relations – Any interpersonal relationship between two or more conspecifics between/within groups
- Sociology of revolution – 1925 book by Pitirim Sorokin
- Speaking truth to power – Non-violent political tactic employed by dissidents
- Surveillance – Monitoring something for the purposes of influencing, protecting, or suppressing it
