= Vologda electoral district =

Constituency of the Russian Republic

Vologda
- Former Civilian constituency for the All-Russian Constituent Assembly
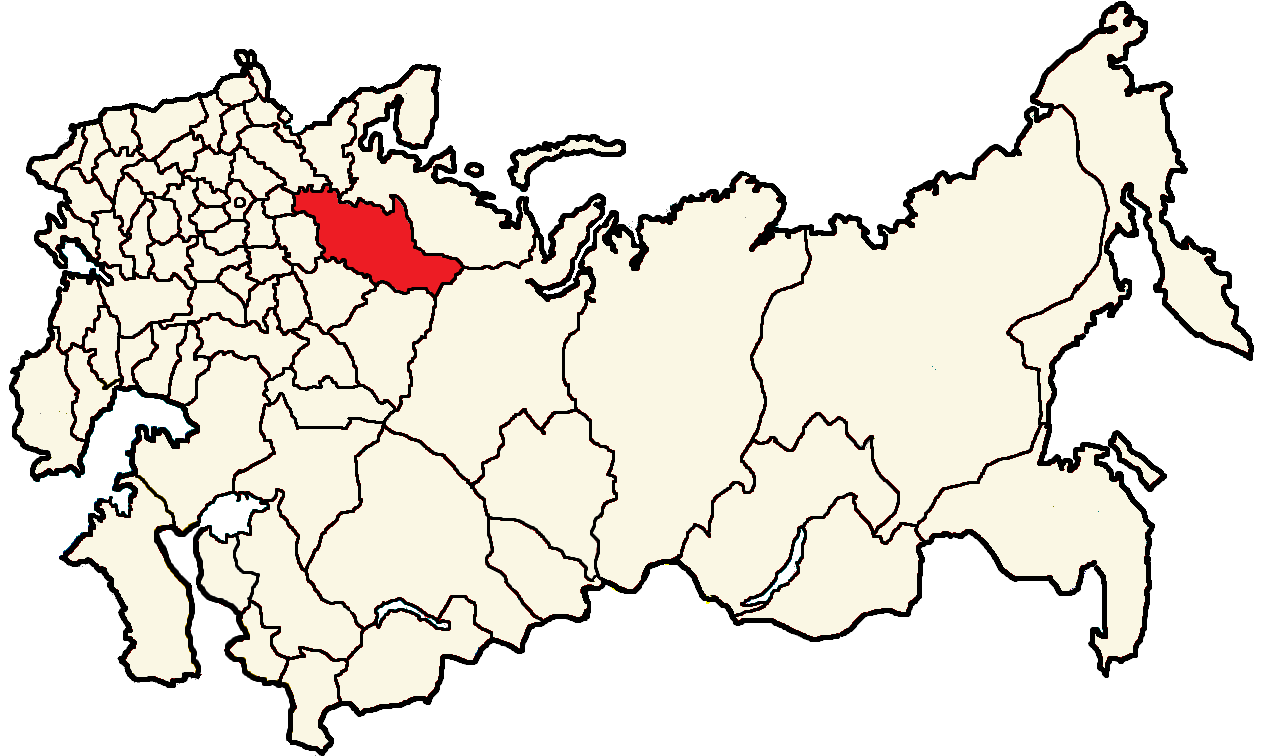

Former constituency
- Created: 1917
- Abolished: 1918
- Number of members: 7
- Number of Uyezd Electoral Commissions: 10
- Number of Urban Electoral Commissions: 1
- Number of Parishes: 263

The Vologda electoral district (Russian: Вологодский избирательный округ) was a constituency created for the 1917 Russian Constituent Assembly election. The electoral district covered the Vologda Governorate. Out of the 10 uezds in Vologda electoral district, the account of U.S. historian Oliver Henry Radkey (see table below) has 1 uezds with a largely incomplete vote count and gaps in coverage in another 2 uezds.

In Vologda the Bolsheviks and Mensheviks had a common list. Soviet sources indicated that Social Democratic list was dominated by the Bolsheviks. In the Komi areas, the main competitors of the SRs were the Kadets and the Popular Socialists.

== Results ==
Vologda
Party	Vote	%	Seats	%
List 1 - Socialist-Revolutionaries and Soviet of Peasants' Deputies	320,528	75.79	6	85.71
List 2 - Social Democrats (Bolsheviks/Mensheviks)	67,650	16.00	1	14.29
List 4 - Kadets	22,912	5.42		
List 3 - Popular Socialists	8,071	1.91		
List 5 - Unity	3,742	0.88		
Total:	422,903		7	

Deputies Elected
Galkin	SR
Koryakin	SR
Maslov	SR
Raschesaev	SR
Sorokin	SR
Yuretsky	SR
Vetoshkin	Bolshevik

In Vologda town the Kadets got 5,973 votes (37.5%), the SRs 4,651 (29.2%), the Social Democrats 3,718 votes (23.3%), Unity 1,169 votes (7.3%) and the Popular Socialists 423 votes (2.7%). In the Vologda garrison, the SRs got 929 votes (47.4%), the Social Democrats 825 votes (42.1%), the Kadets 163 votes (8.3%), Unity 27 votes (1.4%) and the Popular Socialists 15 votes (0.8%).
