= Pitirim Sorokin =

Russian sociologist (1889-1968)

- Питирим Сорокин
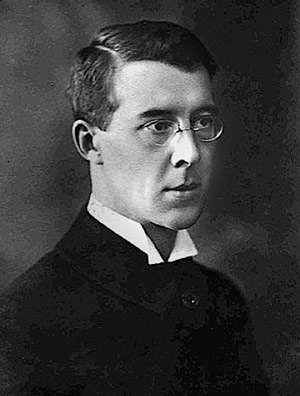
- Sorokin in 1917

Member of the Russian Constituent Assembly
- In office 25 November 1917 – 20 January 1918 (Note: The Constituent Assembly was declared dissolved by the Bolshevik-Left SR Soviet government, rendering the end the term served.)
- Preceded by: Constituency established
- Succeeded by: Constituency abolished
- Constituency: Vologda

Personal details
- Born: 4 February [O.S. 23 January] 1889 Turya, Yarensky Uyezd, Vologda Governorate, Russian Empire (now Komi Republic, Russia)
- Died: 10 February 1968 (aged 79) Winchester, Massachusetts, U.S.
- Citizenship: Russian Empire (1889–1917); Stateless (1922–1930); United States (1930–1968)
- Party: Socialist Revolutionary Party
- Spouse: Elena Petrovna Baratynskaya (m. 1894)
- Children: 2, including Peter
- Education: Saint Petersburg Imperial University
- Scientific career
- Awards: 55th President of American Sociological Association
- Fields: Sociology
- Workplaces: Saint Petersburg Imperial University; Harvard University; University of Minnesota
- Doctoral students: Robert K. Merton

Pitirim Alexandrovich Sorokin (/səˈroʊkɪn, sɔː-/; Russian: Питирим Александрович Сорокин; 4 February [O.S. 23 January] 1889 – 10 February 1968) was a Russian American sociologist and political activist, who contributed to the social cycle theory.

Sorokin was a professor at Saint Petersburg Imperial University, three times imprisoned by the Czarist regime for "revolutionary activity." His active opposition to the Bolsheviks led, after they were in power, to his arrest and sentence to death. Only with the help and intervention of friends, including Thomas Masaryk and Edouard Beneš, was his sentence commuted to permanent exile, which led Sorokin to flee to Czechoslovakia.

Moving to the United States, he became a professor of sociology at the University of Minnesota in 1924, and, in 1930, he was hired as head of the newly formed department of sociology at Harvard University.

== Background ==
Pitirim Alexandrovich Sorokin was born on 4 February [O.S. 23 January] 1889, in Turya, a small village in Yarensky Uyezd, Vologda Governorate, Russian Empire (now Knyazhpogostsky District, Komi Republic, Russia), the second son to a Russian father and Komi mother. Sorokin's father, Alexander Prokopievich Sorokin, was from Veliky Ustyug and a traveling craftsman specializing in gold and silver. At the same time, while his mother, Pelageya Vasilievna, was a native of Zheshart and belonged to a peasant family. Vasily, his elder brother, was born in 1885, and his younger brother, Prokopy, was born in 1893. Sorokin's mother died on March 7, 1894, in the village of Kokvitsa. After her death Sorokin and his elder brother Vasily stayed with their father, traveling with him through the towns searching for work. At the same time, Prokopy was taken in by his aunt, Anisya Vasilievna Rimsky. The latter lived with her husband, Vasily Ivanovich, in the village of Rimia. Sorokin's childhood, spent among the Komi, was complicated, but enriched by a religious and moral education. The moral qualities (such as piety, a firm belief in good and love) cultivated in him at that time would yield their fruits in his subsequent work (his amitology and call to overcome the crisis of modernity).

Pitirim's father developed alcoholism. Because of this, his father had severe anxiety and panic attacks to the point where he was physically abusive to his sons. After a brutal beating that left a scar on Pitirim's upper lip, Pitirim, at the age of eleven, along with his older brother, decided that he wanted to be independent and no longer under their father's care.

Sorokin was anti-Czarist. He was arrested at the age of 17. He was arrested twice more for his anti-Czarist activities.

In the early 1900s, supporting himself as an artisan and clerk, Sorokin attended the Saint Petersburg Imperial University in Saint Petersburg, where he earned his graduate degree in criminology and became a professor.

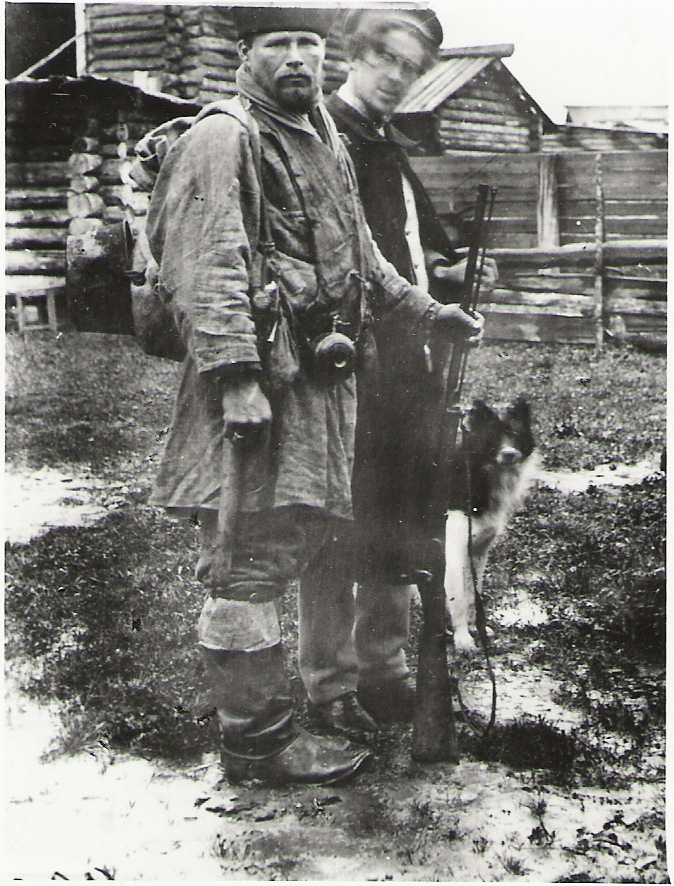
Sorokin (right) in Komi, 1911

Sorokin was an anti-communist. During the Russian Revolution he was a member of the Socialist Revolutionary Party, a deputy of the Russian Constituent Assembly, a supporter of the White movement, and a secretary to Prime Minister Alexander Kerensky. After the October Revolution, Sorokin continued to fight communist leaders and was arrested by the new regime several times before he was eventually condemned to death. After six weeks in prison, Sorokin was released and went back to teaching at the University of Saint Petersburg, becoming the founder of the sociology department at the university. As he had been a leader among the Democrats leading up to the Russian Revolution, he was sought by Vladimir Lenin's forces after Lenin consolidated his power.

Accounts of Sorokin's activities in 1922 differ; he may have been arrested and exiled by the Soviet government, or he may have spent months in hiding before escaping the country. After leaving Russia, he emigrated to the United States, where he became a naturalized citizen in 1930. Sorokin was personally requested to accept a Harvard University position, founding the Department of Sociology and becoming a vocal critic of his colleague, Talcott Parsons.

Sorokin was an ardent opponent of communism, which he regarded as a "pest of man". People viewed him as a leader, but some viewed him as an outcast which can be one reason why he was exiled. At the time people were not understanding of his ideas that would promote emancipation and change, and the theories that he provided were not always well accepted.

Sorokin was a sociology professor at the University of Minnesota from 1924 to 1929 when he accepted an offer of a position by the president of Harvard University to join the Harvard faculty, where he continued to work until 1959. One of his students was writer Myra Page.

== Inspiration ==
In 1910, young Sorokin was shaken to the core by the death of the great Russian writer Leo Tolstoy. In the article "LN Tolstoy as a philosopher" (1912) he carried out a reconstruction of the religious and moral teaching of Tolstoy, which he regarded as the philosophical representation of a harmonious and logical system (Sorokin, 1912: 80–97). Tolstoy's teaching exceeded the habitual bounds of traditional philosophy and flowered into a certain kind of moral philosophy, which attracted Sorokin immensely. He marked out the structure of Tolstoy's teaching by grounding it in ‘the tradition of four great philosophical problems: the essence of the world; the nature of ego; the problem of cognition and the issue of values’ (Johnston et al., 1994: 31). According to Tolstoy, God is the basis of our existence and love is the way to God. Sorokin formulated the main principles forming the foundation of Tolstoy's Christian ethics: the principle of love, the principle of non-violent resistance to evil and the principle of not doing evil.

== Works and interests ==
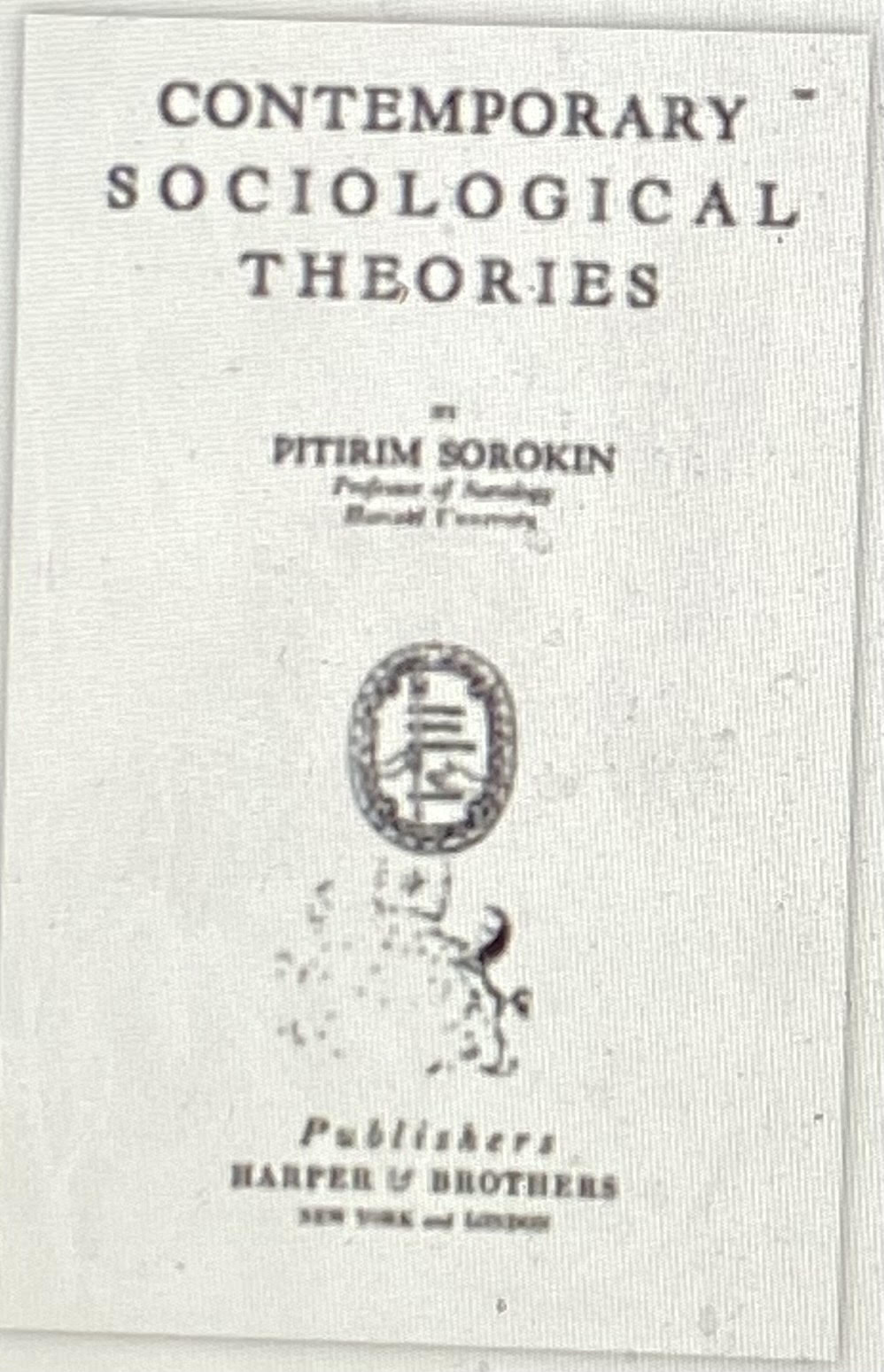
The picture of the book cover for one of Sorokin's more famous works

Before his achievements as a professor in the United States, he published his 1924 Leaves of a Russian Diary by (E.P. Dutton & Co.), giving a daily, and sometimes hourly account of the Russian Revolution. He first started in February 1917 where he was in the forefront of creating a provisionary government, only to see it unravel and lose power to the Bolsheviks in October 1917. In 1950, Sorokin published an addendum to the book called The Thirty Years After. It is a personal and brutally honest account of the revolution and his exile.

Sorokin's academic writings are extensive; he wrote 37 books and more than 400 articles. His controversial theories of social process and the historical typology of cultures are expounded in Social and Cultural Dynamics (4 vol., 1937–41; rev. and abridged ed. 1957) and many other works. Sorokin was also interested in social stratification, the history of sociological theory, and altruistic behavior.

Sorokin's work follows a pattern throughout time from an early period of miscellaneous writings, sociocultural dynamics and social criticism, and then altruism. He believed that altruism had a lot of scientific support for it. After going to Harvard in 1930, Sorokin found his calling and began his famous study of world civilization which led to the work for which he is best known, Social and Cultural Dynamics. This work set the tone for the condemnation of modern society's Sensate culture (see below) which is prominent in all of Sorokin's writings since 1937. This condemnation is part of the reason he was always challenged because people were not ready and acceptive of the idea of change and nobody was willing to take responsibility for their actions. Sorokin's extensive study convinced him that our civilization is overly materialistic, disorganized, and in imminent danger of collapse. He spent the next dozen years in warning the public of the danger and seeking a way out and a way to change society.

Hornell Hart criticized Sorokin's statistical analysis in Social and Cultural Dynamics.

One of his works, Russia and the United States (1944) is considered wartime propaganda for the peace. Sorokin argues that American and Russian culture have so much in common that these two nations, destined to be the leading postwar power centers, will have a secure basis for friendship. Both nations exemplify unity in diversity. Their cultures favor breadth of outlook, cosmopolitanism, and a healthy self-esteem tempered with tolerance of other societies.

His works are timeless due to the fact they were able to open up new fields of study and make way for more innovative ways of thinking. His works covered a wide variety of topics from rural sociology, war, revolution, social mobility, and social change. He stayed true to his works though and part of the reason he was able to fight for so much change and reform was his commitment to his religion. He was of Komi descent and they were considered some of the most hardworking and religious people in Europe.

He was one of the signatories of the agreement to convene a convention for drafting a world constitution. As a result, for the first time in human history, a World Constituent Assembly convened to draft and adopt the Constitution for the Federation of Earth.

=== Social differentiation, social stratification, and social conflict ===
Sorokin's work addressed three significant theories: social differentiation, social stratification, and social conflict. The idea of social differentiation describes three types of societal relationships. The first is familistic, which is the type that we would generally strive for. It is the relationship that has the most solidarity, the values of everyone involved are considered, and there is a great deal of interaction.

Social stratification refers to the fact that all societies are hierarchically divided, with upper and lower strata and unequal distribution of wealth, power, and influence across strata. There is always some mobility between these strata. People or groups may move up or down the hierarchy, acquiring or losing their power and influence.

Social conflict refers to Sorokin's theory of war. Whether internal to a nation or international, peace is based on the similarity of values among a country or between different nations. War has a destructive phase when values are destroyed and a declining phase, when some of the values are restored. Sorokin thought that the number of wars would decrease with increased solidarity and decreased antagonism. If a society's values stressed altruism instead of egoism, the incidence of war would diminish.

=== Three principal types of culture integration ===
Sorokin's magnum opus is regarded by many to be Social and Cultural Dynamics. He classifies societies according to their 'cultural mentality'. This can be "ideational" (reality is spiritual and immaterial), "sensate" (truth is material and all things are in flux), or "idealistic" (a synthesis of the two).

He suggested that significant civilizations evolve from a conceptual to an idealistic, and eventually to a sensate mentality. Each of these phases of cultural development not only seeks to describe the nature of reality, but also stipulates the nature of human needs and goals to be satisfied, the extent to which they should be satisfied, and the methods of satisfaction. Sorokin has interpreted the contemporary Western civilization as a sensate civilization, dedicated to technological progress and prophesied its fall into decadence and the emergence of a new ideational or idealistic era. In Fads and Foibles, he criticizes Lewis Terman's Genetic Studies of Genius research, showing that his selected group of children with high IQs did about as well as a random group of children selected from similar family backgrounds would have done.

=== Five dimensions of love ===
According to Pitirim A. Sorokin, a pioneer of balanced research in altruism, the energy of love has at least five dimensions: Intensity, Extensity, Duration, Purity and the Adequacy of its manifestation in objective actions, in relation to its inner purpose. In intensity, love ranges between zero and the highest possible point, arbitrarily denoted as infinity. In extensity, love ranges from the zero point of love of oneself only, up to the love of all mankind, all living creatures, and the whole universe. In duration, love may range from the shortest possible moment to years or throughout the whole life of an individual or of a group. In purity, love ranges from the love motivated by love alone – without the taint of a ‘soiling motive’ of utility, pleasure, advantage, or profit, down to the ‘soiled love’ where love is but a means to a utilitarian or hedonistic or other end, where love is only the thinnest trickle in a muddy current of selfish aspirations and purposes. In the adequacy of love, it is based upon the expectation of each person to show love, be nice and understand the consequences of one's actions.

In his work on love, "Altruistic Love", Sorokin hopes to make the first steps toward discovering what kinds of people are likely to become saintly or neighborly, and eventually to lay the groundwork for producing more people that fit this profile for the betterment of society. He did this by studying the lives of saints, neighbors and other people based upon their sex, gender, race and socioeconomic status.

== Politics ==
Sorokin was politically engaged, studying the legitimacy of power, Russia's representative democracy, and how the national question and democratic structure are intertwined. He predicted a period of renewal for Russia after the fall of communism and that, out of the crisis this involved, the world could come to embrace altruistic love, a key theme in his later research.

Sorokin founded the Center for the Study of Creative Altruism at Harvard, where he developed quantitative and qualitative research into the ethics of love and social solidarity. Through examining case studies of altruistic love in various cultures and religious traditions, the center advocated an overcoming of human conflict through the disciplined fostering of altruistic love.

== Involvement with other sociologists ==
With the financial assistance of Eli Lilly, a friend of Sorokin who was a pharmaceutical heir, he was able to do further research in creative altruism. From this research, he gained much popularity and was well respected by other sociologists and sociology. He was referred to as the "founder of the sociology of altruism". Thus, he was allowed to create "The Harvard Research Center in Creative Altruism" in 1949 and had two instructors under him, Alfredo Gotsky and Talcott Parsons.

Although Sorokin and Parsons worked together as colleagues, Sorokin heavily criticized Parsons' works due to having opposing views. Sorokin disapproved of America's ways of civilization and felt as if it was in decline, creating tension between Sorokin and Parsons (Parsons being an American sociologist while Sorokin was Russian). The rift between them was put to the test when Harvard University and the American sociology community favored Parsons views, and Sorokin's administrative position in Harvard was seized.

Sorokin's research also focused on rural society, making him more approachable and referable by other moral conservatives. This initiated his collaboration with Carle Zimmerman, and together they expanded on the perspective of rural-urban sociology. They believed that the rural way of life was established from the following characteristics: a conservative and traditional family, an economy based on manual labor or from a family and home business and their connection to it, whether it be sociologically, demographically, or economically.

== American Sociological Association ==
Pitirim A. Sorokin served as the 55th President of the American Sociological Association. His presidential status did not come easily, as many of his peers found his election to be long overdue. Sorokin in 1952 lost the election to Florian Znaniecki, and was not given the customary second nomination. In 1963 after the influence from his former students and other high rank sociologists, he became the first write in nominated sociologist to be elected as president with 65% of the vote.

One of Sorokin's popular works was his presidential address, which was titled "Sociology of Yesterday, Today, and Tomorrow". In this address Sorokin talked a lot about sociology's transformation from discovery to investigation. A lot of sociologists at the time are beginning to refine older theories and works, while adapting to growth in society. Sorokin himself worked to verify the methods of preceding sociologists, while taking a look into the future of sociology and in what aspects it could grow and be influenced. He acknowledged how sociology was now viewed as meaningful and a "realm of reality". Some influences of sociology Sorokin looked at was cultural systems, social systems, and individuals who create, realize and exchange.

== Major impacts on influential figures ==
Sorokin impacted the historian Allan Carlson. He agreed with Sorokin and his disapproval of communism. Carlson also considered himself pro-family and agreed with Sorokin's views on how a family's most ideal environment is living in intimate, small village-like towns.

Sorokin also impacted the forty-eighth vice president, Michael Pence, who quoted him while defending his failed House Resolution, the Marriage Protection Amendment in 2006, when there were same-sex marriage debates. Pence stated, "Marriage matters according to the researchers. Harvard sociologist Pitirim Sorokin found that throughout history, the societal collapse was always brought about following the advent of the deterioration of marriage and family”.

In 1942, Rushton Coulborn and W. E. B. Du Bois praised Sorokin, describing him as one of their great contemporary social scientists.

Sorokin wrote president John F. Kennedy in 1961 when the United States were at a peak level of friction with Russia. In his letter, Sorokin expressed himself as knowledgeable in interacting with communist leaders. He also attempted to call for no war, as he believed none of the underlying issues would be solved until "mutual relationships be replaced by real friendly relationships". He also calls for Kennedy to refer to his sociological work "Mutual Convergence of the United States and the U.S.S.R. to the Mixed Sociocultural type" to help his decision on war and what to do with the relationship between the United States and Russia.

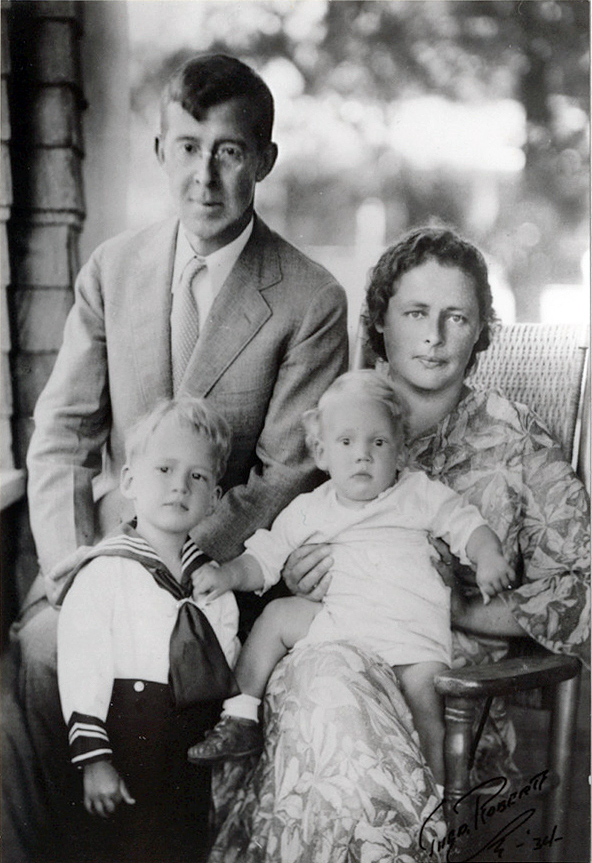
Image of Pitirim Sorokin and his wife along with his two sons in 1934.

== Personal life and death ==
Sorokin married Dr. Helen Baratynskaya, with whom he had two sons, Peter (1931—2015) and Sergey (1933—2026). Peter co-invented the dye laser.

Sorokin suffered from a severe illness, and after struggling for two years, he died on 10 February 1968, aged 79, in Winchester, Massachusetts. A Russian Orthodox service was held at home for the family, followed by an eclectic service at the Memorial Church of Harvard University.

The University of Saskatchewan currently holds Sorokin's papers in Saskatoon, Canada, where they are available to the public. In March 2009, the Sorokin Research Center was established at Syktyvkar State University facilities in Syktyvkar, Republic of Komi, for the purpose of research and publication of archive materials, mainly from the collection at the University of Saskatchewan. The first research project, "Selected Correspondence of Pitirim Sorokin: Scientist from Komi on The Service of Humanity" (in Russian), has been drafted and will be in print in the fall of 2009 in Russia.

== Major works ==
In English or English translation

    - Leaves from a Russian Diary (1924), New York, E. P. Dutton
    - The Sociology of Revolution (1925), New York, J. B. Lippincott
    - Social Mobility (1927), New York, Harper
- Contemporary Sociological Theories (1928), New York: Harper.online free
- Principles of Rural-Urban Sociology (1929, with Carle C. Zimmerman) New York : H. Holt. Preface: "a summary of Source book in rural sociology," in three volumes, prepared under the auspices of the U.S. Dept. of Agriculture and the University of Minnesota, to be published in 1930 or 1931"
- The Sociology of Revolution (1935) OCLC 84193425. FReprint, H. Fertig, 1967.
- Social and Cultural Dynamics (1937–1941), Cincinnati: American Book Company, 1937–1941. 4 vols.
- The Crisis of Our Age (1941), New York : Dutton, 1941 "Based upon four volumes of the author's Social and cultural dynamics."
- Man and Society in Calamity: The Effects of War, Revolution, Famine, Pestilence upon the Human Mind, Behavior, Social Organization and Cultural Life, E.P. Dutton and Company, Inc., 1942
- Russia and the United States (1944)
- Society, Culture, and Personality: Their Structure and Dynamics, A System of General Sociology (1947), Harper & Brothers Publishers:, New York & London. (723 double columned pages plus an 11 triple coumned page Index and a 7 triple columned page Index of Names)
- With Geyl, Pieter and Toynbee, Arnold J. The Pattern of the Past: Can We Determine It? (Boston: Becon, 1949)
- Social Philosophies of an Age of Crisis (1950)
- Altruistic Love: A Study of American "good Neighbors" and Christian Saints (1950)
- Leaves From a Russian Diary, and Thirty Years After (1950), Boston: Beacon Press. OCLC 1476438
- The Ways and Power of Love: Types, Factors, and Techniques of Moral Transformation. Philadelphia: Templeton Foundation Press (Original work published 1954). 2002. ISBN 978-1-890151-86-7. (with introduction by Stephen G. Post in 2002 edition) (552 pages)
- Fads and Foibles in Modern Sociology and Related Sciences (1956), Chicago:, H. Regnery Co. OCoLC 609427839. Reprinted by Greenwood Publishing Group, 1976, ISBN 978-0-8371-8733-4.
- The American Sex Revolution (1956), Boston : Porter Sargent Publishers
- Social and Cultural Dynamics: A Study of Change in Major Systems of Art, Truth, Ethics, Law and Social Relationships (1957 (reprinted 1970) ed.). Boston: Extending Horizons Books, Porter Sargent Publishers. 1957. ISBN 978-0-87558-029-6.
- (with Lunden, W. A.), Power and Morality: Who Shall Guard The Guardians? (1959), Boston, MA: Porter Sargent Publishers.
- A Long Journey: the Autobiography of Pitirim A. Sorokin (1963) College and University Press, LC 426641.
- Social And Cultural Mobility (1959 ed.). Boston: Free Press. 1959. ISBN 9780029302804.
- Sociology of Yesterday, Today, and Tomorrow (1963)
- Sociological Theories of Today. New York: Harper & Row, Publishers, Inc. 1966. ISBN 0405121210.
- Hunger As a Factor in Human Affairs (1975), University Presses of Florida.

== See also ==
- Komi Republic
- Sorokin Research Center
- Social cycle theory
- War cycles
- Sociology of revolution
- Perversion for Profit

== Sources ==
- Cuzzort, R. P. and King, E. W. (1995), Twentieth-Century social thought (5th ed.). New York, NY: Harcourt Brace College Publishers.
- Gambescia, C. (2002), Invito alla lettura di Sorokin. Rome, Italy: Edizioni Settimo Sigillo.
- Johnston, B.V (1995). Pitirim A. Sorokin an Intellectual Biography . Lawrence, KS: University Press of Kansas.
- Nieli, Russell (2006). "Critic of the Sensate Culture: Rediscovering the Genius of Pitirim Sorokin". Political Science Reviewer. 35 (1): 264–379.
- Yuri Doykov (2008–2009), Pitirim Sorokin: The Man Out of Season – A Biography (in Russian).
  - Vol. 1 (Archangelsk, 2008. 432 pages)
  - Vol. 2 (Archangelsk, 2009. 488 pages)
- Doykov Yuri (2009), Pitirim Sorokin in Prague, Archangelsk. 146 pages (in Russian).
- Doykov Yuri (2009), Pitirim Sorokin, Minneapolis (Minnesota) – Archangelsk. 184 pages (in Russian).
- Doykov, Yuri (2023). "Why was Pitirim Sorokin silent? From the Lubyanka to Harvard (1918-1930)" - Achangelsk. 91 pages (in Russian).
- Uzlaner, Dmitry; Stoeckl, Kristina (2017). "The legacy of Pitirim Sorokin in the transnational alliances of moral conservatives". Journal of Classical Sociology. 18 (2): 133–153. doi:10.1177/1468795X17740734. S2CID 148940943.
- Andrzej, Sarnacki (2017). "The decay of American culture?: Pitirim Sorokin's view on the relevance of the sex revolution" (PDF). Relacje Międzykulturowe. 2 (2): 105–120. Archived from the original on 2 June 2020.
- Jeffries, Vincent (September 2005). "Pitirim A. Sorokin's integralism and public sociology". The American Sociologist. 36 (3–4): 66–87. doi:10.1007/s12108-005-1017-x. JSTOR 27700434. S2CID 35597227.
- Johnston, Barry V (1987). "Pitirim Sorokin and the American sociological association: The politics of a professional society". Journal of the History of the Behavioral Sciences. 23 (2): 103–122. doi:10.1002/1520-6696(198704)23:2<103::AID-JHBS2300230202>3.0.CO;2-I.
- Johnston, Barry V (2016). "Pitirim A. Sorokin (1889–1968): Pioneer and Pariah". International Sociology. 11 (2): 229–238. doi:10.1177/026858096011002005. S2CID 144813413.
- Nichols, Lawrence T (2005). "Integralism and Positive Psychology: A Comparison of Sorokin and Seligman". Catholic Social Science Review. 10: 21–40. CiteSeerX 10.1.1.503.9085. doi:10.5840/cssr2005102.
- Krotov, Pavel (2012). "Pitirim Sorokin Studies in Russia in the Context of the New Section on Altruism, Morality, and Social Solidarity in the American Sociological Association". The American Sociologist. 43 (4): 366–373. doi:10.1007/s12108-012-9166-1. S2CID 144337991.
- Simpson, Richard L. (1953). "Pitirim Sorokin and His Sociology". Social Forces. 32 (2): 120–131. doi:10.2307/2573709. JSTOR 2573709.
- Uzlaner, Dmitry; Stoeckl, Kristina (May 2018). "The legacy of Pitirim Sorokin in the transnational alliances of moral conservatives". Journal of Classical Sociology. 18 (2): 133–153. doi:10.1177/1468795X17740734. S2CID 148940943.
- Ponomareva, Inna (November 2011). "Pitirim A Sorokin: The interconnection between his life and scientific work". International Sociology. 26 (6): 878–904. doi:10.1177/0268580910394003. S2CID 143210241.
