= Countercontrol =

Term used by Dr. B.F. Skinner

Countercontrol is a term used by Dr. B.F. Skinner in 1953 as a functional class in the analysis of social behavior. Opposition or resistance to intervention defines countercontrol, however little systematic research has been conducted to document its occurrence. Skinner also distinguished it from the literature of freedom, which he said did not provide effective countercontrol strategies. The concept was identified as a mechanism to oppose control such as escape from the controller or waging an attack in order to weaken or destroy the controlling power. For this purpose, Skinner stressed the role of the individual as an instrument of countercontrol, emphasizing the notion of vigilance along with the concepts of freedom and dignity.

== Behavior ==
Counter control can embed itself in both passive and active behavior. An individual may not respond to the demanding interventionist or may completely withdraw from the situation passively. The foundation for countercontrol is that human behavior is both a function of the environment and a source of control over it. Counter control originates from the essential behavior-analytic position which states that behavior is always caused or controlled. For Skinner, countercontrol is constituted by the behaviors that determine the behavior of the controller or those who hold authority.

== Fundamental ==
Control is fundamental in conceptual, experimental and applied behavior analysis, as it is fundamental in all experimental science. To study functional relations in behavior and environment, one must manipulate (control) environmental variables to study their effect in behavior. Countercontrol can be defined as human operant behavior as a response to social aversive control. The individual that is exposed to aversive control may try to oppose controlling attempts through the process of negative reinforcement, such as by escaping, attacking, or passively resisting.

Countercontrol is a way in which individuals regain behavioral freedom when faced with aversive controlling attempts of others.

== Types ==
There are two types of countercontrol:

- Counterattack or aggression
- Nonviolent resistance or escape

Countercontrol is mostly avoidance or escape behavior, thus, this behavior class is only unique insofar as the behaver is (a) confronted with some form of aversive interpersonal or social controlling stimulation and (b) responds to oppose control rather than to reinforce it by "giving in”.

From the principle of consequential causality or selection by consequences, responses occur and are then met by environmental consequences that control the situations of similar responses in future events. Skinner (1953, 1968, 1971, 1972, 1974, 1978) found that countercontrol was important in understanding human behavior because of the prevalence of aversive control in human relations. According to Michael (1982, 1993) Countercontrol can occur at two levels. At one level, countercontrolling behavior results in avoidance or escape from a short-term problem along with non-reinforcement or counter measure from the controlee. For example, a teacher threatens a student with detention and in response the student threatens the teacher with a serious allegation and in turn the teacher withdraws. At another level, individuals may avoid or escape specific short-term consequences contingent on the result that occurs but also avoid or escape long standing aversion contingencies in which those consequences participate.

There are multiple components of behaviour changes which may occur in countercontrol such being nontargeted responses which fits well with increasing emphasis on the ecological-systems considerations in behaviour analysis.

Countercontrol is also present when adults use modeling to influence the behavior of children. For instance, the adult exhibits appropriate behavior and directs the children to reproduce the same. However, resistance will often occur in the form of disobedience, negativism, opposition, and uncooperativeness thus reducing the probability of the child replicating the desired skill or behavior demonstrated by the adult.

A series of responses by the child may result by this resistance:

- ignore the model and refuse to respond
- perform some other, non-modeled behavior
- execute desire response in the absence of the model

== Variables precipitating countercontrol ==
- Prior exposure to contingencies: A high rate of reinforcement over a long period of time may promote an overdependence to stimulate performance. When extended reinforcement is removed, countercontrol may take place.
- Intrusiveness: Intrusiveness may strongly affect the individual's willingness to comply. Unneeded intrusive or directive procedures may cause resistance.
- Subject briefing: The subject's experience from previous interventions can affect the extent to which the subject cooperates.
- Freedom of choice: The subject's view on intervention can also influence the occurrence of countercontrol.

== Implications and importance ==
Countercontrol can have an effect on intervention strategies by minimizing instructional time while increasing program expense. Mary B.; Robert, Suppa J.; Sharon, Schoen F.; Roberts, Suzanne R (1984). "Countercontrol: An issue in Intervention". Rase. 5:38-40.

- Human freedom or free will; Countercontrolling behavior as a marker of freedom (Elimination of aversive behavior is a measure of human freedom, hence reduced occurrence of countercontrol is, to an extent, a measure of freedom).
- Social Control: Importance of avenues of effective countercontrol since institutions of social control such as religion, government, and education rely heavily on aversive control. These avenues will be available if control is conspicuous and if there is a balance between control and countercontrol. Understanding countercontrol in a classroom setting and implementing cooperation among students and teachers might be helpful to the classroom environment and countercontrol may help in understanding chronic behavior problems.
- Control of environment countercontrol provides a way to analyze how behavers control the environment. (The foundation for countercontrol is that human behavior is both a function of the environment and a source of control over it.)
- Bullying: Countercontrol can help to direct efforts to the specific sources of socially mediated aversive control. With countercontrol, behavior analysts can also highlight positive contributions of a behavioral approach by recognizing that everyone has the potential to overcome socially based aversive attempts at control.
- Teaching and parenting: In cases involving noncompliance, malicious destruction, and opposition, countercontrol can identify sources of aversive control (e.g. Students who countercontrol teachers or children who countercontrol parents).
- Design of cultures: Institutions of social control such as religion, government and education rely heavily on aversive control. This accounts for many of the unfavorable countercontrolling reactions individuals and groups have had to aspects of their culture.
- Documenting previous interventions is a good practice as it may uncover patterns of student response such as the preferred mode of instruction or the effective reinforcers. Such information can help plan an intervention that will minimize countercontrol.

The key to reducing the occurrence of countercontrol is to work hard at reducing the degree to which we try to control students' actions.

Countercontrol is mentioned in About Behaviorism. It is also mentioned in Skinner's Technology of Teacher.
