= Nathan Whetten =

American sociologist and academic administrator

Nathan Laselle Whetten
- Born: July 20, 1900; Chihuahua, Mexico
- Died: June 26, 1984 (aged 83); Willimantic, Connecticut, US

Nathan Laselle Whetten (July 20, 1900 – June 26, 1984) was an American academic who served as professor of sociology (1932–1971) and dean of the Graduate School at the University of Connecticut (1940–1970). UConn's Nathan L. Whetten Graduate School was named in his honor in 1971.

== Biography ==
Whetten was born on July 20, 1900, in Colonia García, a Mormon colony in Chihuahua, Mexico. His Anglo-American parents ran a cattle ranch. They moved back to Arizona in 1912 during the Mexican Revolution, returning to Mexico in 1914, where Whetten attended high school in Ciudad Juárez.

Whetten earned his bachelor's degree in languages in 1926 and his master's degree in sociology in 1928, both from Brigham Young University. After teaching at BYU and the University of Minnesota, he earned his doctorate in sociology from Harvard University in 1932. In fall 1932, Whetten began his postdoctoral career as a statistician in the University of Connecticut's sociology department, at the time part of the Storrs Agricultural Experiment Station. He led the first study of suburbanization in Connecticut, focusing on the communities of Windsor, Wilton and Norwich. He was promoted to assistant professor of rural sociology in 1935 and to full professor and sociology department chair in 1938. Whetten also served as an editor of Rural Sociology and president of the Eastern Sociological Society and of the New England Conference on Graduate Education.

Starting in the 1940s, Whetten's research interests shifted toward Latin American studies. From 1942 to 1945, he and his family lived in Mexico City, where he was on temporary assignment to the United States Department of State and the Office of Foreign Agricultural Relations. He was charged with studying rural society in countries that provided raw materials (e.g., rubber) for the US war effort. He later conducted multi-month research trips to Guatelama in 1944, 1952, and 1955. Guatemala: The Land and the People (1961) and Rural Mexico (1948) were products of these expeditions.

In 1940, Albert N. Jorgensen appointed Whetten the first Dean of the Graduate School, succeeding George C. White as coordinator of postgraduate education. As dean, Whetten oversaw all graduate degrees and courses offered by hundreds of faculty and dozens of departments. During his three-decade tenure, the Graduate School grew from nine master's and doctoral degree recipients in 1941 to 1075 in 1970. He retired on July 1, 1970. In November 1971, UConn's board of trustees voted to name the center for Whetten—the first time a building was named for a living person.

Whetten married Theora Lucile Johnson (1904–2004) of Salt Lake City in 1926. They met in college. Whetten lived in Storrs from 1932 until he died at a care home in Willimantic, Connecticut, on June 26, 1984. He was 83 years old. He was survived by his wife and two sons, Nathan and John.

In 1998, Theora Whetten donated 24 acres of undeveloped land to Joshua's Trust, which now forms part of the Nate and Theora Whetten Woods nature preserve. She also created the Homer Babbidge Library's Whetten Endowment to purchase research materials on Latin America.

== Publications ==
- Guatemala: The Land and the People (Yale University Press, 1961)
- Rural Mexico (University of Chicago Press, 1948; translated into Spanish in 1953)
- With Henry W. Riecken, Rural Social Organization in Litchfield County, Connecticut (Storrs Agricultural Experiment Station, 1948)
- With Arnold W. Green, Ethnic Group Relations in a Rural Area of Connecticut (Storrs Agricultural Experiment Station, 1943)
- With Henry W. Riecken, The Foreign-Born Population of Connecticut (Storrs Agricultural Experiment Station, 1940)
- With Carle C. Zimmerman, Rural Families on Relief (Works Progress Administration, 1938)
- With Edward C. Devereux and Raymond F. Field, Studies of Suburbanization in Connecticut (Storrs Agricultural Experiment Station, 1936–1939)
- With Victor A. Rapport, The Recreational Uses of Land in Connecticut (Storrs Agricultural Experiment Station, 1934)
