= Carle C. Zimmerman =

American sociologist

Carle Clark Zimmerman
- Born: April 10, 1897; Cass County, Missouri, U.S.
- Died: February 7, 1983 (aged 85)
- Education: University of Missouri; North Carolina State University; University of Minnesota
- Occupation: Sociologist
- Employer: Harvard University
- Spouse: Medeline Andrist

Carle Clark Zimmerman (April 10, 1897 – February 7, 1983) was an American sociologist, and an inaugural member of Harvard University's Department of Sociology.

Zimmerman's masterpiece was Family and Civilization. His work was not widely accepted in the discipline of sociology and is largely forgotten. Zimmerman's contribution to the field of sociology has been the stages of decline, corruption and social disintegration associated with the collapse of civilization. Zimmerman also showed that they appear in the family structure and what appearing in the family structure can mean.

== Life and career ==
Carle Clark Zimmerman was born into a German-American family on April 10, 1897, in Cass County, Missouri. Both of his parents were professional school teachers, though his father eventually secured more remunerative work as a rural mail carrier. In 1914, Zimmerman began attending Westminster College in Fulton, Missouri, as an undergraduate. His studies were interrupted by two unrelated family tragedies. First, in 1915, his brother died from injuries sustained during an automobile accident. Then, the next year, his father sustained serious injuries while interacting with a wild horse. Both events negatively impacted Zimmerman's performance at school.

In order to make up for lost time, he enrolled in classes at the University of Missouri during the summer of 1916, where one of his professors, Luther Lee Bernard, introduced him to the discipline of sociology. In the fall of 1916, Zimmerman transferred full-time to the University of Missouri to complete his undergraduate work in sociology. However, his studies were interrupted again when he was drafted into the United States Army infantry during World War I. He achieved the rank of sergeant but never saw combat. In order to support himself after his discharge in 1919, Zimmerman undertook a study of shorthand and typing, which he completed in January 1920. That same year, he returned to the University of Missouri to work as a secretary for the head of the sociology department, Charles A. Ellwood. Although he had not yet completed his undergraduate work, Ellwood made him his teaching assistant after only one day on the job.

In 1920, Zimmerman enrolled in North Carolina State College, where he spent three years studying with Charles C. Taylor, one of his former professors from the University of Missouri, with whom he also lived and worked during this time. During his first year at North Carolina State, Zimmerman acted as Taylor's assistant and participated in a group that traveled around with a projector, bringing motion pictures to rural communities in Wake County, North Carolina. He used the firsthand observations he gathered during this time to write an ethnography of the region, which was eventually published with Taylor as a co-author under the title Rural Organization: A Study of Primary Groups in Wake County, N.C. (1922), a short work that came to be considered a classic in the field of rural sociology. During his second year at North Carolina State, he worked part-time as an instructor in economics and sociology and did much of the fieldwork for Taylor's study on the conditions of farmers in North Carolina, which was published under the title Economic and Social Conditions of North Carolina Farmers. In his third year, he was employed by the Tobacco Growers Association of Virginia, North Carolina, and South Carolina. In 1922, under Taylor's supervision, he completed a master's thesis titled "Standards of Living of North Carolina Farmers".

Zimmerman determined to pursue his Ph.D. in 1923 and began taking classes at the University of Chicago, where he studied under Robert E. Park and Ellsworth Faris for a semester in the summer. He transferred to the University of Minnesota in the fall of that year on recommendation from his former teacher at the University of Missouri, L.L. Bernard. Bernard introduced Zimmerman to John D. Black, an economic statistician at the University of Minnesota, who would go on to direct Zimmerman's dissertation, and for whom Zimmerman acted as a research assistant. He completed the requirements for his Ph.D. in 1925.

Near the end of his time at the University of Minnesota, Zimmerman conducted a seminar on rural sociology with Pitirim Sorokin, a Russian exile and sociologist with whom Zimmerman became a frequent collaborator and close friend. Along with Sorokin and Talcott Parsons, Zimmerman was a founding member of the Department of Sociology at Harvard University. The department was created in 1931. Zimmerman joined in 1932 and was tenured in 1933. During his time at Harvard, he lived next door to Sorokin in Winchester, Massachusetts.

Over the course of his career, he conducted fieldwork studying the family in Japan, China, Siam, Cuba, Mexico, and Europe, as well as in most of the American States. He served as a major in the United States Air Corps during World War II.

Zimmerman met Medeline Andrist while at the University of Minnesota. They married in 1925 and had three children together. He remained at Harvard until he retired in 1963 but continued publishing works on sociology into the 1970s. He lived in a restored farmhouse near Laconia, New Hampshire, with his wife until his death in 1983.

== Bibliography ==
- Marriage and the Family: A Text for Moderns, 1956
- Family and Civilization (with Lucius F. Cervantes), 1947, A review of family structure throughout human history. ISBN 978-1933859378
- Rural Families on Relief (with Nathan Whetten), 1939 ISBN 978-1341955501
- The Changing Community, 1938
- Family and Society: A Study of the Sociology of Reconstruction (with Merle E. Frampton), 1937
- Consumption and Standards of Living, 1936
- Siam Rural Economic Survey 1930-31, 1932, ISBN 978-9747534023
- Principles of Rural-Urban Sociology (1929, with Pitirim Sorokin) New York : H. Holt. Preface: "a summary of Source book in rural sociology," in three volumes, prepared under the auspices of the U.S. Dept. of Agriculture and the University of Minnesota, to be published in 1930 or 1931"
