= Sociology of Revolution =

1925 book by Pitirim Sorokin

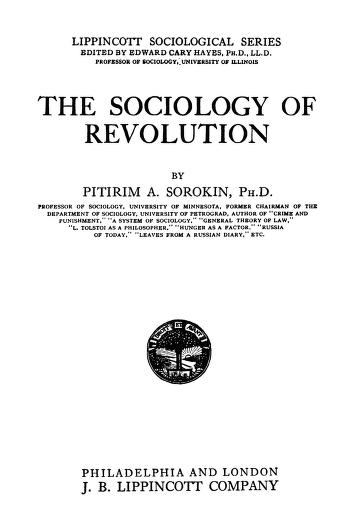
- Author: Pitirim Sorokin
- Publisher: J. B. Lippincott Company
- Publication date: 1925

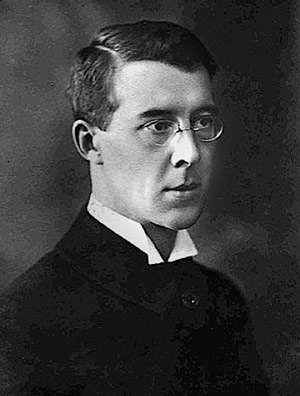
Pitirim Aleksandrovich Sorokin

Sociology of Revolution is a 1925 book by Russian American sociologist Pitirim Sorokin. The book was conceived by Sorokin during the Russian Civil War from 1917–1922. Sorokin wrote the book while in Czechoslovakia, after being banished from Russia. It reflected a contemporary trend in social science scholarship to present history as a form of natural science, with particular laws, patterns, and themes. Sorokin presented a "cyclical theory of civilizational change" through Sociology of Revolution. The book was published in the United States in 1925. The book was well received for the insights it provided about the events of the Russian Revolution.

== Sorokin's analysis of revolution ==
Sorokin wrote that his approach to the analysis of revolution was based on having lived "in the circle of the Russian Revolution" for a period of five years. Sorokin argued that contemporaries rather than "descendants" are "the best observers and judges of historical events", suggesting that he saw a similar precedence in natural sciences where "direct experience has long been preferred". Sorokin suggested that the writing of historical accounts based on documentary evidence is "very unsatisfactory" and that historians studying events "some generations after" are prone to "the errors of a foreigner observing from a distance".

He described his approach as being "like a naturalist", in the sense that he could "observe, analyze, and study" revolution through his proximity. Sorokin differentiated his approach from historians, who he saw as providing "a strict description of a concrete historical event in all its individuality and unrepeated singularity". By comparison, Sorokin argued that his goal - and the goal of his vision of sociological practice - was to develop a generalized typology of revolution, as with any social phenomena.

In following this approach, Sorokin made connections between the writing of a social scientific account of revolution and the development of other "causal relations" by scientists such as Newton, Mendel, or Avogadro - arguing that "the historical process though unrepeated as a whole is woven out of repeated elements". Sorokin characterised his view of history as containing a "great many similarities" that "are repeated" even though it may involve "different actors amidst the different scenery".

Sorokin described the object of his book as providing "the fundamental traits of what is styled as revolution" through attention to "a series of revolutions of different times and peoples", based on a survey of revolutions in Russia, France, Germany, England, Egypt, and Persia.

=== Structure of the book and definitions of revolution ===
Sorokin defined revolution as "a change in the behavior of the people on the one hand and their psychology, ideology, beliefs and valuations on the other". He developed this claim in the first part of the book. Sorokin further argued that "revolution signifies a change in the biologic composition of population, and of the reproductive and selective processes in its midst". He expanded on this claim in the second part of the book. Sorokin suggested that "revolution represents the deformation of the social structure of society", which he addressed in the third part of the book. Further, Sorokin claimed that "revolution means the change of fundamental social processes", which he elaborated on in the fourth part of the book.

=== Sorokin's account of humanity ===
Sorokin argued that "man resembles a wild colt tamed and harnessed", explaining that in his view "the balance between man's actions and his psychology" is a result of socialization. He compared humanity to a volcano, arguing that humanity's "inner fire" has been covered by "an always thickening coat" of what he called "culture lava". Sorokin compared the development of a revolution to the "eruption of a volcano", arguing that if "cracks and bursts" appear in social forms and conditions, then humanity reverts to "the fire of biological impulses".

Sorokin argues that with the breakdown of social conditions, humanity resembles "a wild animal, devil-possessed" and that it involves formerly peaceful persons becoming "a murderer", "a thief", or "a profligate". Sorokin conceptualized "police institutions" and "justice courts" along with their use of "the gallows and prisons" as being able to "extinguish the fires and explosions of human conduct".

Sorokin characterized the process of revolution as "biologization", where humanity's "biologic tendencies" come to "manifest themselves in their most extreme and 'sadistic' form" because of how revolutionary periods lead to the "extinction of the restraining habits" generated by social norms and conditions.

=== Sorokin's evaluation of revolution ===
Sorokin contrasted his analysis of the "real nature of revolution" from the "romantic representations of it" which he associated with "apologists" for revolution. Early in the text, Sorokin states that "revolution is a bad method for the improvement of the material and spiritual conditions of the masses". He suggested that while revolution promises "the realization of many of the greatest values" instead it "leads as often and as much to opposite results".

Sorokin argued that the benefits of revolution are "purchased at a prodigious and disproportionate cost" which he saw as punishing and degrading "the poor and working classes" who hope for change through revolution. Sorokin classified revolution as a "dangerous illness", and described it as a product of "hate, bestiality, and mad struggle". Overall, Sorokin described himself as a "reactionary" because of his opposition to revolution.

=== Sorokin's preference for reform over revolution ===
Sorokin argued that his view of "the history of social progress" demonstrates that "all fundamental and really progressive acquisitions" have not come from revolution, but "been the results of knowledge, peace, solidarity, cooperation and love". In Sociology of Revolution, Sorokin set out four precepts which he referred to as "principal canons" which provided a checklist for progressive development in society. Sorokin's principal canons were:

- "A reform must not violate human nature and contradict its fundamental instincts"
- "An attentive study of concrete social conditions has to precede every practical realization of reform in them"
- "Every reconstructive experiment at first must be tested on a small scale. Only when it gives a positive result is it possible to realize it on a greater scale."
- "Reforms have to be realized only by legal and constitutional means."

Sorokin argued that failure to adhere to these principal canons would make attempts at social reconstruction unsuccessful. Returning to his presentation of his analytic method as a kind of natural science, Sorokin characterised his principal canons as being similar to what was "applied for example at the construction of a bridge or the improving of a breed of cows".

== Reception ==
John Grierson, reviewing Sociology of Revolution on its publication in 1925, wrote that the "chief value of the book is in its first-hand Russian material". Grierson suggested that Sorokin was "emotionally susceptible" in writing the book and "allows his temper to get the better of him" and that consequently "his scientific judgement tends accordingly to be a little clouded". In particular, Grierson critiqued Sorokin's portrayal of the Bolsheviks, Lenin, and Trotsky in the book. Grierson summarised that: "The book, however, contains so much interesting material that the student of social psychology will find it valuable".

William Eckhardt described the theory expressed in Sorokin's book as being "a frustration theory", and remarked that while it "was a nice combination of Freudian and Marxist theories" Sorokin "abhorred the theories of both Marx and Freud". Eckhardt saw Sorokin as contrasting with Marx by having "sided with the upper classes" and contrasting with Freud by having "sided with the ego instincts" instead of the sex instincts that he saw Freud as siding with.

Robert E. Park regarded Sorokin's Sociology of Revolution as part of a wider social scientific trend "to write history in terms of a natural science", with Sorokin describing "what is general and typical in the phenomena of revolution in general" through his case study. Park saw Sorokin's method as "stating general theses and then marshaling facts to support them", extrapolating from his "personal experiences" and "wide reading in history" to produce "a natural history of revolutions". Park summarised the work as "not an easy nor interesting book to read", suggesting that it was most useful for "those who are eager for facts to discredit communism as an economic and political idea".

Alex Simirenko situated Sorokin's Sociology of Revolution within Sorokin's overarching practice of using data "as a means for confirming his personal apocalyptic vision" and his "synthetic" approach which aimed at producing "a general statement on the history of mankind". Simirenko summarised Sorokin's intellectual project as being concerned with a "cyclical theory of civilizational change", suggesting that Sorokin "conceived of civilizations as undergoing a pendulum-like change from a sensate to an ideational culture and back again" with revolution figuring as an expression of this cycle.

== See also ==
- Social conflict
- Social revolution
