= Stephen G. Post =

American author and academic

Stephen Garrard Post (1951-; PhD University of Chicago, 1983) has served on the Board of the John Templeton Foundation (2008–2014), which focuses on virtue and public life. He is a researcher, opinion leader, medical school professor, and best-selling author who has taught at the University of Chicago Medical School, Fordham University-Marymount, Case Western Reserve University School of Medicine (1988–2008) and Stony Brook University School of Medicine (2008–). He is widely known for his research on the ways in which giving can enhance the health and happiness of the giver, how empathy and compassionate care contribute to patient outcomes, ethical issues in caring for people with dementia, medical professionalism and the virtues, and positive psychology in relation to health and well-being. Post is an elected member of the College of Physicians of Philadelphia, the New York Academy of Medicine, and the Royal Society of Medicine, London. He was selected nationally as the Public Member of the United States Medical Licensing Examination (USMLE) Composite Committee (2000–2005), and was reappointed for outstanding contributions.

His book The Moral Challenge of Alzheimer Disease: Ethical Issues from Diagnosis to Dying (Johns Hopkins University Press, 2nd edition 2000) was designated a "medical classic of the century" by the British Medical Journal, which wrote (2009), "Until this pioneering work was published in 1995 the ethical aspects of one of the most important illnesses of our aging populations were a neglected topic." He is an elected member of the Medical and Scientific Advisory Panel of Alzheimer's Disease International. Post is one of several recipients of the U.S. Alzheimer's Association "distinguished service award" for his work with family and professional caregivers over three decades. Post's culminating book in this field is Dignity for Deeply Forgetful People: How Caregivers Can Meet the Challenges of Alzheimer's Disease (Johns Hopkins University Press, 2022).

Post wrote the 2011 WSJ best-selling book The Hidden Gifts of Helping: How the Power of Giving, Compassion, and Hope Can Get Us Through Hard Times. He was lead author of the 2007 Why Good Things Happen to Good People: How to Live a Longer, Healthier, Happier Life by the Simple Act of Giving. His writings were included in Best American Spiritual Writing (2005). Post received the Kama Book Award in Medical Humanities from World Literacy Canada (2008), and was listed in the "Best Spiritual Books of 2011" by Spirituality & Practice. Articles by or about him have been published in Parade (magazine), O: The Oprah Magazine, The New York Times, and Psychology Today. He has appeared on many major media venues, including 20/20, The Daily Show, Stossel, and Nightline. To capture the theme of synchronicity, which fascinated Post since youth, he wrote God and Love on Route 80: The Hidden Mystery of Human Connectedness (Mango Publishing Group, 2019).

The author of several hundred papers in leading professional journals including JAMA, Science, Annals of Internal Medicine, The Journal of Religion, and The American Journal of Psychiatry, his article "Rx It's Good to be Good (G2BG): Prescribing Volunteerism for Health, Happiness, Resilience, and Longevity" won the 2017 Paper of the Year Award from the editors of The American Journal of Health Promotion.

== Education and personal life ==
Post attended St. Paul's School in New Hampshire. Post completed his PhD in 1983 at the University of Chicago "with distinction". He is a lifelong member of the Episcopal Church and the father of two adult children.

== Academic work ==
Post currently serves as Director of the Center for Medical Humanities, Compassionate Care, and Bioethics at Stony Brook University in the Stony Brook Renaissance School of Medicine, with a focus on professional identity development. In 2019 Stony Brook received the annual Alpha Omega Alpha Professionalism Award for development of its Professional Identity Formation Curriculum. Prior to his arrival at Stony Brook University, he was (1988–2008) Professor of Medical Ethics, Social Science, and Religious Studies in the School of Medicine at Case Western Reserve University. He was also a member of the Center For Adolescent Health in the Case School of Medicine, Directed by Nobel Laureate Frederick C. Robbins, MD. Post served as editor-in-chief of the 5-volume 3rd edition of The Encyclopedia of Bioethics (Macmillan Reference, 2004) while at Case Western. At the Center for Medical Humanities, Compassionate Care, and Bioethics Post and colleagues address the crisis of the dehumanization of healthcare and examine the perennial importance of compassionate care in the art of healing and the experience of recovery. He is an elected fellow of the Hastings Center and a senior scholar of the Kennedy Institute of Ethics at Georgetown University. Post is a senior research fellow (non-resident) in the Center for Law and Religion in the School of Law of Emory University, and a visiting scholar (non-resident) in the Positive Psychology Center of the University of Pennsylvania.

Post served as senior research fellow in the Becket Institute at St. Hugh's College at Oxford University. In 2003 he was invited to become one of the Founding Fellows of the International Society for Science and Religion (ISSR), a multidisciplinary learned society based at Cambridge University. Founded in 2002, ISSR is the world's preeminent scholarly organization devoted to this intersection. The Society has about 200 Fellows, mostly from the physical and biological sciences, philosophy, history, and spirituality

Through the Institute for Research on Unlimited Love, an Ohio-based non-profit 501(c)(3) organization that Post founded in 2001 with support from his friend and mentor Sir John Templeton, he was able to competitively fund research at more than sixty universities on the science of unselfish giving and its underpinnings in philosophy and spiritual wisdom. He has examined the dynamic of benevolence with regard to the happiness and health of the caregiver. For this work Post received the Hope in Healthcare Award for "pioneering research and education in the field of unconditional love, altruism, compassion, and service" (2008), and the "Pioneer Medal For Outstanding Leadership in Health Care" presented by the Trustees of HealthCare Chaplaincy Network (2012). His writings also address the roles of humility, spirituality and helping others in 12-Step recovery programs.

== Awards and honors ==
- 2017 Paper of the Year Award from the Editors of the American Journal of Health Promotion for "Rx It's Good to be Good"
- Elected Hastings Center Fellow 1994
- Senior Scholar in the Kennedy Institute of Ethics at Georgetown University
- Elected Member of the College of Physicians of Philadelphia for "distinguished contributions to medicine in 2003.
- Elected Fellow of the New York Academy of Medicine
- Elected Fellow of the Royal Society of Medicine, London
- 2008 Hope in Healthcare Award
- 2008 Kama Book Award in Medical Humanities from World Literacy Canada

== Bibliography ==
Stephen Post is the author and editor of numerous books including:

- The Moral Challenge of Alzheimer Disease: Ethical Issues from Diagnosis to Dying (Johns Hopkins, 1995)
- Encyclopedia of Bioethics 3rd ed. (MacMillan, 2003)
- The Fountain of Youth: Cultural, Scientific, and Ethical Perspectives on a Biomedical Goal (Oxford University Press, 2004).
- "Altruism & Health: Perspectives from Empirical Research" (Oxford University Press, 2007)
- "Why Good Things Happen to Good People: How to Live a Longer, Healthier, Happier Life by the Simple Act of Giving" (Broadway, 2008)
- "God and Love on Route 80: The Hidden Mystery of Human Connectedness" (Mango Publishing Group, a division of Mango Media, Inc., 2019)
