= Kuratov =

Opera by Sergei Noskov

Kuratov (Komi/Russian: Куратов) is an opera by the composer Serge Noskov. It was the first ever opera in the Komi language. It received its premiere at the State Opera House, Syktyvkar, the chief city of the Komi Republic, in the Russian Federation on 2 October 2009.

In 2008, Noskov began to rework an unpublished verse libretto by Albert Vaneev, originally written in 1984 and based on the life of the major Komi poet Ivan Kuratov. It focused on Kuratov's career as a teacher in Ust-Sysolsk in the 1860s, where he promoted Komi culture in the face of opposition from the local Russophile and tsarist authorities. The long gap between the composition of the libretto and the score is explained by the fact it was very difficult to find a composer sufficiently fluent in Komi. Noskov felt he had to adapt the libretto for several reasons: there was hardly any action; it contained anti-clerical sentiments associated with the former Soviet regime which were no longer relevant; and most of the audience, even in the Komi Republic, was more at ease speaking Russian than Komi. Noskov's solution to these problems was to extend the action to cover Kuratov's childhood as well as his old age in Kazakhstan and to translate parts of the text into Russian. The premiere was produced by Ija Bobrakova; it was difficult to find performers with sufficient command of Komi to sing the roles and some had to have the words with them on stage.

== Sources ==
- Cagnoli, Sébastien (2010). "Un opéra national komi au XXIe siècle". In Toulouze, Eva; Cagnoli, Sébastien (eds.). Les Komis: Questions d'histoire et de culture. Paris: Presses de l’Inalco. ISBN 978-2-85831-265-8.
