= Feoktista Ivanovna Zaboeva =

Russian teacher, folklorist and translator (1850–1943)

Feoktista Ivanovna Zaboeva (1850–1943) was a Russian teacher, folklorist and translator who worked among her Komi people. She collected Zyryan language fairy tales, riddles, proverbs and songs, which were later preserved and published.

== Biography ==
Feoktista Ivanovna was born 28 November 1850 in Ust-Sysolsk (now Syktyvkar, Russia), to a merchant family whose parents were famous Komi-Zyryans. Her father, Ivan Nazarovich, was well known to city residents as he maintained a postal station, performed elective free services while working in the city administration and held honorary positions there. For a long time, Ivan Nazarovich was an assistant to the city mayor, Mikhail Nikolaevich Latkin, and then he became the mayor of Ust-Sysolsk. As mayor, his family hosted many officials who came from Vologda, Veliky Ustyug, Arkhangelsk, St. Petersburg and other cities, and some visitors lived in his house for a long time.

Her mother, Anna Stepanovna Lytkina, was the sister of the Komi language researcher Georgy Lytkin. Feoktista Ivanovna, the fifth of 12 children, graduated from the Ust-Sysolsk parish school, the women's secondary school (1868–1872), and then the teachers' courses in Sovdor in 1872.

=== Teacher ===
In the 1860s and early 1870s, the need for more educational institutions in the Russian Empire increased and many more teachers were required. Educated civilians were asked to work at area schools and Feoktista Ivanovna responded, influenced by her sister Elizaveta Ivanovna who headed the girls' school. In 1872, Feoktista Ivanovna passed the exams and earned the title of rural teacher. She began teaching at the boys' school in the village of Vylgort and taught there for 26 years. Kallistrat Zhakov and Vasily Nalimov were among her students.

The school's students came from the village of Vylgort as well as from nearby villages and hamlets. The building was dark and cold because it was the former village justice department. She conducted school lessons in Russian, even though the children had rarely heard Russian spoken; all the students were Zyryans of the peasant class and knew only the Zyryan language of their fathers. Later, Feoktista Ivanovna noted the circumstances of rural life for her students, "... they came in tattered old zipunishki and torn shoes and stayed at the school overnight."

In 1898, a women's school was opened in Vylgort and Feoktista Ivanovna worked there for 10 years. Before retiring, she taught at the Davskaya mixed school in the Vylgort for her last four years.

=== Translator ===
Feoktista Ivanovna was actively involved in many educational activities. She translated textbooks into the Komi language, sought to facilitate the education of Komi children, translated Russian fairy tales, poems, stories, songs for extracurricular reading, and translated some texts from the Bible and the Gospel into the Komi language. In 1900, she translated the book "The Beginnings of Christian Doctrine" from Russian into Komi-Zyryan.

=== Folklorist ===
She collected Zyryan fairy tales, riddles, proverbs and songs and Komi folklore at the request of her uncle Georgy Lytkin, including memoirs by Ivan Kuratov about life in her birthplace of Ust-Sysolsk in the 19th century. The Komi writer and historian P.G. Doronin published her collected narratives in the magazine "Voyvyv kodzuv." In 1939, she gave him the preserved poems of the Komi poet Pyotr Klochkov, which were later published in the magazine "Voyvyv kodzuv" in 1961. At the request of Doronin, she wrote her recollections of her life for the 100th anniversary of the poet Ivan Kuratov. At that time, she was almost 90 years old. Her papers and photographs, contained in four units of storage, are kept in the Archive of the Indigenous Peoples of the Komi Republic.

=== Final years ===
After she retired in 1912, Feoktista Ivanovna continued to advise her former students, help them financially and remain a sensitive listener to the children, although she lived in a very difficult financial situation. In 1912, in connection with her retirement, she was assigned a "pension in the amount of 751 rubles 9 kopecks," but even that small amount was suspended in 1918 after the October Revolution.

She spent her last years in poverty yet she lived many more years. She died in the summer of 1943 at the age of 93 and was buried at the Vylgort Cemetery.

=== Honors ===
In 1914 she was awarded a gold medal "For Diligence." In connection with her forty years of teaching, the Ust-Sysolsk zemstvo assembly hung her portrait in the school in Vylgort.
