= Yb, Russia =

Yb Ыб
- Location within Russia
- Coordinates: 61°16′21″N 50°34′49″E
- Country: Russia
- Republic: Komi Republic
- Elevation: 99 m (325 ft)

Population
  - Total: 550
- Time zone: UTC+3 (Moscow Time)
  - Summer (DST): UTC+3 (Moscow Time)

Yb (Russian: Ыб, IPA: [ˈɨp]) is a rural locality (a selo) in the Komi Republic, in western Russia. It has a population of 550. It lies at an altitude of 99 m (325 ft). It lies next to the Sysola River and it lies between 30 km (19 mi) and 40 km (25 mi) south-southwest from the regional capital of Syktyvkar.
