= Respublikansky Stadion =

Sports arena in Syktyvkar, Russia

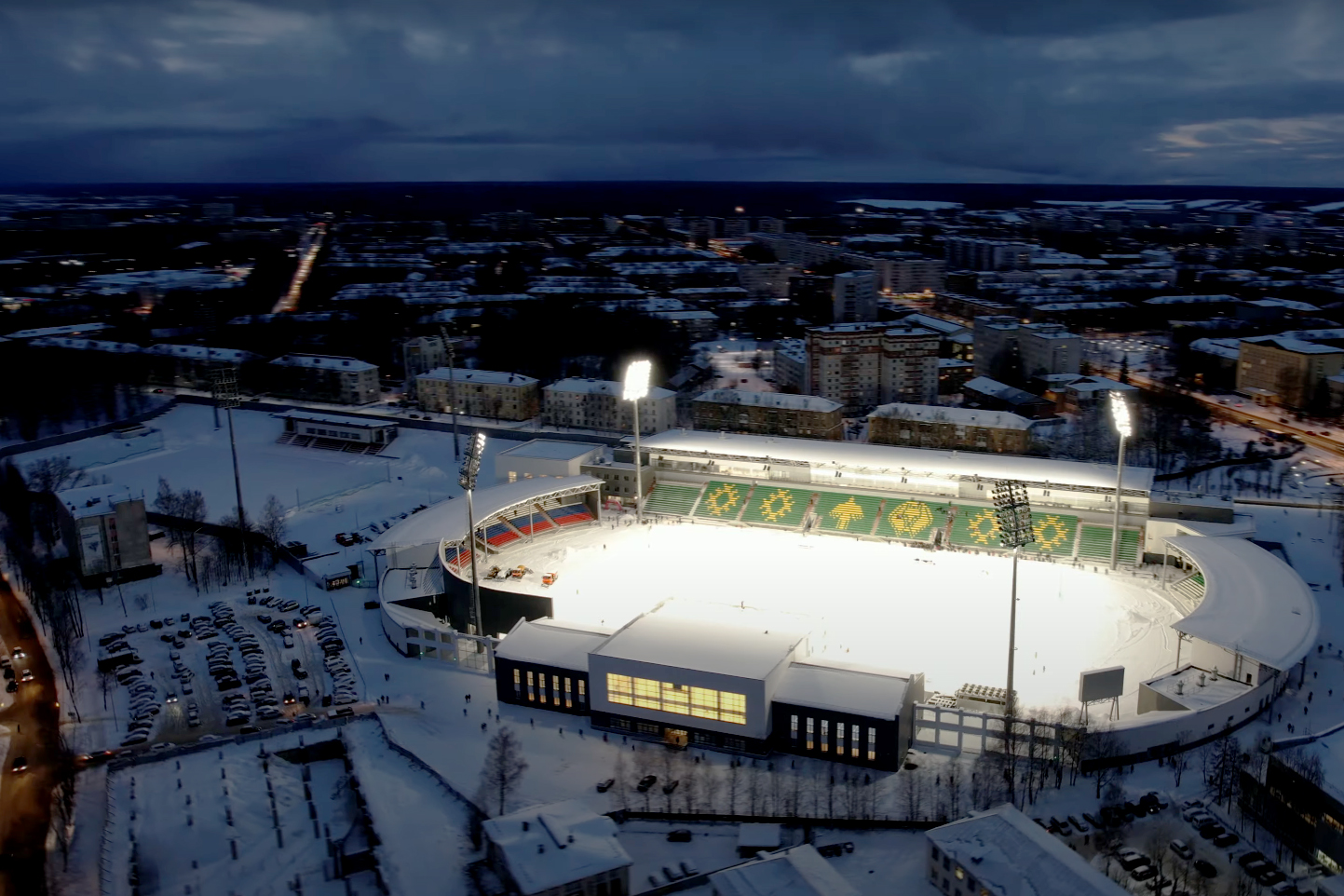
- Location: Syktyvkar, Komi Republic, Russia
- Capacity: 8,364 (main arena), 499 (training field)
- Surface: artificial grass, ice
- Field size: 110 x 70 m

Construction
- Opened: 1971
- Renovated: 2021

Respublikansky Stadion is a sports arena in Syktyvkar, capital of Komi Republic, Russia, which is used as the home ground for bandy club Stroitel, which plays in the Super League, first-tier of Russian professional bandy. The arena was inaugurated in 1971. The sports arena was reconstructed in 2021.
