= Stroitel Syktyvkar =

Russian bandy club in Syktyvkar, Komi Republic

Stroitel Строи́тель
- City: Syktyvkar, Russia
- League: Russian Bandy Super League
- Division: Subgroup 1
- Founded: 1947; 79 years ago
- Home arena: Respublikanskiy Stadion
- Head coach: Vyacheslav Evgenievich Mankos
- Website: Official website
Home colours	Away colours

Bandy Club Stroitel (Russian: Клуб по хоккею с мячом Строи́тель, romanized: Klub po khokkeyu s myachom Stroítel') is a Russian bandy club in the Russian Bandy Super League. They play in Syktyvkar, Komi Republic at the Respublikansky Stadion. The club was founded in 1947.

At the final tournament of the 2016–17 Russian Bandy Supreme League season, with two Super League tickets held in Syktyvkar, Stroitel won and was thus eligible for promotion. After discussions as to whether or not to accept, the team opted to return to the Russian Bandy Super League in the 2017–18 season after several years in the second-tier Supreme League. In the 2016–17 season, the club adopted a new logo, replacing an old one which featured a polar bear playing bandy.
