= Serge Noskov =

Russian composer

Serge Noskov (born 1956 in Syktyvkar, Komi Republic, Soviet Union) is a composer. In 1986 he graduated from Gorky (now Nizhny Novgorod) State Conservatoire as a composer, as well as a music theory and history teacher. His graduation compositions were: 1st Symphony for triple cast symphony orchestra, "Nonet" – chamber composition in three movements for 9 instruments, "Dreams" – vocal cycle for baritone and 4 instruments, set on his own poems. After the graduation, he returned to Syktyvkar, where he wrote the 1st String Quartet, "Psalms" for a choir a'capella on texts of a poem by Victor Savin in Komi language, and the Bible, musical "Ogorod", numerous songs with lyrics by Komi poets of 19th century, also, a few songs for a pop-group "Aski". His Komi songs for children were published by a Komi Publishing House. In 1992 he relocated to London. Since then he has written six Symphonies, a ballet "Zarny Kai", String Quartet No2, "Magic Mushroom" – chamber composition for an electronic synthesizer and a chamber orchestra, art-rock album "Mayakovsky Rocks", set on the lyrics by controversial Russian poet Vladimir Mayakovsky, "Diary of a Madman" – music for the drama by N.Gogol, soundtracks for several short films and jingles for TV adverts and theatre plays, "The Adventures of a Christmas Turkey" - a humorous composition in three movements for a symphony orchestra, "Bloody Men" - 7 songs for soprano with lyrics by Wendy Cope, and other numerous songs on lyrics by contemporary Komi, Russian and English poets. One of his latest works is the opera Kuratov in the Komi and Russian languages, which had its first performances on 2 and 3 October 2009 and since then has been included into the permanent repertoire of the State Opera and Ballet Theatre of Komi Republic, Russia.

In 2010 for his contribution and achievements in music Serge was awarded the Certificate of Merit by the Minister of Culture of Russian Federation. In 2011 he was awarded the Diploma of the State Prize Laureate of Komi Republic.

== Notes ==
- "Serge Noskov, profile".
- "Serge Noskov composer - Home page". Sergenoskov.ucoz.com.
- "композитор Сергей Носков - Home page". Sergeinoskov.ucoz.ru. in Russian.
- "Studio 17 - Home page". Sergeinoskov.ucoz.ru.
- "Лауреат высшей республиканской премии".
- "Première of Kuratov opera at Syktyvkar Opera and Ballet Theatre in October 2009 photoalbum". Foto11.com. in English (website about Komi culture)
- БНКоми - Композитор Сергей Носков: "Бизе, Шостакович и тут Носков, это так непривычно, странно" [BNKomi - Composer Sergei Noskov: "Bizet, Shostakovich and then Noskov, it is so unusual, strange"] (in Russian). Bnkomi.ru. in Russian (internet portal "Business News Komi)
- Сергей Носков: "Процесс сочинения не кончается никогда". Газета "Республика" №176 (7090) (Gazeta Respublika) (in Russian). Gazeta-respublika.ru. 2009-09-23. in Russian (newspaper "Respublica")
- "Куратов" превзошел ожидания. В Сыктывкаре состоялась премьера первой национальной оперы на коми языке ["Kuratov" exceeded expectations. In Syktyvkar premiere of the first national opera at the Komi language] (in Russian). Mskomi.ru. 2010-02-19. in Russia (newspaper "Molodyezh Severa")
- "На премьере "Куратова" театралы заспорили о том, сколько было написано коми национальных опер" [At the premiere of "Kuratova" theater began to argue about how much has been written Komi national operas]. Finugor.ru. 2009. (internet portal FU)
- 02 Окт 2009 (1999-02-22). Опера "Куратов" | Новости Сыктывкара - Сыктывкар Онлайн (in Russian). S-o-l.ru. in Russian (website "Syktyvkar on Line")
- "Serge Noskov". uk.linkedin.com.
