= Verkhnyaya Maksakovka =

Verkhnyaya Maksakovka Верхняя Максаковка
- Urban-type settlement

Other transcription(s)
  - Komi: Вылыс Максаковка
- Interactive map of Verkhnyaya Maksakovka
- Location of Verkhnyaya Maksakovka Verkhnyaya Maksakovka (Komi Republic)
- Coordinates: 61°38′N 50°58′E
- Country: Russia
- Federal subject: Komi Republic
- Urban-type settlement administrative territorySelsoviet: Verkhnyaya Maksakovka Urban-Type Settlement Administrative Territory
- Founded: 1950

Population (2010 Census)
  - Total: 4,198
  - Estimate (2025): 3,828 (−8.8%)

Administrative status
  - Subordinated to: city of republic significance of Syktyvkar
  - Capital of: Verkhnyaya Maksakovka Urban-Type Settlement Administrative Territory

Municipal status
  - Urban okrug: Syktyvkar Urban Okrug
- Time zone: UTC+3 (MSK)
- Postal code: 167905
- OKTMO ID: 87701000056
- Website: сыктывкар.рф/administration/administratsiya-pgt-verkhnyaya-maksakovka

Verkhnyaya Maksakovka population
- 2010 Census: 4,198
- 2002 Census: 4,026

Verkhnyaya Maksakovka (Russian: Верхняя Максаковка; Komi: Вылыс Максаковка, Vylys Maksakovka) is an urban locality (an urban-type settlement) under the administrative jurisdiction of the city of republic significance of Syktyvkar in the Komi Republic, Russia. As of the 2010 Census, its population was 4,198.

== History ==
In 1983–1990, Verkhnyaya Maksakovka was a microdistrict of Syktyvkar and did not exist as a standalone inhabited locality.

== Administrative and municipal status ==
Within the framework of administrative divisions, the urban-type settlement of Verkhnyaya Maksakovka, together with two rural localities, is incorporated as Verkhnyaya Maksakovka Urban-Type Settlement Administrative Territory, which is subordinated to the city of republic significance of Syktyvkar. Within the framework of municipal divisions, Verkhnyaya Maksakovka is a part of Syktyvkar Urban Okrug.
