= Krasnozatonsky =

Krasnozatonsky Краснозатонский
- Urban-type settlement

Other transcription(s)
  - Komi: Гӧрд Затон
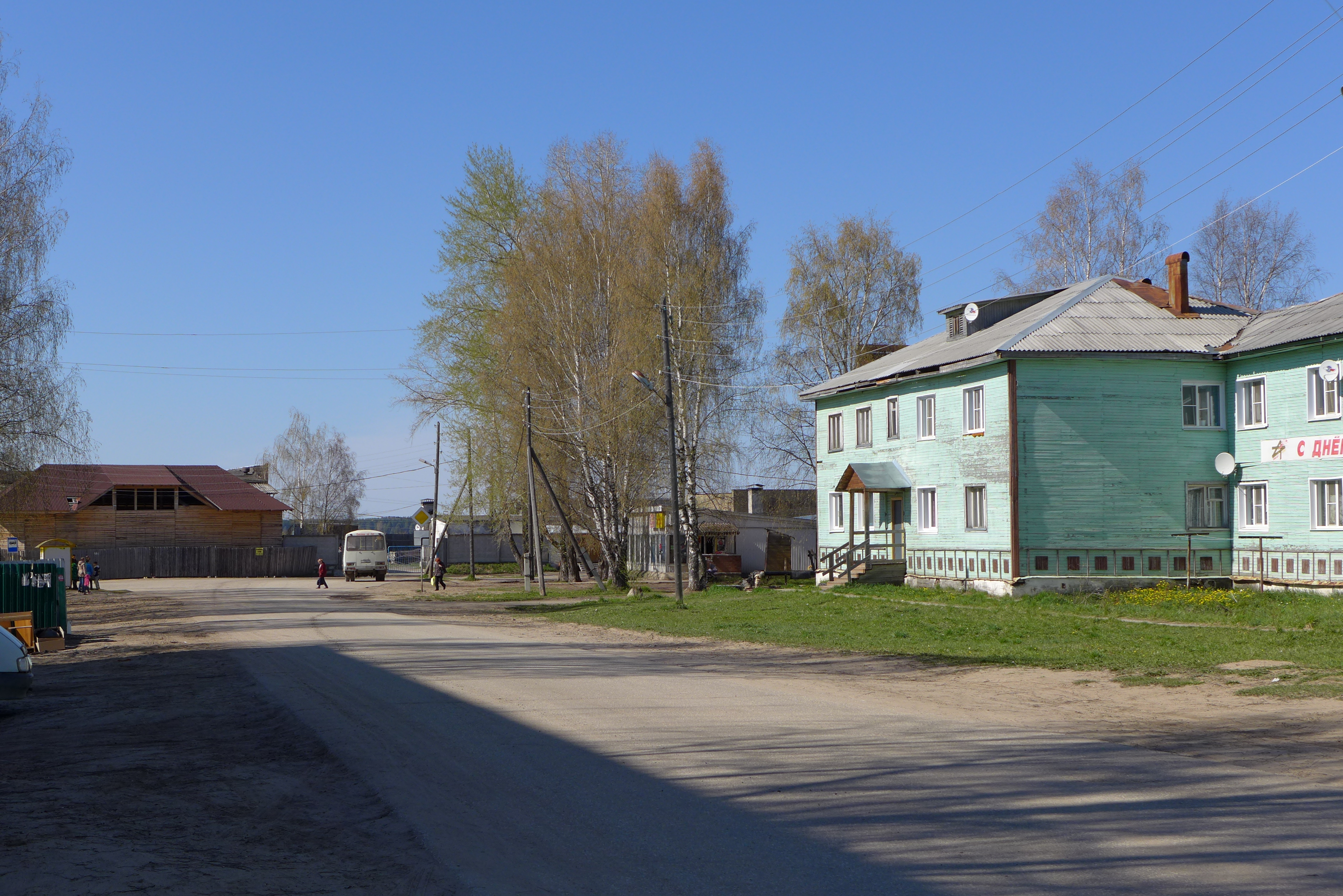
- Interactive map of Krasnozatonsky
- Location of Krasnozatonsky Krasnozatonsky (Komi Republic)
- Coordinates: 61°41′N 50°59′E
- Country: Russia
- Federal subject: Komi Republic
- Urban-type settlement administrative territorySelsoviet: Krasnozatonsky Urban-Type Settlement Administrative Territory
- Founded: 1930

Population (2010 Census)
  - Total: 8,603
  - Estimate (2025): 7,329 (−14.8%)

Administrative status
  - Subordinated to: city of republic significance of Syktyvkar
  - Capital of: Krasnozatonsky Urban-Type Settlement Administrative Territory

Municipal status
  - Urban okrug: Syktyvkar Urban Okrug
- Time zone: UTC+3 (MSK)
- Postal code: 167904
- OKTMO ID: 87701000061
- Website: сыктывкар.рф/administration/administratsiya-pgt-krasnozatonskij

Krasnozatonsky population
- 2010 Census: 8,603
- 2002 Census: 8,497
- 1979 Census: 11,894

Krasnozatonsky (Russian: Краснозатонский; Komi: Гӧрд Затон, Görd Zaton) is an urban locality (an urban-type settlement) under the administrative jurisdiction of the city of republic significance of Syktyvkar in the Komi Republic, Russia. As of the 2010 Census, its population was 8,603.

== History ==
In 1983–1990, Krasnozatonsky was a microdistrict of Syktyvkar and did not exist as a standalone inhabited locality.

== Administrative and municipal status ==
Within the framework of administrative divisions, the urban-type settlement of Krasnozatonsky is incorporated as Krasnozatonsky Urban-Type Settlement Administrative Territory, which is subordinated to the city of republic significance of Syktyvkar. Within the framework of municipal divisions, Krasnozatonsky is a part of Syktyvkar Urban Okrug.
