= Sedkyrkeshch =

Sedkyrkeshch Седкыркещ
- Urban-type settlement

Other transcription(s)
  - Komi: Сьӧдкыркӧтш
- Interactive map of Sedkyrkeshch
- Location of Sedkyrkeshch Sedkyrkeshch (Komi Republic)
- Coordinates: 61°44′N 50°58′E
- Country: Russia
- Federal subject: Komi Republic
- Urban-type settlement administrative territorySelsoviet: Sedkyrkeshch Urban-Type Settlement Administrative Territory

Population (2010 Census)
  - Total: 1,999
  - Estimate (2025): 1,286 (−35.7%)

Administrative status
  - Subordinated to: city of republic significance of Syktyvkar
  - Capital of: Sedkyrkeshch Urban-Type Settlement Administrative Territory

Municipal status
  - Urban okrug: Syktyvkar Urban Okrug
- Time zone: UTC+3 (MSK)
- Postal code: 167907
- OKTMO ID: 87701000066
- Website: сыктывкар.рф/administration/administratsiya-pgt-sedkyrkeshch

Sedkyrkeshch population
- 2010 Census: 1,999
- 2002 Census: 2,075
- 1989 Census: 2,412
- 1979 Census: 2,273

Sedkyrkeshch (Russian: Седкыркещ; Komi: Сьӧдкыркӧтш, Śodkyrköč) is an urban locality (an urban-type settlement) under the administrative jurisdiction of the city of republic significance of Syktyvkar in the Komi Republic, Russia. As of the 2010 Census, its population was 1,999.

== Administrative and municipal status ==
Within the framework of administrative divisions, the urban-type settlement of Sedkyrkeshch, together with one rural locality (the settlement of Trekhozerka), is incorporated as Sedkyrkeshch Urban-Type Settlement Administrative Territory, which is subordinated to the city of republic significance of Syktyvkar. Within the framework of municipal divisions, Sedkyrkeshch is a part of Syktyvkar Urban Okrug.
