= Sysola =

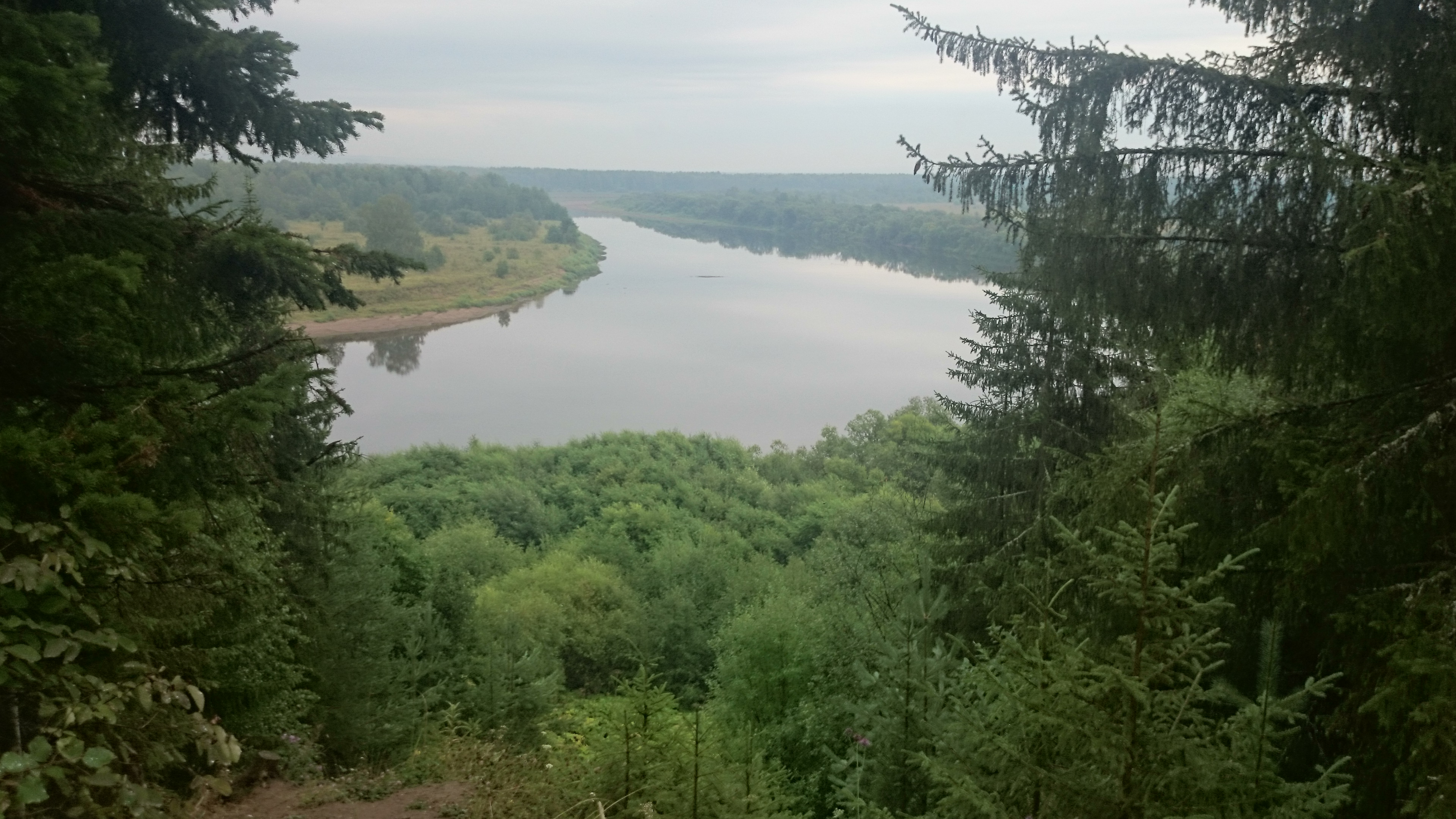
- The Sysola at the village of Yb
- Native name: Сысола (Russian); Сыктыв (Komi)

Location
- Country: Russia

Physical characteristics
- Mouth: Vychegda
  - coordinates: 61°41′15″N 50°50′32″E
- Length: 487 km (303 mi)
- Basin size: 17,200 km^{2} (6,600 sq mi)

Basin features
- Progression: Vychegda→ Northern Dvina→ White Sea

The Sysola (Russian: Сысола; Komi: Сыктыв, romanized: Syktyv) is a river located mainly in the Komi Republic in northwest Russia, although its two branches have their sources in Kirov Oblast and Perm Oblast. It is 487 kilometres (303 mi) long, and has a drainage basin of 17,200 square kilometres (6,600 sq mi). The Sysola is a tributary of the larger Vychegda, which it meets in Syktyvkar.
