= Ivan Kuratov =

Komi poet and linguist (1839–1875)

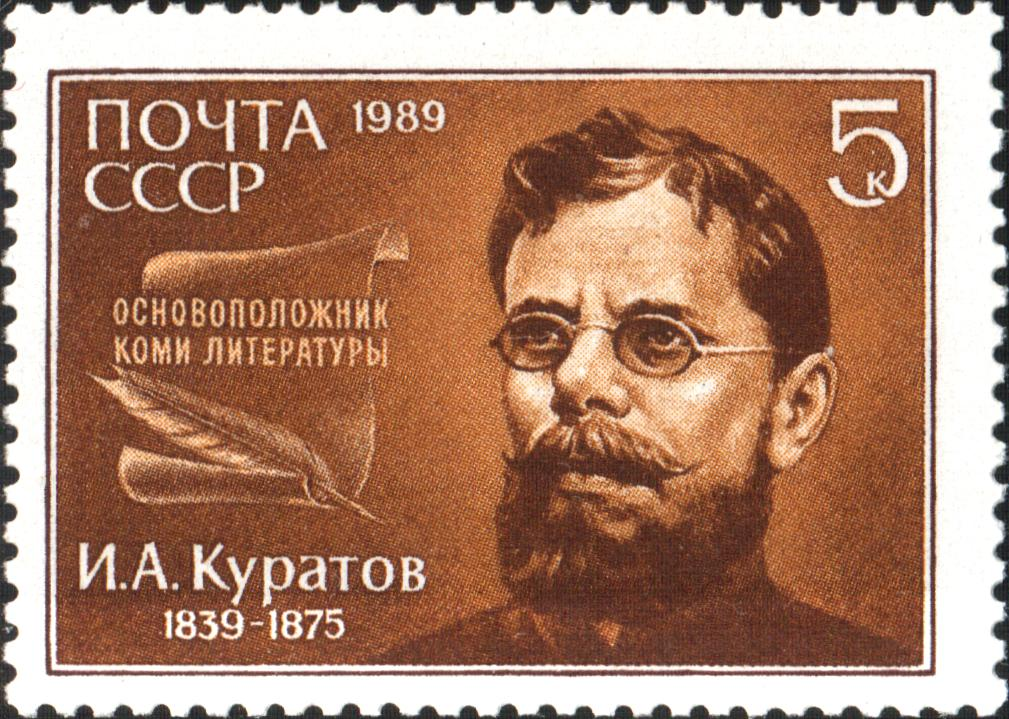
Founder of Komi literature Ivan Kuratov on a 1989 USSR commemorative stamp

Ivan Alekseevich Kuratov (Russian: Иван Алексеевич Куратов; Komi: Куратов Ӧльӧш Вань, Kuratov Öľöš Vań, 18 July [O.S. 6 July] 1839 in Kibra village, current Kuratovo village, Komi Republic — 29 November [O.S. 17 November] 1875 in Verny, current Almaty) was a Komi poet and linguist, seen as renovator of Komi literature.

Kuratov began writing verses at age 13, while studying in a seminary, and was engaged in poetry until his death. The most fruitful period of his life were the years spent in the town of Ust-Sysolsk, where Kuratov settled after unsuccessful attempt to continue his education in Moscow. Here he taught country children, worked on linguistics and wrote poetry. During his lifetime Ivan Kuratov published only five poems, under a pseudonym.

He is the subject of Serge Noskov's 2009 opera Kuratov, the first in the Komi language.
