= Syktyvkar =

City in the Komi Republic, Russia

Syktyvkar Сыктывкар
- City

Other transcription(s)
  - Komi: Сыктывкар
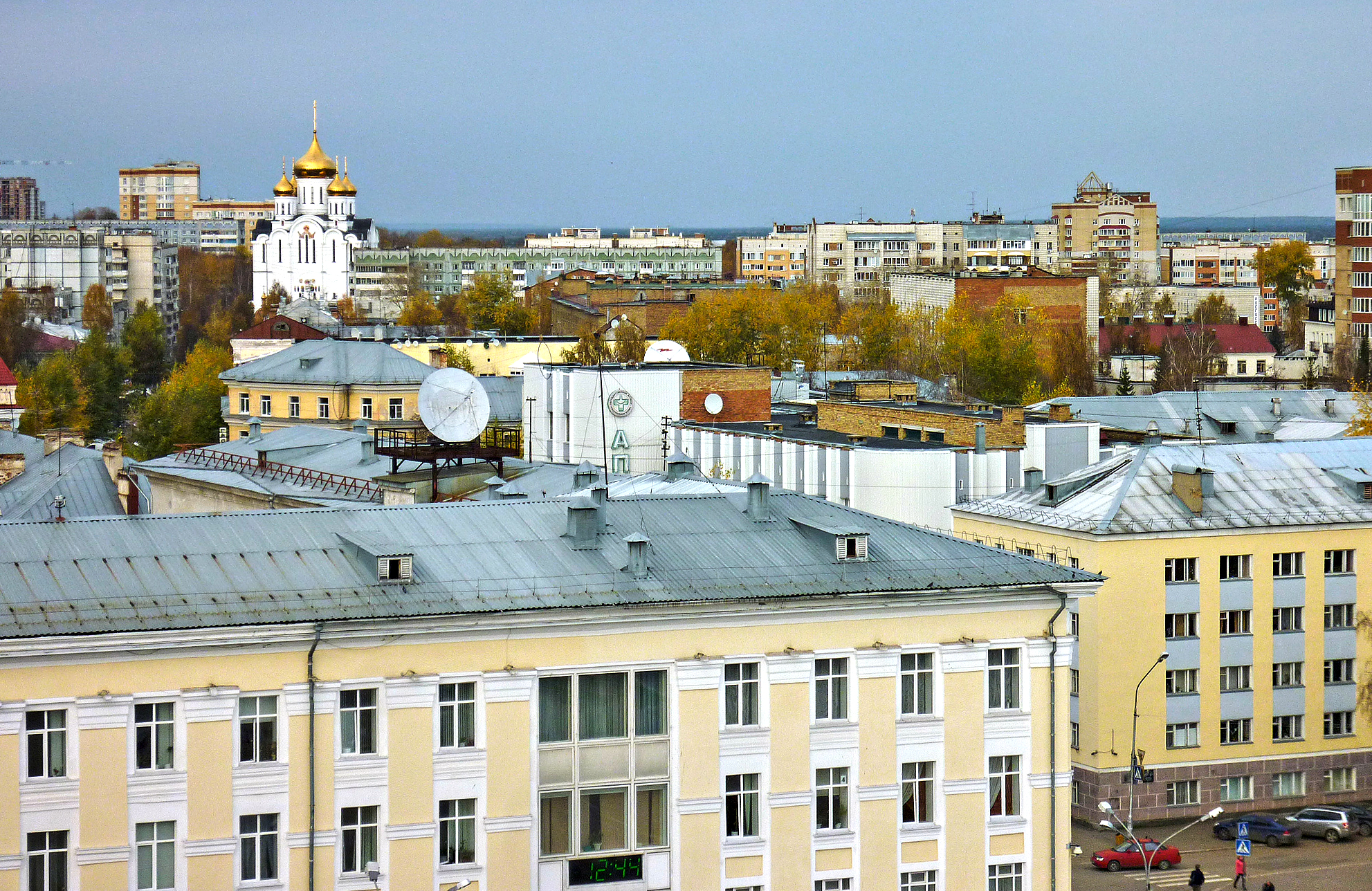
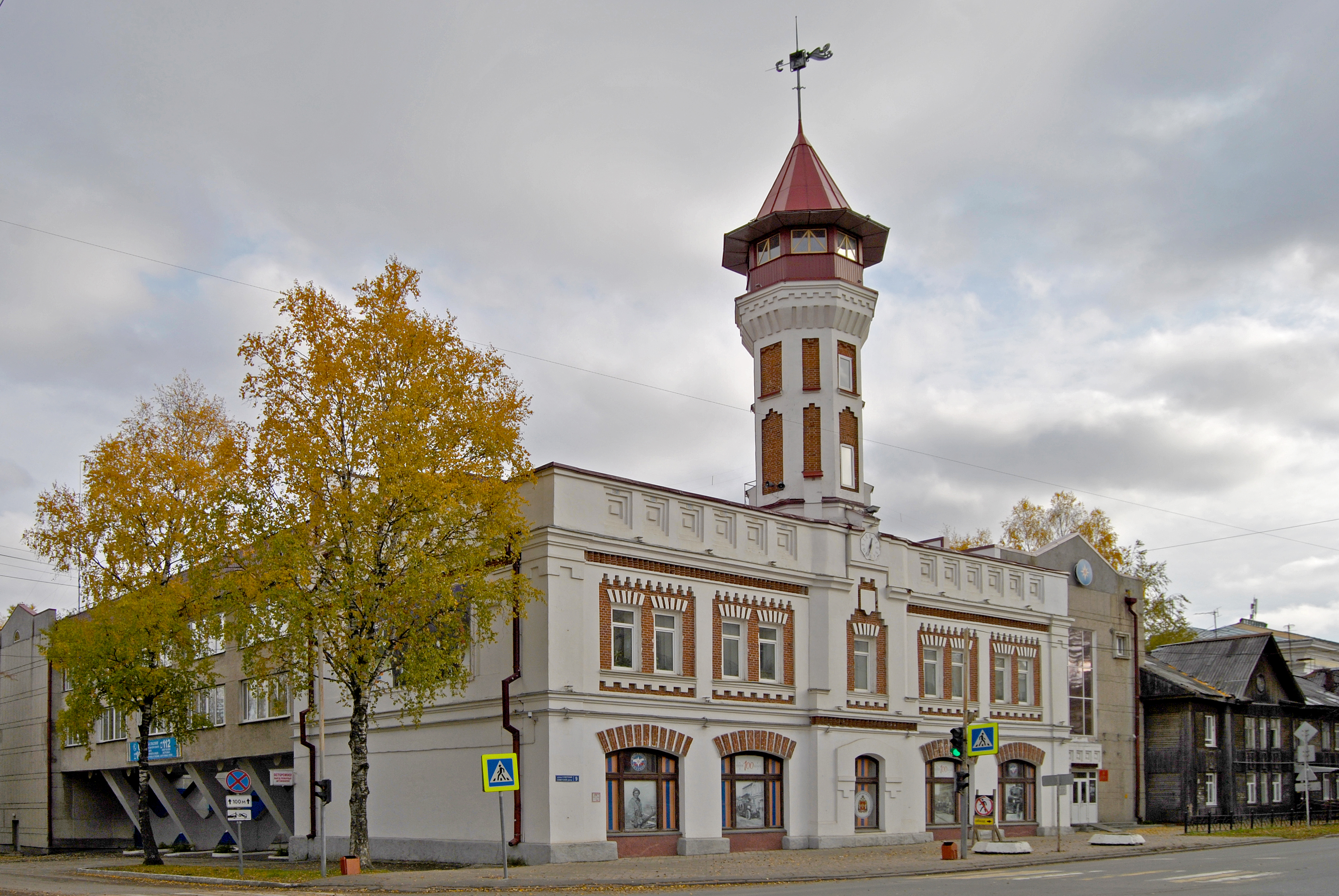
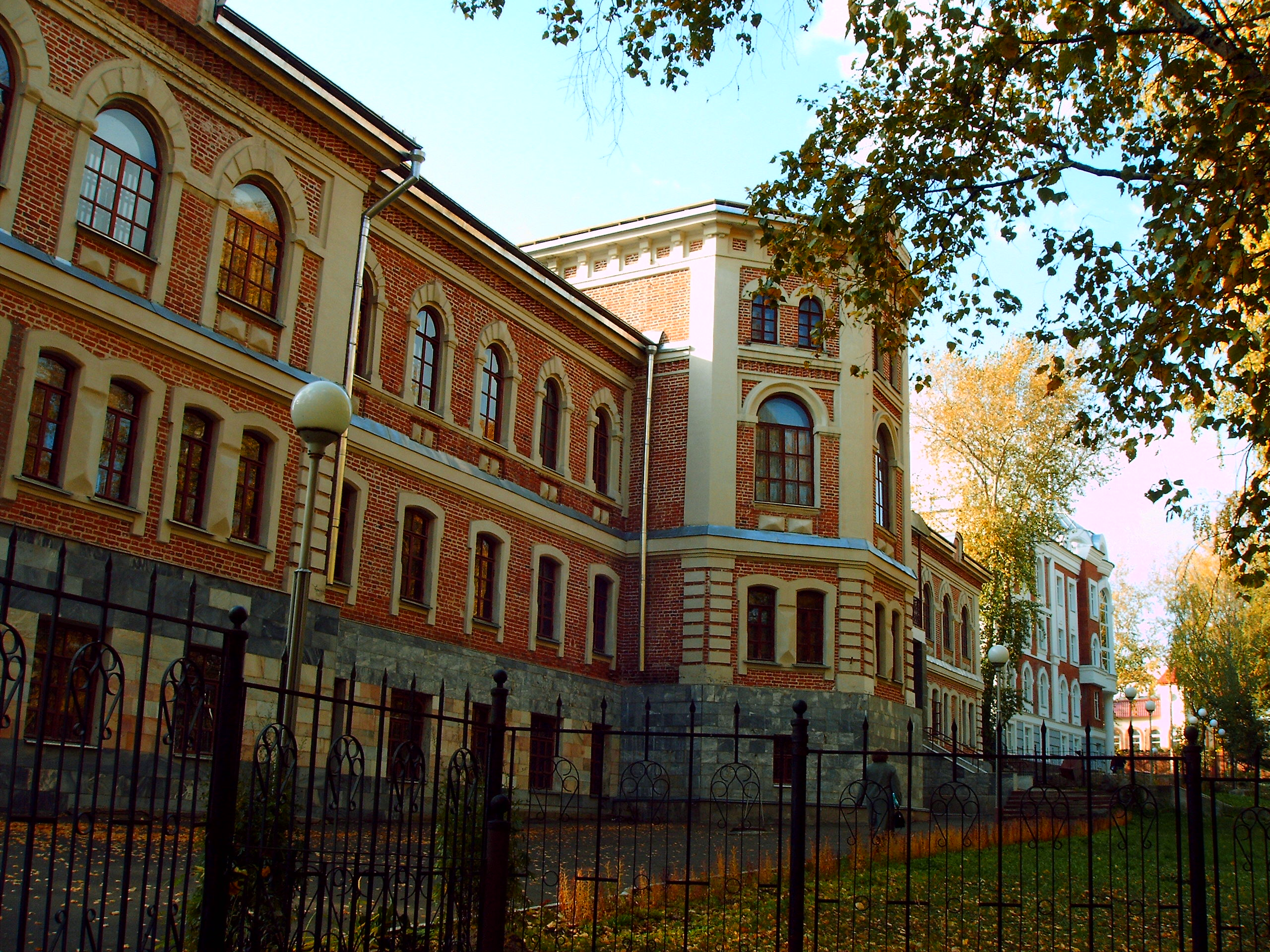
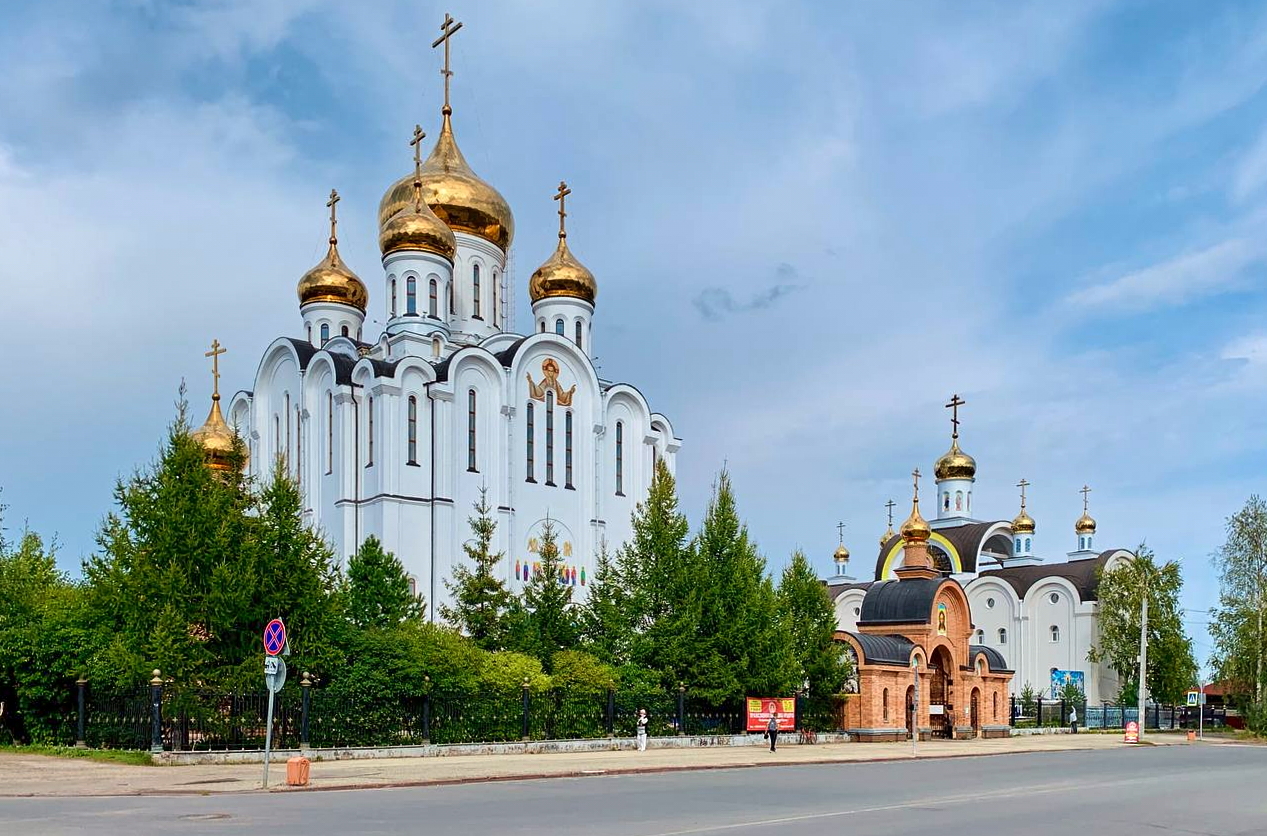
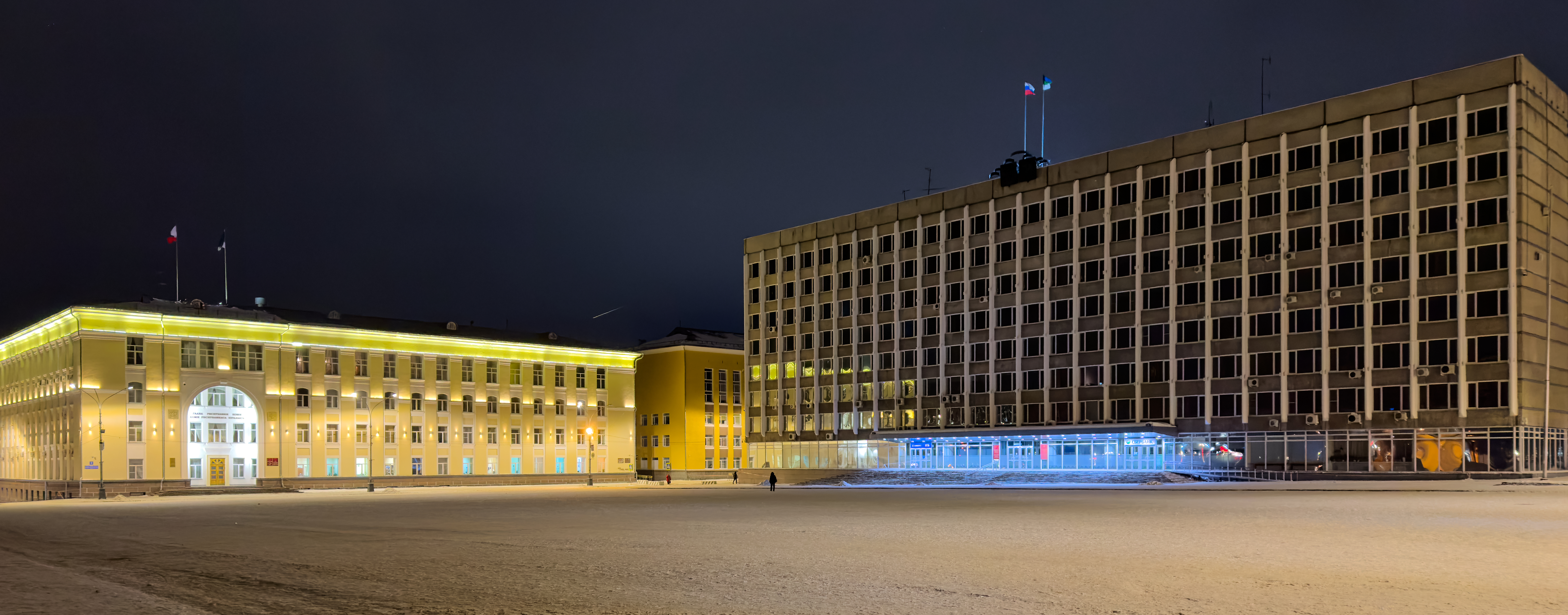
- View of Syktyvkar Fire station National Gallery St. Stephen cathedral Stefanovskaya Square

- Flag Coat of arms
- Interactive map of Syktyvkar
- Location of Syktyvkar Syktyvkar (European Russia) Syktyvkar (Europe) Syktyvkar (Russia)
- Coordinates: 61°40′N 50°49′E
- Country: Russia
- Federal subject: Komi Republic
- Founded: 1586
- City status since: 1780

Government
  - City district chairman: Vladimir Goldin

Area
  - Total: 152 km^{2} (59 sq mi)
- Elevation: 172 m (564 ft)

Population (2010 Census)
  - Total: 235,006
  - Estimate (2025): 219,094 (−6.8%)
  - Rank: 81st in 2010
  - Density: 1,550/km^{2} (4,000/sq mi)

Administrative status
  - Subordinated to: city of republic significance of Syktyvkar
  - Capital of: Komi Republic
  - Capital of: city of republic significance of Syktyvkar

Municipal status
  - Urban okrug: Syktyvkar Urban Okrug
  - Capital of: Syktyvkar Urban Okrug
- Time zone: UTC+3 (MSK)
- Postal codes: 167000, 167002, 167004, 167005, 167009, 167011, 167014, 167018, 167023, 167026, 167031
- Dialing code: +7 8212
- OKTMO ID: 87701000001
- Website: www.syktyvkar.komi.com

Syktyvkar (/sɪktɪfˈkɑːr/, Russian: Сыктывка́р, IPA: [sɨktɨfˈkar]; Komi: Сыктывкар, IPA: [sɨktɨvˈkar]) is the capital and largest city of the Komi Republic in Russia. It is also the administrative center of the Syktyvkar Urban Okrug. Until 1930, it was known as Ust-Sysolsk named after the Sysola River.

== Etymology ==
The city's name comes from Syktyv, the Komi name for the Sysola River, and kar, meaning "city" in the Komi language.

== Geography ==
Syktyvkar is located on the Sysola River, which is the origin of its former name Ust-Sysolsk. The city is located close to where the Sysola joins the larger Vychegda River, which is itself a branch of the Northern Dvina.

== History ==
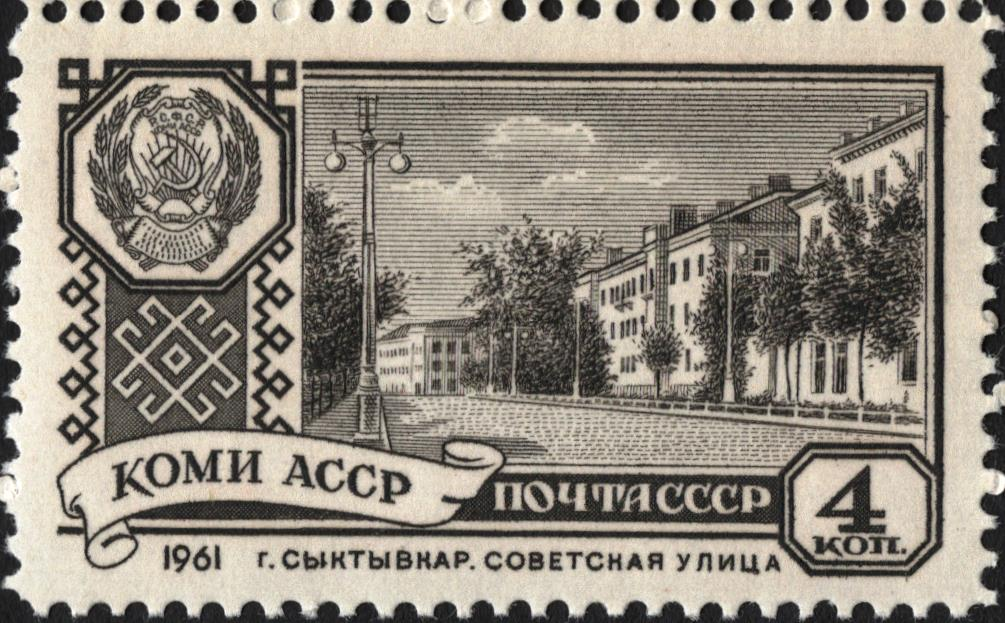
Syktyvkar street scene on a 1961 stamp

It is believed that the city was founded in 1586 as a settlement Ust-Sysola.

It was granted city status by Catherine the Great in 1780, and in 1992, it became the capital of the Komi Republic. It has remained the capital since then, although a large influx of ethnic Russians in the 20th century has actually left the Komi a minority there.

When Kandinsky stayed there in 1889 to record the culture and beliefs of the locals, the town had a group of administrative buildings along with more numerous log-built peasant huts.

The majority of the population were merchants and peasants. The main occupations of the inhabitants were agriculture, cattle-breeding, hunting, fishing, and trade.

By the beginning of the 20th century, the population had grown to 6,000 people. The Tsarist government made the Komi region a place of political exile.

In 1921, Ust-Sysolsk was given the status of administrative center of the newly formed Komi-Zyryan Autonomous Oblast. It was renamed as Syktyvkar, which is Komi for "a town on the Sysola" in 1930, to mark the 150th anniversary of its receipt of city privileges. In 1936, Syktyvkar became the capital of the Komi ASSR.

There is a monument near the Nizhny Chov suburb to those shot outside the city in the 1930s, but the remains of others executed earlier lie beneath the airfield.

During World War II, in connection with the formation of the Polish Anders' Army, a Polish diplomatic post was located in the city from September 1941 to July 1942.

== Administrative and municipal status ==
Syktyvkar is the capital of the republic. Within the framework of administrative divisions, it is, together with three urban-type settlements (Krasnozatonsky, Sedkyrkeshch, and Verkhnyaya Maksakovka) and three rural localities, incorporated as the city of republic significance of Syktyvkar—an administrative unit with the status equal to that of the districts. As a municipal division, the city of republic significance of Syktyvkar is incorporated as Syktyvkar Urban Okrug.

== Demographics ==
Historical population

Year	Pop.	±%
1897	4,464	—
1926	5,068	+13.5%
1939	25,281	+398.8%
1959	64,461	+155.0%
1970	125,088	+94.1%

Year	Pop.	±%
1979	170,980	+36.7%
1989	232,117	+35.8%
2002	230,011	−0.9%
2010	235,006	+2.2%
2021	220,580	−6.1%

Source: Census data

== Economy ==
The Sysola, the Vychegda, and the Northern Dvina are navigable and are a major transport route of forestry products from Syktyvkar. Lumber and woodcrafts are the city's largest industries.

Previously Komiinteravia had its head office in Syktyvkar.

=== Transportation ===
The city is served by Syktyvkar Airport and Syktyvkar Southwest airfield. The city has a railway station as well. Syktyvkar is the end point of route R176 (Vyatka Highway).

== Culture ==
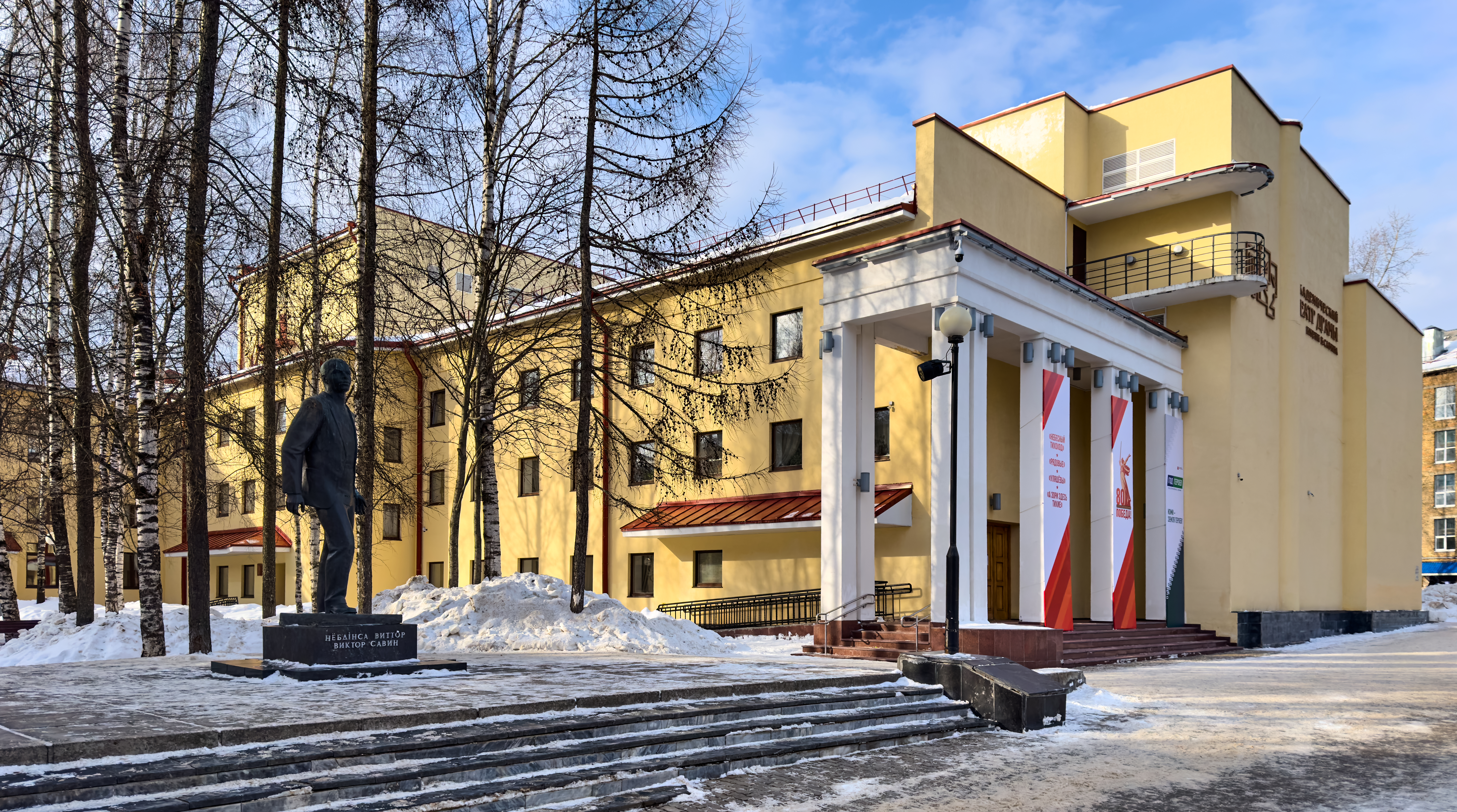
Drama Theater

Syktyvkar is the center of the cultural life in the republic.

The oldest museum of the Republic of Komi, the National Museum, was founded in 1911. Nowadays, the National Museum is the Literature Memorial Museum of Ivan Kuratov and the museum of Viktor Savin.

The National Gallery was founded in Syktyvkar in 1943. It welcomes exhibitions from different museums of the country. The Theater of Opera and Ballet began its history in 1958.

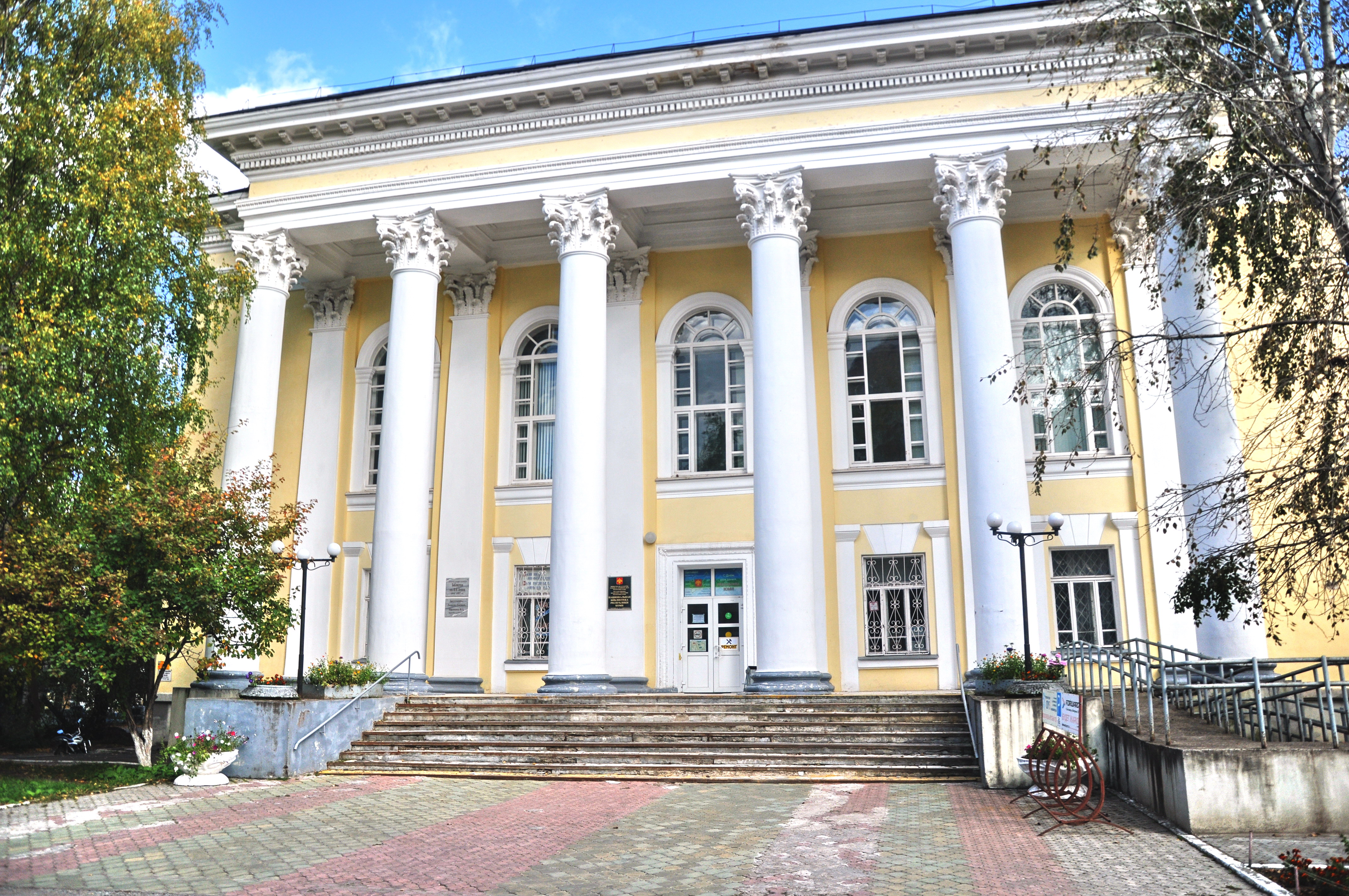
National Library of Komi

The National Library of Komi numbers 2.5 million volumes, including books in the Russian language, in the Komi language and in foreign languages.

The city's folk ensemble "Asya Kya" has been representing the Komi Republic on national and international festivals.

One of the oldest Russian progressive rock bands The Gourishankar was founded in Syktyvkar in 2001.

== Education ==
Syktyvkar State University was founded in 1972 and has over 3,500 full-time students and 250 faculty members.

== Climate ==
Syktyvkar experiences a subarctic climate (Köppen climate classification Dfc) with long, cold winters and short, warm summers. Compared with areas at a similar latitude in Siberia, winters are less extreme, but still much longer than summer and bitterly cold by European standards.

Climate data for Syktyvkar (1991–2020 normals, extremes 1888–present)
Month	Jan	Feb	Mar	Apr	May	Jun	Jul	Aug	Sep	Oct	Nov	Dec	Year
Record high °C (°F)	3.8 (38.8)	5.3 (41.5)	14.3 (57.7)	26.7 (80.1)	31.8 (89.2)	35.3 (95.5)	34.5 (94.1)	34.6 (94.3)	27.5 (81.5)	20.4 (68.7)	10.6 (51.1)	5.2 (41.4)	35.3 (95.5)
Mean daily maximum °C (°F)	−10.2 (13.6)	−8.1 (17.4)	−0.6 (30.9)	7.2 (45.0)	15.3 (59.5)	20.5 (68.9)	23.3 (73.9)	19.0 (66.2)	12.9 (55.2)	4.5 (40.1)	−3.6 (25.5)	−7.9 (17.8)	6.0 (42.8)
Daily mean °C (°F)	−13.4 (7.9)	−11.8 (10.8)	−5.1 (22.8)	2.1 (35.8)	9.1 (48.4)	14.6 (58.3)	17.6 (63.7)	14.0 (57.2)	8.6 (47.5)	1.9 (35.4)	−5.9 (21.4)	−10.7 (12.7)	1.8 (35.2)
Mean daily minimum °C (°F)	−16.8 (1.8)	−15.3 (4.5)	−9.3 (15.3)	−2.3 (27.9)	3.8 (38.8)	9.3 (48.7)	12.2 (54.0)	9.6 (49.3)	5.2 (41.4)	−0.3 (31.5)	−8.3 (17.1)	−13.7 (7.3)	−2.2 (28.0)
Record low °C (°F)	−46.6 (−51.9)	−45.4 (−49.7)	−38.8 (−37.8)	−27.3 (−17.1)	−15.0 (5.0)	−5.0 (23.0)	−0.3 (31.5)	−2.1 (28.2)	−8.6 (16.5)	−29.6 (−21.3)	−43.5 (−46.3)	−46.0 (−50.8)	−46.6 (−51.9)
Average precipitation mm (inches)	45 (1.8)	36 (1.4)	36 (1.4)	37 (1.5)	52 (2.0)	71 (2.8)	72 (2.8)	80 (3.1)	62 (2.4)	61 (2.4)	52 (2.0)	49 (1.9)	653 (25.7)
Average extreme snow depth cm (inches)	54 (21)	67 (26)	71 (28)	32 (13)	1 (0.4)	0 (0)	0 (0)	0 (0)	0 (0)	2 (0.8)	15 (5.9)	33 (13)	71 (28)
Average rainy days	4	3	5	13	19	19	19	21	23	19	8	6	159
Average snowy days	28	26	23	14	6	1	0	0.1	3	16	26	28	171
Average relative humidity (%)	83	81	75	67	64	68	73	79	84	86	86	84	78
Mean monthly sunshine hours	19.6	61.8	116.5	180.2	248.1	267.2	295.4	191.2	105.0	39.9	18.3	6.5	1,549.7
Source 1: Погода и Климат
Source 2: NOAA

== Sports ==
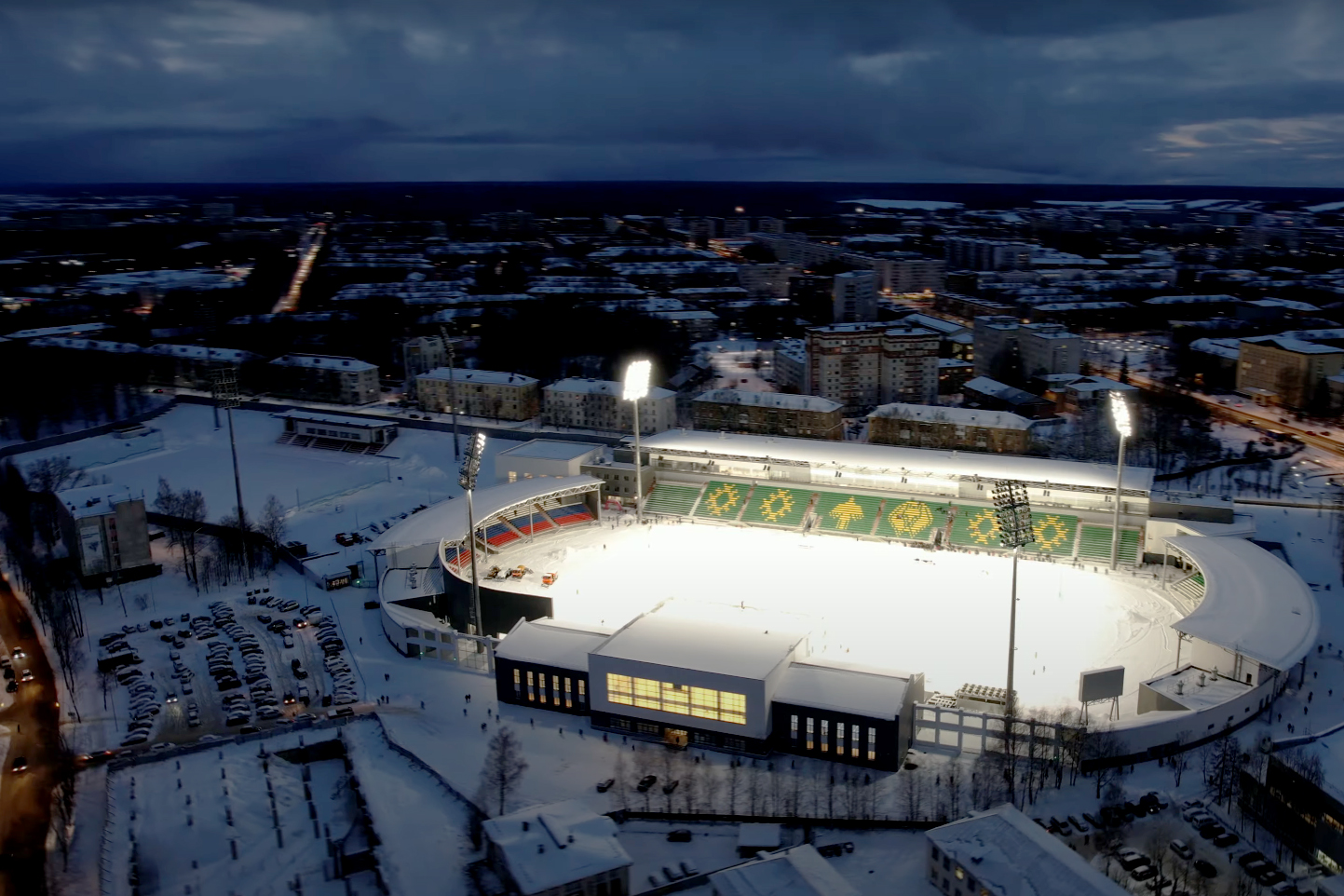
Respublikansky Stadion

Stroitel Bandy Club has played many seasons in the Russian Bandy Super League, the highest division of Russian bandy. The team was promoted after the 2016–17 season. Its home venue is Respublikanskiy Stadion. In the 2016/17 season, the club adopted a new logotype instead of an old one which had a white bear playing bandy.

There is also a youth team called KDYuSSh-1.

=== Events ===
- In January 2017 the Bandy Y-19 World Championship was organized in Syktyvkar.
- Syktyvkar was to host the 2021 Bandy World Championship, for which an indoor arena was to be erected. However, the tournament was repeatedly postponed due to the COVID-19 pandemic, and ultimately pulled from Syktyvkar altogether as a consequence of the 2022 Russian invasion of Ukraine.

== Notable people ==
- Victor Oganov (born 1976), Russian-Armenian boxer
- Feoktista Ivanovna Zaboeva (1850–1943), Russian teacher and folklorist

== Twin towns and sister cities ==
Syktyvkar is twinned with:

- Cullera, Spain
- Debrecen, Hungary
- Los Altos, United States
- Lovech, Bulgaria
- Taiyuan, China
