= Yelets (inhabited locality) =

Yelets (Russian: Елец) is the name of several inhabited localities in Russia.

== Urban localities ==
- Yelets, a city in Lipetsk Oblast; administratively incorporated as a city under oblast jurisdiction

== Rural localities ==
- Yelets, Belgorod Oblast, a khutor in Novooskolsky District of Belgorod Oblast
- Yelets, Komi Republic, a village under the administrative jurisdiction of Yeletsky Urban-Type Settlement Administrative Territory of the town of republic significance of Vorkuta, Komi Republic
