= Mulda =

Mulda may refer to:

- Mulda River, a river in Germany on which Machern stands
- Mulda, Germany, a municipality in Saxony, Germany
- Mulda, Russia, an urban locality (an urban-type settlement) under the administrative jurisdiction of the town of republic significance of Vorkuta in the Komi Republic, Russia
