= Vorkuta (disambiguation) =

Vorkuta is a town in the Komi Republic, Russia.

Vorkuta may also refer to:

- Vorkuta Urban Okrug, a municipal formation which the town of republic significance of Vorkuta in the Komi Republic, Russia is incorporated as
- Vorkuta Airport, an airport in the Komi Republic, Russia
- Vorkuta (river), a river in the Komi Republic, Russia
- Vorkuta Gulag, a Soviet-era prison camp
