= Promyshlenny (inhabited locality) =

Promyshlenny (Russian: Промы́шленный; masculine), Promyshlennaya (Промы́шленная; feminine), or Promyshlennoye (Промы́шленное; neuter) is the name of several inhabited localities in Russia.

Urban localities

- Promyshlenny, Komi Republic, an urban-type settlement under the administrative jurisdiction of Vorgashor Administrative Territory of Vorkuta, Komi Republic
- Promyshlennaya, an urban-type settlement in Promyshlennovsky District of Kemerovo Oblast

Rural localities

- Promyshlenny, Altai Krai, a settlement in Novikovsky Selsoviet of Biysky District of Altai Krai

Abolished localities

- Promyshlenny, Sakha Republic, a selo in Kobyaysky District of the Sakha Republic; abolished in 2008
