= Vdovichenko =

Vdovichenko or Vdovychenko (Ukrainian: Вдовиченко) is a Ukrainian surname. Notable people with the surname include:

- Nikolay Vdovichenko (born 1989), Ukrainian footballer
- Valentin Vdovichenko (1928–2003), Soviet Russian fencer
- Diego Vdovichenko (1985), argentinian poet.
- Iryna Vdovychenko
