= Nikolay Vdovichenko =

Russian footballer

Personal information
- Full name: Nikolay Vasiliyevich Vdovichenko
- Date of birth: 21 April 1989 (age 37)
- Place of birth: Oktyabrsky, Vorkuta, Komi ASSR, Russian SFSR
- Height: 1.90 m (6 ft 3 in)
- Position: Forward

Team information
- Current team: FC Dynamo Vologda (sports director)

Youth career
- 1997–2006: FC Fortuna Krasnoznamensk
- 2006: Master-Saturn

Senior career*
Years	Team	Apps	(Gls)
2007	FC Energiya Shatura (amateur)		
2008	Master-Saturn (amateur)		
2009	FC MVD Rossii-2 Moscow (amateur)		
2009–2010	FC Volga-d Nizhny Novgorod (amateur)		
2010	→ FC Khimik Dzerzhinsk (loan)	12	(0)
2011–2012	FC Tekstilshchik Ivanovo	41	(7)
2012	FC Gazovik Orenburg	5	(1)
2013	FC Gornyak Uchaly	10	(1)
2013–2015	FC KAMAZ Naberezhnye Chelny	38	(11)
2015–2016	FC Volga Nizhny Novgorod	0	(0)
2015–2016	→ FC Volga-Olimpiets Nizhny Novgorod (loan)	16	(4)
2016	FC Zenit Izhevsk	11	(1)
2017	FC KAMAZ Naberezhnye Chelny	5	(0)
2017–2018	FC Spartak Kostroma	20	(7)
2018–2020	FC Dynamo Bryansk	35	(8)
2020	FC Codru Lozova	10	(1)
2021	JK Narva Trans	5	(0)
2022	FC Dynamo Vologda	18	(0)
2024	Goats Moscow (amateur)		

Managerial career
- 2024–: FC Dynamo Vologda (sports director)
- * Club domestic league appearances and goals as of 20 July 2024

Nikolay Vasiliyevich Vdovichenko (Russian: Николай Васильевич Вдовиченко; born 21 April 1989) is a Russian former professional football player forward.

== Club career ==
In September 2020, he signed a contract with the Moldovan club FC Codru Lozova. He made his Moldovan Super Liga debut for FC Codru Lozova on 20 September 2020 in a game against FC Sfîntul Gheorghe.

In February 2021 he signed a contract with JK Narva Trans.

In April 2022, he signed a one-year contract with FC Dynamo Vologda.
