= Industrialny City District, Russia =

Industrialny City District is the name of several city divisions in Russia. The name literally means "industrial".

- Industrialny City District, Barnaul, a city district of Barnaul, the administrative center of Altai Krai
- Industrialny City District, Izhevsk, a city district of Izhevsk, the capital of the Udmurt Republic
- Industrialny City District, Khabarovsk, a city district of Khabarovsk, the administrative center of Khabarovsk Krai
- Industrialny City District, Perm, a city district of Perm, the administrative center of Perm Krai
Cities in Russia with a city division called "Industrialny"

== See also ==
- Industrialny (disambiguation)
- Promyshlenny City District
