= Matthew Lamb =

Matthew Lamb or Mathew Lamb may refer to:

- Sir Matthew Lamb, 1st Baronet (1705–1768), British barrister and politician
- Matt Lamb (1932–2012), American painter
- Mathew Charles Lamb (1948–1976), Canadian spree killer and psychiatric patient, latterly a soldier in the Rhodesian Army
- Matt Lamb (cricketer) (born 1996), English cricketer
- Matthew Lamb (actor) (born 2012), American actor
