= Industrialny =

Industrialny (masculine), Industrialnaya (feminine), or Industrialnoye (neuter) may refer to:

- Industrialny (rural locality) (Industrialnaya, Industrialnoye), several rural localities in Russia
- Industrialny City District, Russia, several city districts in Russia
- Industrialnyi District, Dnipro, Ukraine
- Industrialnyi District, Kharkiv, Ukraine

== See also ==
- Industrial (disambiguation)
- Industry (disambiguation)
- Promyshlenny (disambiguation)
