= Lutheran Church of Saint Peter and Saint Paul =

Church in St. Petersburg, Russia

- Russian: Церковь Святых Петра и Павла German: Kirche der Heiligen Peter und Paul
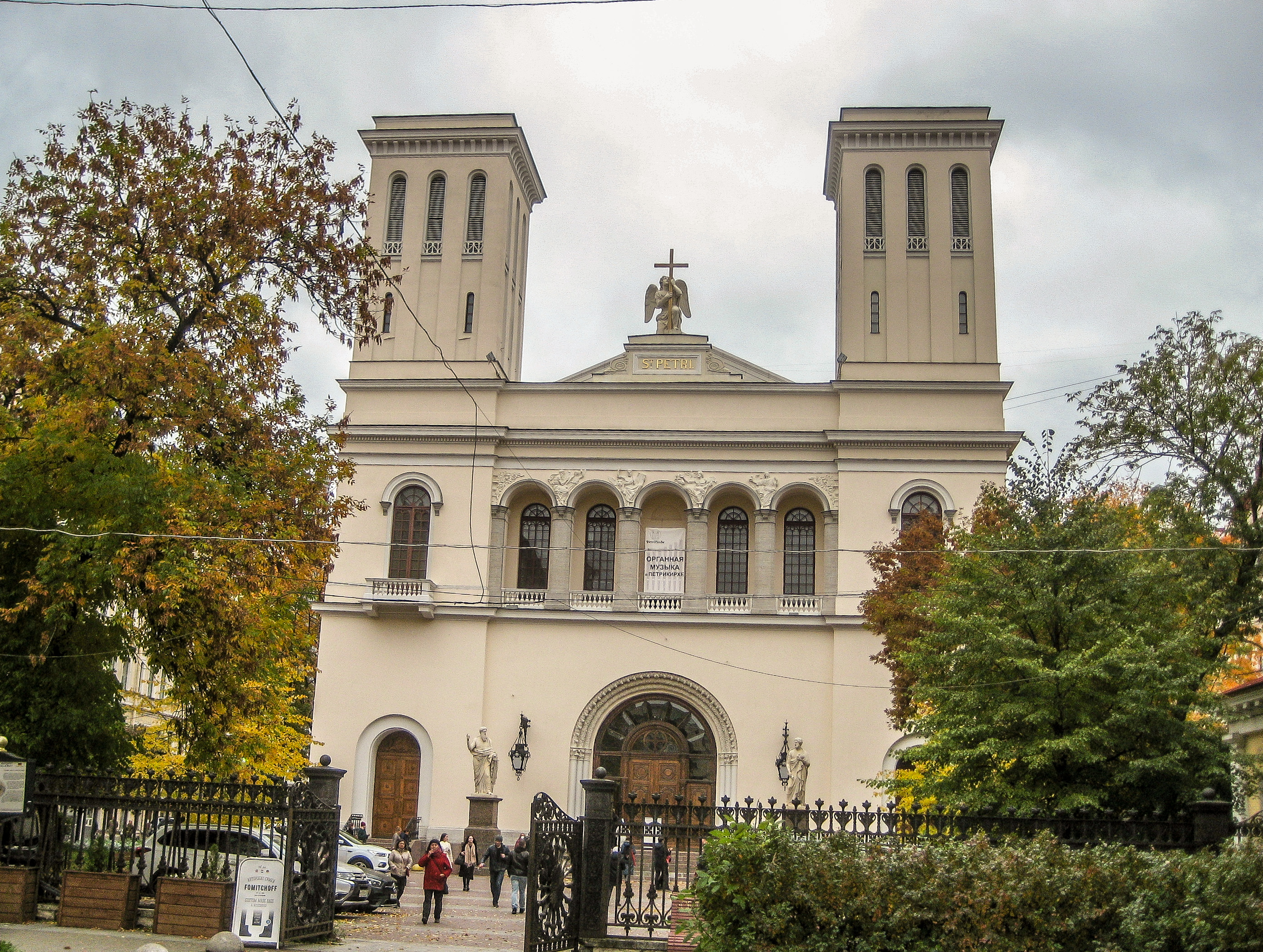

Religion
- Affiliation: Lutheran
- Governing body: Evangelical Lutheran Church of the European part of Russia

Location
- Location: Nevsky Prospekt, 22-24B
- State: Russia
- Interactive map of Lutheran Church of Saint Peter and Saint Paul
- Coordinates: 59.9367°N 30.3239°E

Architecture
- Architect: Alexander Brullov
- Style: Classicism, Neo-Romanesque
- Founder: Peter II of Russia
- Established: 1833
- Completed: 1838

Website
- https://petrikirche.ru/

The Lutheran Church of Saint Peter and Saint Paul (Russian: Лютеранская церковь Святых Петра и Павла or in German: Lutherische Kirche der Heiligen Peter und Paul, also known as Petrikirche) is a Lutheran church in the center of St. Petersburg on Nevsky Prospekt. Services are held in German and Russian. The rector of the parish is also the head of the North-West Probate of the Evangelical Lutheran Church of the European Part of Russia. Also in the church building is the office of the Archbishop of the Union of Evangelical Lutheran Church in Russia, Ukraine, Kazakhstan and Central Asia.

It is one of the oldest and largest Protestant churches in Russia. It is called the German church as its members were mostly German-speaking.

== History of the building ==
Beginning of existence By decree of 26 December 1727, Emperor Peter II allocated land to the German Lutheran community in a deserted area near a large promising road between the current Bolshaya and Malaya Konyushennaya streets. The site was donated 'for the construction of an evangelical church, a school and a parsonage'. The church building was founded on 29 June 1728, the day of the Holy Apostles Peter and Paul. On 25 June 1730, on the day of the celebration of the 200th anniversary of the Augsburg Confession, the church was solemnly consecrated in the name of the apostles Peter and Paul (later the name St. Peter was more often used in documents and everyday life). Stylistically, the new church building belonged to the examples of Petrine Baroque architecture characteristic of St. Petersburg in the first third of the 18th century. The building was made of brick, had a wooden turret and could accommodate 1,500 people (about a thousand below and five hundred in the choir).

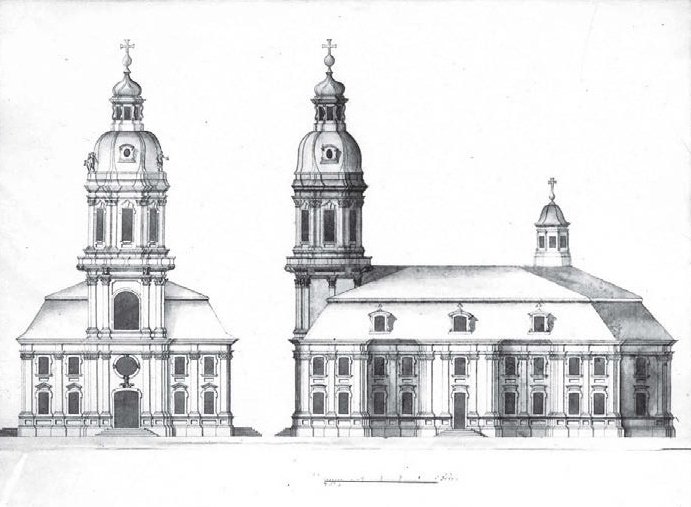
The first Lutheran Church of St. Peter on Nevsky Prospekt

The Baroque altar was decorated with a gilded sculpture and four paintings: 'The Last Supper', 'The Transfiguration of the Lord', 'The Resurrection of Christ' and 'Jesus with Thomas the Unbeliever' ("The Appearance of Christ to Thomas and Other Disciples'). The latter work has traditionally been attributed to the 16th-century German artist Hans Holbein the Younger. The church interior also contained paintings depicting the apostles, made by the St. Petersburg Swiss painter Georg Gsell. On 27 December 1737, the solemn consecration of the organ, made by the master I. G. Joachim from Mitava, took place. The temple received its final internal and external decoration in 1738, ten years after its foundation.

In 1735, two wooden houses were built in front of the church building, where the apartments of church ministers and the school were located. In 1740, by order of the 'Commission on St. Petersburg Buildings', all wooden buildings facing Nevsky Prospekt, the main street of the city, were demolished, including two houses that belonged to the Church of St. Peter. In their place, between 1747 and 1752, new stone buildings were built according to the design of the architect I. G. Kempf.

In 1762, on a plot belonging to the Lutheran community, behind the church, a two-story building of the Lutheran school Petrishule was built, which subsequently went through many reconstructions, but has survived to this day.

=== Architect A. P. Bryullov and the new church building ===
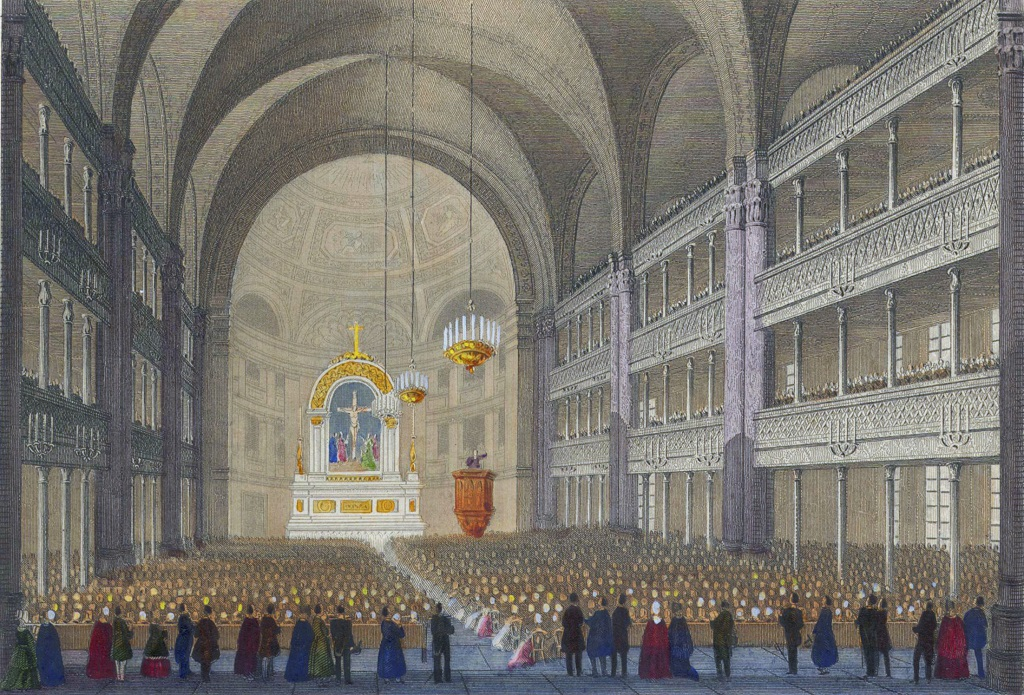
Interior view of St. Peter's Lutheran Church, 1840s

At the beginning of 1832, when the church building fell into disrepair, the community announced a competition to create a design for a new church. The best of the seven works presented was the project of Alexander Bryullov, brother of the artist Karl Bryullov. In his project, the architect used motifs of Romanesque architecture in combination with techniques of Russian classicism.

In 1830–1832, the architect E. T. Zollikofer rebuilt both corner houses that belonged to the community. In place of the old buildings, three-story stone houses in the style of classicism appeared (later built on).

The old church building was demolished in the summer of 1833, and on 21 August the foundation stone for a new one took place. The construction of the temple was basically completed in three years. Finishing work was carried out in 1836–1838.

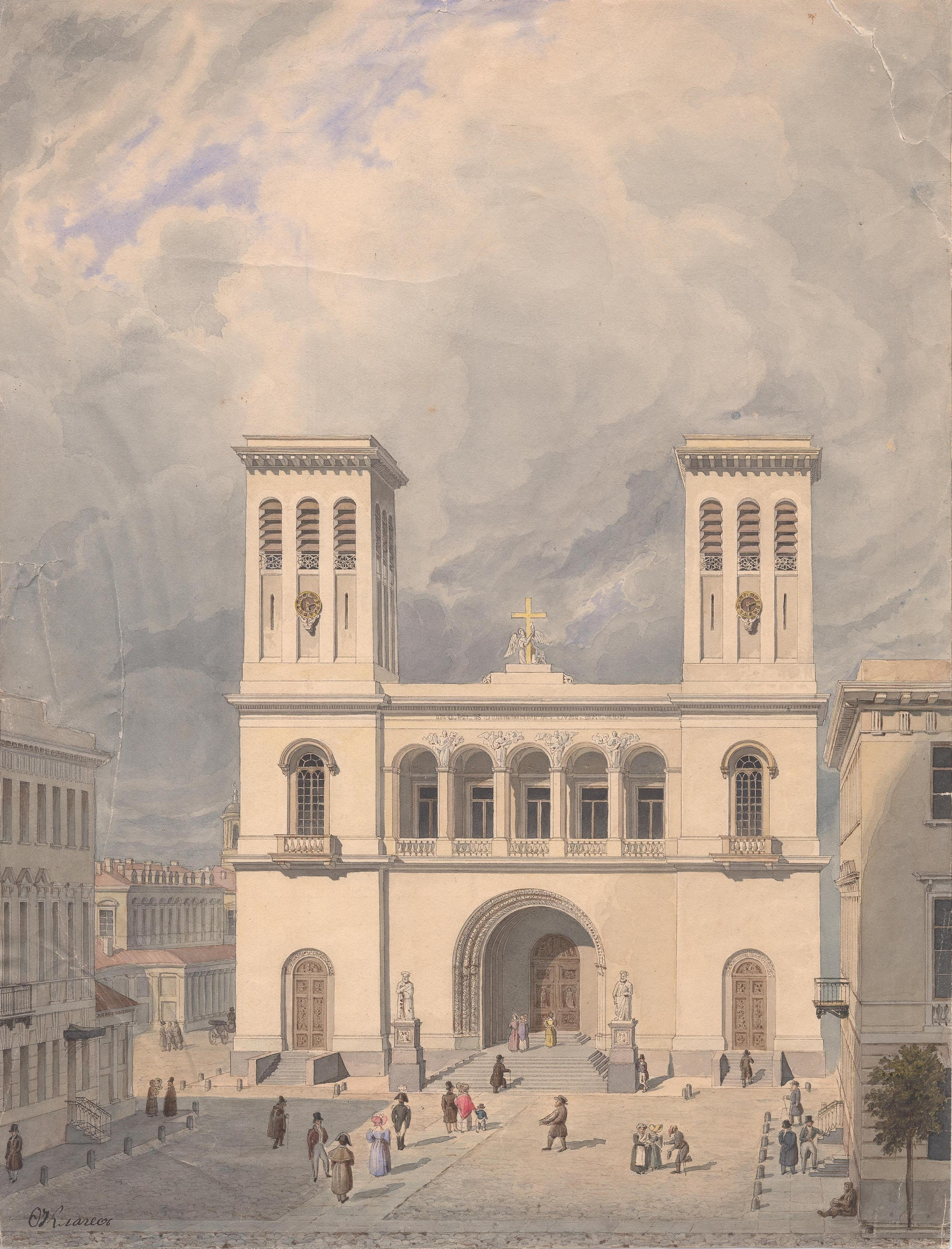
Facade of St. Peter's Lutheran Church. Drawing by F. A. Klages (1830–1840s)

The elder of the church, watchmaker Johann August Ditmar, made a solar clock for the western (left) tower and a mechanical striking clock for the eastern (right). The copper dials of both watches were made by bronze craftsman Tegelstein. The boards themselves were painted black, and the numbers, hands and bronze decorations were gilded. The striking clock mechanism was mounted in a special glazed ash display case and was preserved until the mid-20th century.

In front of the church, marble figures of the apostles Peter and Paul were installed - copies of sculptures by the famous Danish and Icelandic sculptor Bertel Thorvaldsen, created by the Italian master Triscorni. Four high reliefs with images of the evangelists, made from cement mass by the sculptor T. N. Jacques, were placed on the arcades of the loggia. The sculptural decoration of the front facade was completed by the figure of a kneeling angel with a cross, placed above the attic between the towers. The sculpture was carved from sandstone by sculptor I. German.

The altar of the church was decorated with a large painting by Karl Bryullov depicting the crucifixion. At the bottom of the altar there was a painting by Hans Holbein the Younger "Jesus with Doubting Thomas" (the only painting taken from the altar of the previous church), and on both sides there were round images of Saints Peter and Paul, also the creations of Bryullov. The painter I. Drollinger painted the walls. The sculptor P. Cretan was responsible for the carvings, creating the wooden frame of the altar painting and the preaching pulpit. The pulpit was carved from oak and shaped like an octagonal open box supported by the figures of the four evangelists.

On the day of the Reformation, 31 October 1838, the new church was consecrated.

In 1840, a large organ from the Walcker company (Ludwigsburg, Kingdom of Württemberg) was installed in the temple. In 1851, oak doors were installed in the central portal, and the open porch became a vestibule. The carved doors were made according to the drawings of the architect Y.K. Hofer (or G.A. Bosse).

In 1863, bells made in Bochum (Westphalia) appeared in the western tower of the church.

In 1864, 2 stained glass windows based on the famous works of Albrecht Dürer "St. Peter and St. John" and "St. Mark and St. Paul". Originally, stained glass windows were located on either side of the organ. Later, in 1866, at the request of the donors, they were moved downstairs, decorating the two windows closest to the main entrance. Stained glass windows "Moses in the Desert with the Serpent" and "Jesus on the Mount of Olives" appeared in the vacant places near the organ. In the same 1866, the church received another stained glass window as a gift, this time on the subject of "Jesus Preaching to the Disciples." This stained glass window occupied the middle part of the side arched window opening on the side of the pulpit. Finally, in 1871, a stained glass window with the image of the Holy Family and a shepherd kneeling before Christ appeared opposite.

=== Reconstructions of the 1880–1890s ===
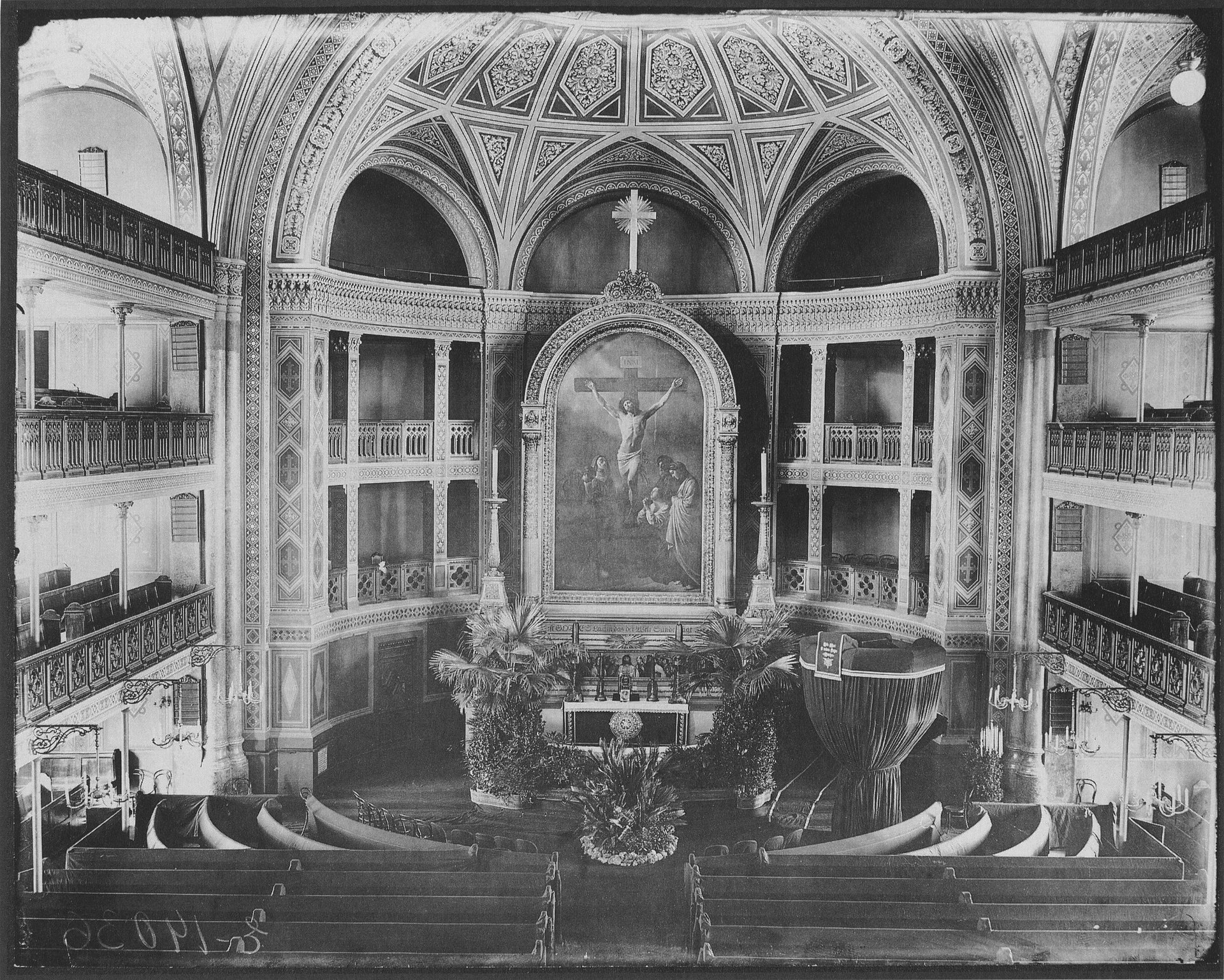
Interior after completion of the 1895–1897 reconstruction. Photo from the beginning of the 20th century.

Meanwhile, the church building fell into disrepair, as the soil was too soft and the difference in pressure on it led to settlement of the walls and the appearance of cracks in them. In 1881, the church council turned to Professor Rudolf Bernhard, a well-known expert in church building technology, for help. He was one of the first to develop a method for mathematically calculating the stability of church buildings. In the summer of 1883, Bernhard partially corrected the situation with the help of steel ties (which are still clearly visible in the building's interior), and over time the condition of the structure stabilized. During this same period, the wooden roof rafters were replaced with metal trusses.

In 1895–1897, the interior of the church was radically changed according to the design of Professor Maximilian Messmacher, the largest architect of the late 19th century, a leading representative of late historicism architecture. Messmacher saw the goal of the reconstruction in bringing the interior elements to a certain stylistic unity ('... the interior of the church should have been decorated more uniformly, while Renaissance and Greek motifs should have received free and equal expression'). According to Messmacher's design, a new painting of the walls and vaults was created: all the architectural elements of the interior were divided into separate geometrically regular sections - panels and were maximally saturated with decor. In addition, two side entrances were installed on the sides of the main entrance to the church hall, electric lighting was installed, instead of cast iron fences, carved oak fences appeared on all tiers of galleries, and the organ choir was expanded.

In 1910–1911, both buildings, which belonged to the church and faced Nevsky Prospekt, were built on two floors. The superstructure was designed by architect W. E. Collins. He kept the three-story buildings in their original form, and in the built-on floors he repeated the same pattern of windows, sandstones and balconies, friezes, cornices and attics.

=== Soviet period ===
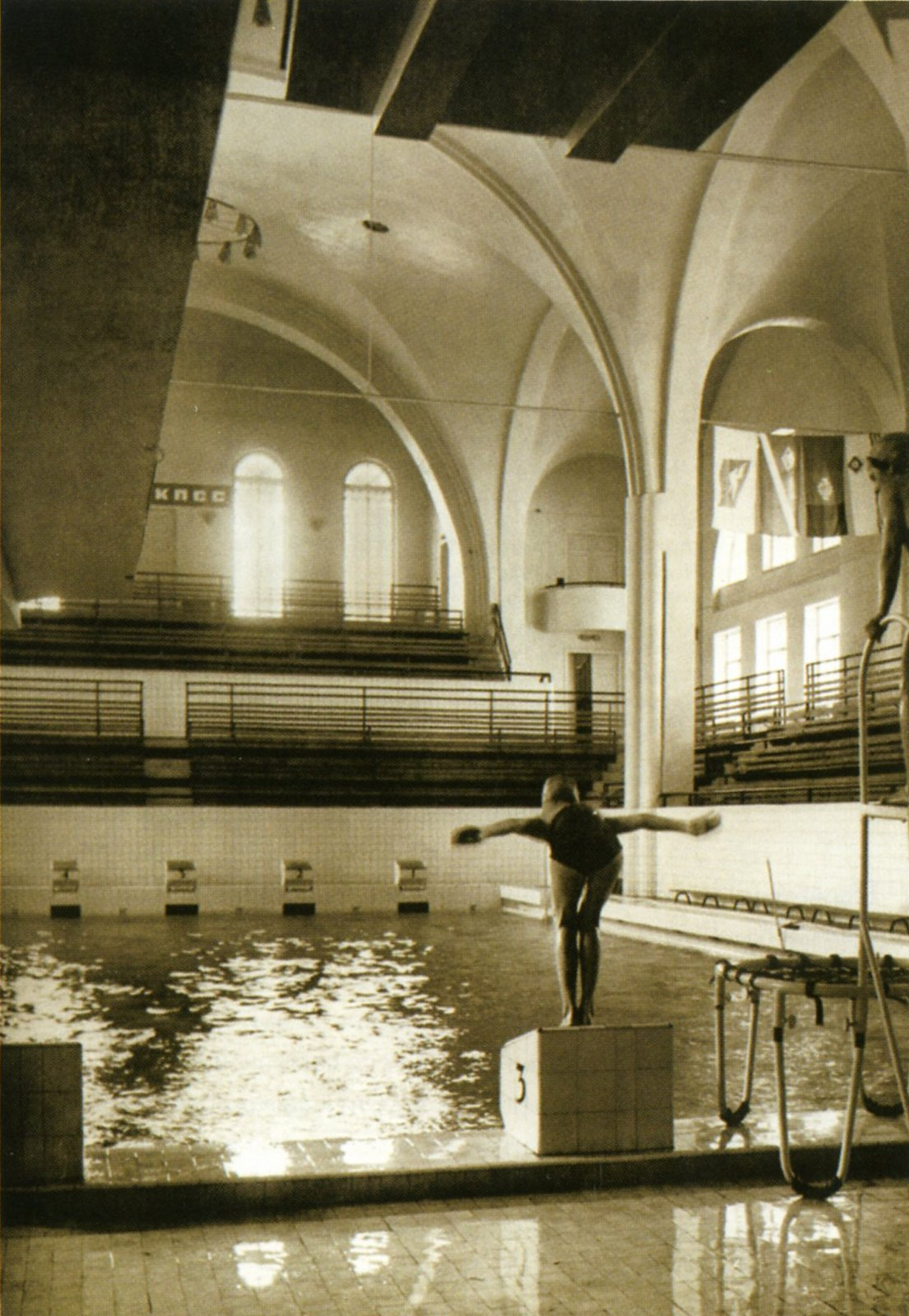
Swimming pool in the Petrikirche building. In the background is the slogan "Glory to the Communist Party of the Soviet Union!"

After the October Revolution, many church parishioners emigrated from the city. Despite the reduction in the size of the community and oppression by the authorities, Petrikirche worked longer than other Lutheran churches in the city, but at the end of 1937 it too was closed.

In 1937, pastors Paul and Bruno Reichert were arrested and executed in 1938.

In 1938, after the closure of the Petrikirche as a "building of worship", the former church was used to display the North Pole panorama. Since 1939, the warehouse of the Lengosestrady Theater was located here, and military units were stationed here in 1941–1945. The building increasingly lost its artistic decoration and fell into disrepair.

Some furnishings of artistic value were confiscated and transferred to museums. The altar painting “The Crucifixion” by Karl Bryullov is still in the Russian Museum (in 2007, a smaller copy of the painting appeared in the church hall). The stained glass windows ended up in the storerooms of the State Hermitage Museum (currently being restored). Some valuable property has disappeared forever. The Walker organ was lost.

After the end of the World War II, the heavily damaged building housed various warehouses, from theatrical scenery to vegetables. In 1958, reconstruction of the building into a swimming pool for the Baltic Shipping Company began. The author of the project was the architect Izoitko Askold. During this restructuring, the layout was changed and the interior was completely redone. A reinforced concrete bath 25 meters long was built in the central nave, jumping towers were located in the altar, and stands with 800 seats were located on three sides of the hall. The grand opening of the pool took place in 1963.

=== Restoring the building's function and restoration 1994–1997 ===
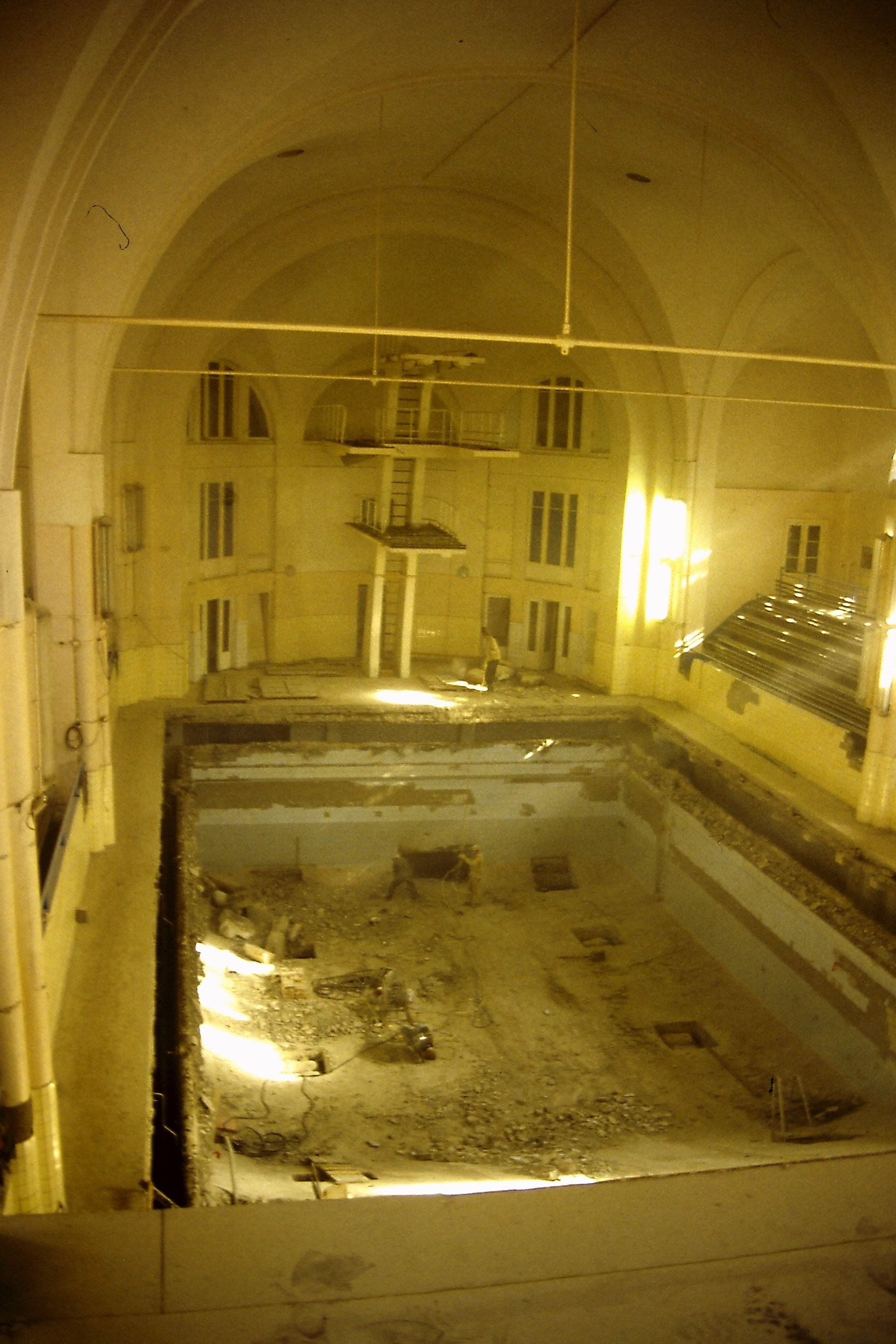
Dismantling the pool, 1994

In 1993, the church building was returned to the Lutheran community. The outside of the building is generally well preserved. The situation with the interior of the church was much more serious. Firstly, the entire lower part of the church hall was occupied by a concrete basin. Secondly, the difference in ground pressure led to uneven settlement of the building walls and the formation of cracks, aggravated by the construction of the pool. Thirdly, during the reconstruction of the 1990s, the historical system of brick vaulted ceilings was damaged, which led to the appearance of cracks with an opening of up to 10 mm.

The architectural concept was developed by Sabine and Fritz Wenzel on behalf of the European Bank for Reconstruction and Development in Frankfurt in agreement with the Federal Ministry of the Interior and Community of Germany. Sharapan. However, during the reconstruction carried out in the 1990s, the unique brick vault systems were damaged. Large diameter holes are punched in the body of the so-called reverse vaults for the passage of metal columns of the new floor. This circumstance greatly complicates the task of bringing the architectural appearance of the church to the historical one.

The new floor is 4 meters higher than the previous one, with the pool bowl still underneath it. It is not possible to remove it without conducting comprehensive surveys and developing a design for strengthening structures. The decrease in the height of the hall is very noticeable, because of this the acoustics are damaged.

On September 30, 1999, in the church courtyard to the right of the main facade, a bronze bust of Johann Wolfgang von Goethe by the St. Petersburg sculptor Levon Lazarev was unveiled. The opening was timed to coincide with the 250th anniversary of the birth of the German poet and thinker. The sculptural portrait is based on Goethe's death mask from the museum in Weimar.

=== Modern history of the building. Restoration 2016–2019 ===
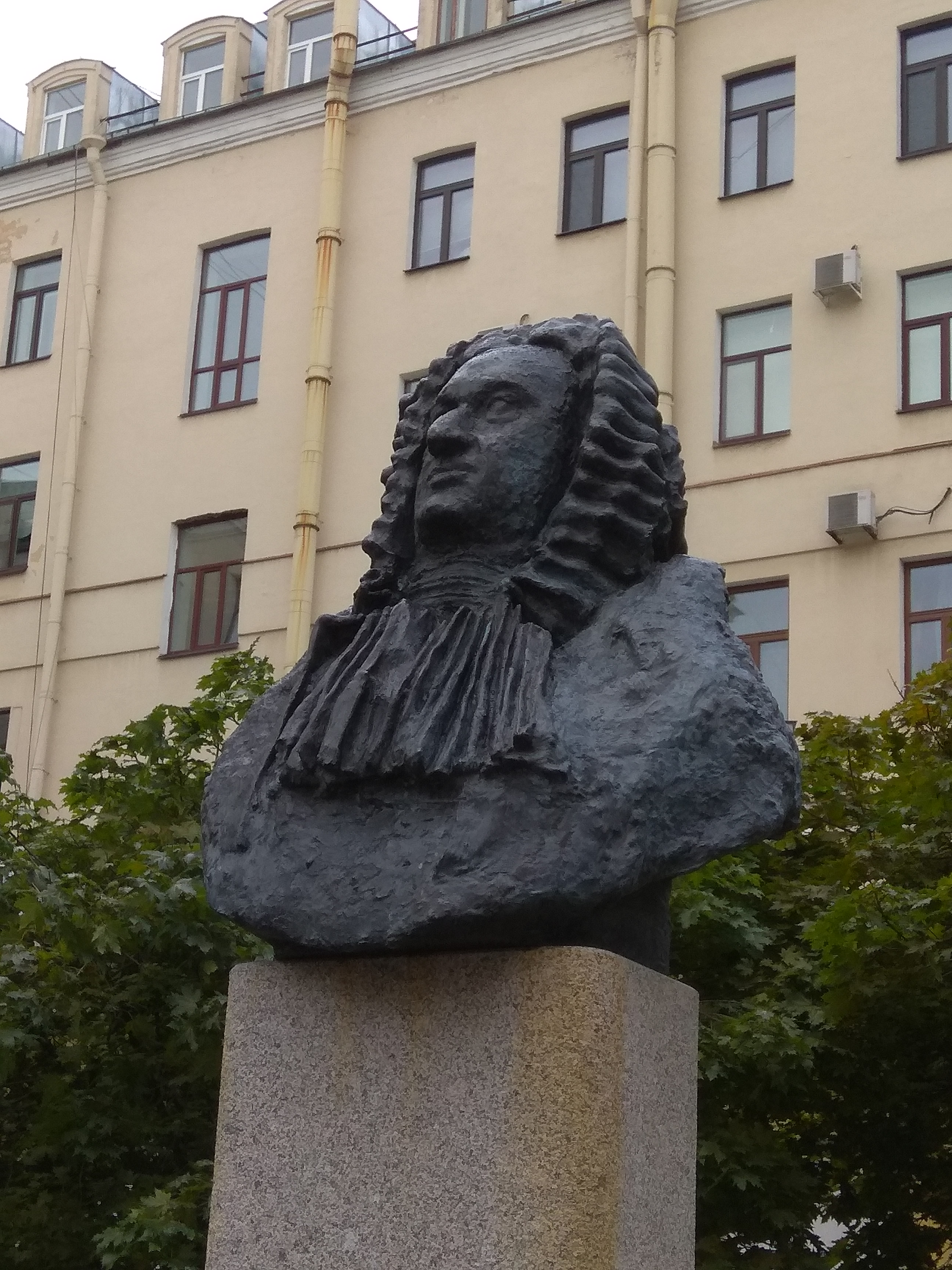
Bust of Johann Sebastian Bach in front of the Petrikirche building

In 2016, restoration work began, the goal of which is to completely return the southern façade of the church to its historical appearance.

The first stage was the restoration of the sculpture of an angel with a cross, crowning the façade of the temple. The work, which began in June 2016, included the restoration of the sculpture itself and the attic, and the reconstruction of the cross and volutes. The restoration was carried out at the expense of the budget of St. Petersburg within the framework of the program of the Committee for State Control, Use and Protection of Historical and Cultural Monuments (KGIOP) and was timed to coincide with the 500th anniversary of the Reformation. On October 31, 2016, the grand opening of the sculpture after restoration took place. The cross, lost in the 1950s, has been recreated according to historical documents: it is made of oak and trimmed with gold-colored copper plates. Experts installed 600-kilogram volutes made of natural stone on the attic, which had been missing for many decades "as unnecessary parts." In addition, restoration of the bronze letters of the inscription "St. Petri" with replacement of lost gilding.

The next stage in restoring the historical appearance of the cathedral was the restoration of the building’s facades, carried out in 2018–2019. This restoration was also carried out at the expense of the budget of St. Petersburg. For nine months (April-December 2018), specialists carried out restoration of the basement of the building, plaster finishing of the facades, stucco decoration of openings and bas-reliefs in the tympanums of the gallery, elements made of cast iron, metal lanterns, filling of window and door openings. The historical fences of the porches were recreated, and the doors of the central portal were restored. The carved cross returned to the glazed transom of the doors. In the summer of 2019, the statues of the apostles Peter and Paul in front of the central entrance to the building were put on display. Ceremonial events to mark the completion of restoration work took place on 17 December 2019.

On 14 September 2019, a bronze bust of Johann Sebastian Bach was unveiled in front of the Petrikirche building. The monument took place opposite the bust of Johann Wolfgang von Goethe. The author of both monuments is Levon Lazarev. The sculptor finished work on the composer’s statue in 2004, shortly before his death. The installation of the bust was organized by the St. Petersburg International Festival Earlymusic with the support of the Delzell Foundation and the Consulate General of Germany in St. Petersburg.

On 29 October 2021, the sun and mechanical clocks, lost during Soviet times, were returned to the Petrikirche towers. The clock was recreated based on archival materials. The clock was solemnly consecrated on 31 October 2021 during a service for the Reformation Day. The installation of the clock was the final stage of recreating the historical appearance of the southern façade of the Petrikirche.

== History of the church community ==
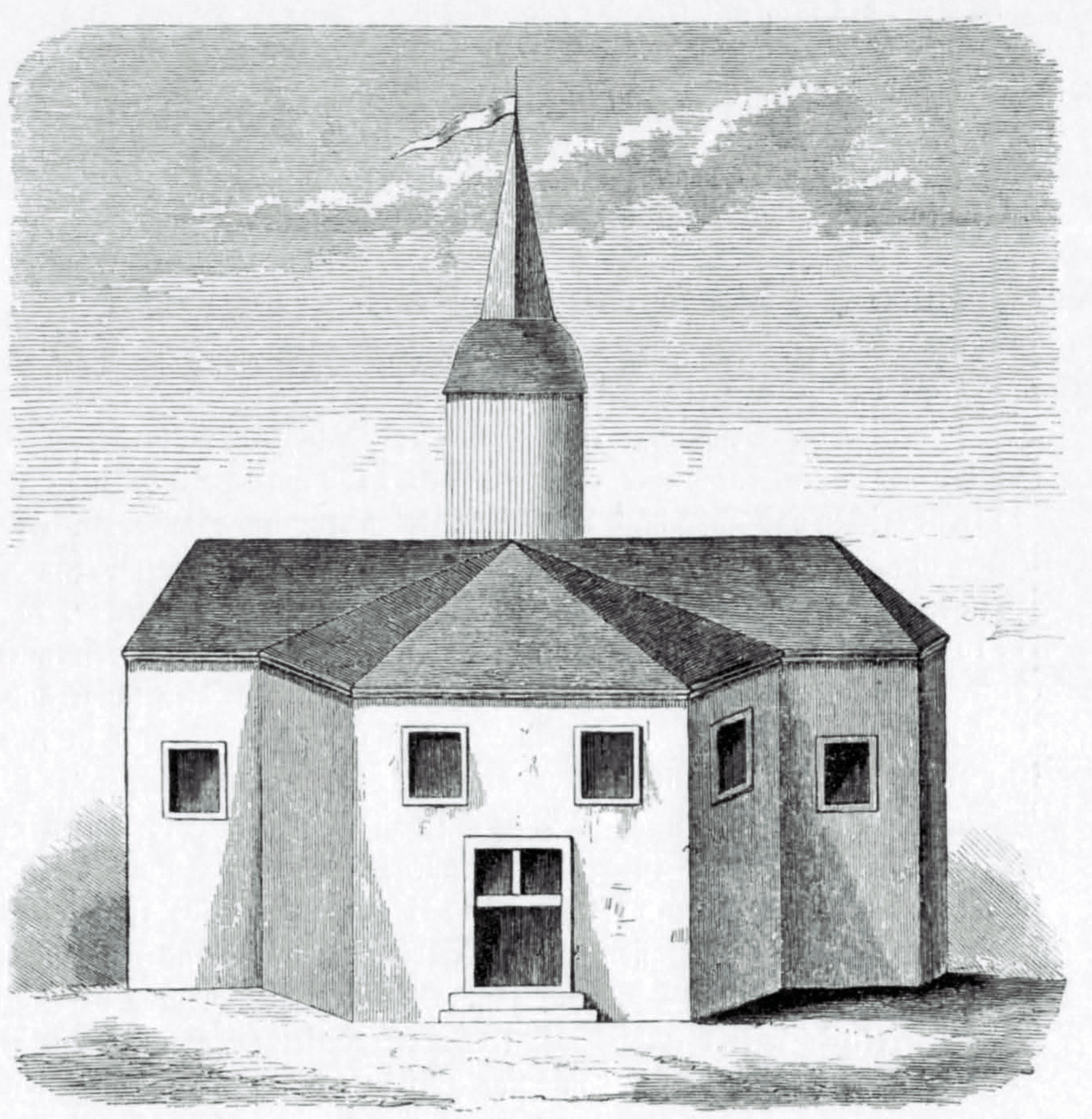
Original wooden church building

The German Lutheran community is older than the church building. Lutheran Germans inhabited St. Petersburg from its founding. Initially, they gathered for their prayer meetings in the house of Vice-Admiral Cornelius Cruys - approximately on the site where the New Hermitage is now located. The services were then conducted by Pastor Wilhelm Tolle. In 1709, a small wooden church was erected in the courtyard of Kruys’s house, in which both Lutheran Germans and Dutch Reformed people from all over the Admiralty Island, where the German Settlement was located, gathered. The founding date of the community is considered to be 1710. Over time, the need arose to build a separate large church building, which began in 1727 with the allocation of a site for its construction. The first pastor of Petrikirche was Heinrich Nazius (1687-1751). On 25 June 1730, Pastor Heinrich performed a solemn service in the building of a wooden church in honor of the anniversary of the Augsburg Confession.

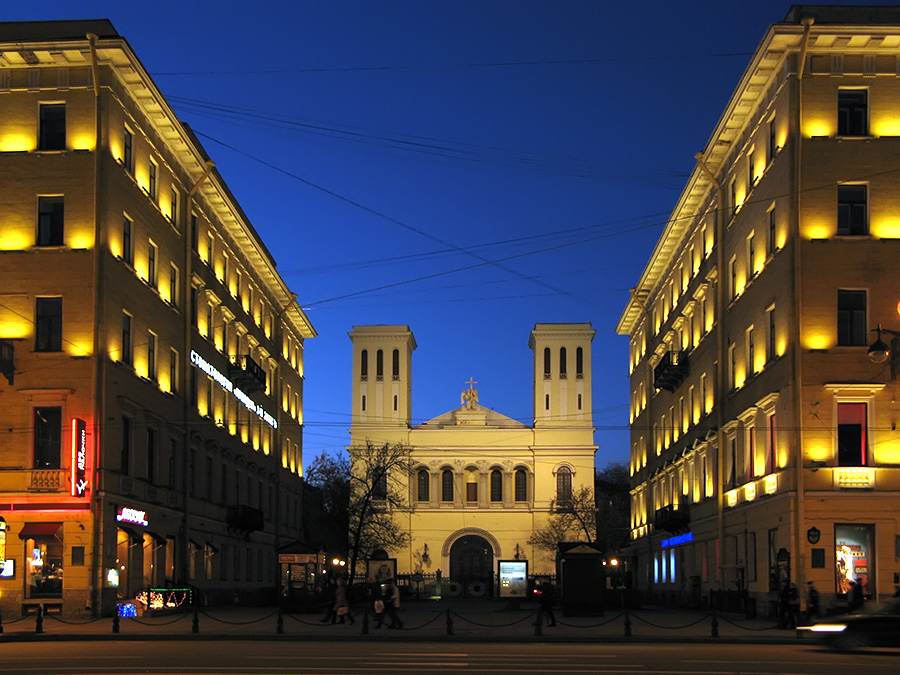
View of the church from Nevsky Prospekt

In 1760-1762 a new church school building was built. The reign of Catherine II, who favored her fellow Germans, had a very good effect on the life of the community. The Empress made donations to the church treasury and took the school under her patronage. By 1794, there were 2 000 communicants in the Lutheran community of Petrikirche.

=== Modernity ===
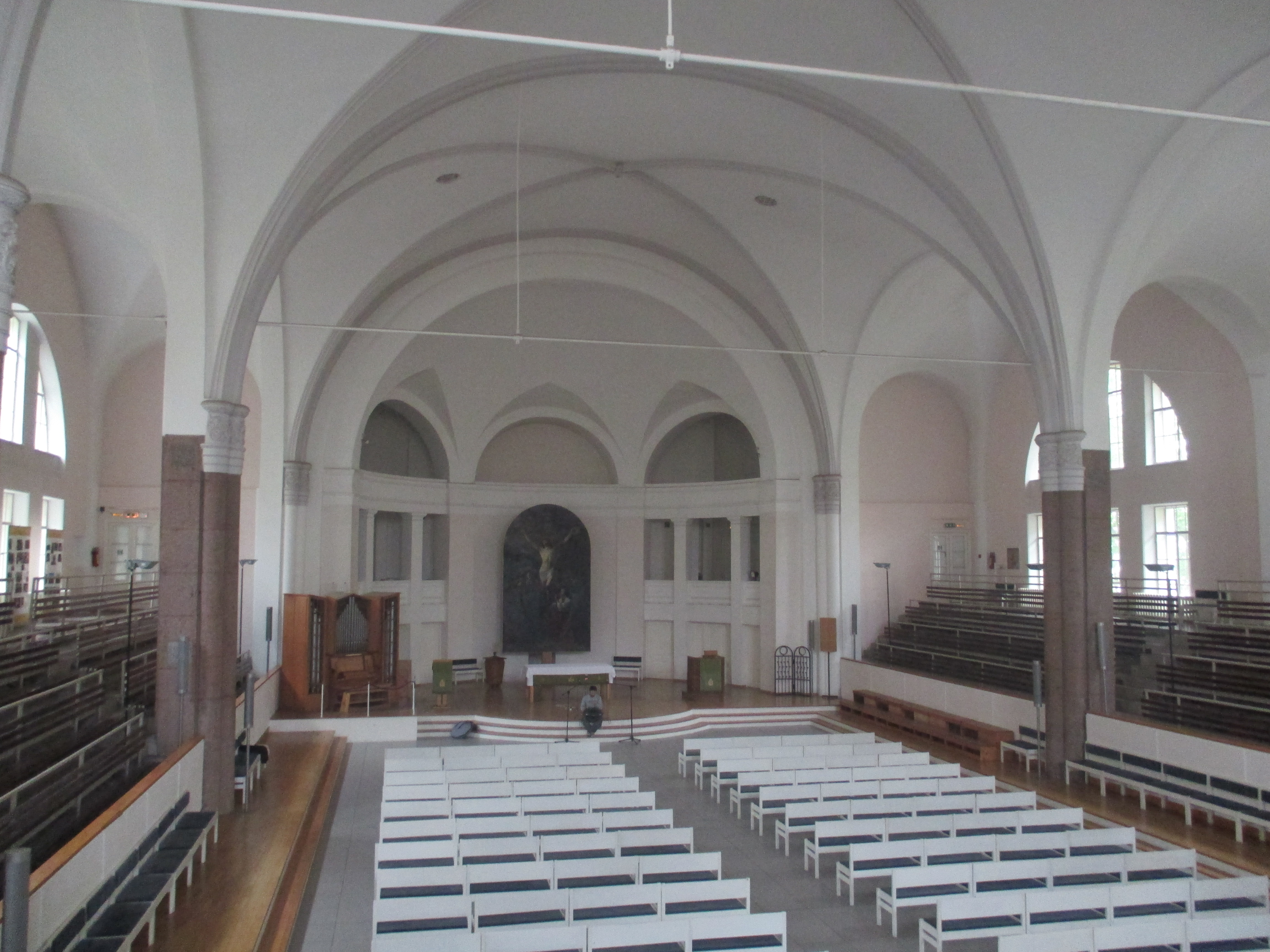
The interior of Petrikirche in its modern form

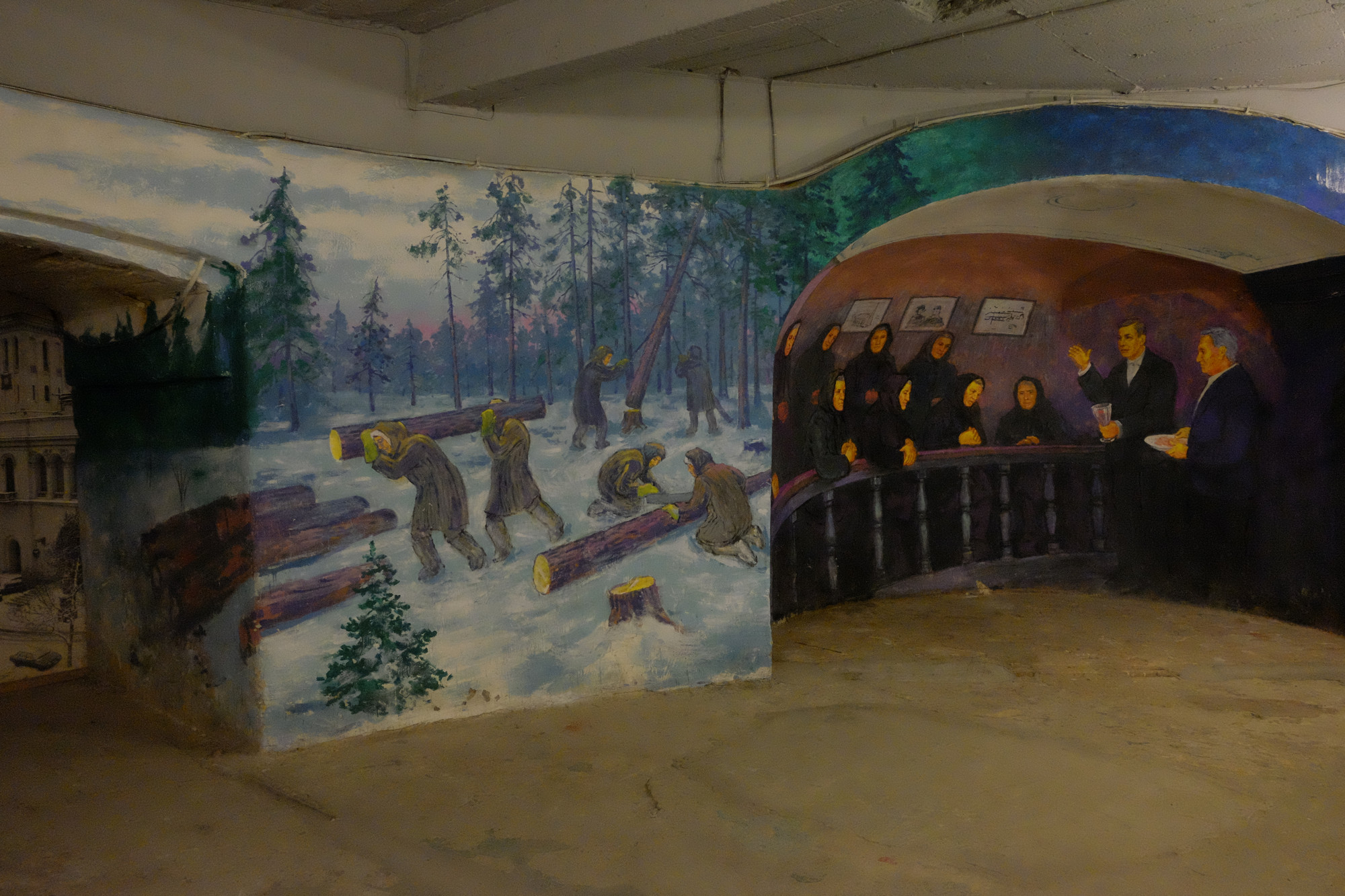
Murals by Adam Schmidt in the "Catacombs" of Petrikirche

On 31 October 1992, the first service took place in the Cathedral of Sts. Peter and Paul. The building was officially returned to believers in June 1993, but the process of reconstruction of the building dragged on until 1997, when it was solemnly re-dedicated on 16 September.

By 2003, the cathedral community (German: Deutschen evangelisch-lutherischen St.-Annen- und St.-Petri-Gemeinde) consisted of 700 parishioners, and in 2013 - 650.

The parish has Bible seminars, handicraft circles, a "clothes room", "diaconia" (patronage of elderly parish members), a community council, and a council of seniors. The community organizes charity concerts, tours of the church building and the Catacombs.

The catacombs have a basin bowl, a surrounding basement with bases of granite pylons at the level of the old church hall, as well as murals with Christian symbols, completed in 2007 by American neo-expressionist artist Matt Lamb together with students from art schools in St. Petersburg. Under the altar, in the crypt, there is a chapel designed by the Russian German artist Adam Schmidt. These wall paintings, also created in 2007, are dedicated to the fate of the Russian Germans in Stalin’s Soviet Union and include six episodes (the deposition of the cross from the church, arrest in an apartment, deportation through the prison camp, logging ("labor army"), secret worship (communion) of the fraternal community on home, labor camp in Vorkuta). Thus, the basement of Petrikirche is not only a kind of art space, but also a memorial to the victims of Stalin's repressions. On certain days, services and prayer hours are held at the catacombs. The bowl of the old pool periodically serves as a backdrop for various theatrical productions. Exhibitions are often held at the catacombs.

On 31 October 2019, the official opening of the updated permanent exhibition dedicated to Petrikirche took place in the cathedral. The exhibition is located on the first floor, in the left wing of the church. In addition to stands telling the history of the community and the building from the time of construction to the present day, the exhibition presents a variety of artifacts, including old liturgical books, utensils and reproductions of stained glass windows of the Petrikirche, now stored in the storerooms of the Hermitage Museum. There are also two bronze models (one depicting the avenue of the lost Walcker organ, the other the Petrikirche building, based on the 1867 model kept in the Museum of the Russian Academy of Arts).

In 1993, the third floor of the administrative part of the building was equipped to create the Russian-German Meeting Center, whose task is to revive and develop the cultural heritage of Russian Germans and conduct dialogue between Germans and representatives of other nationalities. The meeting center conducts German language courses, organizes youth exchanges, vacation programs, and summer linguistic camps. In the summer of 2020, the Russian-German Meeting Center moved from Petrikirche to the building located to the right of the church, at Nevsky, 22. The Theological Seminary of the Evangelical Lutheran Church of Russia now operates in the annex to the church where the Center was previously located.

== Music ==
=== Organ ===
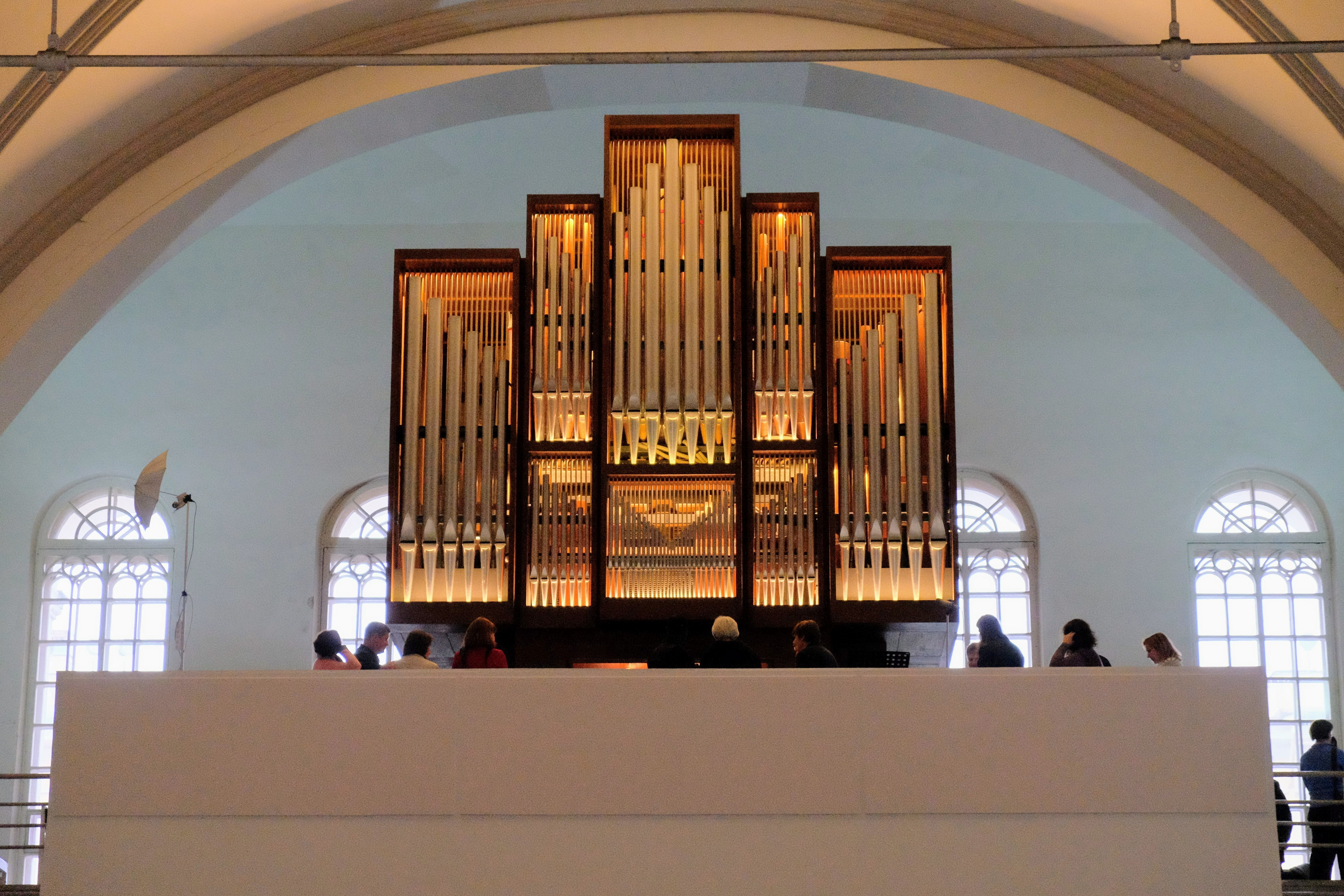
Organ Willi Peter, 1 July 2017

In 1997–1998, a small organ from the German company «G. Steinmann» was installed in the church. The instrument was built in 1958 and was originally located in the Church Conservatory of Herford, Germany.

In April 2017, an organ from the German company Willi Peter from the German Church, Stockholm was transported to Petrikirche - a large instrument with 43 registers, three manuals and a pedal. On 1 June of the same year, work on its installation and intonation was completed by specialists from the Rudolf von Beckerath company. The first organ concert took place on 1 July 2017.

The ceremonial consecration of the Willy Peter organ with the participation of representatives of St. Petersburg and the Federal Republic of Germany, as well as representatives of the Nordkirche association (Evangelical Lutheran Church in Northern Germany) took place on 28 September 2017.

== Literature ==
- Die St. Petri-Gemeinde. Zwei Jahrhunderte evangelischen Gemeindelebens in St. Petersburg: 1710—1910. St. Petersburg, 1910.
- Petrikirche, St. Petersburg / Церковь св. Петра, Санкт-Петербург. Приложение к журналу Евангелическо-лютеранской церкви в России, на Украине, Казахстане и Средней Азии «Дер Боте» / Вестник. СПб., 1998.
- Евангелическо-лютеранская церковь Св. Петра и Павла в С.-Петербурге: Строительная история, восстановление функции и реконструкция здания в 1994–1997 годах / Сост. и ред. С. Г. Федоров. – Karlsruhe: Universitat Karlsruhe, 2003. 141 с.
- Кириков Б. М. Золотой треугольник Петербурга. М., СПб.:, 2017. С. 173—224.
- Кравчун П. Н. Органы лютеранской церкви св. Петра в Санкт-Петербурге. — СПб.: «Роза мира», 2011. — 120 с.
- Ломтев Д.Г. Хоровые общества при евангелическо-лютеранских церквях Санкт-Петербурга // Обсерватория культуры, 2011, № 2, с. 77—81.
- Никитин А. Немецкая Евангелическо-лютеранская церковь Св. Петра. // Немцы в России (Петербургские немцы). Отв. ред. Г. И. Смагина. СПб., 1999. С. 281—320.
- Таценко Т. Н. Немецкие Евангелическо-Лютеранские общины в Санкт-Петербурге в XVIII—XX вв. // Немцы в России (Петербургские немцы)… — С. 245—280.
