= Zapolyarny, Komi Republic =

Zapolyarny Заполярный
- Urban-type settlement

Other transcription(s)
  - Komi: Заполярнӧй
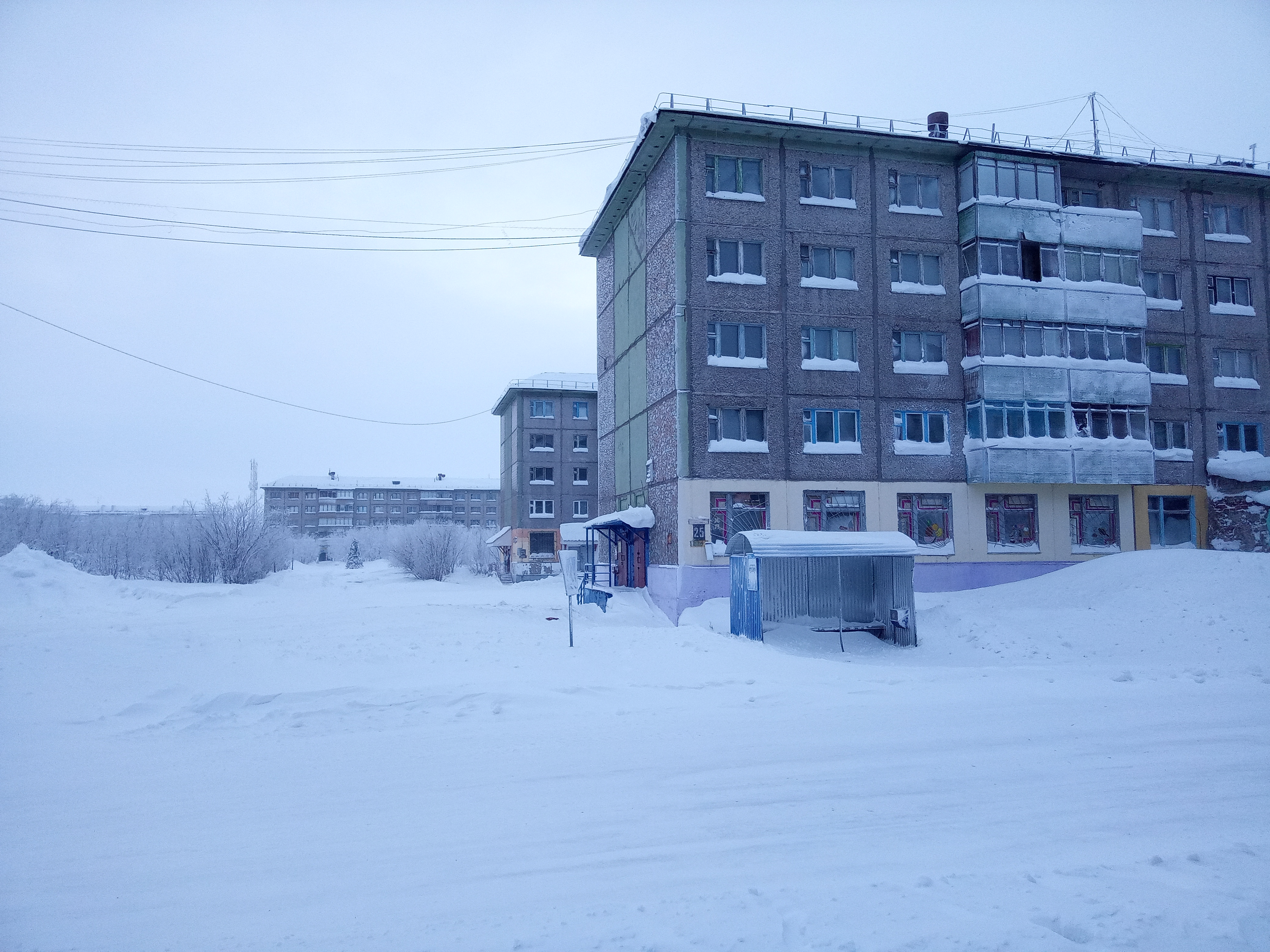
- Interactive map of Zapolyarny
- Location of Zapolyarny Zapolyarny (Komi Republic)
- Coordinates: 67°29′46″N 63°43′51″E
- Country: Russia
- Federal subject: Komi Republic
- Urban-type settlement administrative territorySelsoviet: Komsomolsky Urban-Type Settlement Administrative Territory
- Founded: 1955

Population (2010 Census)
  - Total: 1,948
  - Estimate (2024): 460 (−76.4%)

Administrative status
  - Subordinated to: town of republic significance of Vorkuta

Municipal status
  - Urban okrug: Vorkuta Urban Okrug
- Time zone: UTC+3 (MSK)
- Postal code: 169936
- OKTMO ID: 87710000066

Zapolyarny population
- 2010 Census: 1,948
- 2002 Census: 4,708
- 1989 Census: 7,760
- 1979 Census: 7,964

Zapolyarny (Russian: Заполя́рный; Komi: Заполярнӧй, Zapolarnöj) is an urban locality (an urban-type settlement) under the administrative jurisdiction of the town of republic significance of Vorkuta in the Komi Republic, Russia. As of the 2010 Census, its population was 1,948.

== Administrative and municipal status ==
Within the framework of administrative divisions, the urban-type settlement of Zapolyarny is subordinated to Komsomolsky Urban-Type Settlement Administrative Territory, which is itself subordinated to the town of republic significance of Vorkuta. Within the framework of municipal divisions, Zapolyarny is a part of Vorkuta Urban Okrug.
