= Bella Ratchinskaia =

Russian ballet dancer (born 1953)

- Белла Рачинская
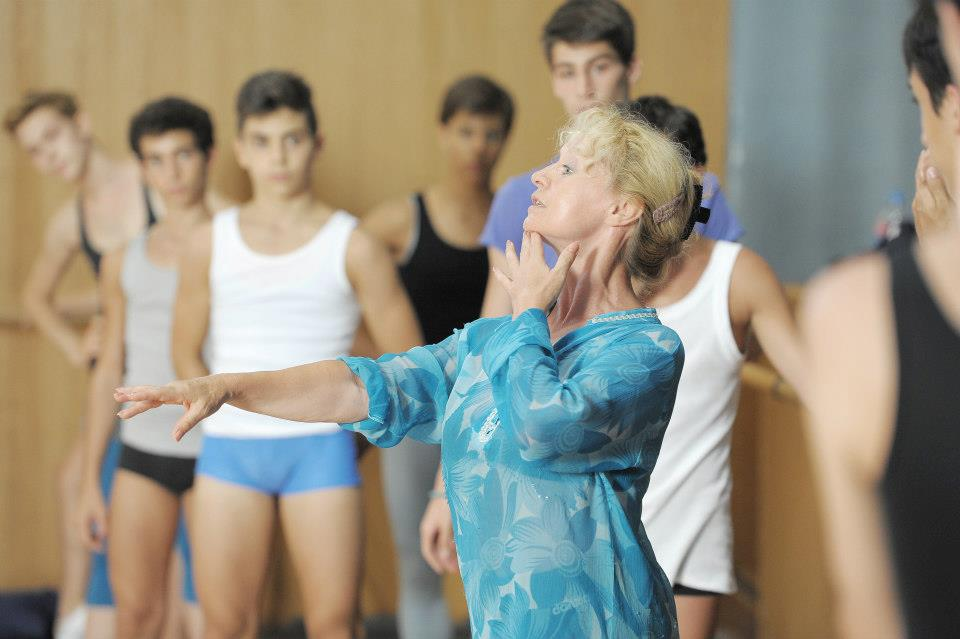
- Born: November 22, 1953; Vorkuta, Russian SFSR, Soviet Union
- Occupations: Ballet choreographer, maître de ballet, ballet pedagogue
- Years active: 1972–present
- Style: Classical ballet
- Career
- Former groups: Choreographic Miniatures

Bella Ratchinskaia (born 22 November 1953 in Vorkuta, USSR) is a classical ballet choreographer and maître de ballet. She is associated with the Vaganova method of classical ballet training.

== Early life and training ==
Ratchinskaia was born on 22 November 1953 and received her professional ballet education at the Perm State Choreographic College, from which she graduated with honours. Following her graduation, she entered the professional stage as a classical dancer trained in the traditions of Soviet ballet pedagogy.

== Performing career ==
In 1972, Ratchinskaia joined the company Choreographic Miniatures led by Leonid Yakobson, where she worked as a soloist and performed the full range of roles from the company’s classical and contemporary repertory. Her interpretations of Yakobson’s choreographic works attracted critical attention during the ensemble’s international tours, where she was noted for both technical precision and expressive clarity.

Alongside her performance career, Ratchinskaia developed an interest in choreography and ballet pedagogy, which would later become central to her professional activity.

== Pedagogical work and international activity ==
In 1976, Ratchinskaia completed the pedagogy programme in classical ballet at the Vaganova Academy, graduating with distinction and receiving formal qualifications as a teacher of classical ballet, character dance, historical dance, and repertory. Immediately after graduation, she joined the Academy’s teaching staff. She simultaneously began collaborating with the Ministry of Culture of Mongolia, where she introduced elements of the Vaganova training system and contributed to the development of professional ballet education.

In 1989, Ratchinskaia relocated to Milan, where she worked as a ballet mistress and teacher at the Teatro alla Scala and its ballet school. During the 1990s and early 2000s, she held teaching and coaching positions with several major European ballet institutions, including the Vienna State Opera Ballet, and collaborated with companies in Italy, Spain, Hungary, and the United States.

Between 1999 and 2003, she served as ballet mistress at the Vienna State Opera under the direction of Renato Zanella, and from 2012 she has continued her professional association with the Vienna State Opera. In recognition of her professional contributions, she was awarded an honorary certificate and insignia by the Ministries of Culture of the USSR and Mongolia in 1989.

Ratchinskaia has been widely known as a ballet pedagogue trained in the Vaganova method and has taught numerous dancers who later joined major European companies or won international ballet competitions. Her teaching career has been largely focused on advanced-level classical ballet training, particularly within institutional academy settings.

== Controversy ==
In 2019, allegations concerning training practices at the Ballet Academy of the Vienna State Opera attracted public attention in Austria. According to the newspaper Falter, former students and observers raised concerns about authoritarian teaching methods and physical discipline within the academy, including allegations directed at Ratchinskaia in her capacity as a ballet teacher there.

According to Falter, Ratchinskaia denied wrongdoing and publicly rejected the accusations, characterising them as exaggerated and politically motivated, and defended physical correction in ballet instruction as a traditional pedagogical tool intended to guide movement rather than cause harm. The newspaper reported that she framed such physical contact as analogous to a sculptor shaping form, a view that critics cited as emblematic of an outdated, authoritarian conception of ballet education.

Contemporary commentary contrasted these positions with modern pedagogical approaches that emphasise bodily autonomy and psychological well-being, noting a broader debate within the ballet world regarding the legitimacy of strict disciplinary traditions. Earlier interviews with Ratchinskaia had highlighted her firm views on discipline, physical standards, and total commitment to the profession, which commentators retrospectively cited as contextual background for the controversy.
