= Promyshlenny =

Promyshlenny (masculine), Promyshlennaya (feminine), or Promyshlennoye (neuter) may refer to:

- Promyshlenny City District, name of several city districts in Russia
- Promyshlenny (inhabited locality) (Promyshlennaya, Promyshlennoye), name of several inhabited localities in Russia
