= Komsomolsky, Komi Republic =

Komsomolsky Комсомольский
- Urban-type settlement

Other transcription(s)
  - Komi: Комсомольскӧй
- Interactive map of Komsomolsky
- Location of Komsomolsky Komsomolsky (Komi Republic)
- Coordinates: 67°33′08″N 63°47′07″E
- Country: Russia
- Federal subject: Komi Republic
- Urban-type settlement administrative territorySelsoviet: Komsomolsky Urban-Type Settlement Administrative Territory

Population (2010 Census)
  - Total: 1,047
  - Estimate (2024): 128 (−87.8%)

Administrative status
  - Subordinated to: town of republic significance of Vorkuta
  - Capital of: Komsomolsky Urban-Type Settlement Administrative Territory

Municipal status
  - Urban okrug: Vorkuta Urban Okrug
- Time zone: UTC+3 (MSK)
- Postal code: 169935
- OKTMO ID: 87710000071

Komsomolsky population
- 2010 Census: 1,047
- 2002 Census: 4,046
- 1989 Census: 14,805
- 1979 Census: 14,885

Komsomolsky (Russian: Комсомо́льский; Komi: Комсомольскӧй, Komsomoľsköj) is an urban locality (an urban-type settlement) under the administrative jurisdiction of the town of republic significance of Vorkuta in the Komi Republic, Russia. As of the 2010 Census, its population was 1,047.

== Administrative and municipal status ==
Within the framework of administrative divisions, the urban-type settlement of Komsomolsky, together with two other urban-type settlements (Mulda and Zapolyarny), is incorporated as Komsomolsky Urban-Type Settlement Administrative Territory, which is subordinated to the town of republic significance of Vorkuta. Within the framework of municipal divisions, Komsomolsky is a part of Vorkuta Urban Okrug.
