= Severny, Komi Republic =

Severny Северный
- Urban-type settlement

Other transcription(s)
  - Komi: Севернöй
- Interactive map of Severny
- Location of Severny Severny (Komi Republic)
- Coordinates: 67°36′10″N 64°06′51″E
- Country: Russia
- Federal subject: Komi Republic
- Urban-type settlement administrative territorySelsoviet: Severny Urban-Type Settlement Administrative Territory

Population (2010 Census)
  - Total: 9,023
  - Estimate (2024): 3,680 (−59.2%)

Administrative status
  - Subordinated to: town of republic significance of Vorkuta
  - Capital of: Severny Urban-Type Settlement Administrative Territory

Municipal status
  - Urban okrug: Vorkuta Urban Okrug
- Time zone: UTC+3 (MSK)
- Postal codes: 169926, 169927
- OKTMO ID: 87710000091

Severny population
- 2010 Census: 9,023
- 2002 Census: 12,028
- 1989 Census: 20,428
- 1979 Census: 17,172

Severny (Russian: Се́верный; Komi: Севернöй, Sjevernöj) is an urban locality (an urban-type settlement) under the administrative jurisdiction of the town of republic significance of Vorkuta in the Komi Republic, Russia. As of the 2010 Census, its population was 9,023.

== Administrative and municipal status ==
Within the framework of administrative divisions, the urban-type settlement of Severny, together with another urban-type settlement (Oktyabrsky), is incorporated as Severny Urban-Type Settlement Administrative Territory, which is subordinated to the town of republic significance of Vorkuta. Within the framework of municipal divisions, Severny is a part of Vorkuta Urban Okrug.
