= Promyshlenny City District =

Promyshlenny City District is the name of several city divisions in Russia. The name literally means "industrial".

- Promyshlenny City District, Orenburg, a city district of Orenburg, the administrative center of Orenburg Oblast
- Promyshlenny City District, Samara, an administrative and municipal city district of Samara, the administrative center of Samara Oblast
- Promyshlenny City District, Smolensk, a city district of Smolensk, the administrative center of Smolensk Oblast
- Promyshlenny City District, Stavropol, a city district of Stavropol, the administrative center of Stavropol Krai
- Promyshlenny City District, Vladikavkaz, a city district of Vladikavkaz, the capital of the Republic of North Ossetia–Alania
Cities in Russia with a city division called "Promyshlenny"

== See also ==
- Promyshlenny (disambiguation)
- Industrialny (disambiguation)
