= Vorgashor =

Vorgashor Воргашор
- Urban-type settlement

Other transcription(s)
  - Komi: Вӧргашор
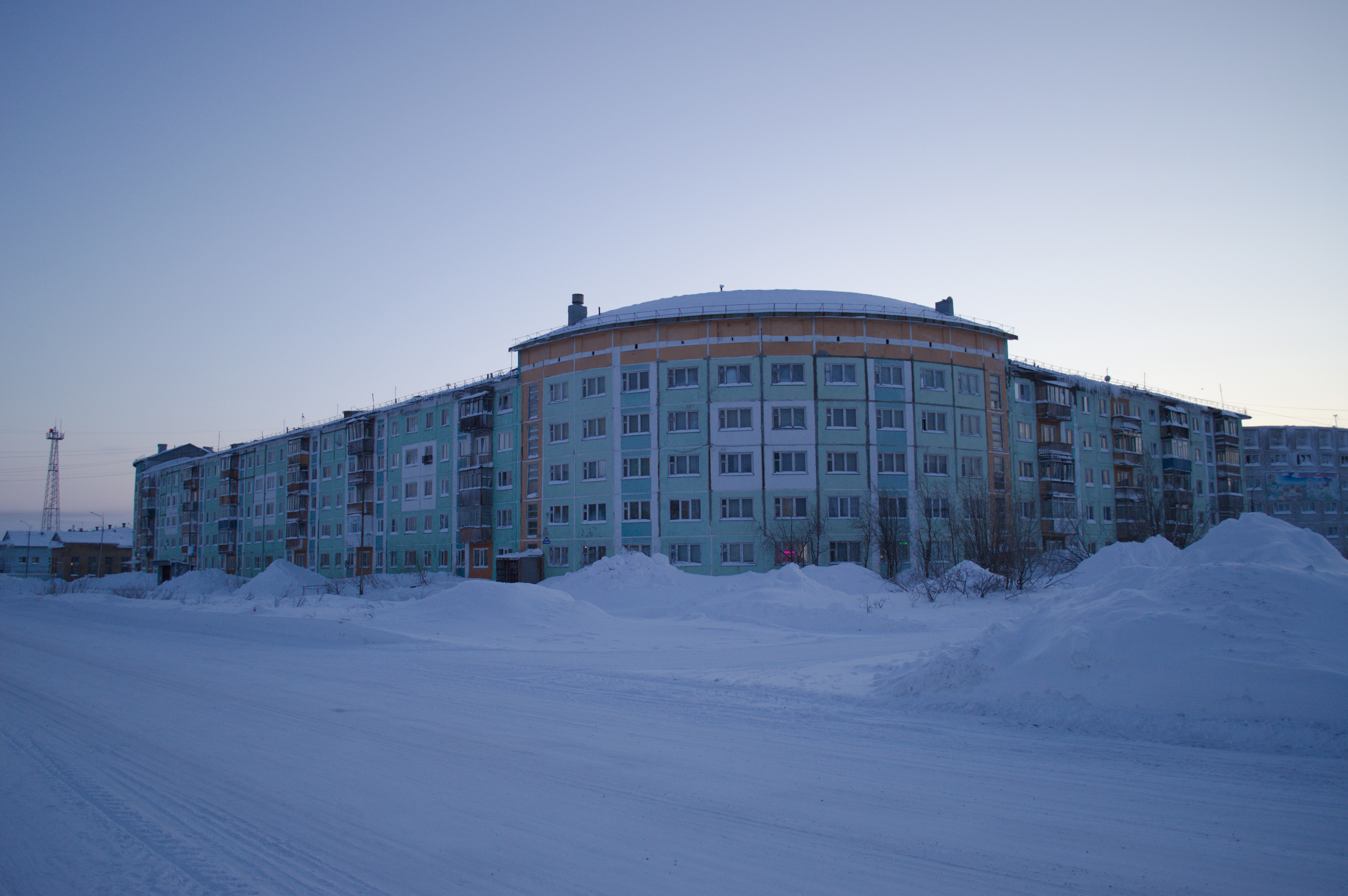
- Interactive map of Vorgashor
- Location of Vorgashor Vorgashor (Komi Republic)
- Coordinates: 67°35′03″N 63°47′49″E
- Country: Russia
- Federal subject: Komi Republic
- Urban-type settlement administrative territorySelsoviet: Vorgashor Urban-Type Settlement Administrative Territory
- Founded: 1964

Population (2010 Census)
  - Total: 12,044
  - Estimate (2025): 6,375 (−47.1%)

Administrative status
  - Subordinated to: town of republic significance of Vorkuta
  - Capital of: Vorgashor Urban-Type Settlement Administrative Territory

Municipal status
  - Urban okrug: Vorkuta Urban Okrug
- Time zone: UTC+3 (MSK)
- Postal codes: 169933, 169934
- OKTMO ID: 87710000056

Vorgashor population
- 2010 Census: 12,044
- 2002 Census: 19,100
- 1989 Census: 24,869
- 1979 Census: 18,488

Vorgashor Russian: Воргашо́р; Komi: Вӧргашор, Vörgašor) is an urban locality (an urban-type settlement) under the administrative jurisdiction of Vorkuta, the town of republic significance in the Komi Republic, Russia, until 1991 Soviet Union. As of the 2010 Census, its population was 12,044.

== Administrative and municipal status ==
Within the framework of administrative divisions, the urban-type settlement of Vorgashor, together with another urban-type settlement (Promyshlenny) and one rural locality (the settlement of Yurshor), is incorporated as Vorgashor Urban-Type Settlement Administrative Territory, which is subordinated to the town of republic significance of Vorkuta. Within the framework of municipal divisions, Vorgashor is a part of Vorkuta Urban Okrug.
