= Matt Lamb =

American painter (1932–2012)

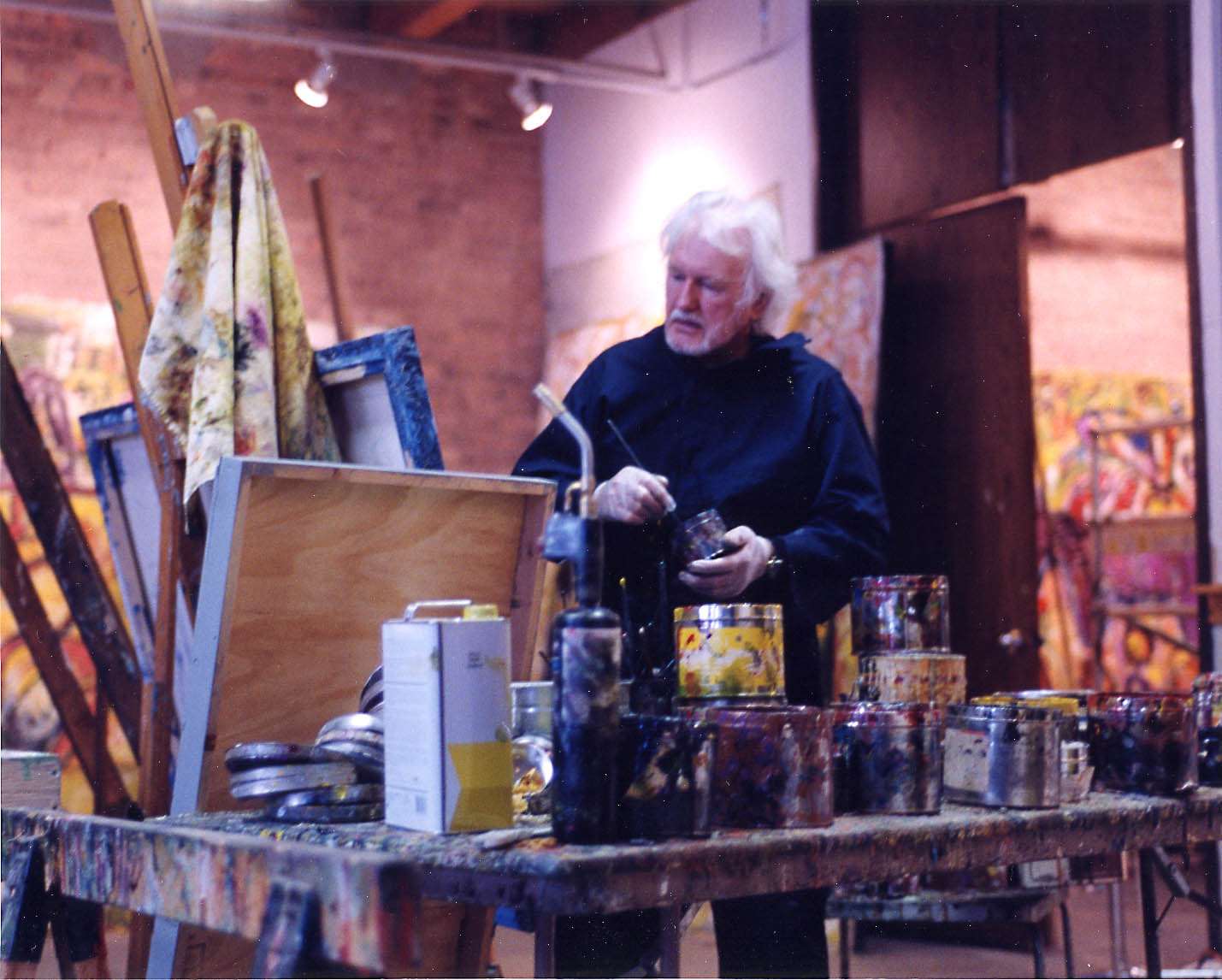
Matt Lamb in 2002 at his studio in Chicago

Matt Lamb (7 April 1932 – February 18, 2012) was an American painter.

== Life ==
Matt Lamb was born in Chicago, Illinois, in 1932. He was the son of a funeral director Matt Lamb Sr. who bought the Blake-Lamb funeral home in 1928. At the age of 18 Matt Lamb Jr. became a partner in the business and transformed the funeral parlor into a prominent chain of funeral enterprises. He married Rosemarie Graham, in 1954, and produced four children. Lamb's business expanded to six different locations by 1970 and continued to expand. In his late 40s, Lamb was diagnosed with mononucleosis complicated by chronic active hepatitis and sarcoidosis of the liver. Repeated medical tests at the Mayo Clinic showed that none of the diseases were still present. He had either been misdiagnosed or miraculously cured. He sold his funeral business in 1986 and opened his first painting studio in Chicago. Lamb decided to use his remaining time to spread his message of peace, tolerance, hope, communication, and love among men with his works of art. In 1988, he established two more studios in Florida and, in 1990, in Wisconsin.

In 1994 Lamb became president of Midwest Patrons of the Arts, Vatican Museum, and director of Vatican Museum Foundation, New York, and opened a fourth studio in Mettlach-Tünsdorf. He opened a fifth studio in 2000 in Paris.

In 2001 the artist created his project "The Lamb Umbrellas for Peace" in response to the terrorist attacks of September 11, 2001. He began with a 3-day workshop in Washington, D.C. for 38 children who had lost their parents in the attack, each of them expressing their feelings in colorful ways on the umbrellas. The workshop was followed by a parade of the children carrying their umbrellas, and the umbrellas were shown on Capitol Hill.

In 2003 the project expanded to Europe, where "The Lamb Umbrellas for Peace" were shown in the European Parliament at Strasbourg, in the German Bundestag and in the two houses of the British Parliament. Since then worldwide 300,000 children have painted screens for peace.

In 2003 Matt Lamb created his tallest work of art in the peace chapel of the parish church of St. Martin in Mettlach-Tünsdorf. "Mary, Queen of Peace" (Regina Pacis / Maria Friedenskönigin), is one of the largest frescos in Europe with a painted surface of 120 m^{2} and has an entry in the Guide Michelin. Lamb dedicated the chapel to the mother of God, whom he regards as embodiment of absolute acceptance and love.

"The only thing we bring into this chappel is our prayer, love, tolerance and acceptance. It's a place of contemplation, renewal and love. We leave here in this place our anxieties, fears, prejudices and intolerance, and cast them down to the underworld. We plead the Holy Spirit and the Blessed Mother for changing our lives, for accepting all that is given to us and to be true men of Christ´s message 'Love one another as I have loved you."

– Matt Lamb

A similar project has been realized by Matt Lamb in 2007, when he painted the pool, built by the soviets, under the Lutheran Church of Saint Peter and Saint Paul in St. Petersburg.

In 2010 Matt Lamb began a friendship with David Leonardis and sat for a video interview on www.chitchatshow.com. The David Leonardis Gallery has the largest collection of Matt Lamb art available for private sale. www.dlgalleries.com/matt-lamb/

Lamb died in Chicago on 18 February 2012 of pulmonary fibrosis. He was 79.

== Works about Matt Lamb ==
1994
Matt Lamb (Exhibition Catalogue) by Ingrid Fassbender
2000
"Just 'a Looking for a Home," by Michael D. Hall, Raw Vision 31 (Summer 2000)
2005
Matt Lamb : The Art of Success by Richard Speer
2007
Matt Lamb by Alexander Borovsky
2010
Matt Lamb Ausstellung Berlin 2010 by Matt Lamb
2013
Matt Lamb : The Art of Success Revised Edition by Richard Speer

== Selected exhibitions ==
1996

Palais du Glace, Buenos Aires Sixtie Chapel, Vatican Museum

2000

Millennium Project Westminster Cathedral, London

2003

Presentation of Lamb Umbrellas for Peace in the European Parliament in Strasbourg, in the German Bundestag in Berlin, im House of Lords und im House of Commons, London Picasso Museum, Horta, Spain

2004

Centre Miró, Mont-roig, Catalonien Irish Museum, Ireland

2007

Hermitage, Russian Museum St. Petersburg Kleisthaus, Bundesministerium für Arbeit und Soziales, Berlin, Deutschland Real Artistic Circle, Barcelona, Spanien Maricel Museum, Sitges, Spain Pia Almoina, Barcelona, Spain

2013

Pakistan
Dead Sea, Jordan
German Tax Payers Association Französische Berlin, Germany
JW Marriott, Dubai
Various locations throughout Cork, Ireland
Opening of the 1st Berlin (Germany) daycare center "Matt Lamb" of TWSD (Trägerwerk Soziale Dienste gGmbH)
Košice, Slovakia

2014

Mending Kids International Fundraiser at House of Blues LA, California, USA
