= Oktyabrsky, Komi Republic =

Oktyabrsky Октябрьский
- Urban-type settlement
- Interactive map of Oktyabrsky
- Location of Oktyabrsky Oktyabrsky (Komi Republic)
- Coordinates: 67°34′N 64°08′E
- Country: Russia
- Federal subject: Komi Republic
- Urban-type settlement administrative territorySelsoviet: Severny Urban-Type Settlement Administrative Territory

Population (2010 Census)
  - Total: 0
  - Estimate (2021): 0 )

Administrative status
  - Subordinated to: town of republic significance of Vorkuta

Municipal status
  - Urban okrug: Vorkuta Urban Okrug
- Time zone: UTC+3 (MSK)
- Postal code: 169925
- OKTMO ID: 87710000081

Oktyabrsky population
- 2010 Census: 0
- 2002 Census: 660
- 1989 Census: 3,729
- 1979 Census: 5,233

Oktyabrsky (Russian: Октя́брьский) is an urban locality (an urban-type settlement) under the administrative jurisdiction of the town of republic significance of Vorkuta in the Komi Republic, Russia. It had no recorded population as of the 2010 Census.

== Administrative and municipal status ==
Within the framework of administrative divisions, the urban-type settlement of Oktyabrsky is subordinated to Severny Urban-Type Settlement Administrative Territory, which is itself subordinated to the town of republic significance of Vorkuta. Within the framework of municipal divisions, Oktyabrsky is a part of Vorkuta Urban Okrug.
