= Industrialny (rural locality) =

Industrialny (Russian: Индустриа́льный; masculine), Industrialnaya (Индустриа́льная; feminine), or Industrialnoye (Индустриа́льное; neuter) is the name of several rural localities in Russia:

- Industrialny, Krasnodar Krai, a settlement in Kalininsky Rural Okrug under the administrative jurisdiction of the City of Krasnodar, Krasnodar Krai
- Industrialny, Rostov Oblast, a settlement in Industrialnoye Rural Settlement of Kasharsky District of Rostov Oblast
- Industrialny, Saratov Oblast, a settlement in Yekaterinovsky District of Saratov Oblast
- Industrialny, Republic of Tatarstan, a settlement in Aksubayevsky District of the Republic of Tatarstan
