= Promyshlenny, Komi Republic =

Promyshlenny Промышленный
- Urban-type settlement
- Interactive map of Promyshlenny
- Location of Promyshlenny Promyshlenny (Komi Republic)
- Coordinates: 67°37′N 63°55′E
- Country: Russia
- Federal subject: Komi Republic
- Urban-type settlement administrative territorySelsoviet: Vorgashor Urban-Type Settlement Administrative Territory
- Founded: 1956

Population (2010 Census)
  - Total: 0
  - Estimate (2021): 0 )

Administrative status
  - Subordinated to: Town of republic significance of Vorkuta

Municipal status
  - Urban okrug: Vorkuta Urban Okrug
- Time zone: UTC+3 (MSK)
- Postal code: 169932
- OKTMO ID: 87710000086

Promyshlenny population
- 2010 Census: 0
- 2002 Census: 1,170
- 1989 Census: 8,465
- 1979 Census: 10,313

Promyshlenny (Russian: Промы́шленный) is an abandoned urban locality (an urban-type settlement) under the administrative jurisdiction of the town of republic significance of Vorkuta in the Komi Republic, Russia. It had no recorded population as of the 2010 Census.

== History ==
Promyshlenny was established in 1956 as a mining community in relation to the "Tsentralnoy" and "Promyshlennoy" coal mines. The housing was built by convicts who worked at the mines. A major underground explosion in 1998 killed 23 miners and closed the mines. This led to a rapid economic decline and as a consequence the authorities decided to resettle the population elsewhere. The population prior to the explosion was a little over 1,000 people.

== Administrative and municipal status ==
Within the framework of administrative divisions, the urban-type settlement of Promyshlenny is subordinated to Vorgashor Urban-Type Settlement Administrative Territory, which is itself subordinated to the town of republic significance of Vorkuta. Within the framework of municipal divisions, Promyshlenny is a part of Vorkuta Urban Okrug.
