= Vorkuta (river) =

River in Komi Republic, Russia

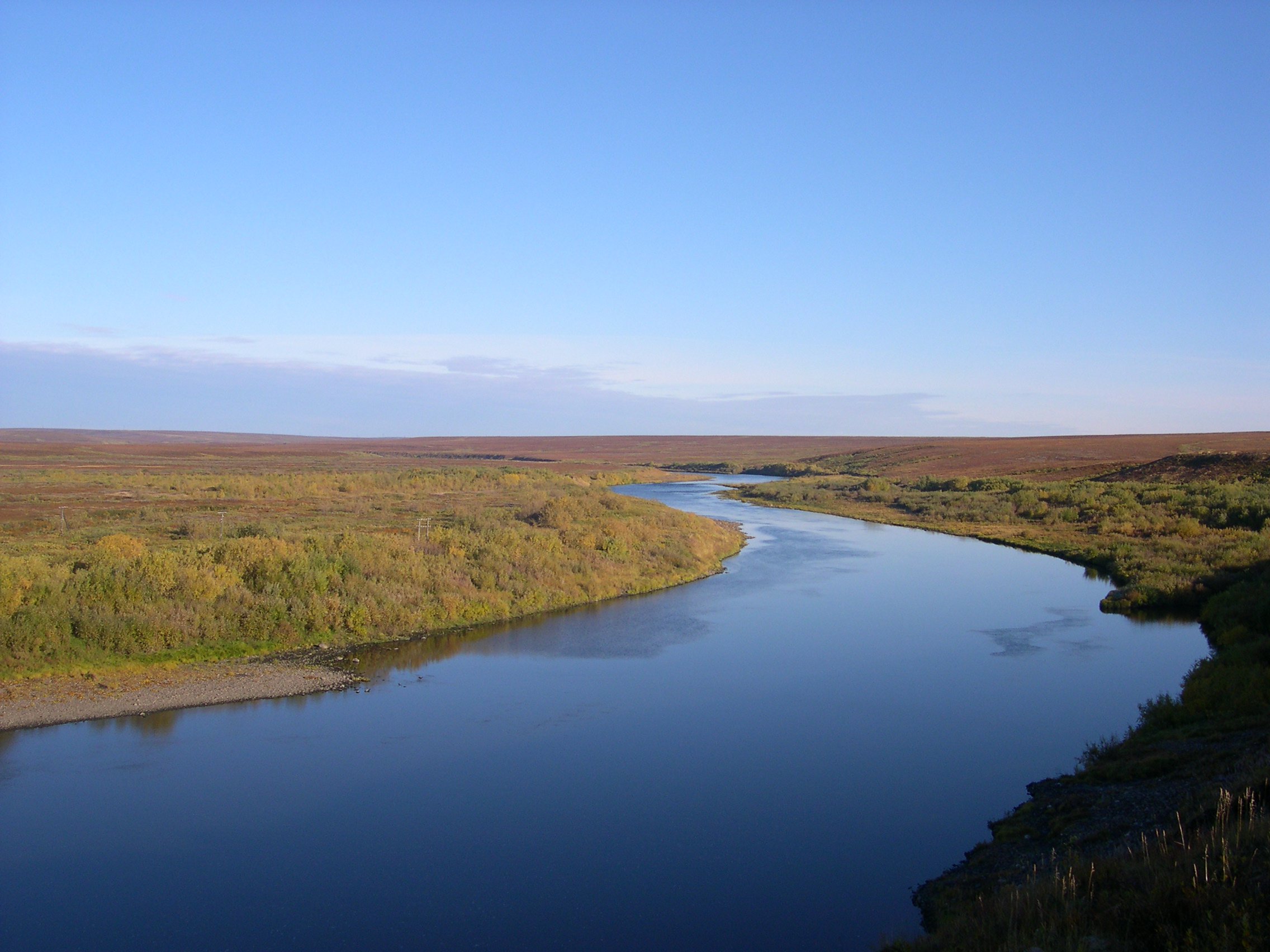
- Vorkuta

Physical characteristics
- Mouth: Usa
  - coordinates: 67.0472°N 63.6411°E
- Length: 182 km (113 mi)
- Basin size: 4,550 km^{2} (1,760 sq mi)

Basin features
- Progression: Usa→ Pechora→ Barents Sea

The Vorkuta (Russian: Воркута) is a river in Komi Republic, Russia. It is a right tributary of the Usa. It is 182 kilometres (113 mi) long, and has a drainage basin of 4,550 square kilometres (1,760 sq mi). The city Vorkuta lies on its banks.
