= Iryna Vdovychenko =

Museum director in Crimea

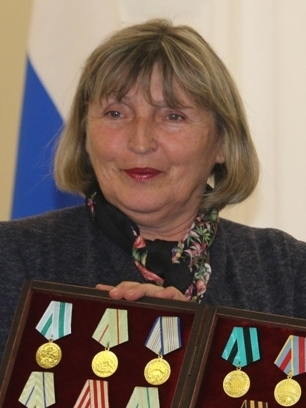
- Iryna Vdovychenko, 2019
- Born: 1955 (age 70–71); Simferopol
- Education: Simferopol State University
- Employer: Museum of the History of the City of Simferopol

Iryna Ivanivna Vdovichenko (Ukrainian: Ірина Іванівна Вдовиченко; born 1955, Simferopol) is a classical archaeologist whose work examines the archaeology of the northern Black Sea region and has worked on the representation of women on vases from this area. At school she participated in excavations near the village of Chernozemnoye (uk) in the Sovietskyi Raion, which influenced her career choices. A graduate of Simferopol State University, Vdovychenko has previously worked as a researcher at the Scientific and Research Center of Crimean Administration under the State Committee for the Protection and Research of Monuments of History and Culture of the Autonomous Republic of Crimea. She is the director of the Museum of the History of the City of Simferopol, which opened in June 2009.
