= Mulda, Russia =

Mulda Мульда
- Urban-type settlement
- Interactive map of Mulda
- Location of Mulda Mulda (Komi Republic)
- Coordinates: 67°29′00″N 63°40′45″E
- Country: Russia
- Federal subject: Komi Republic
- Urban-type settlement administrative territorySelsoviet: Komsomolsky Urban-Type Settlement Administrative Territory

Population (2010 Census)
  - Total: 0
  - Estimate (2024): 11 )

Administrative status
  - Subordinated to: town of republic significance of Vorkuta

Municipal status
  - Urban okrug: Vorkuta Urban Okrug
- Time zone: UTC+3 (MSK)
- Postal code: 169936
- OKTMO ID: 87710000076

Mulda population
- 2010 Census: 0
- 2002 Census: 183
- 1989 Census: 1,224
- 1979 Census: 1,543

Mulda (Russian: Мульда) was an urban locality (an urban-type settlement) under the administrative jurisdiction of the town of republic significance of Vorkuta in the Komi Republic, Russia. It had no recorded population as of the 2010 Census.

== Administrative and municipal status ==
Within the framework of administrative divisions, the urban-type settlement of Mulda is subordinated to Komsomolsky Urban-Type Settlement Administrative Territory, which is itself subordinated to the town of republic significance of Vorkuta. Within the framework of municipal divisions, Mulda is a part of Vorkuta Urban Okrug.
