= Yeletsky, Komi Republic =

Yeletsky Елецкий
- Urban-type settlement
- Interactive map of Yeletsky
- Location of Yeletsky Yeletsky (Komi Republic)
- Coordinates: 67°03′N 64°13′E
- Country: Russia
- Federal subject: Komi Republic
- Urban-type settlement administrative territorySelsoviet: Yeletsky Urban-Type Settlement Administrative Territory

Population (2010 Census)
  - Total: 631
  - Estimate (2024): 295 (−53.2%)

Administrative status
  - Subordinated to: town of republic significance of Vorkuta
  - Capital of: Yeletsky Urban-Type Settlement Administrative Territory

Municipal status
  - Urban okrug: Vorkuta Urban Okrug
- Time zone: UTC+3 (MSK)
- Postal code: 169945
- OKTMO ID: 87710000061

Historical population
Year	Pop.
2010	631
2002	780
1989	1,225
1979	1,193

Yeletsky (Russian: Елецкий) is an urban locality (an urban-type settlement) under the administrative jurisdiction of the town of republic significance of Vorkuta in the Komi Republic, Russia. As of the 2010 Census, its population was 631.

== Administrative and municipal status ==
Within the framework of administrative divisions, the urban-type settlement of Yeletsky, together with two rural localities, is incorporated as Yeletsky Urban-Type Settlement Administrative Territory, which is subordinated to the town of republic significance of Vorkuta. Within the framework of municipal divisions, Yeletsky is a part of Vorkuta Urban Okrug.
