= Vorkuta =

Town in the Komi Republic, Russia

Vorkuta Воркута
- Town

Other transcription(s)
  - Komi: Вӧркута
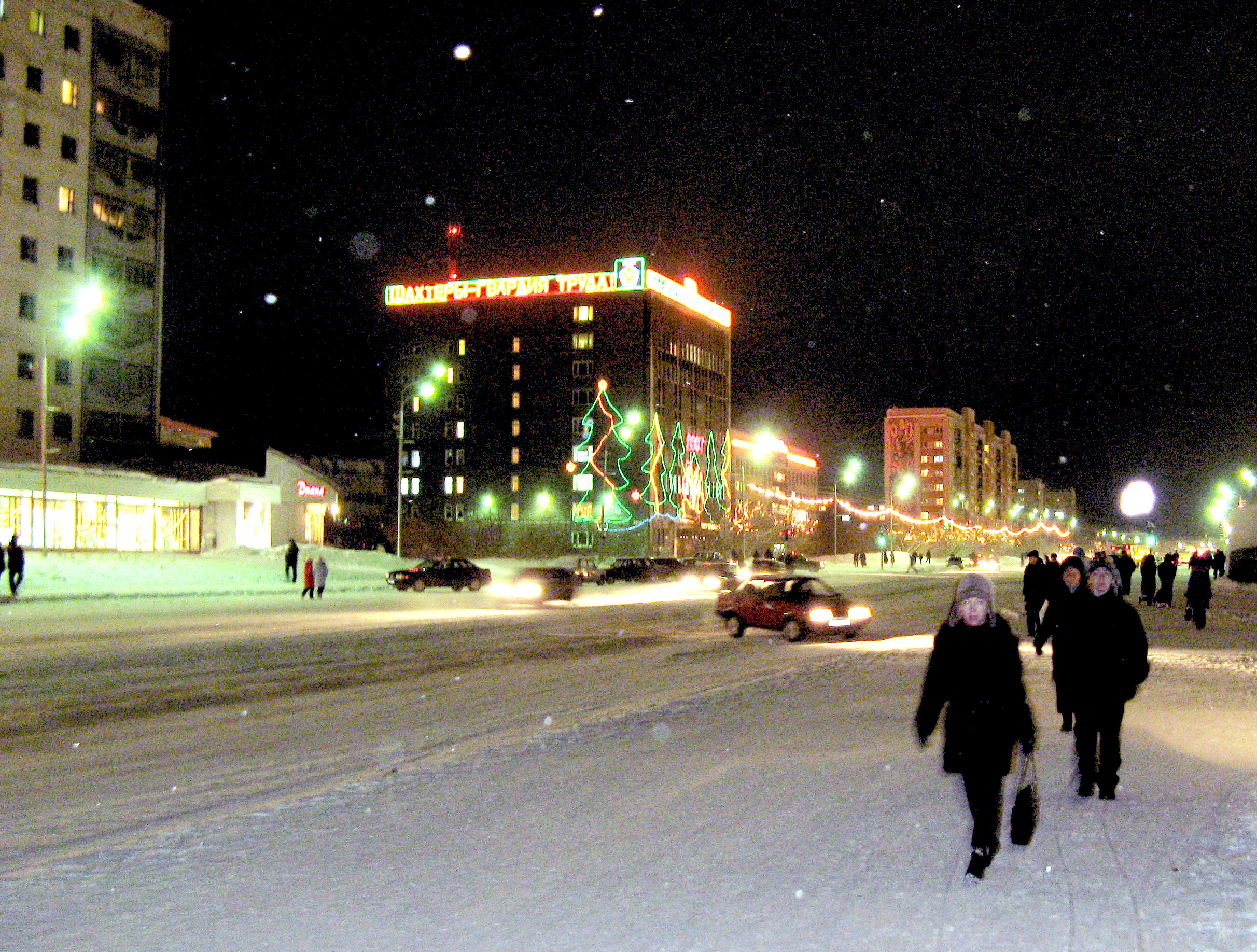
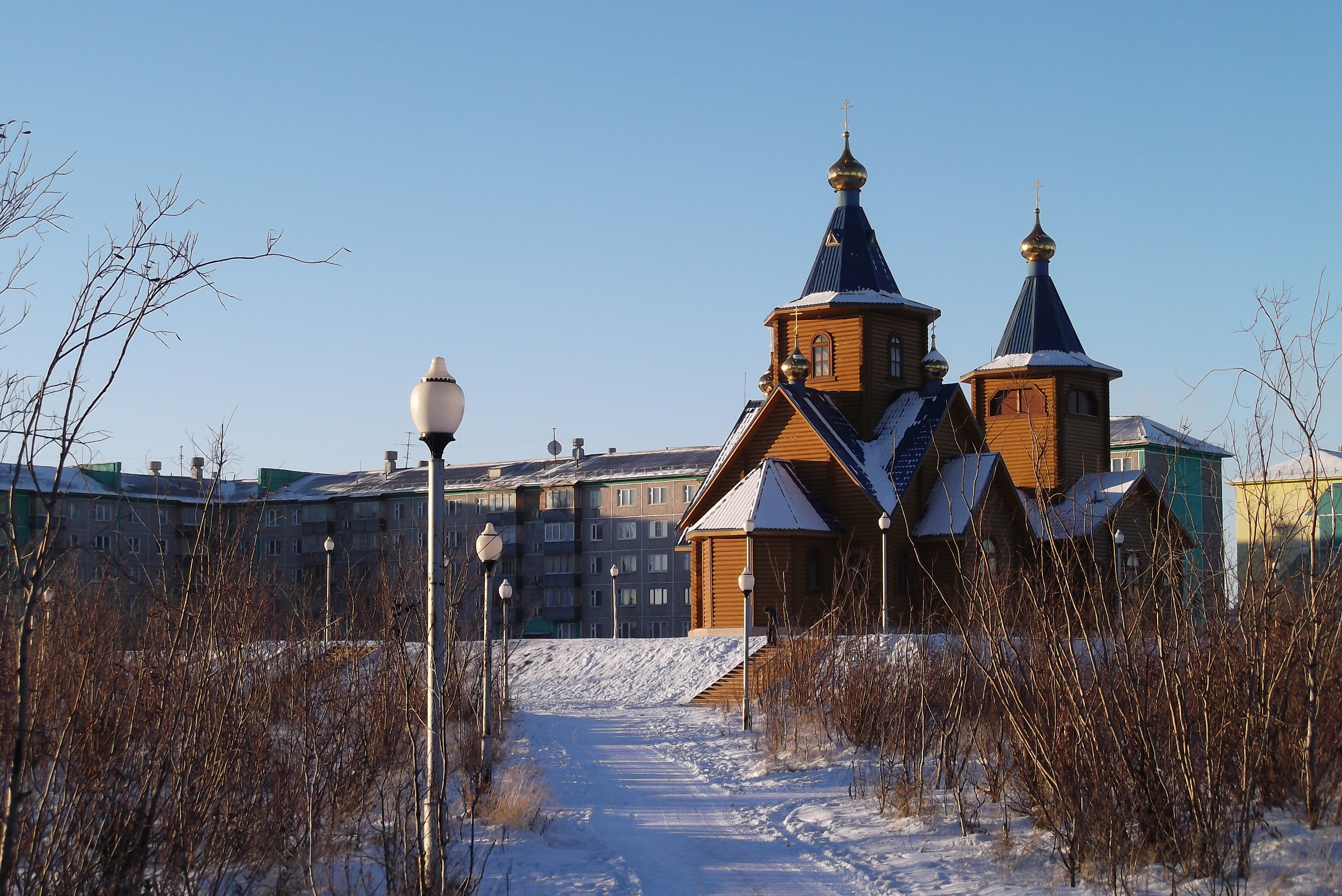
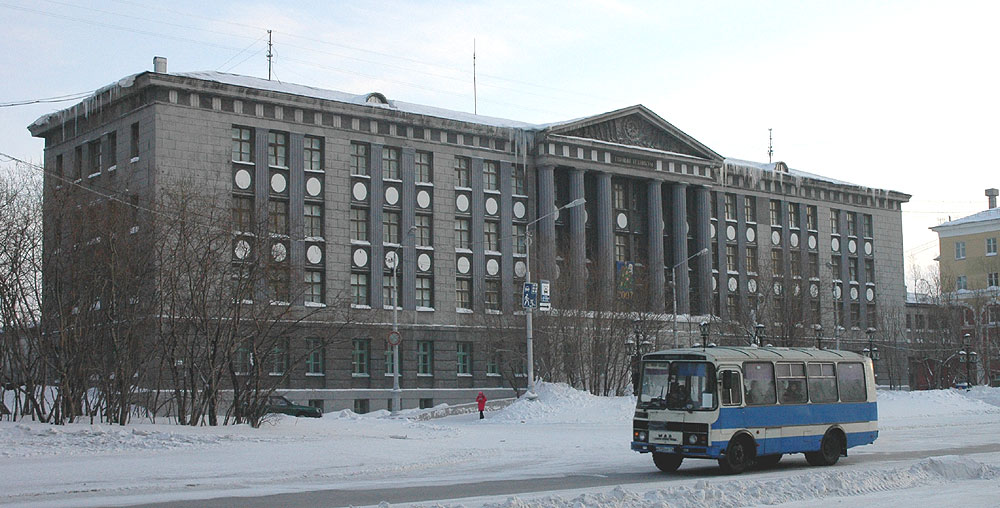

- Flag Coat of arms
- Interactive map of Vorkuta
- Location of Vorkuta Vorkuta (European Russia) Vorkuta (Arctic)
- Coordinates: 67°30′N 64°02′E
- Country: Russia
- Federal subject: Komi Republic
- Founded: January 4, 1936
- Town status since: November 26, 1943

Government
  - Administration Manager: Yaroslav Shaposhnikov

Area
  - Total: 28.69 km^{2} (11.08 sq mi)
- Elevation: 180 m (590 ft)

Population (2010 Census)
  - Total: 70,548
  - Estimate (2025): 55,702 (−21%)
  - Rank: 224th in 2010
  - Density: 2,459/km^{2} (6,369/sq mi)

Administrative status
  - Subordinated to: town of republic significance of Vorkuta
  - Capital of: town of republic significance of Vorkuta

Municipal status
  - Urban okrug: Vorkuta Urban Okrug
  - Capital of: Vorkuta Urban Okrug
- Time zone: UTC+3 (MSK)
- Postal code: 169900
- Dialing code: +7 82151
- OKTMO ID: 87710000001

Vorkuta (Russian: Воркута́; Komi: Вӧркута, romanized: Vörkuta) is a coal-mining town and the third most-populous city in the Komi Republic of Russia, situated just north of the Arctic Circle in the Pechora coal basin, at the river Vorkuta. Population: 56,985 (2021 census); 70,548 (2010 census); 84,917 (2002 census); 115,646 (1989 Soviet census).

Vorkuta is among the five most populous cities north of the Arctic Circle and the easternmost town in Europe. It has the coldest recorded temperature of any European city, at −52 °C (−61 °F).

Vorkuta's population has dropped steadily since the fall of the Soviet Union, when mines were privatized and many people began moving farther south. Many of the mines have been abandoned, and by September 2020, the city's estimated population was only about 50,000. In 2026, it was reported that its population is shrinking faster than any other city in Russia.

== Etymology ==
The name is derived from the Nenets word warkuta, meaning 'numerous bears'.

== History ==
In 1930, the geologist Georgy Chernov (1906–2009) discovered substantial coal fields by the river Vorkuta. Georgy Chernov's father, the geologist Alexander Chernov (1877–1963), promoted the development of the Pechora coal basin, which included the Vorkuta fields. With this discovery the coal-mining industry started in the Komi ASSR. At the time, only the southern parts of the field were included in the Komi ASSR. The northern part, including Vorkuta, belonged to the Nenets Autonomous Okrug of Arkhangelsk Oblast. In 1931, a geologist settlement was established by the coal field, with most of the workers being inmates of the Ukhta-Pechora Camp of the GULAG (Ухтпечлаг, Ukhtpechlag).

Miners in Vorkuta were active participants in the 1989 Soviet miners' strikes.

One of the largest coal mine disasters in Russia occurred at Vorkuta coal mine on February 28, 2016, when leaking methane gas ignited and killed 32 people, including 26 trapped miners who had been stranded by a similar explosion three days earlier that had killed four miners.

A CNN report in March 2021 described the villages surrounding Vorkuta as "ghost towns", with many "abandoned structures".

=== Forced labour camp ===
The origins of the town of Vorkuta are associated with Vorkutlag, one of the most notorious forced-labour camps of the Gulag. Vorkutlag was established in 1932 with the start of mining. It was the largest of the Gulag camps in European Russia and served as the administrative centre for a large number of smaller camps and subcamps, among them Kotlas, Pechora, and Izhma (modern Sosnogorsk). The Vorkuta uprising, a major rebellion by the camp inmates, occurred in 1953.

In 1941, Vorkuta and the labour camp system based around it were connected to the rest of the world by a prisoner-built rail line linking Konosha, Kotlas, and the camps of Inta. Town status was granted to Vorkuta on November 26, 1943.

== Administrative and municipal status ==
Within the framework of administrative divisions, it is, together with eight urban-type settlements (Komsomolsky, Mulda, Oktyabrsky, Promyshlenny, Severny, Vorgashor, Yeletsky, and Zapolyarny) and seven rural localities, incorporated as the town of republic significance of Vorkuta—an administrative unit with the status equal to that of the districts. As a municipal division, the town of republic significance of Vorkuta is incorporated as Vorkuta Urban Okrug.

== Economy ==
By the early 21st century, many mines had closed as problems with the high costs of operation plagued the mine operators. Near the end of the 20th century there were labor actions in the area by miners; in the late '80s due to political changes, and during the 1990s by those who had not been paid for a year.

=== Transport ===
The town is served by Vorkuta Airport. During the Cold War, an Arctic Control Group forward staging base for strategic bombers was located at Vorkuta Sovetsky.

== Geography ==
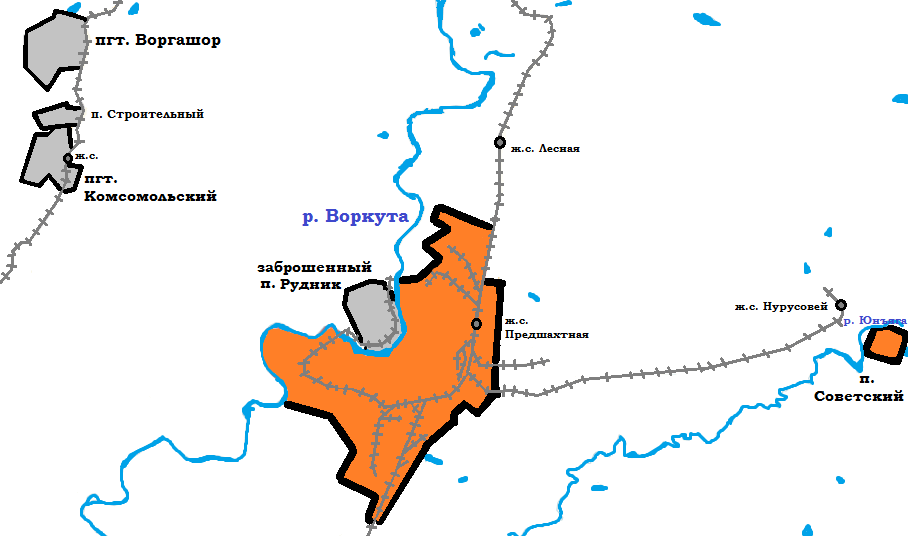
Vorkuta city on the map

Vorkuta is located in the Polar Urals (thus, the city is geographically located in Europe), on the Vorkuta River about 150 kilometers north of the Arctic Circle and only 180 kilometers from the coast of the Arctic Ocean. It is located in the permafrost zone. The distance by road (there is no permanent highway, therefore, including winter roads) to Syktyvkar, the capital of the Komi Republic, is 1,100 kilometres (680 mi).

It belongs to the regions of the Far North and is part of the land territories of the Arctic zone of the Russian Federation.

Vorkuta is located east of Yekaterinburg and Chelyabinsk, while Moscow time has been in effect in the city since October 26, 2014. UTC+3. Thus, the average solar noon in Vorkuta is at 10:44 a.m. (this is the earliest average solar noon in the world). This leads to the fact that, for example, on September 23 (the day of the autumnal equinox), sunrise occurs at 04:30 and sunset at 16:41, and also to the fact that twice a year the sun rises in Vorkuta in the evening (before 00:00) or sets in the morning (before 12:00).

=== Climate ===
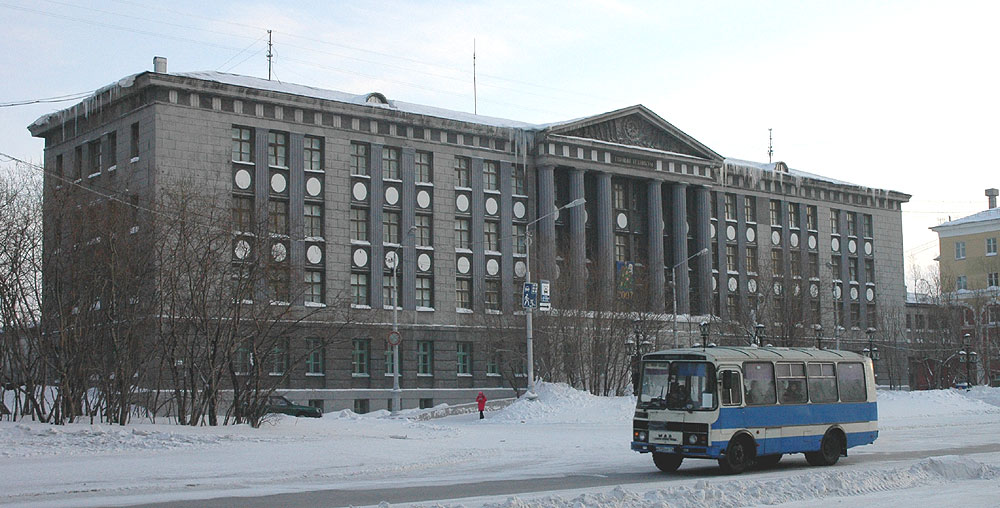
Mining College in Vorkuta

Vorkuta has a subarctic climate (Köppen Dfc) with short cool summers and very cold, long, and snowy winters. The average February temperature is about −20 °C (−4 °F), and in July it is about +13 °C (55 °F). Vorkuta's climate is influenced both by its distance from the North Atlantic and the proximity to the Arctic Ocean, bringing cold air in spring. This extends winters well into May and hinders the characteristic interior Russian summer warmth from reaching the city but for rare instances. In spite of this, Vorkuta has less severe winters than areas much further south in Siberia courtesy of the minor maritime moderation that reaches it. This also means that temperatures below −50 °C (−58 °F) have never been recorded in any winter month but December. During the winter, above-freezing temperatures are rare, but have occurred in all 12 months. With winters being humid, snowfall is much more common than in areas further east and a sizeable snow pack is built up each year. Due to the moderately warm summers, Vorkuta lies below the Arctic tree line.

The polar day in Vorkuta lasts from May 30 to July 14, the polar night lasts from December 17 to 27.

Climate data for Vorkuta
Month	Jan	Feb	Mar	Apr	May	Jun	Jul	Aug	Sep	Oct	Nov	Dec	Year
Record high °C (°F)	1.1 (34.0)	1.2 (34.2)	5.3 (41.5)	12.0 (53.6)	26.5 (79.7)	31.0 (87.8)	33.8 (92.8)	30.0 (86.0)	24.2 (75.6)	15.6 (60.1)	4.8 (40.6)	3.5 (38.3)	33.8 (92.8)
Mean daily maximum °C (°F)	−15.6 (3.9)	−16.1 (3.0)	−9.7 (14.5)	−5.5 (22.1)	1.7 (35.1)	12.6 (54.7)	18.6 (65.5)	14.2 (57.6)	7.9 (46.2)	−0.8 (30.6)	−9.9 (14.2)	−13.9 (7.0)	−1.4 (29.5)
Daily mean °C (°F)	−19.5 (−3.1)	−20.0 (−4.0)	−13.9 (7.0)	−10.0 (14.0)	−1.9 (28.6)	7.6 (45.7)	13.2 (55.8)	9.7 (49.5)	4.3 (39.7)	−3.4 (25.9)	−13.3 (8.1)	−17.6 (0.3)	−5.4 (22.3)
Mean daily minimum °C (°F)	−23.5 (−10.3)	−23.9 (−11.0)	−18.1 (−0.6)	−14.3 (6.3)	−5.2 (22.6)	3.3 (37.9)	8.2 (46.8)	5.8 (42.4)	1.2 (34.2)	−6.1 (21.0)	−16.8 (1.8)	−21.6 (−6.9)	−9.3 (15.3)
Record low °C (°F)	−48.0 (−54.4)	−49.4 (−56.9)	−43.1 (−45.6)	−38.5 (−37.3)	−25.3 (−13.5)	−8.4 (16.9)	−1.0 (30.2)	−4.8 (23.4)	−10.5 (13.1)	−29.0 (−20.2)	−45.1 (−49.2)	−52.0 (−61.6)	−52.0 (−61.6)
Average precipitation mm (inches)	36 (1.4)	34 (1.3)	33 (1.3)	27 (1.1)	35 (1.4)	52 (2.0)	55 (2.2)	63 (2.5)	57 (2.2)	57 (2.2)	40 (1.6)	42 (1.7)	531 (20.9)
Average snowfall cm (inches)	47 (19)	66 (26)	81 (32)	84 (33)	53 (21)	4 (1.6)	0 (0)	0 (0)	0 (0)	6 (2.4)	17 (6.7)	30 (12)	388 (153.7)
Average rainy days	1	0	1	3	9	16	19	22	19	10	2	1	103
Average snowy days	25	21	23	19	16	4	0	0	4	18	24	26	180
Average relative humidity (%)	81	80	81	79	79	72	74	82	85	88	84	82	81
Source: Pogoda.ru.net

=== Crumbling permafrost ===
Vorkuta lies on the edge of the continuous permafrost boundary in Russia, and scientists predict that continued warming could advance the border of continuous permafrost hundreds of miles northward, weakening the earth beneath the vast infrastructure built during the days of the Soviet Union's industrialization of the Arctic.

=== Natural monuments ===
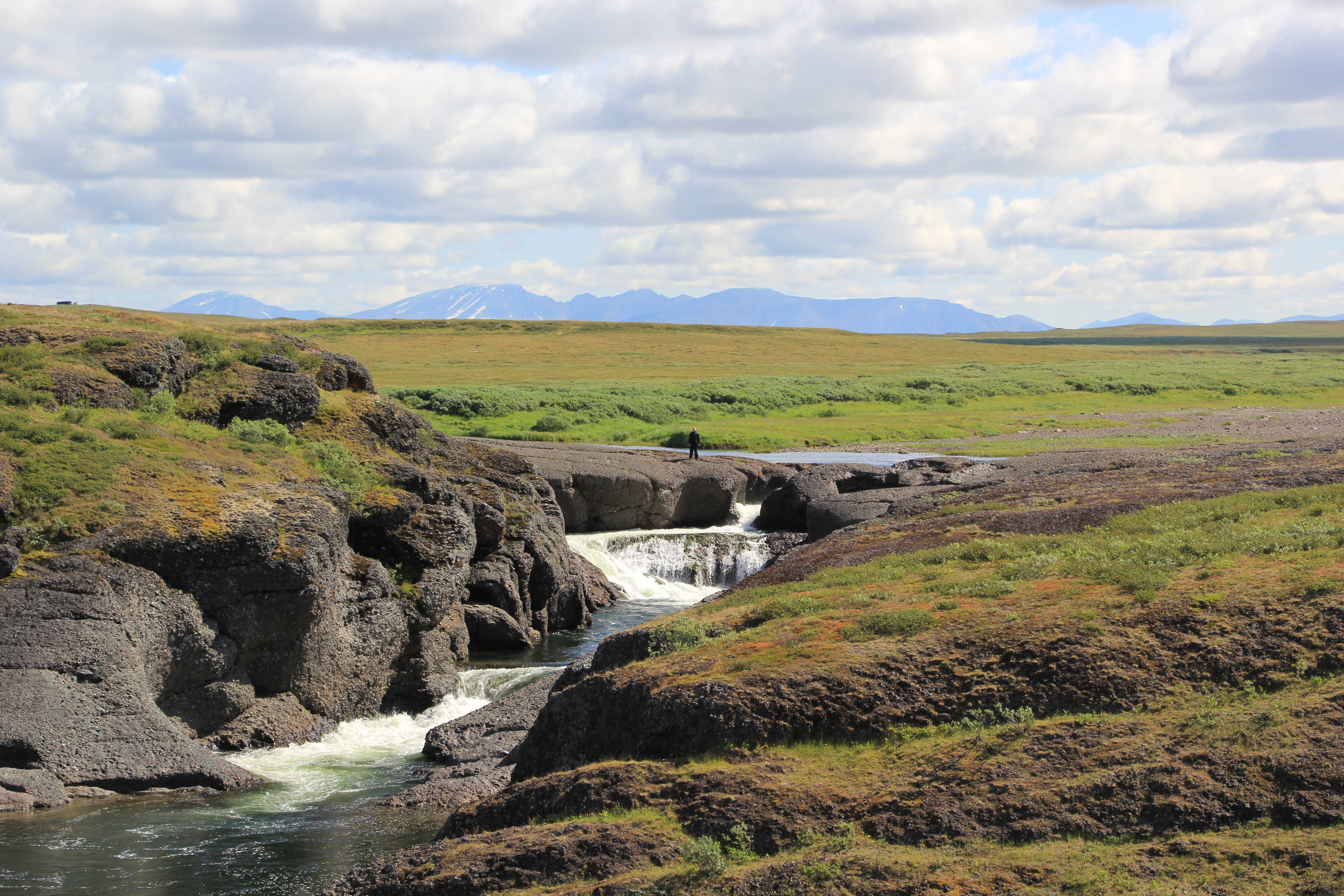
Halmer Yu River Waterfall

- Vorkuta Geological Monument, It is located on the territory of Vorkuta, on the right bank of the Vorkuta River above the TPP-1 dam. Rocky outcrops of Lower Permian rocks, up to 4 m high. The length is 400 m. The first coking coal outlets discovered by G. A. Chernov. Security regime — reserved.
- Mount Pemboy, geological monument of nature, elevation — 421 m.
- The complex reserve "Ridge", established in 1989, with an area of 4,000 hectares.
- Vorkuta Meadow Monument It includes seeded meadows in the "Dead End" and "Seventh Post" tracts of the Central State farm of the Vorkutaugol association. It was created by the Decree of the Council of Ministers of the Komi ASSR dated March 29, 1984. Long-term meadows in the "Dead End" tract were laid on two sites in 1958 and 1972 after the development of the Yernikov-moss tundra by sowing meadow bluegrass and meadow foxtail. The total area of the natural monument is 20 hectares. Security mode — customized.
- Halmer-Yu Waterfall on the Halmeryu River is one of the largest waterfalls in the European part of Russia, located 25 km north of the village of Halmer—Yu. The total height of the water drop is 10 m. A natural monument protected by the state.
- Buredan waterfall on the Kara River (Polar Urals). The waterfall is located 9 km below the mouth of the Nerusoveyakhi River in the center of a two-kilometer canyon.
- Marble Canyon on the Kara River.

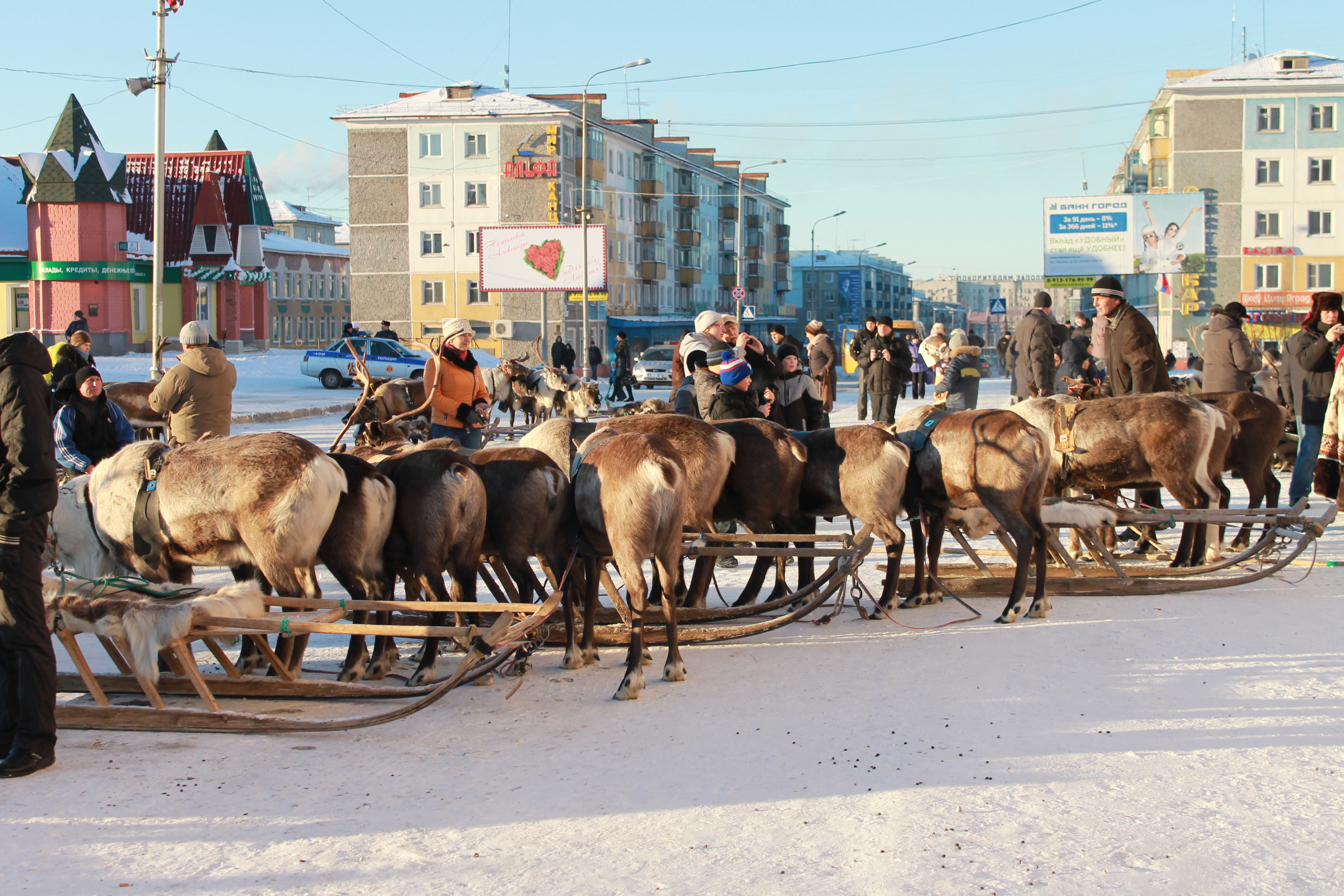
Vorkuta in 2012

== Demographics ==
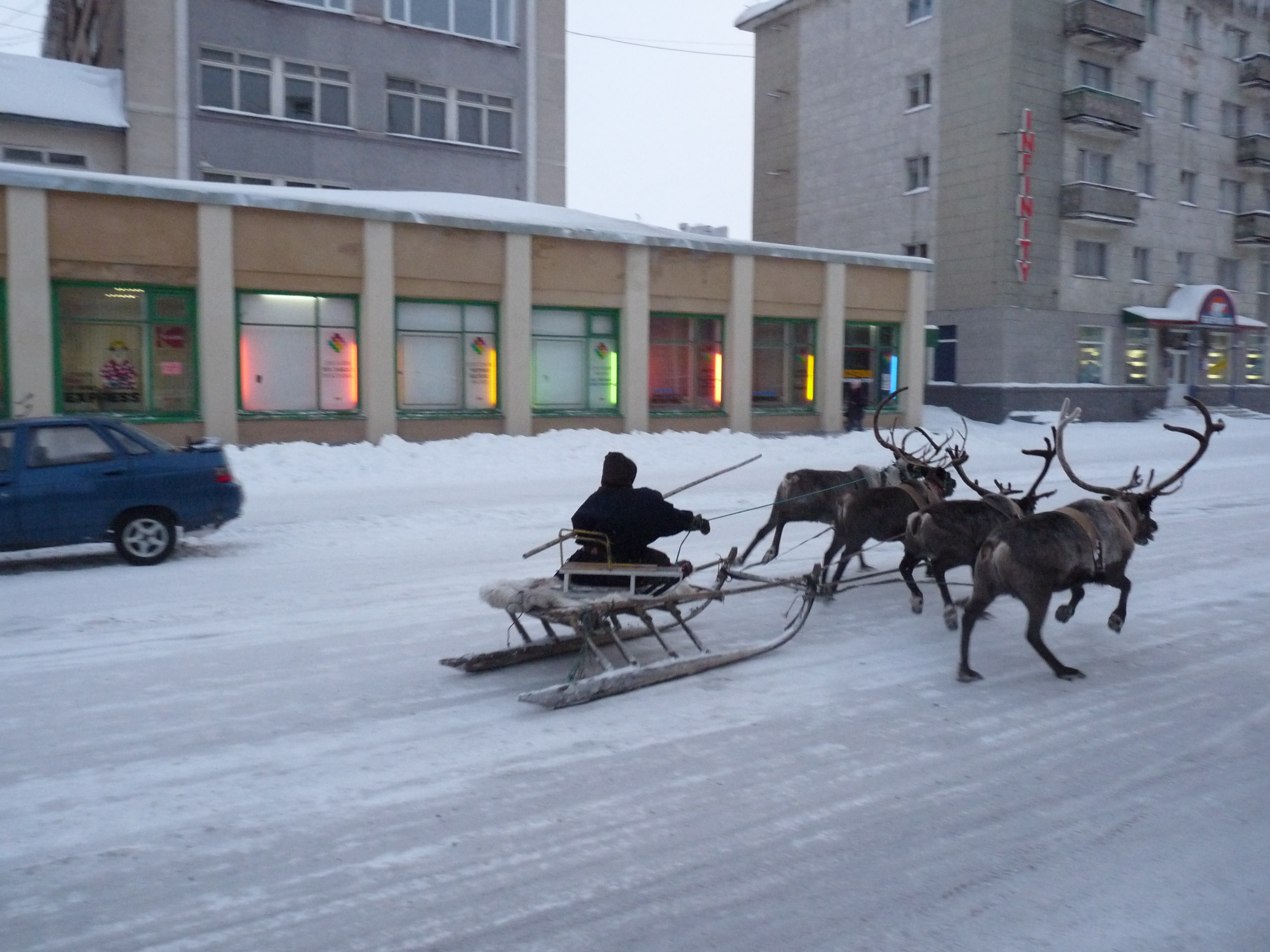
Reindeer are integral to the Nenets indigenous culture in the Vorkuta area

Historical population
Year	Pop.	±%
1943	7,000	—
1959	55,668	+695.3%
1970	89,742	+61.2%
1979	100,210	+11.7%
1989	115,646	+15.4%
2002	84,917	−26.6%
2010	70,548	−16.9%
2021	56,985	−19.2%
Source: Census data

After peaking at 115,000 in 1989, Vorkuta experienced a steady population decline, with many parts of the town abandoned. By 2021, the population had declined by 50% to 57,000.

As of the 2021 Census, the ethnic composition of Vorkuta was:

- Russians – 81.7%
- Ukrainians – 4.2%
- Kyrgyz – 2.4%
- Tatars – 1.7%
- Komi – 1.3%
- Azerbaijanis – 1.1%
- Others – 7.6%

According to the former head of the executive committee of the local branch of the United Russia party, Anton Glushkov, the city's population statistics are very different from the real state of affairs. According to him, "25,000 to 35,000 people" allegedly live in the municipality of the urban district of Vorkuta. The rest, in his opinion, are counted by registration but have already moved to the regions of Russia south of the Arctic Circle. One way or another, Vorkuta is the leading city in the Komi Republic and Russia in terms of population reduction.

== Notable people ==
- Pavel Kulizhnikov, multiple gold medalist in World and European championship speed skating, youngest speed skater to win and world record holder for fastest 500m speed
- Andrei Nikolishin, National Hockey League player
- Nikolay Punin, husband of poet Anna Akhmatova; art scholar, writer and editor of Russian magazine publications; co-founder of Department of Iconography in the State Russian Museum
- Bella Ratchinskaia, ballet choreographer

== In popular culture ==
In the 2010 video game by Activision, Call of Duty: Black Ops, the player character escapes from the labor camp in the town of Vorkuta in the game’s second mission. This gulag camp has been frequently featured in future Black Ops installments, as recently as of Black Ops 6.

In 2021, Moscow-based photographer Maria Passer photographed abandoned scenes in Vorkuta as part of a photography project that also included the villages of Cementozavodsky and Severny.

The 2025 video game Z.A.T.O. // I Love the World and Everything In It takes place in the fictional closed city of Vorkuta-5 during late 1986. Vorkuta-5 was inspired by the real-life urban-type settlement of Sovetsky, which became a part of Vorkuta in 2002.
