= Eisner (surname) =

Eisner (/ˈaɪznər/ EYEZ-nər, German: [ˈaɪsnɐ]) or Eissner is a surname. Notable people with the name include:

- Alexey Eisner (1905–1984), a Russian poet, translator and writer
- Ali Eisner (born 1973), a Canadian composer, director and photographer for children's television
- Bertold Eisner (1875–1956), Croatian law professor, pioneer of Croatian jurisprudence and writer
- Betty Grover Eisner (1915–2004), an American psychologist, pioneering researcher on LSD and psychedelic drugs
- Brian Eisner (born c. 1942), American tennis player and coach
- Breck Eisner, son of Michael Eisner and film director
- Bruce Eisner (1948–2013), pen name of Bruce Jay Ehrlich, American psychologist and author of the book Ecstasy: The MDMA Story
- Clara Eissner, see Clara Zetkin
- Curt Eisner (1890–1981), a German entomologist, specialised in snow butterflies
- David A. Eisner, British physiologist
- David Eisner (born 1958), Canadian actor
- Edward Eisner (1929–1987), Hungarian-born physicist
- Elliot W. Eisner, Professor of Art and Education at Stanford University
- Eric Eisner, son of Michael and film producer
- Eric Eisner (lawyer), former head of The Geffen Film Company
- Gilbert Eisner, American fencer
- Herbert Sigmund Eisner (1921–2011), British-German physicist and playwright
- Hubert Eisner (1897–date of death unknown), Austrian Nazi and became Kreisleiter of Voitsberg
- Ib Eisner (1925–2003), Danish artist
- Jacob Eisner (born 1947), Israeli basketball player
- Kurt Eisner (1867–1919), German-Jewish journalist, leader of the 1918 revolution in Bavaria
- Lotte H. Eisner (1896?–1983), German writer
- Maggie Eisner (1947–2022), British general practitioner
- Manuel Eisner, British academic and researcher on the history of interpersonal violence
- Mark Eisner, American prominent lawyer, tax expert, and politician
- Maria Eisner (1909–1991), Italian photographer
- Mary Eisner, American politician
- Michael Eisner, former head of The Walt Disney Company
- Pavel Eisner (or Paul Eisner; 1889–1958), Czech-German linguist and translator
- Philip Eisner, American screenwriter, author of the screenplay for the 1997 film Event Horizon
- Shiri Eisner, Israeli writer and activist
- Sigmund Eisner, Austrian entrepreneur
- Sigmund Eisner (academic) (1920–2012), American scholar of medieval literature
- Simon Eisner, Swedish philanthropist
- Sol Eisner, American soccer player
- Tanja Eisner (born 1980), Ukrainian and German mathematician
- Thomas Eisner, chemical ecologist and author of several books, including For the Love of Insects
- Will Eisner (1917–2005), comics artist and writer, best known as the creator of The Spirit
