= Georgy Chernov =

Russian geologist

George Chernov
- Георгий Чернов
- Born: April 21, 1906; Moscow, Russian Empire
- Died: April 6, 2009 (aged 102); Moscow, Russia
- Occupation: Geologist
- Title: Doctor

George A. Chernov (Russian: Георгий Александрович Чернов, romanized: Georgiy Alexandrovich Chernov; April 21, 1906 – April 6, 2009) was a Soviet geologist. He discovered the Vorkuta coal deposits and the petroleum district of the Bolshezemelskaya tundra, including the Usinskoe and Kharyaginskoye oil fields. Chernov discovered the piezoquartz deposits of the Vangyrskoe field during World War II, known in the Soviet Union as the Great Patriotic War. He obtained a doctorate in geological and mineralogical sciences from Moscow University and was the recipient of the Honored Geologist award of the RSFSR.

== Biography ==
Chernov was the son of Alexander Alexandrovich Chernov (1877–1963), a Russian geologist and paleontologist, and his mother, Eugenia P. Magnushevska. He had a sister named Olga. Chernov married Tamara Chernova and they had three children—one son (Vadim Georgievich Chernov) and two daughters (Tamara and Tatiana). Chernov later remarried twice, to Marina and then to Lyuba, and had a third daughter—Eugenia.

In 1930 Chernov graduated from the Geophysics Department (Faculty) of Physics and Mathematics of Moscow University. He was a member of the Moscow Society of Naturalists.

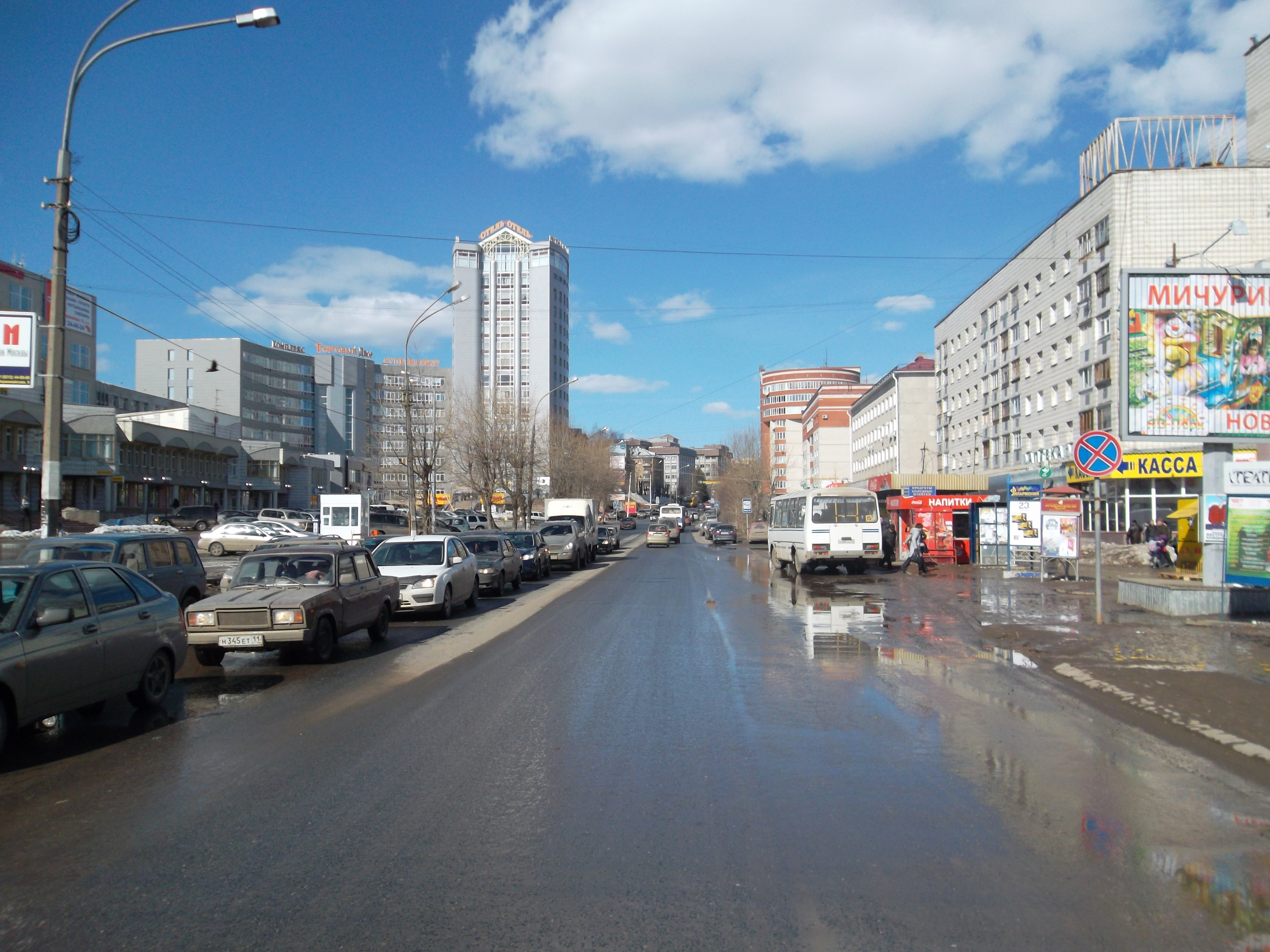
Syktyvkar

During the war years Georgy was evacuated to Syktyvkar to work from Arkhangelsk on the Northern Geological Survey. All forces of geologists were sent in search of raw materials needed for the front. In 1944 he conducted research on the Kozhim River, and later on the upper reaches of the Vangyr river. Here Chernov opened Vangyrskoe field, discovering piezoquartz, a valuable raw material for the electronic industry. Chernov received an award as discoverer of the deposit.

From 1957 to 1967, Chernov was a senior researcher at the Institute of Geology, Komi Branch of the USSR Academy of Sciences. In 1967 he retired and moved to Leningrad, where in 1968 he defended his doctoral thesis on "Paleozoic Bolshezemelskaya tundra and prospects of its oil and gas potential." Later, under the same title, he published his major monograph in the academic journal "Science".

== Achievements ==
Vorkuta gulag

In 1924, eighteen year old Georgy Chernov took part in an expedition led by his father, Alexander Alexandrovich Chernov, which inspired him to make geology his vocation. Almost every year thereafter, from 1924 to 1984, he traveled to different areas of the Nenets Autonomous Okrug and the Komi Republic. In the summer of 1930 Chernov found high-energy coal at the Vorkuta River. Coal mining has been carried out there since 1931. Where these coal reserves were discovered Vorkuta industrial community was founded (supporting Vorkuta gulag) and it later became a city. For transportation on the Pechora River a coal port was built, which later became the city of Naryan-Mar.

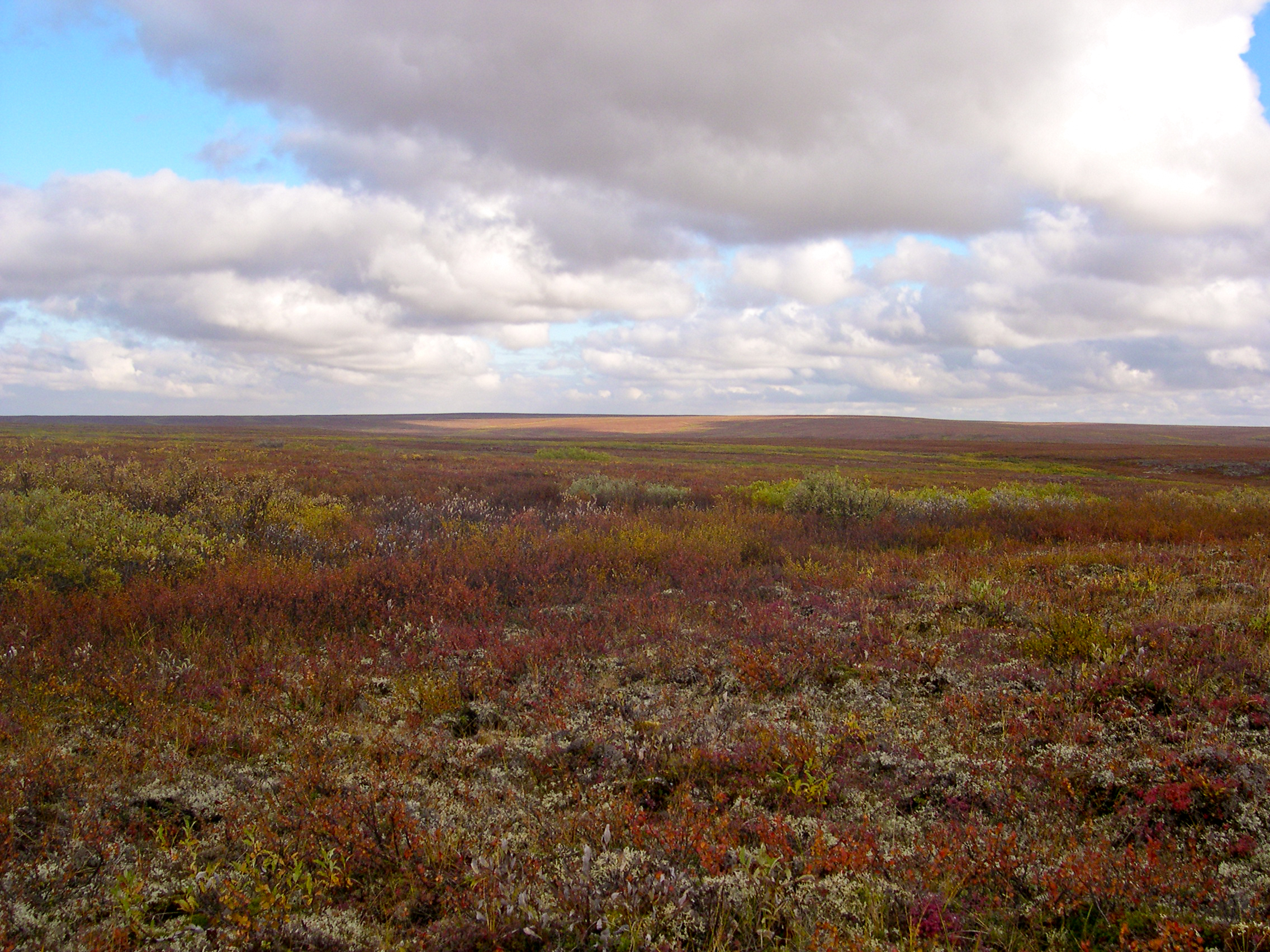
Tundra

In 1940 an expedition led by engineer-geologist G.A. Chernov traveled to the coast of Khaipudyrskaya Bay (Barents Sea) to carry out a detailed geological survey and review the available information on the oil-bearing Usinsk area. Thus began Chernov's long-time efforts to find oil in the Bolshezemelskaya tundra. Chernov described this period of his life as discovering gas in Naryan-Mar, and oil deposits in the area of Colva and Kharyaga, at the mouth of the Black River, and on the coast of the Barents Sea. In 1973, at one of the most promising deposits, trained geologists found the first oil, Usinsk field, near the city of Usinsk.

Chernov was also a talented popularizer of scientific knowledge. He wrote over 160 scientific papers, monographs and popular books on the history and archaeology of the Timan-Pechora Basin. He published many popular works, including "Tourist trips to the Pechora Alps", "Half a century in the Pechora area", and dozens of articles and essays on the history of geological research in the Komi region. Chernov also published articles on tourism and environmental protection.

== Honors ==
For the discovery of the Pechora coal basin Chernov was awarded a Title of honor, "The discoverer of the field." In 2007, Vladimir Putin signed a decree awarding Chernov the fourth degree Order "For Merit to the Fatherland". For participating in opening the Usinsk deposit in 1976 Chernov was awarded the second degree of the same Order and the sign "Pathfinder field". Georgy Chernov was awarded the medal "For Valiant Labor in the Great Patriotic War of 1941-1945", Order of the Red Banner of Labour (1946), the Medal "For Labour Valour" (1951), and the title Honored geologist of the RSFSR. G.A. Chernov has been designated an "Honorary Citizen of Vorkuta" and "Honorary Citizen of Usinsk"

Streets are named after Chernov in Ukhta, Naryan-Mar and Vorkuta.

School number 39 in Vorkuta is named after G.A. Chernov. and there is an annual conference held in his name.

Russian Medals

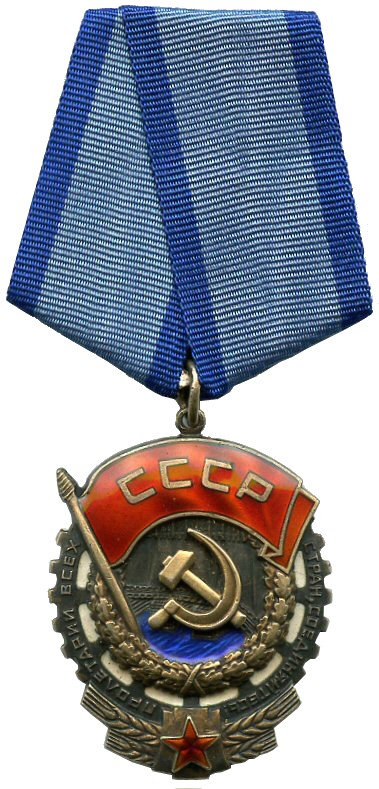
Red Banner of Labour

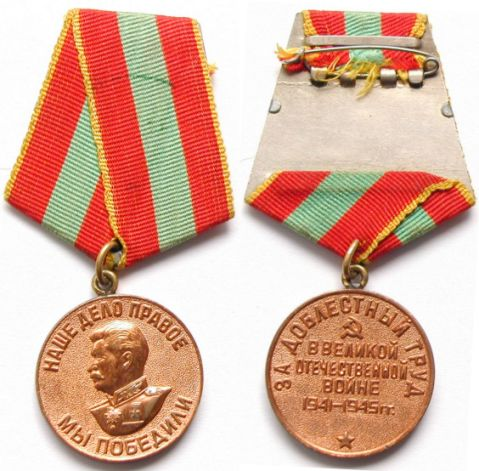
Great Patriotic War Labour

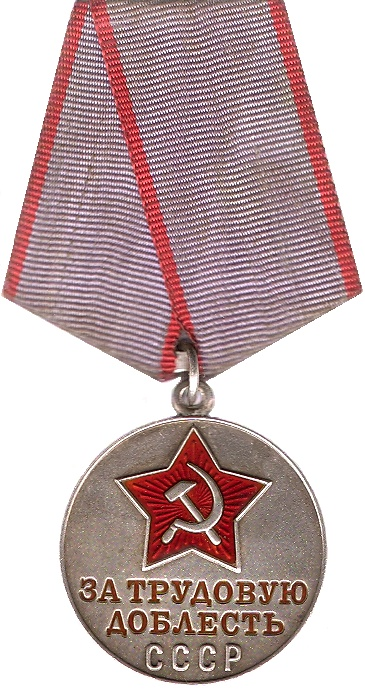
Medal for Labour Valour

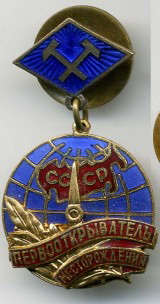
Discoverer

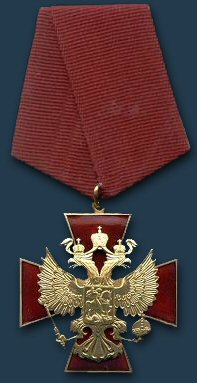
Order "For Services to the Fatherland" 4th degree

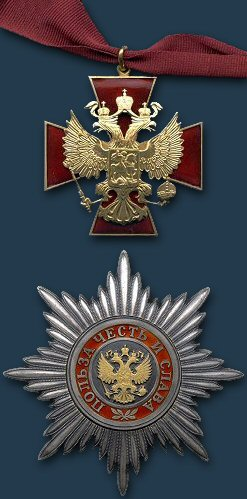
Order "For Services to the Fatherland" 2nd degree

G.A. Chernov medals
