= Elena Vladimirovna Markova =

Soviet Russian cyberneticist (1923–2023)

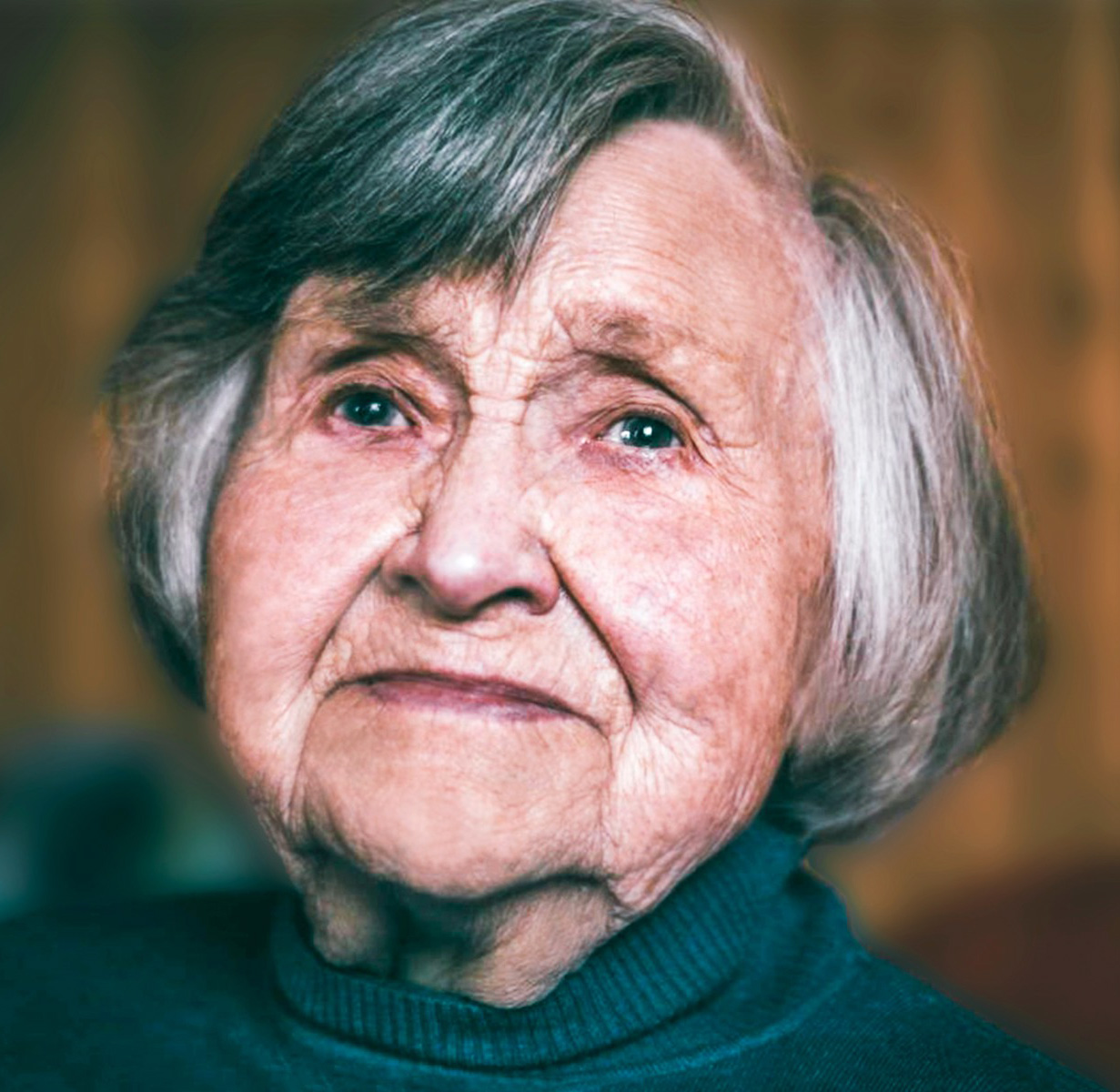
- Born: Elena Vladimirovna Ivanova; 24 April 1923; Kiev (now Ukraine)
- Died: 10 May 2023, in Moscow; Moscow, Russia
- Burial place: Domodedovo Cemetery
- Occupation: cyberneticist
- Known for: Memories from Gulag imprisonment
- Spouse: Alexey Alexeyevich Markov
- Children: 1

Elena Vladimirovna Markova (née Ivanova, 1923–2023) was a Soviet and Russian cyberneticist (Note: In Soviet Union, the term "cybernetics" meant computer science and engineering), Doctor of Technical Sciences, gulag convict and memoirist.

== Biography ==
Elena Vladimirovna Ivanova was born in Kiev (now in Ukraine) on 24 April 1923, In 1927 the family was exiled to the village of Grishino (now Pokrovsk). Her father, Vladimir Platonovich Ivanov, a teacher of Russian language and literature, was shot in 1937 as "an enemy of the people". Her mother, Vaclava Mikhailovna Ivanova (née Koribut-Dashkevich (Polish: Korybut-Daszkiewicz)), taught German language and mathematics and was detained in 1938 for a year and a half. In 1941 during World War II, Elena graduated from tenth grade and soon the village became occupied by advancing German troops putting many lives in danger. According to her later memoirs, 18-year-old Elena managed to save several dozen wounded soldiers of the Soviet Red Army by taking a job at the German-run labor exchange so she could supply wounded soldiers, hiding with local residents, with forged documents to save them from execution by Germans.

=== Convict ===
After the liberation of the city by Soviet troops, Elena was arrested and accused of treason for working at the labor exchange. In 1944, she was sentenced to 15 years of hard labor under Article 2 of Decree No. 39 of the Presidium of the Supreme Soviet of the USSR of 19 April 1943. She was sent to the gulag in Vorkuta in a cattle car to serve her sentence in the Vorkutlag prison camp (located in the very northern part of European Russia). In 1950, she was transferred to the Rechlag prison nearby. In 1951, the military board of the Supreme Court reduced her sentence to 10 years and, in November 1953, she was released after serving her sentence (with credit for working days).

From 1953 to 1960, she remained in the town of Vorkuta, married a fellow camp inmate, Aleksey Alekseyevich Markov, and graduated from the All-Union Correspondence Polytechnic Institute. In 1960, she was fully rehabilitated (released from exile with the removal of her criminal record).

She had a daughter in 1957. In 1959, her husband was also fully rehabilitated, which allowed the young family to move to Moscow. In 1961–1981, she worked at the Scientific Council for Cybernetics of the USSR Academy of Sciences together with Aksel Berg and Vasily Nalimov, about whom she left written memories. She earned her doctorate in 1971 with a thesis titled: Theory and application of combinatorial plans in identification and optimization problems.

From 1982 to 1992, she worked as a researcher at the Research Institute of Automation of Management in the Non-Industrial Sphere (VNIINS), and then she became a chief specialist at the Russian Certification Center of the Gosstandart government agency.

=== Theater advocate ===
While she lived in Vorkuta, she and her actor husband were active in the Vorkuta State Drama Theatre, named after B. A. Mordvinov in 2019. Many years later she met Nadezhda Morvinova, the granddaughter of the theater's founding director, and introduced her to current theater officials for the first time preserving the theater's history.

Elena Vladimirovna Markova died on 10 May 2023, in Moscow. She was buried at the Domodedovo Cemetery.

== Selected works ==
She published 15 monographs, including Experimental Planning under Heterogeneity Conditions (1973, together with A. N. Lisenkov), Combinatorial Plans in Problems of Multifactorial Experiments (1979, together with A. N. Lisenkov), Randomization and Statistical Inference (1986, together with A. A. Maslak). She also authored several memoirs about camp reality such as, Vorkuta Notes of Convict "E-105" and From the Mine to the Stage. Camp Theater in Vorkuta: History of the Vorkuta Musical and Drama Theater.
