= Homer Harold Cox =

American military policeman (1921–1954)

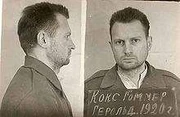
- Born: 1921; Oklahoma City, Oklahoma, U.S.
- Died: September 27, 1954 (aged 32–33); Lawton, Oklahoma, U.S.
- Resting place: Resthaven Gardens Cemetery, Oklahoma City, Oklahoma, US
- Other names: Homer H. Cox, Homer Cox, "Our Jimmy"
- Occupation: Military Policeman

Homer Harold Cox (1921-1954) was an American military policeman. He served in the 759th Military Police Service Battalion in the Military Police Corps in West Berlin. On 6 September 1949, he was drugged and kidnapped while off duty, in the Soviet occupation zone of Germany in East Berlin. He was imprisoned at various Soviet Gulag prison camps including the Vorkutlag and Rechlag camps in Vorkutlag Mine No. 4 and Vorkuta Mine No. 7.

== Early life ==
Homer Harold Cox was born in Oklahoma City, Oklahoma, United States, in 1921 (although a 1940 census lists him as born in 1923).

== Military police ==
Cox was a policeman in the Military Police Corps who served during and after World War II as a guard and MP in West Berlin in the US Occupation Zone, West Germany.

=== Kidnapping and Vorkutlag ===
On 6 September 1949, while Cox was in a cafe in West Berlin he blacked out while drinking coffee and was drugged by Soviet agents. He was kidnapped and taken to an East Berlin police station where he woke up the next morning. He spent the next 32 months in East Berlin's Lichtenberg Prison. His captors accused him of working as an intelligence agent. Cox said in an interview that they interrogated him "eight, ten, twelve hours daily . . . They beat and starved me. They stripped me and put handcuffs on me and strapped my legs to the chair . . . They would beat me until I passed out, then throw ice water on me". Cox was taken to the Soviet Union where he was convicted and sentenced to 53 years in the Gulag for "espionage, sabotage and subversion". He was soon sighted at the Sverdlov camp No. 6118 in Scherbakov (Rybinsk) and Vorkutlag camps No. 4 and 7.

While in Vorkuta Cox was put on a diet of two bowls of water and cabbage soup a day. He lost 63 pounds. He said in an interview that "Every day someone died". Cox witnessed the Vorkuta uprising of 1953. He recalled that when the prisoners of Vorkutlag rioted, guards sent machine-gun fire into the crowd. While in the camp Cox met several other American and European prisoners. The one that interested him most was an Austrian girl named Inge Brenner, who was released in October 1953. Cox and Inge contacted each other after he was released and they became engaged.

=== Release and death ===
Cox was released by the Soviets due to an amnesty on 29 December 1953 along with US Merchant Mariner Leland Towers. He seemed to be fine and showed no signs of being mental or physical damaged. Cox was carried as AWOL during his captivity. On January 21, 1954, a board of inquiry determined that private Cox could not be held accountable for his absence. Homer Harold Cox died on 27 September 1954 in Lawton, Oklahoma. He died due to pneumonia. Shortly after his death his fiancée made a statement to the press that Cox was in good health and "murder is the only explanation". This led to a theory that Cox was assassinated by KGB agents.

Cox was buried in Resthaven Gardens Cemetery in Oklahoma City.

== See also ==
- Americans in the Gulag
- Vorkutlag
- Gulag
