= Johannes Hiob =

Johannes Hiob may refer to:

- Johannes Hiob (composer)
- Johannes Hiob (politician)
