= No Surrender =

No Surrender may refer to:

== Politics ==
- No Surrender (to the IRA), a political chant since used by England football fans
- "No Surrender!", a British Unionist slogan originating from Siege of Derry now used in Northern Ireland, Scotland, and England

== Books ==
- No Surrender (novel), a 1942 thriller novel by Martha Albrand
- No Surrender, 1911 novel by suffragette Constance Maud
- No Surrender: My Thirty-Year War, an autobiography by World War II Japanese holdout Hiroo Onoda

== Film and TV ==
- No Surrender (1985 film), a comedy starring Michael Angelis
- No Surrender (2018 film), an Egyptian action film
- No Surrender, a 2002 short film by Richard James Allen

== Music ==
- "No Surrender" (Bruce Springsteen song), 1984
- "No Surrender" (Taproot song), 2012
- "No Surrender", an Ulster pipe tune AKA "The Crimson Banner"
- "No Surrender", a 1943 song composed by Eisler for Hangmen Also Die!
- "No Surrender", a 1994 song by Bone Thugs-n-Harmony, from Creepin on ah Come Up

== Other uses ==
- No Surrender (gang), a gang in the Netherlands, founded 2013
- TNA No Surrender, a professional wrestling pay-per-view event

== See also ==
- No Surrender... No Retreat (album), a 1998 album by Bushwick Bill
- "No Surrender, No Retreat" (Babylon 5), a 1997 episode of Babylon 5
- No Retreat, No Surrender, a 1986 martial arts film
- No Retreat, No Surrender: One American's Fight, a 2007 book by Tom DeLay and Stephen Mansfield
- Van Morrison: No Surrender, a 2005 biography on Van Morrison by Johnny Rogan
- Never Surrender (disambiguation)
