= Eisner =

Eisner or Eissner may refer to:

- Eisner (surname), including a list of people with the name
- Eisner Loboa (born 1987), Colombian-born Mexican footballer
- USS Eisner, several United States Navy ships
- Eisner Peak, Graham Land, Antarctica
- Eisner Award, annual awards for achievement in comics
- Eisner Food Stores, a chain of supermarkets in Illinois and Indiana from 1901 to 1981

== See also ==
- William F. Eisner Museum of Advertising & Design, a museum in Milwaukee, Wisconsin
