= Jānis Mendriks =

Latvian Catholic priest & servant of God (1907–1953)

Servant of God Jānis Mendriks MIC
- Born: 21 January 1907; Logocki, Kalupe, Latvia
- Died: 1 August 1953 (aged 46); Vorkutlag, Komi ASSR, Soviet Union
- Cause of death: Gunshot wounds

Jānis Mendriks (21 January 1907 – 1 August 1953) was a Latvian Catholic priest who was killed in a Soviet Gulag during the 1953 Vorkuta uprising.

== Biography ==
Mendriks was born in Logocki, Kalupe Parish, in southern Latgale (then in Russian Empire). He attended Riga Seminary (Rīgas Katoļu garīgais seminārs) after which he was ordained a priest at St. James's Cathedral, Riga on 3 April 1938. He was a member of the Congregation of Marian Fathers. After his ordination, he served as a vicar at the Marian parish in Viļāni.

In 1942, during the German occupation of Latvia, while he served a parish in Ostron, a German policeman died. He knew the man to be impenitent, and denied him burial in hallowed ground. This refusal required him to hide from German occupation authorities.

After the Soviet re-occupation of Latvia in 1944, he resumed parish work. He was arrested on 25 October 1950 and sent to prison in Riga. On 24 March 1951, he was sentenced to 10 years of forced labor for "organizing anti-Soviet nationalist gangs and for anti-Soviet propaganda." He was deported to the Komi Autonomous Republic and worked at coal mine no. 10 in Yurshor, camp department no. 10 of Rechlag in the Arctic Circle. Mendriks secretly fulfilled his priestly duties in the labour camp.

=== Death ===
On 19 July 1953, inmates at Vorkuta, who were forced to work in the region's coal mines, went on strike during the Vorkuta uprising. The mostly passive strike was put down on 1 August, when Soviet Army troops were ordered by the Vorkuta Gulag camp chief Derevyanko to fire at the strikers, resulting in the death of at least 53 prisoners. While the workers of Vorkuta were protesting and rioting, Mendriks decided to move to the front row of the prisoners, believing that as a priest he should be where the people were dying to prepare them to meet God. Mendriks started reciting the formula of absolution: "Misereatur vestri Omnipotens Deus" in the front row and was shot dead by a Soviet Army soldier.

Mendriks has been honoured by the Roman Catholic Church as a Servant of God since 2003.

== Sources ==
- Biography from the Website of the Marianists
