= Vorkuta State Drama Theatre =

The Vorkuta State Drama Theatre (Russian: Воркутинский государственный драматический театр) is located in the Russian city Vorkuta. It was opened in 1943 in the Gulag.

Between the years 1930 and 1953, many Soviet citizens were arrested by the NKVD. Most of the prisoners of the Gulag camps were arrested for political reasons, according to Article 58 (RSFSR Penal Code). One of the largest camps was Vorkutlag, a major Gulag labor camp. It was a place for political prisoners. Among them were many musicians, artists, painters, singers. This is the camp commander, Colonel of the NKVD Maltsev (Михаил Митрофанович Мальцев), who ordered first to organize a theater. The first chief director of the theater was a prisoner Boris Mordvinov (ru: Мордвинов, Борис Аркадьевич), former director of the Bolshoi Theatre, and professor of the Moscow Conservatory (he was convicted as a spy).

The theater opened on August 8, 1943 and placed in a wooden club at camp. Prisoners and guards played at the one scene.

Among the famous prisoners were: an operatic singer Boris Deyneka (ru: Дейнека, Борис Степанович), an operatic singer Theodor Routkovsky (Т. И. Рутковский), a singer, poet and literary translator Tatiana Lechtchenko (ru: Лещенко-Сухомлина, Татьяна Ивановна), an actress Valentina Tokarskaya (ru: Токарская, Валентина Георгиевна), a playwright and screenwriter Aleksei Kapler, a composer Vladimir Mikosho (Владимир Владимирович Микошо), an actor Boris Kozin (Борис Козин), an actress V. Pyaskovskaya (В.Пясковская), an artist Peter Bendel (Пётр Эмильевич Бендель) (de: Peter Emiljewitsch Bendel), a young singer Valentina Ishchenko (Валентина Мефодьевна Ищенко), a choreographer A. Dubin-Belov (А. М. Дубин-Белов), a violinist A. Biukhart (А. Бюхарт), etc. By 1948 the troupe had about 150 people.

After Joseph Stalin’s death the camp was reorganized and the theater entered the city system. It was built a new theater building. Now it is a drama theater of Vorkuta.
