= Armand Maloumian =

Armand Maloumian (4 May 1928 – 24 June 2007 was a French Gulag prisoner in the Soviet Union and writer.

== Life ==
Maloumian was born in Marseille, France, in 1928 into a family of Armenians who fled the Armenian genocide in the Ottoman Empire. In 1944 he lied about his age and joined the French forces.

In 1947 he moved with his family to Soviet Armenia, where his father, a specialist in athletic traumatology, was offered a medical professorship. However, the family soon wanted to return to France, a move the Soviet authorities refused. Maloumian was arrested in Moscow in 1948, accused of being a French spy, was convicted under Article 58 of the Soviet penal code and was imprisoned in Rechlag labor camp of the Gulag. The Soviet authorities allowed his family to return to France in 1954, after Stalin's death.

However, Maloumian was not freed until 1956, when he too was allowed to return home.

After his return, Maloumian wrote his memoirs of his imprisonment, Les fils du Goulag, published in French in 1976 and translated into a number of languages.

During his imprisonment he was held for a time with the Russian writer Yury Dombrovsky. He recalled events from their imprisonment in a tribute published after Dombrovsky's death.

== Bibliography ==
- Maloumian, Armand (1976). Les fils du Goulag [The Sons of the Gulag]. Paris: Presses de la Cité. ISBN 2258000882.
- Maloumian, Armand (1982) [1979]. "And Even Our Tears" (PDF). Kontinent 4: Contemporary Russian Writers. Translated by Van Der Rhoer, Edward. New York, NY 1982: Avon Books – via Scribd. "About Yuri Dombrovsky - Originally published in Kontinent No. XX, 1979 (reprinted in 1982) [Gulag - Soviet Union]"
