= Bolshezemelskaya Tundra =

Hilly lowland in northwestern Russia

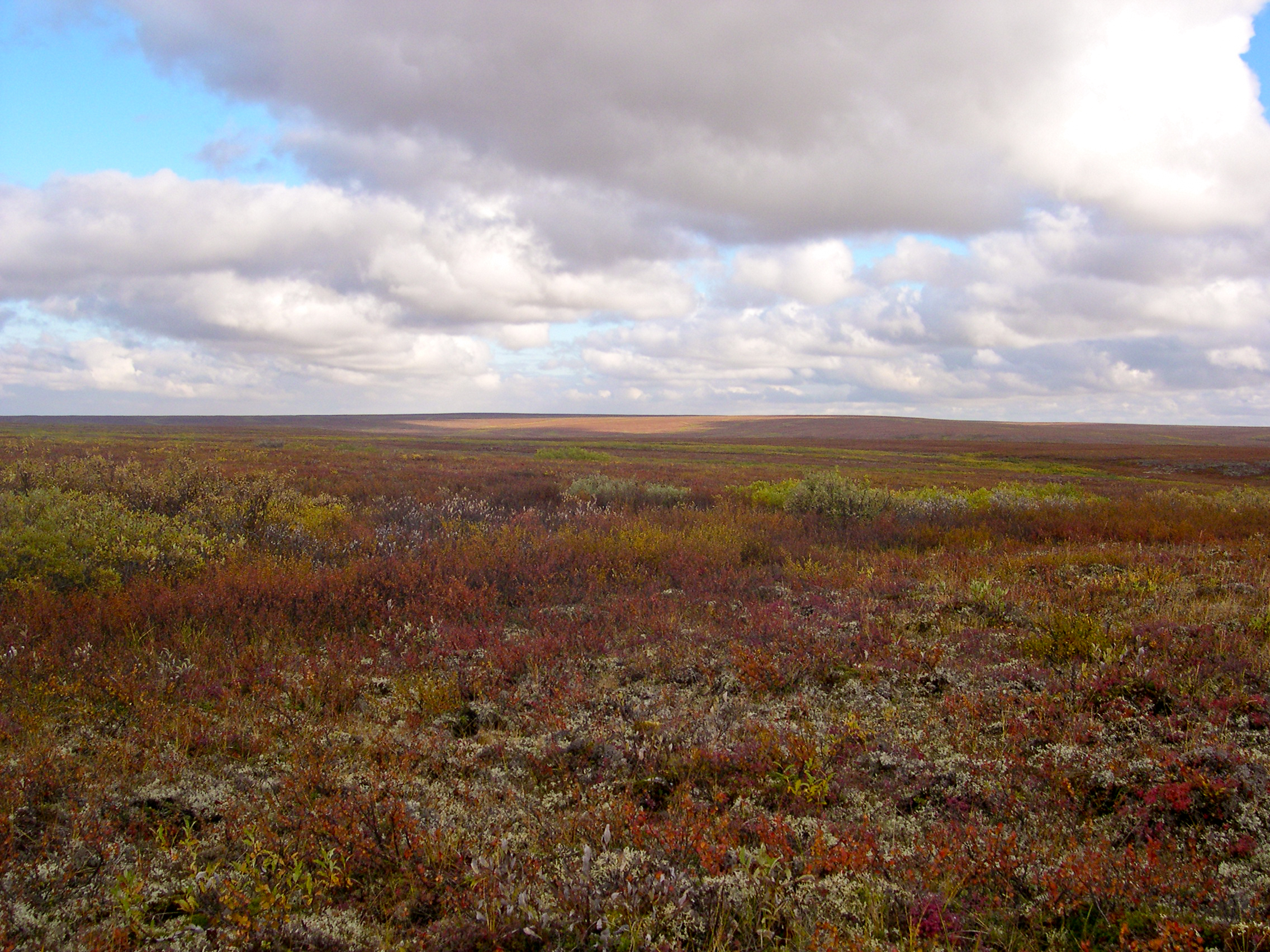
The landscape of the Bolshezemelskaya Tundra

Bolshezemelskaya Tundra (Russian: Большеземельская тундра) is a hilly lowland in the Timan-Pechora Basin in northwestern Russia on the coast of the Barents Sea, between the Pechora and Usa rivers and the Pay-Khoy Range of the Ural Mountains. It covers more than 100,000 km^{2} (39,000 sq mi)

It is situated within the territory of the Nenets Autonomous Okrug and the Komi Republic. It rises to an average height of 100–150 metres (330–490 ft) above sea level, the highest parts reaching 200–250 metres (660–820 ft) above sea level. The topography of the Bolshezemelskaya Tundra is dominated by hills and moraine ridges composed of sandy till. The tundra lies in the subarctic climate zone. Winters are long and cold, with the average January temperature in the northwest at −16 °C (3 °F), −20 °C (−4 °F) in the south-east, while the summers are short and cool, with the average temperatures in July being around 8 to 12 °C (46 to 54 °F). Frosts also occur in the summer months.

In the southern part, the total annual precipitation is about 450 mm (18 in), while in the northern part it is about 250 mm (10 in). The Bolshezemelskaya Tundra has a dense river network, which consists mainly of the tributaries of the Pechora and the Usa rivers. There are many lakes in the upper sections of the main rivers. Much of the lowland is covered with permafrost. The plant cover is tundra, mainly mosses and prostrate shrubs. The southern part of the lowland is a forest-tundra. South of the Arctic Circle, taiga predominates. The native population of Izhma Komi is engaged in reindeer herding. Part of the Bolshezemelskaya Tundra area is part of the Pechora Coal Basin, and there exist large deposits of crude oil and natural gas discovered by the geologist Georgy Chernov.
