= Eisler =

Eisler is a Jewish surname of German origin. Notable people with the surname include:

- Barry Eisler, American novelist
- Brenda Eisler, Canadian long jumper
- Georg Eisler, Austrian painter
- Gerhart Eisler, German journalist and politician
- Hanns Eisler, Austrian composer
- Jerzy Eisler, Polish historian
- Kim Isaac Eisler, American author
- Lloyd Eisler, Canadian figure skater
- Otto Eisler (1893-1968), Czech architect
- Peter Eisler, American investigative journalist
- Paul Eisler, Austrian engineer
- Riane Eisler, American sociologist
- Robert Eisler, Austrian Jewish art historian and Biblical scholar

== See also ==
- Edmund Eysler
- Eisner
