= North Russian Plain =

Geographical area

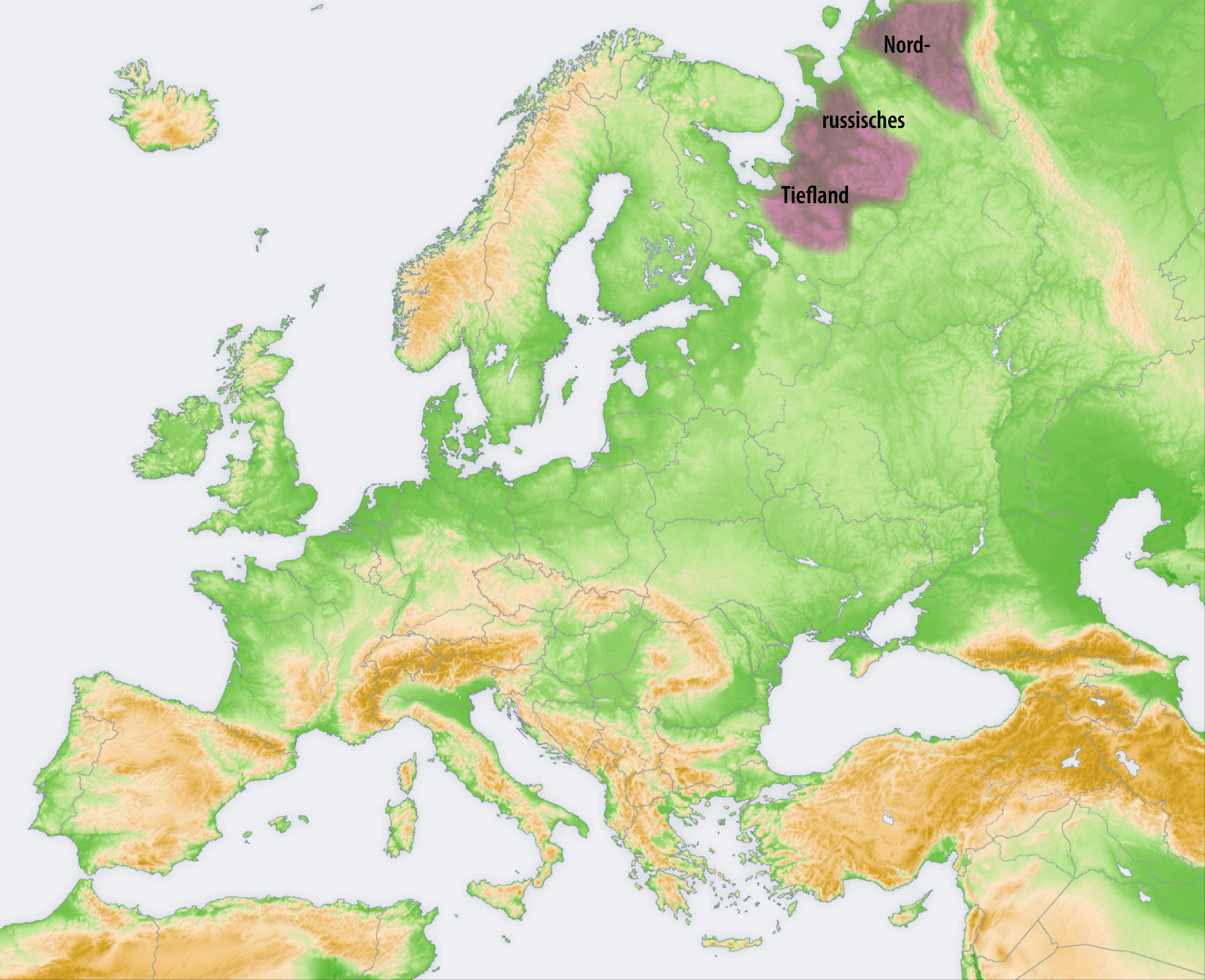
Map showing the location of the plain

North Russian Plain (Russian: Северо-русская низменность) is a plain, occupying the geographical north and north-east of the Russian Plain. Timan Ridge, which is a series of low (350–400-metre [1,150–1,310 ft]), smoothed and badly damaged ridges separates North Russian plain in the two sectors—Pechora Plain to the east and the Northern Dvina lowland in the west, which roughly correspond to the basins of the two largest rivers in the region, which are the Northern Dvina River and Pechora River. From the north lowland washed the White Sea and the Barents Sea. The coastline is indented, swampy places. Allocated Kanin peninsula, a lowland island Kolguev. Particularly noteworthy biomes such as the delta of the Northern Dvina and Pechora delta. Lowlands in the east limit Pai-Khoi and the Northern Urals.

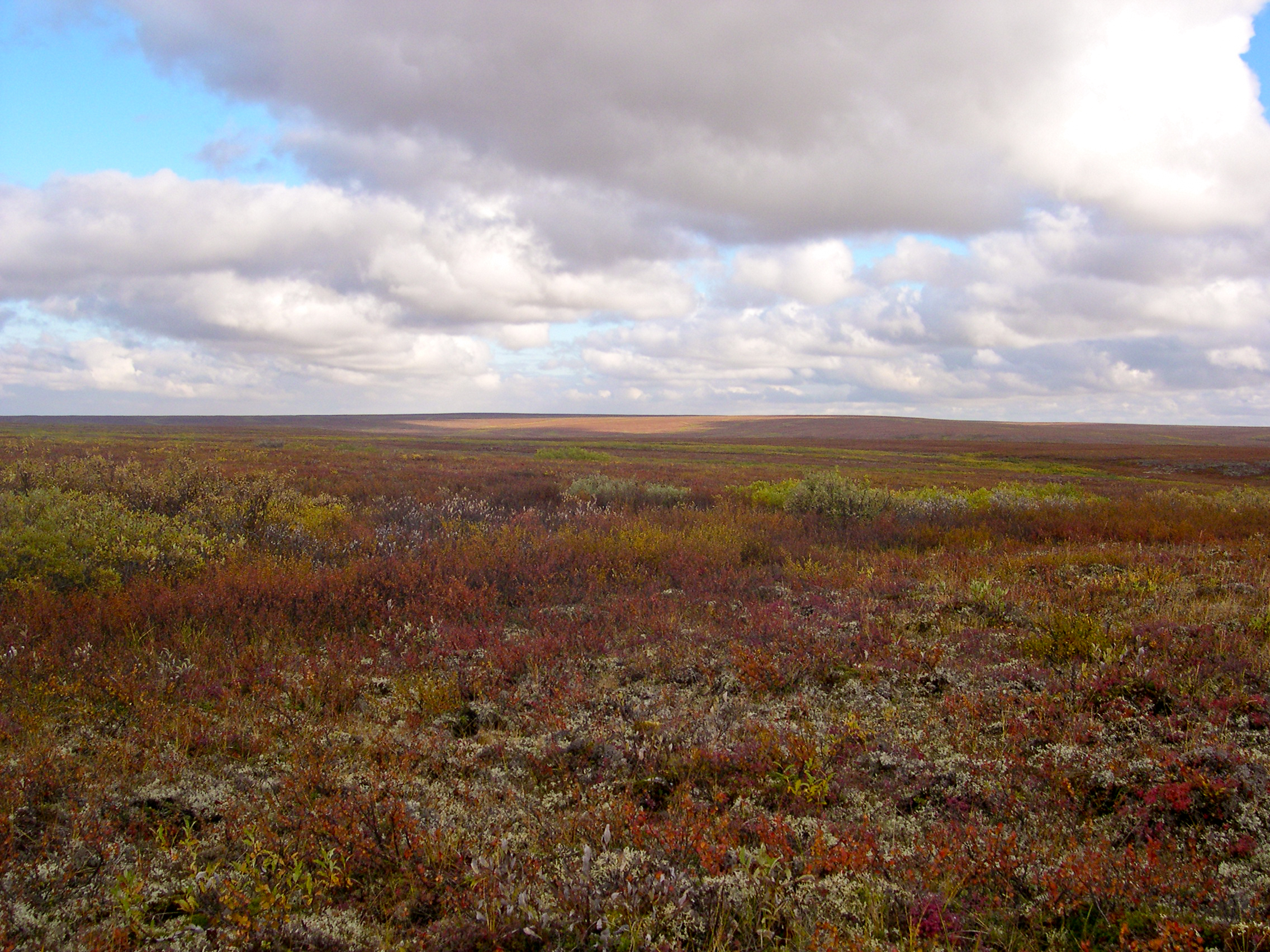
North Russian Plain near Vorkuta

Soil which dominates the northern and north-western is slope of the earth's surface, whereby Russian North Plains was named North slope. This effect on the local hydrography. This also explains the slight warming of soil in the summer. The south of the region is dominated by boreal forest and northern vegetation poorer. Here lie the Malozemelskaya Tundra and Bolshezemelskaya Tundra.
