= Memoirs about Vorkutlag =

A number of notable inmates of Vorkutlag forced labor camp wrote accounts about their experiences.

== John H. Noble ==
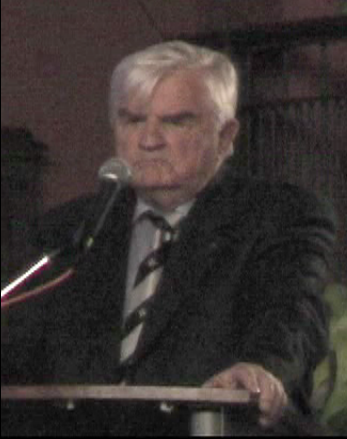
John H. Noble giving a speech in Nossen, Germany in July 2007.

In the 1930s the Noble family, a family of German Americans living in Detroit, returned to Dresden, Germany to start operating a camera factory. During World War II, the Noble family tried to leave Germany but were denied by the Gestapo. After the war, the factory was taken over by the East German government. John H. Noble and his father Charles A. Noble were arrested by the Stasi to keep them from protesting the takeover, Noble was never charged with any crime but was still sent to the Gulag system.

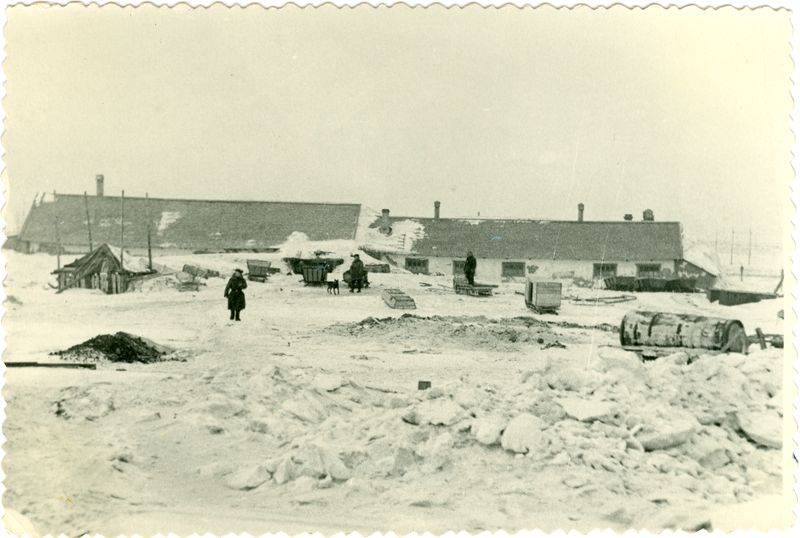
Vorkuta barracks for the deportees during the winter, circa 1947.

== Edward Buca ==
Edward Buca was a soldier in the Polish Home Army, the Polish underground resistance movement in German-occupied Poland, Buca was arrested with a group of other soldiers for alleged treason to the Soviet Union. He spent thirteen years in the Gulag working in Vorkuta.

== Joseph Scholmer ==
Joseph Scholmer was a doctor working for the Central Health Authority in Berlin during World War II. He studied medicine at the University of Bonn. After the end of the Second World War, Schölmerich lived in the Soviet occupation zone of Germany (SBZ) and joined the Communist Party of Germany (KPD). Scholmer was accused of being an agent of the Gestapo and of the American and British Secret Services in May 1949, In April 1949, Schölmerich was arrested by the Ministry of State Security (Soviet Union) (MGB) in East Berlin for his opposition to Stalinism and imprisoned in its central pre-trial detention centre. He spent the years from 1949 to 1953 in the Gulag camp at Vorkuta.

== Alla Tumanova ==
Alla Tumanova was twenty years old when she was arrested in 1951, Tumanova was a student at Lenin State Pedagogical Institute, Tumanova was charged with membership in an anti-Soviet youth group. During the arrests of the anti-Soviet youth group members, Of the seventeen students who were arrested, three were executed while the rest were sent to the Gulags. Tumanova was sentenced to twenty-five years of hard labor in the Gulag, which she spent in the Abez Invalid Camp and Vorkuta Gulag.

== Günter Albrecht ==
Günter Albrecht was a German student sailor in the Kriegsmarine who was captured as a Prisoner of war by the British in 1944. After he was released back to Germany in Stralsund he joined the Liberal Democratic Party of Germany (LDP), the FDGB and the FDJ in 1946 in hopes of exerting liberal influence, he was arrested by the Soviets in 1949 for his liberal activities and was sent to Vorkuta in 1950.

== Konstantin Waleryanovich Flug ==
Konstantin Waleryanovich Flug was a student at Baumann University of Technology, he was arrested in 1932 possibly because he wrote an essay about "terror" which came into the possession of the Joint State Political Directorate (OGPU) through a friend. Konstantin was convicted in 1933 by a remote judgment according to Articles 58–8, 10 and 11 by a special court of the OGPU to ten years of warehouse detention in an improvement labor camp. After being transported to two unknown camps in Siberia and the Ukhta Gulag Konstantin was taken to Vorkuta in 1936 where he would remain until 1946. Konstantin wrote about the first known strike in Vorkuta which was organized by Trotskyist prisoners.

== Horst Hennig ==
Horst Hennig was one of the many prisoners that participated in the Vorkuta Gulag uprising. Hennig was a student in the Martin Luther University of Halle-Wittenberg (university of Halle) studying medicine. In 1950 Hennig was arrested by the Stasi and convicted by a Soviet military tribunal in Halle to 25 years of forced labor. Hennig was transported to Vorkuta immediately after, he spent five years in Vorkuta during which he took part in the uprising of 1953 and wrote a letter and prisoner demands to the Soviet authorities that were negotiating with the prisoners in the uprising.

== Albertine Hönig ==
Albertine Hönig was a public school teacher in Transylvania, Romania during World War II, in 1944 she started providing escape assistance to the German soldiers after Romania was occupied and joined the Soviet Union's side. Hönig was Arrested by the Romanian secret police in 1945 and handed over to the Soviet authorities. She was convicted of organized resistance against the Soviet Union and was sentenced to 8 years in the Gulag system. Hönig was transported to Vorkuta after and served her sentence until 1953, after her release she was exiled to Vorkuta where she would stay until 1959 when she was departed to West Germany.

== Erwin Jöris ==
Erwin Jöris was a youth member of the Communist Party of Germany (KPD) who was arrested by the Gestapo in 1933 for communist activities in Fascist controlled Germany, he was sent to the Sonnenburg concentration camp (current day Brandenburg). Jöris was discharged from the concentration camp in late 1933 and on behalf of the party emigrated to Moscow, there he had a disillusionment and break with the communist worldview. Because of the break with his communist views he was arrested in 1937 by the NKVD and was sent to the Lubyanka, Jöris was sent back to Germany a year later and conscripted to the Wehrmacht in 1940, he was captured by the Red Army in 1941 and sent back to the Soviet Union as a Prisoner of war. After Jöris was sent back to East Berlin he was arrested once more and convicted by a Soviet military tribunal to 25 years of forced labor and Punishment as a political prisoner in Vorkuta, shafts 9 and 10. Jöris was released in 1955 and wrote about his time in the camp.

== Johannes Krikowski ==
Johannes Krikowski was a student living in Greifswald, in 1949 he started being openly critical of the political development in the GDR. He continued being critical of the government and the politics of East Germany and in 1951 he was arrested by the Stasi and put in a pre-trial detention in the Greifswald prison, a few days later Krikowski was handed over to the Soviet organs and transported to Schwerin. Krikowski was put in Solitary confinement, soon after he was accused of alleged espionage for the French secret service. Krikowski had a trial against several people, of whom he only knew one and was sentenced to 25 years in the Gulags, Three of the co-defendants in the trial were sentenced to death. In 1952 he was transported to Berlin and then to the Soviet Union where he would be taken to Vorkuta, Krikowski worked in the coal shaft, later (for health reasons) he was given another job.

== Eduard Lindhammer ==
Eduard Lindhammer was a youth member of the Liberal Democratic Party of Germany, he was arrested in 1950 in Schwerin while in a class in high school. Lindhammer was convicted and according to Art. 58–10, para. 2 and 58–11, para. 2 StGB of the Russian Soviet Federative Socialist Republic sentenced him to 25 years in storage, he was soon after transported to Vhuta in the Soviet Union via Brest, Belarus. After being transported to Orsha and Gorky, Russia he was taken to Vorkuta and spent 4 years in the camp.

== Leonid-Torwald Alwianowitsch Mjutel ==
Leonid Mjutel was a Red Army conscript who was released from military service for health reasons, he worked as a mechanic in the “Avantgarde” plant after being released from service. Mjutel's father, Alwian Mjutel, was arrested in 1937 and soon in the following years Mjutel's mother and his two brothers were accused of sharing an apartment and income with an enemy of the people (the father). Within a three-day period, the three were banished from Leningrad and the surrounding area. Mjutel was convicted by a special committee at the NKVD according to the so-called letter paragraph ASA (anti-Soviet agitation) he and his brothers were sentenced to five years in camp. Mjutel first worked as a logger in the Krasnoyarsk area in 1939 and then he was transported to Vorkuta in 1940. Mjutel worked on the Pechora railway between Ukhta and Koschwa, he was imprisoned in Vorkuta for a total of 8 years and wasn't released until 1946 because of the War, later he was kept in the camp "until further notice".
