= Rechlag =

Rechlag also known as Special Camp no.6, Osoblag no. 6 (Russian: Речлаг, Особый лагерь № 6, Особлаг № 6) was a Gulag special labor camp headquartered in Vorkuta, Komi ASSR. It was established on August 27, 1948, from camp departments (лагерное отделение) of Vorkutlag and disestablished on May 26, 1954, by joining back into Vorkutlag.

It is particularly known for Vorkuta uprising.

== Notable inmates ==
- Horst Bienek, German novelist and poet
- Homer Harold Cox, American military policeman, kidnapped while off duty, in the Soviet occupation zone of Germany in East Berlin.
- Anatoly Gurevich, Soviet intelligence GRU officer
- Pietro Leoni, Italian priest of the Society of Jesus and the Russian Greek Catholic Church. His memoir of surviving the Gulag, Spio dei Vaticano!, was published after his return to the West.
- Armand Maloumian, Frenchman of Armenian descent, author of the memoir Les fils du Goulag
- Elena Vladimirovna Markova, Soviet and Russian cyberneticist
- Jānis Mendriks, Latvian Catholic priest
- Nadezhda Ulanovskaya, Soviet intelligence GRU officer, translator, and English teacher, arrested for treason, specifically for the transfer of information about the Great Purge for Australian Godfrey Blunden for the 1947 book A Room on the Route published in the US.
- ru:Робс, Мартиньш, Latvian engineer
- ru:Хорол, Иосиф Михайлович, Soviet dissident, member of the Zionist movement in Soviet Union
- ru:Игнатавичус, Стасис, Lithuanina engineer, one of the leaders of the Vorkuta uprising
- ru:Колесников, Виктор Демьянович Soviet Air force officer, and MGB officer, one of the leaders of the Vorkuta uprisin
- ru:Маркова, Елена Владимировна, Soviet computer scientist, convicted of cooperation with Germans during World War II, rehabilitated in 1960
- ru:Цэцулеску, Александр Иванович, Romanian physician
- ru:Доброштан, Игорь Михайлович, Soviet engineer
- ru:Мехтиев, Борис Мехтиевич, Soviet Azerbaijani military commander
- ru:Фиттерман, Борис Михайлович, Soviet engineer, automobile designer
- ru:Кендзерский, Феликс Феликсович, Polish engineer topographer, Polish Armed Forces commander, one of the leaders of the Vorkuta uprising
- ru:Буц, Эдвард Антонович, Polish Home Army member, one of the leaders of the Vorkuta uprising
- ru:Дерман, Генриетта Карловна, Latvian library scientist
- ru:Рождественский, Михаил Васильевич, protoiereus in the Soviet union, member of the church dissident Josephite movement
- ru:Самутин, Леонид Александрович, geologist, Vlasovite, one of the leaders of the Vorkuta uprising
