= Pechora Plain =

Plain located in the North Russia Plain

Pechora Plain (Russian: Печорская низменность) is a plain in the North Russian Plain which is located in the north-east of the European part of Russia, located in the basin of the Pechora River, between the Urals and Timan Ridge (the Komi Republic and Nenets Autonomous Okrug).

On the territory of the Pechora Plain plains alternate folded fluvioglacial sands and lacustrine clays and much swampy and hilly ridge portions folded moraines and sand and gravel deposits. A large number of lakes. The most important rivers are the Pechora and its tributaries Izhma and the USA. Strip along the coast up to 30 km developed marine terraces. The climate is temperate continental, subarctic in the north. In the north is dominated by tundra (Bolshezemelsky, Malozemelskaya, and Timan tundra), in the south—the coniferous forests, watersheds, and swamps. There are deposits of coal, oil.

== See also ==
- Meshchera Lowlands
