= Never Surrender =

Never Surrender may refer to:

== Albums ==
- Never Surrender (album) or the title song, by Triumph, 1982
- Never Surrender, or the title song, by Blitz, 2005
- Never Surrender, by Darker Half, 2014

== Songs ==
- "Never Surrender" (2 Unlimited song), 1998
- "Never Surrender" (Corey Hart song), 1985
- "Never Surrender", by Combichrist from Making Monsters
- "Never Surrender", by DJ Khaled from Suffering from Success
- "Never Surrender", by Don Felder from Airborne
- "Never Surrender", by Nana Mizuki
- "Never Surrender", by Saxon from Denim and Leather
- "Never Surrender", by Skillet from Awake
- "Never Surrender", by Stan Bush

== Other uses ==
- Never Surrender (film), a 2009 film about mixed martial arts
- Never Surrender (novel), a 2004 novel by Michael Dobbs
- Never Surrender: A Galaxy Quest Documentary, a 2019 documentary about the film Galaxy Quest
- Never Surrender, an American band featuring John Porcelly
- Never Surrender High-Top, a sneaker brand sold by Donald J. Trump

== See also ==
- "We shall never surrender", a quotation from Winston Churchill's We shall fight on the beaches speech
- No Surrender (disambiguation)
