= Simon Eisner =

Chief city planner for Los Angeles

Simon Eisner (ca. 1907–1999) was chief city planner for Los Angeles, California, between 1943 and 1949 and was designated a National Planning Pioneer by the American Planning Association in 1991.

Eisner was born in Bayonne, New Jersey, and in 1920 moved to California, where he attended Lincoln High School (Los Angeles) and UCLA. He graduated with a degree in architecture from the University of California, Berkeley.

Between 1937 and 1943, Eisner worked for the Los Angeles County Regional Planning Commission, then was chief city planning architect for the City of Los Angeles between 1943 and 1949. He co-authored the 1943 Los Angeles Plan for Freeways.

He began his own consulting firm in 1950 and completed plans for cities throughout California, including Beverly Hills, Burbank, San Luis Obispo, and Santa Barbara, and cities in the San Gabriel Valley and Riverside and San Bernardino counties.

From 1946 to 1964, Eisner taught at the University of Southern California and then was director of the Urban Innovations Group at UCLA.

He was the author of a textbook, The Urban Pattern, with Arthur B. Gallion.

Eisner had a Distinguished Service Award from the American Institute of Certified Planners, for which he had been nominated as a Fellow.

He died on October 28, 1999, at the age of 92, and was survived by his wife, Isabel, and two sons, Stan and Richard and grandchildren Marc, Alexandra and Nicholas
