= Maggie Eisner =

British general practitioner

- Born: Margaret Claire Eisner; 27 June 1947; Cardiff, Wales
- Died: 18 December 2022 (aged 75); Bradford, West Yorkshire, England
- Education: Somerville College, Oxford
- Occupation: General practitioner
- Years active: 1972–2007

Margaret Claire Eisner (27 June 1947 – 18 December 2022) was a British general practitioner. She became a qualified doctor in 1972 and joined her first GP practice in Lewisham in 1975. In 1978, Eisner moved to the North of England and became the leader of the practice in Shipley, Bradford, Yorkshire. She helped to establish Bradford's home births service, founded a teenage health clinic to marginalised and vulnerable groups and was a Training Programme Director of the Bradford Specialist Training Scheme for General Practice. Eisner was a fellow of the Royal College of General Practitioners.

== Biography ==
Eisner was born on 27 June 1947 in Cardiff, Wales. She was the only child of the Jewish parents, Gisela, a Czech doctor and the Romanian lawyer Conrad. The couple fled Adolf Hitler's regime in Czechoslovakia in 1939 and settled in South Wales. While Eisner was at school, her father often worked abroad. The family moved to Essex in 1954 and her mother was appointed assistant medical officer for Essex County Council as Maggie was educated at St Paul's Girls' School in London after earning a scholarship. Eisner was awarded a Senior Scholar to read medicine at Somerville College, Oxford, graduating in 1972.

In 1972, she qualified as a doctor and joined her first GP practice in Lewisham in 1975. It was called Lime Groves Practice and Eisner was part of a radical collective in which all staff took home exactly the same rate of pay regardless of their position, running as a collective on feminist and socialist ideas. She spent three years there before moving to the North of England and took over the practice in Shipley, Bradford, Yorkshire. Eisner setup Bradford's home births service with the assistance of midwives. She was a Training Programme Director of the Bradford Specialist Training Scheme for General Practice, focusing on communication skills and the creative arts in life and medicine. She was the founder of a teenage health clinic operated by nurses and it provided more accessible health care to vulnerable and marginalised groups. Eisner ran regular courses to address each international students special training requirements and was a contributor to the 1986 book Feminist Practice in Women’s Health Care. She also worked at the Pellin Therapy Centre, where she helped those with emotional and social problems.

She retired in 2007 but remained involved with Bradford's GP training scheme until 2015. Eisner volunteered for Freedom from Torture for ayslum seekers subjected to torture and was the author of a medico-legal guide for the charity's staff and volunteers. She helped to found the Bradford Friendship Choir, a singing choir for refugees and asylum seekers, and Bloomin’ Buds Theatre Company, which set out to get working-class children interested in the stage. Eisner supported Bradford's asylum support network BIASAN. She performed in the Bradford's Women's Singers and the Bradford Festival Choir Society, the latter of which she served as chair. She gardened at Lauriston Community Farm close to Edinburgh every year.

== Personal life ==
Eisner married the primary school teacher Stephen Horsman in 1986. They adopted a child. She was diagnosed with a glioblastoma in January 2019. Eisner died of glioblastoma at her home in Bradford on 18 December 2022. She had a private burial service at Thornton Cemetery followed by a humanist service. A commemoration service was held for her at Somerville College Chapel on 8 June 2024.

== Awards ==
She was awarded a fellowship of the Royal College of General Practitioners to acknowledge her work in medicine. Eisner received the Paul Freeling Award in 2010.
