= Usinskoye oil field =

Russian oil field

Usinskoye Oil Field
- Location within Komi Republic Location within Russia
- Country: Russia
- Region: Komi Republic
- Offshore/onshore: onshore
- Coordinates: 66.17722°N 57.35389°E
- Operator: Lukoil

Field history
- Discovery: 1977
- Start of production: 2011

Production
- Estimated oil in place: 57.7 million tonnes (~ 68×10^{6} m^{3} or 430 million bbl)

The Usinskoye Oil Field is an oil field located in Komi Republic of Russia. It was discovered in 1977 and developed by Lukoil. The oil field is operated and owned by Lukoil. The total proven reserves of the Usinskoye oil field are around 430 million barrels (57.7 million tonnes), and production is centered on 10,000 barrels per day (1,600 m^{3}/d).

== See also ==
- Petroleum industry in Russia
