= Alexey Eisner =

Soviet poet, translator, and writer

Alexey Eisner (Russian: Алексе́й Влади́мирович Э́йснер, IPA: [ɐlʲɪkˈsʲej vlɐˈdʲimʲɪrəvʲɪtɕ ˈejsʲnʲɪr]; 5 October 1905, in St. Petersburg – 30 November 1984, in Moscow), was a Soviet poet, translator and writer.

== Biography ==
After the October Revolution of 1917, his stepfather brought the young Eisner to the Princes' Islands. Thus began a life in exile. Eisner graduated from the Grand Duke Constantine Constantinovich Russian Cadets Corps in Sarajevo.

He remained in Europe where he made a living washing windows and working at construction sites. He started writing poetry and met with many famous Russian émigrés such as Georgy Adamovich, Marina Tsvetaeva and her husband Sergei Efron.

His poem "Looming Autumn, Yellow Bushes ..." was published in 1932 and became a textbook and was very popular in literary émigré circles. The line "Man begins with grief ..." from this poem is often cited.

Eisner joined the literary association of Russian émigrés in Prague. In the late 1920s, he sought to return to the Soviet Union and in 1934 he joined the "Homecoming Union".

In 1936, he joined the XII International Brigade which fought on the side of the Republicans during the Spanish Civil War. He was an adjutant to Máté Zalka, the Hungarian writer who served as a general under the name of Lukács (General Lukács). At the end of the Civil War, he reportedly ran into Ernest Hemingway who wrote him a blank cheque that Hemingway ensured him he could draw upon should he choose to visit Hemingway in the United States.

Eisner returned to the Soviet Union in January 1940 without cashing the cheque. Four months later, his was searched by the secret police, who found the blank cheque signed by Ernest Hemingway. He was arrested and sentenced under Article 58 of the Criminal Code of the USSR to 8 years of hard labour in the Vorkutlag camp. After completion of this period he was sent for "perpetual exile" to the Karaganda region in Kazakhstan.

In 1956 he was rehabilitated and was permitted to return to Moscow where he was active as a translator and journalist. He wrote several books and published memoirs on General Lukács, Haji Mamsurov (who fought in Spain under the name of Colonel Xanthi), Ilya Ehrenburg and Ernest Hemingway.

== Works ==
=== Poems ===
- A person begins with sorrow: poems in different years / Comp. and Afterword. E. Witkowski. – M.: Aquarius Publishers, 2005. – 72. (Little Silver Age.)
- Idem. 2 nd ed., Corr. – M.: Aquarius Publishers, 2005.
- In anthology: "Skeet." Prague 1922–1940: An Anthology. Biography. Documents / join. Art., gen. Ed. LN Beloshevskii; status., Biographies LN Beloshevskii, VP Nechaev. – Moscow: Russian Way, 2006. – 768.
- In anthology: Poets of Prague "Skete. Poetical works / Comp., Jg. Art., comments. OM Malevich. – SPb, OOO "Publishing" Rostock "," 2005. – 544. (Unknown 20th century.)

=== Collections ===
- My Sister Bulgaria. Essays. – Moscow: Soviet Writer, 1963. – 215.
- A person with three names. The story of Mate Zalka. – M.: Politizdat, 1986. – 335. (Ardent revolutionaries)
- The Twelfth International. Stories. – Moscow: Soviet Writer, 1990. – 640.
