= USS Eisner =

USS Eisner may refer to more than one United States Navy ship:

- USS Eisner (DE-269), a destroyer escort transferred to the United Kingdom upon completion which served in the Royal Navy as the frigate HMS Domett (K473) from 1943 to 1946
- USS Eisner (DE-28), a name assigned briefly to the destroyer escort USS Emery (DE-28) during her construction
- USS Eisner (DE-192), a destroyer escort in commission from 1944 to 1946
