= Ib Eisner =

Danish artist

Ib Eisner (19 May 1925 in Copenhagen, Denmark – 7 April 2003 in Frederiksberg, Denmark) was a Danish artist.

His artistic career started in 1945 with entering the Copenhagen Academy of Arts, where he studied in the classes of the Professors Kræsten Iversen (1886–1955), Olaf Rude (1886–1957) and Axel Jørgensen (1890–1963).

In the early fifties he discovered characteristic motif cycles, which were to influence all of his work. From then on he mostly devoted himself to painting scenes from his immediate surroundings, which he transferred directly onto canvas on site. Eisner showed particular interest in the long-established Danish forest park "Dyrehaven", which offered the painter a wide repertoire of motifs for years. He also was interested in motifs of the popular amusement parks "Tivoli" and "Bakken" as well as in scenes from his personal surroundings in Frederiksberg and views of the island of Bornholm. Other pictographic themes which were constant factors in Eisner's paintings are still life and the Danish traditional "Sankt Hans Fire".

Ib Eisner worked mostly in picture series to explore the nuances of changes of lighting moods and seasons. French Impressionist theme and composition techniques are noticeable not only in his preferred method of operation, the plein-air painting, which from this point on the artist applied in all weather conditions, but also in the treatment and application of colour. These alternate between the fluent, almost sketchy application of colour with thinned oil paints and a paste-like, relieflike flow, deliberately trying to reveal the artistic facture. Eisner applied pure, mostly unmixed colours next to each other in quick brushstrokes, creating a vibrant structure of bright tones and developing an original picture-intrinsic dynamic. He painted mostly without fixed contour lines or preparatory drawings, since the capturing of elusive lighting effects required swift work. With these painting tools, the artist created a unique atmosphere characteristic to each picture.

Ib Eisner's works were purchased by art associations for the promotion of fine arts as well as banks and companies in Denmark, Norway and Sweden and by private collectors. His international recognition is evident through the sale of his paintings to Germany, Sweden, Japan, Great Britain and the United States.

== Literature ==
Weilbach - Dansk Kunstnerleksikon, ed. Philip Weilbach, Bd. 2, Copenhagen, 1994

Saur - Allgemeines Künstlerlexikon, vol. 33, München 2002

Stefanie Hegyaljai, The painted Oeuvre of the Danish Artist Ib Eisner / Das malerische Werk des dänischen Künstlers Ib Eisner, ed. von DRICON Managing Consultants AG, Frankfurt am Main 2006
