= Johannes Hiob (composer) =

Estonian composer and organist

Johannes Hiob (17 May 1907 Türi Parish – 7 August 1942 Vorkuta prison camp, Russia) was an Estonian composer, organist, and choral conductor.

Born in Lokuta village, he was a graduate of Tallinn Conservatory. His approach to composition was influenced by the work of Rudolph Tobias.

In 1941 he was mobilized by the Soviet Army to the Arkhangelsk Oblast, and subsequently was imprisoned in the Vorkutlag, where he died in 1942.

== Works ==
- 1931 cantate "Jesaja kuulutamine"
- 1935 cantate "Lunastav Issand"
- 1935 cantate "Jõulukantaat"
- 1937 oratorium "Suitsev Siinai"
- 1939 opera "Võidu hind"
