= Yurshor =

Yurshor Юршор
- Urban-type settlement

Other transcription(s)
  - Komi: Юршор
- Interactive map of Yurshor
- Location of Yurshor Yurshor (Komi Republic)
- Coordinates: 67°36′37″N 63°59′58″E
- Country: Russia
- Federal subject: Komi Republic
- Urban-type settlement administrative territorySelsoviet: Vorgashor Urban-Type Settlement Administrative Territory
- Founded: 1944

Population (2010 Census)
  - Total: 0
  - Estimate (2010): 0 )
  - Rank: 0 in 2021

Administrative status
  - Subordinated to: town of republic significance of Vorkuta
  - Capital of: Vorgashor Urban-Type Settlement Administrative Territory

Municipal status
  - Urban okrug: Vorkuta Urban Okrug
- Time zone: UTC+3 (MSK)
- Postal code: 169930
- OKTMO ID: 87710000126

Yushor population
- 2010 Census: 0
- 2002 Census: N/A
- 1989 Census: N/A
- 1979 Census: N/A

Yurshor (Komi and Russian: Юршор) was a northern outpost of Vorgashor, a mining town in Russia, and part of the Vorkuta Ring of settlements. By 2018 the town had been abandoned.

It is suggested that the village's name originates from the abbreviation of the name of the river Izyurvozh, a tributary of the Vorkuta river. The full name of the river, "Izyurvozhshor", can be translated from the Komi language as "stream-tributary at the stone-head."

There is a monument to the Lithuanian victims of the shooting during the Vorkuta uprising at Mine 29 "Yurshor". The monument is the bronze mourning figure surrounded by iron pillars with tops joined by arcs. The composition stands on huge granite slabs. The sculpture of the mourning figure (1990) was designed by sculptor Vladas Vildžiūnas and the monument design (2009) is by architects Rimantas Dičius, Vitaliy Troshin and Vasoly Barmin. The pedestal bears the inscriptions, in the front: in Lithuanian «Tėvynė Lietuva didžiuojasi», same in Latin: «Patria Lituania superbit» [Fatherland Lithuania is proud], in the back: «Tėvynė Lietuva verkia» and «Patria Lituania flet» [Fatherland Lithuania mourns]. A memorial plaque is attached at the supporting granite slab.
