= Pavel Eisner =

Czech linguist, writer and translator (1889–1958)

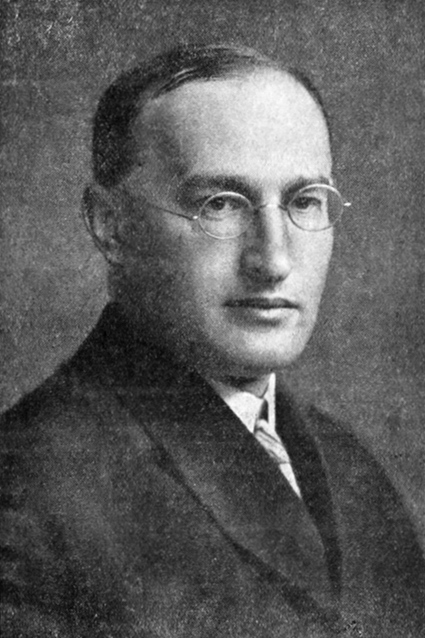
- Pavel Eisner, ca 1928
- Born: November 16, 1889
- Died: July 8, 1958 (aged 69)

Pavel Eisner (16 January 1889 – 8 July 1958), also known as Paul Eisner and under the pseudonym Vincy Schwarze, was Czech linguist and translator and the author of many studies about Czech language. He is considered one of the most important Czech translators of all time and was said to be proficient in 12 languages - English, French, Icelandic, Italian, Hungarian, German, Norwegian, Persian, Russian, Serbian, Spanish, and Tibetan. He produced some of the earliest Czech language translations of Franz Kafka's work.

== Biography ==
Eisner came from a Jewish family in Prague. He was bilingual from his childhood. He studied Slavonic, German, and Romance languages at Prague's German Charles-Ferdinand University, and graduated in 1918. He worked as a translator for the Czech Chamber of Commerce and Crafts and, at the same time, edited for the German-language newspaper, Prager Presse. During this time, he also contributed to several cultural magazines. Since 1936 he was a member of Prague linguistic circle. During the German occupation he was persecuted as a Jew, but survived because he was married to a non-Jewish German woman. He managed to publish a book under his pseudonym Vincy Schwarze.

== Works ==
- Chrám i tvrz (1946)
- Čeština poklepem a poslechem (1948)
- Malované děti (1949)
- Franz Kafka and Prague (1950)
- Rady Čechům jak se hravě přiučiti češtině (1992)
