= Vorkuta uprising =

1953 gulag revolt in USSR

Coordinates: 67°30′51″N 64°05′02″E

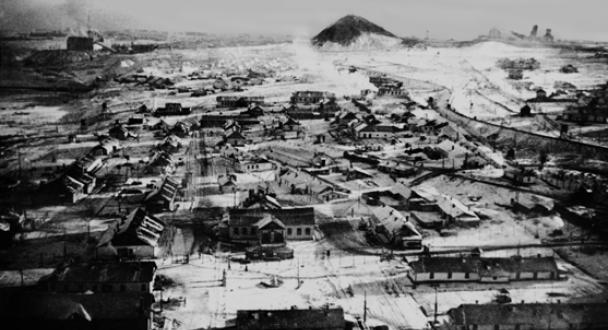
- Vorkuta Gulag in 1940s
Date	19 July – 1 August 1953
Location	Vorkutlag, Vorkuta, Soviet Union
Result	Uprising suppressed

Belligerents
(Soviet Union) Soviet Authorities; Soviet Army; Prison Guards	Vorkuta inmates

Casualties and losses
None	57 killed
- Location within European Russia

The Vorkuta uprising was a major uprising of forced labor camp inmates at the Rechlag Gulag special labor camp in Vorkuta, Russian SFSR, USSR from 19 July (or 22 July) to 1 August 1953, shortly after the arrest of Lavrentiy Beria on 26 June 1953. The uprising was violently suppressed by the camp administration after two weeks of bloodless standoff.

== Background ==
Vorkuta Rechlag or Special Camp No. 6 consisted of 17 separate "departments" engaged in construction of coal mines, coal mining and forestry. In 1946 it housed 62,700 inmates, 56,000 in July 1953. A substantial portion of the camp guards were former convicts. A major factor was the limited application of the March 1953 general amnesty, issued after the death of Joseph Stalin, to only convicts with criminal sentences and small prison terms, of which there were few in Vorkuta, while most of the inmates were political prisoners.

== Uprising ==
The uprising, initially in the form of a passive walkout, began on or before 19 July 1953, at a single "department" and quickly spread to five others. The initial demands were to give inmates access to a state attorney and due justice, and they quickly changed to political demands. According to the inmate Leonid Markizov, Voice of America and the BBC broadcast regular news about the events in the Rechlag, with correct names, ranks and numbers. Even without foreign assistance, strikes at nearby sites were clearly visible as the wheels of the mine headframes stopped rotating, and the word was spread by trains, which had slogans painted by prisoners on the sides, and whose crews spread news. The total number of inmates on strike reached 18,000. The inmates remained static within the barbed wire perimeters.

For a week following the initial strike the camp administration apparently did nothing; they increased perimeter guards but took no forceful action against inmates. The mines were visited by State Attorney of the USSR, Roman Rudenko, Internal Troops Commander, Ivan Maslennikov, and other top brass from Moscow. The generals spoke to the inmates who sat idle in camp courtyards, so far peacefully. However, on 26 July the mob stormed the maximum security punitive compound, releasing 77 of its inmates.

On 31 July camp chief Derevyanko started mass arrests of "saboteurs"; inmates responded with barricades. The next day, 1 August, after further bloodless clashes between inmates and guards, Derevyanko ordered direct fire at the mob. According to Leonid Markizov, 42 were killed on the spot, 135 wounded (many of them, deprived of medical help, died later). According to Solzhenitsyn, there were 66 killed.

== Notable participants ==
- The Latvian Catholic priest Jānis Mendriks was shot.
- John H. Noble

== Commemoration ==
In Yurshor there is a monument to the Lithuanian victims of the shooting during the Vorkuta uprising at Mine 29 "Yurshor". The monument is the bronze mourning figure surrounded by iron pillars with tops joined by arcs. The composition stands on huge granite slabs. The sculpture of the mourning figure (1990) was designed by sculptor Vladas Vildžiūnas and the monument design (2009) is by architects Rimantas Dičius, Vitaliy Troshin and Vasoly Barmin. The pedestal bears the inscriptions, in the front: in Lithuanian «Tėvynė Lietuva didžiuojasi», same in Latin: «Patria Lituania superbit» [Fatherland Lithuania is proud], in the back: «Tėvynė Lietuva verkia» and «Patria Lituania flet» [Fatherland Lithuania is mourns]. A memorial plaque is attached at the right front supporting granite slab in 2003.

== See also ==
- List of uprisings in the Gulag
- Novocherkassk massacre
