= Vorkutlag =

Soviet-era prison/labor camp

Vorkutlag Воркутлаг Rechlag, Pекалаг
- Forced labor camp
- Vorkuta Corrective Labor Camp, Воркутинский исправительно-трудовой лагерь
- Perimeter fence and watchtower, Vorkuta Gulag.
- Nicknames: Vorkuta, Vorkuta Gulag, Воркута
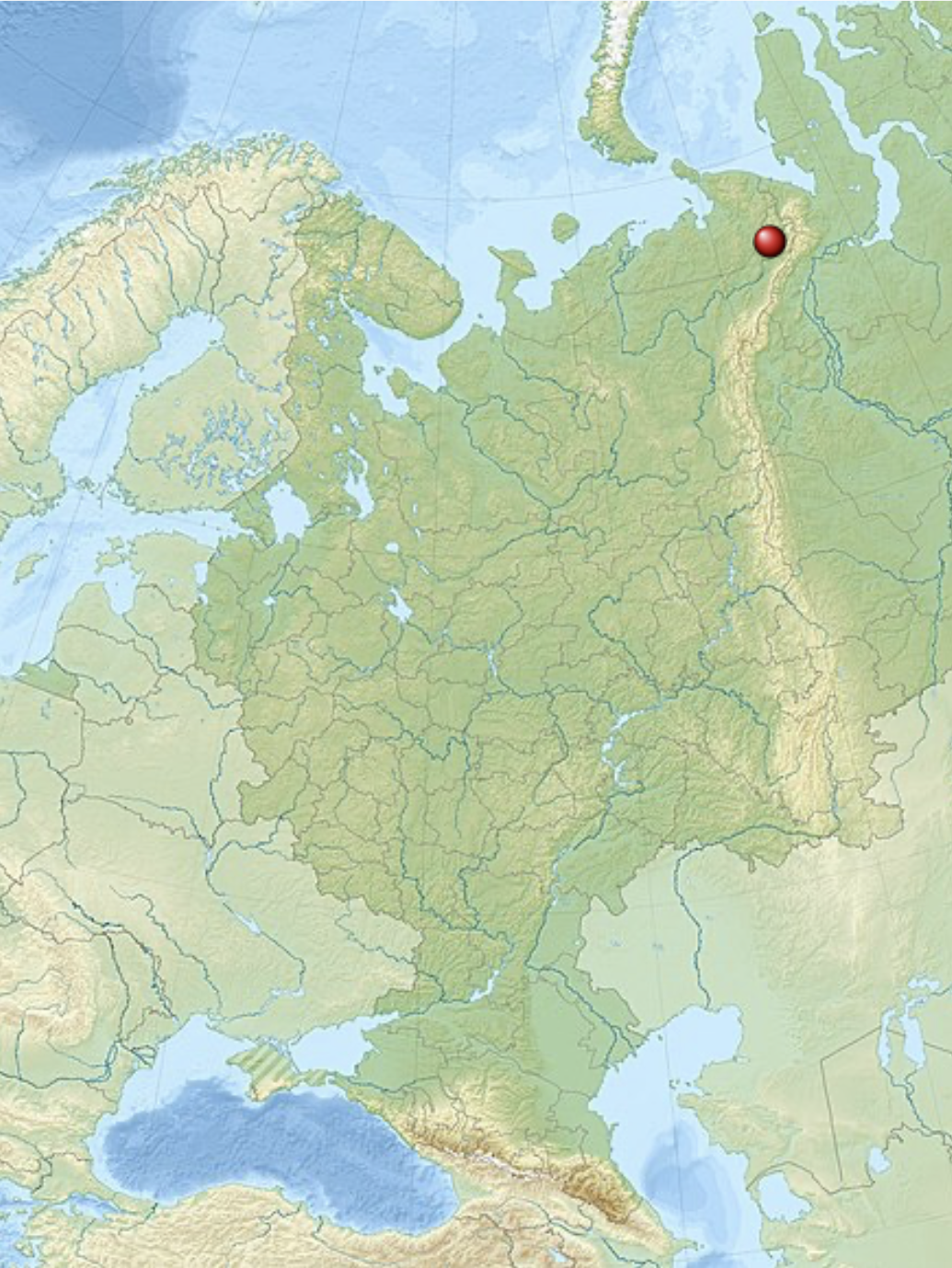
- Coordinates: 67°29′48.4080″N 64°3′38.2968″E
- Established: 1932
- Closed: 1962

Area
  - Total: 28.69 km^{2} (11.08 sq mi)

Population (1932–1962)
  - Total: 2,000,000
  - Density: 70,000/km^{2} (180,000/sq mi)

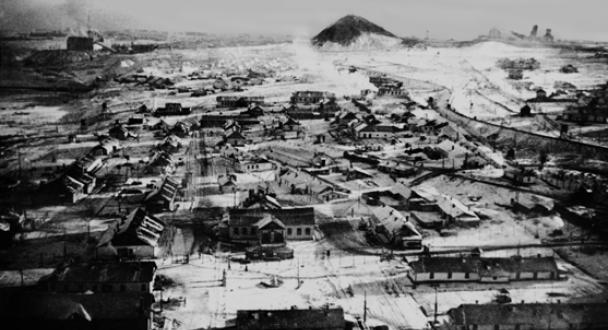
The Vorkuta industrial labor camp complex was located 160 km above the Arctic Circle. The city had a population of approximately 15,000 and about 50 camps with more than 50,000 inmates.

The Vorkuta Corrective Labor Camp (Russian: Воркутинский исправительно-трудовой лагерь, romanized: Vorkutinsky ispravitel'no-trudovoy lager'), commonly known as Vorkutlag (Воркутлаг), was a major Gulag labor camp in the Soviet Union located in Vorkuta, Komi Autonomous Soviet Socialist Republic, Russian Soviet Federative Socialist Republic. It was in operation from 1932 until 1962.

Vorkutlag was one of the largest camps in the Gulag system. The camp housed 73,000 prisoners at its peak in 1951, containing Soviet and foreign prisoners including prisoners of war, dissidents, political prisoners ("enemies of the state") and common criminals who were used as forced labor in the exploitation of coal mines, coal mining works, and forestry. The camp was administered by the Joint State Political Directorate from 1932 to 1934, the NKVD from 1934 to 1946 and the Ministry of Internal Affairs (Soviet Union) from 1946 until its closure in 1962. The Vorkuta Gulag was the site of the Vorkuta Uprising in July 1953.

== History ==
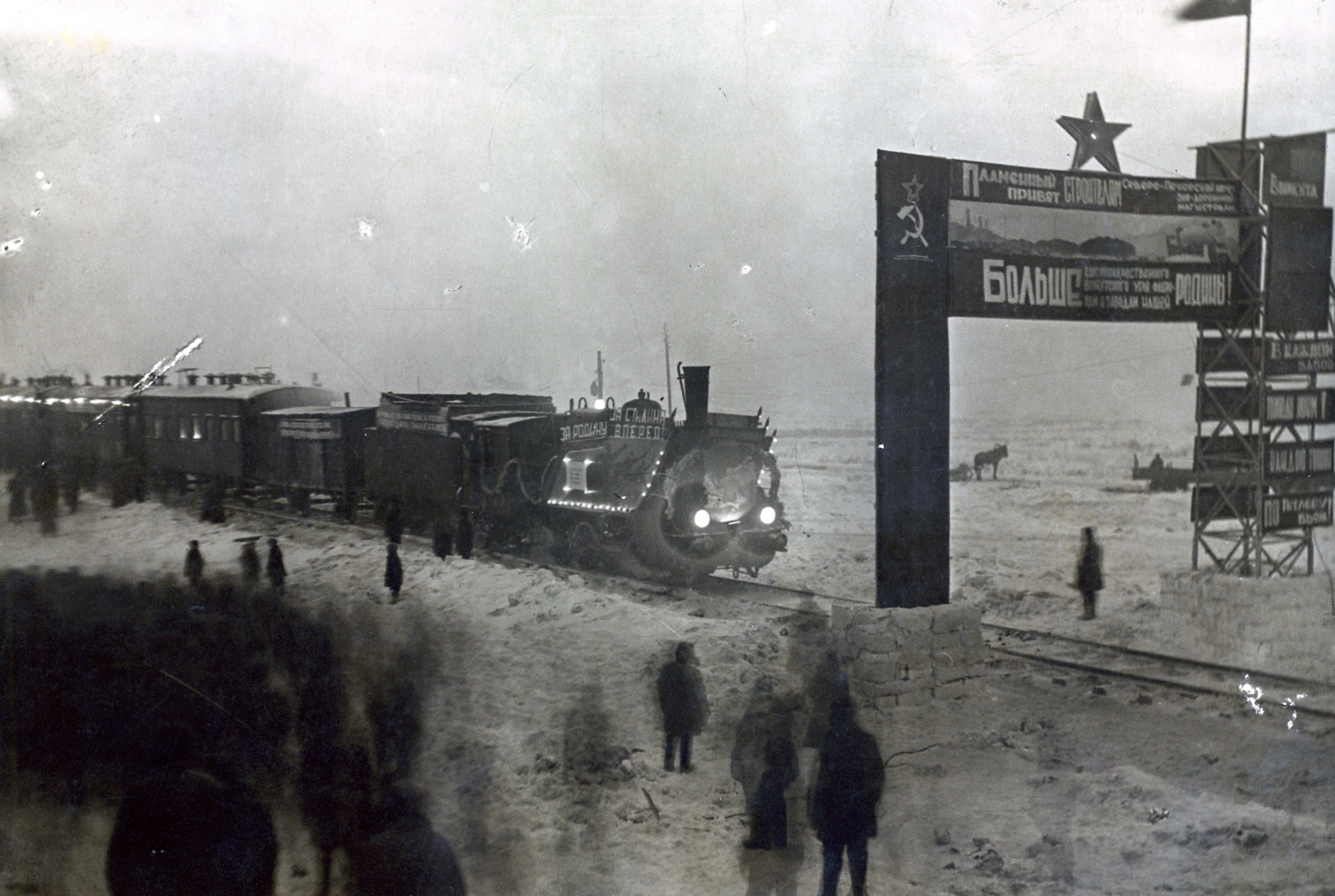
Meeting of the first train in Vorkuta. Yakov Fomin, December 28, 1941.

Vorkutlag was established on May 10, 1938 by splitting it from Ukhtpechlag.

In 1937 the construction of the Pechora Mainline railway started. The new railway was an addition to the Northern Railway (Russia) which connected Moscow to Vorkuta, Konosha, Kotlas, the camps of Inta and other Northern parts of European Russia. It was completed in 1941. The first train arrived at Vorkuta on 28 December 1941. This important event was attended by residents of Vorkuta and photographed by Yakov Yakovlevich Fomin, who was in charge of constructing the railway. From 1939, Polish prisoners were held at Vorkuta following the occupation of Poland. Following the German invasion of the Soviet Union in 1941, Vorkuta was then also used to hold German prisoners of war captured on the Eastern Front in World War II as well as criminals, Soviet citizens and those from Soviet-allied countries deemed to be dissidents and enemies of the state. US soldiers were also held in the camp, a majority of whom were captured during the Korean War. Many prisoners did not survive their internment and died by freezing to death in the cold climate, starvation (food was scarce) or being worked to death. Prisoners were fed rye bread, buckwheat, meat, fish and potatoes but in very small amounts. Prisoners resorted to killing rats or stray dogs for food. Self-harm was common in the camp: if an inmate sustained an injury they would be sent to the hospital where conditions were better. The average amount of working time in the camp was 16 hours a day for every inmate. The guards who protected and managed the Gulag were a part of the NKVD, MVD and the Red Army. Guards were most often recruited on three-year contracts after completing their basic military service. Regulations allowed guards to shoot without warning any prisoner who strayed outside the designated work zone or too near a camp fence.

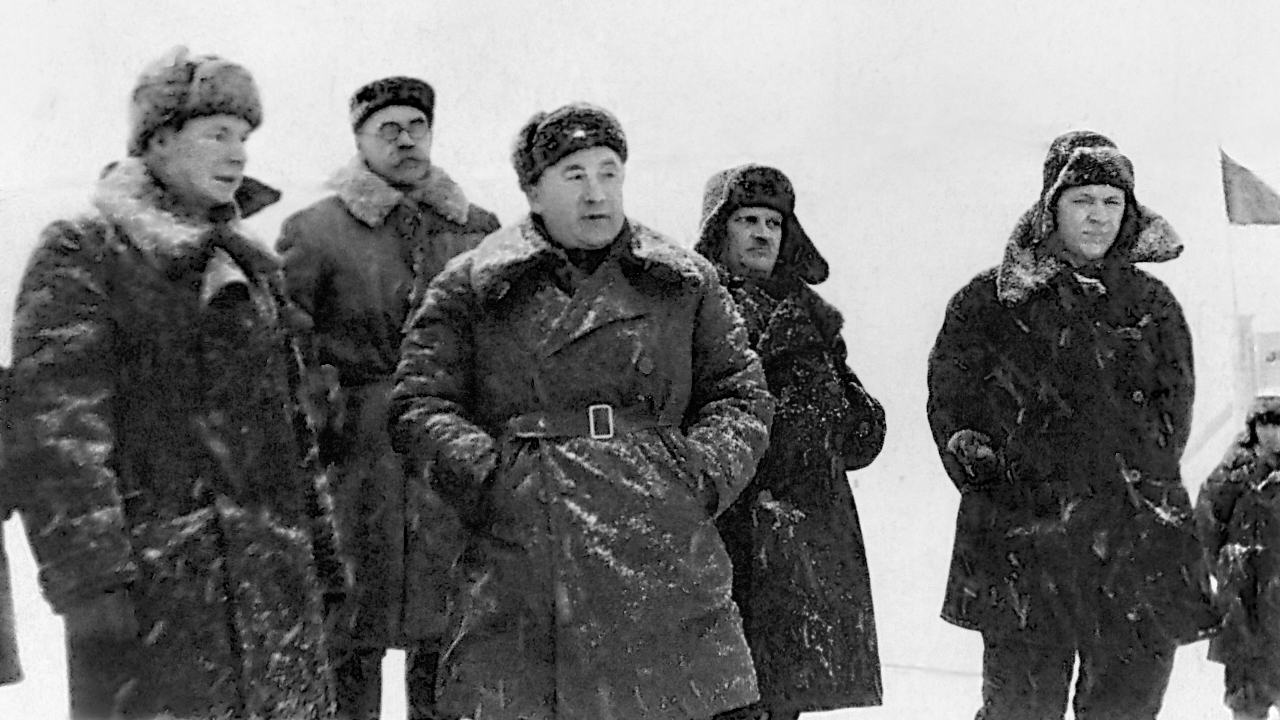
Mikhail Maltsev and Yakov Fomin

=== World War II ===
==== Working conditions ====
Working conditions in the camp during World War II were especially brutal. Working hours were increased from eight to ten hours for non-prisoners, and from ten to twelve hours for prisoners. A nationwide lack of food, due to compromised farmland and the mass diversion of food to the Red Army, meant that feeding Gulag prisoners was not a high priority. In 1943 and 1944, the majority of Vorkutlag prisoners lived on the cusp of starvation. The death rate of the Gulag system as a whole rose as well. In 1939 and 1940, the death rates were 38.3 and 34.7 per thousand prisoners respectively. In 1941, this rose to 67.3/thousand, in 1942 to 175.8/thousand, and in 1943, 169.7/thousand.

==== Coal production ====
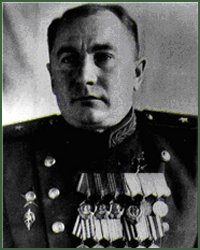
Major-General Mikhail Mitrofanovich Maltsev

As a significant coal production center, Vorkutlag played a major role in the Soviet Union's war economy, supplying the factories of the war machine. Because of Germany's initial strides in the war, the Soviet Union's major coal supplier was Ukraine. By the end of 1941, the Nazi army had occupied virtually all of Ukraine, cutting Soviet coal production in half. In 1943 the Vorkutlag's prisoner population exploded, as did the rate of coal extraction. On March 17, 1943, the importance of Vorkutlag coal was underscored with the replacement of camp director Leonid Tarkhanov with Engineer-Colonel (and later Major-General) Mikhail Maltsev. Maltsev was personally selected by NKVD director Beria to oversee the camp's production.

Maltsev used his military experience to drastically increase production. He increased the working hours of both prisoners and non-prisoners and, to improve discipline, rewarded hard-working prisoners and punished their opposites. Typically, a reward for hard work would come in the form of early release, while punishment was usually execution.

The growth of coal production in Vorkuta during Maltsev's tenure from 1943 to 1947 was tremendous. Over this five-year period yearly coal output more than doubled. From 1940 to 1948, the year after Maltsev left Vorkuta, yearly coal production increased eighteen-fold. This was due not only to Maltsev's administration, but also to the large investment by the Soviet government in the camp.

==== Importance to Leningrad ====
The city of Leningrad, during the siege of Leningrad – the longest siege of the Second World War – was a major consumer of Vorkutlag coal. Following the collapse of the Don and Moscow coal basins in Ukraine, Vorkuta became the nearest coal source to Leningrad, which experienced an almost total blockade from September 1941 to January 1944. The widespread coal scarcity across the Soviet Union, and specifically the dire requirement in Leningrad, instilled a pressing need to expedite the expansion of the Vorkuta coal mining infrastructure. Vorkutlag's coal was a vital source of energy for the encircled Leningrad.

=== Lesoreid uprising, 1942 ===
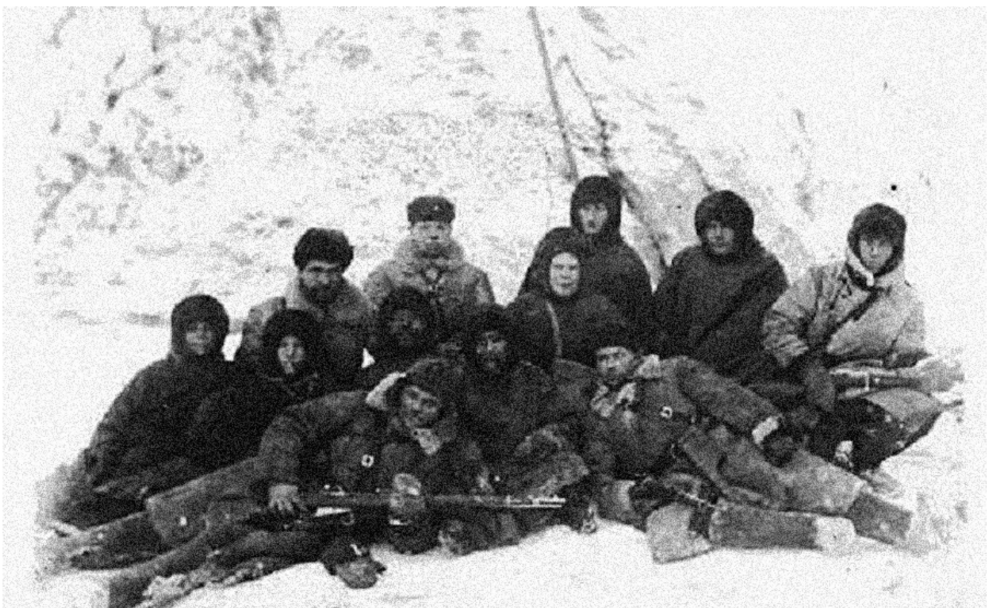
Soviet military guard after the suppression of the Lesoreid uprising

The armed Lesoreid uprising began on January 24 in the Lesoreid lagpunkt (Russian: лагпункт «Лесорейд») of Vorkutlag, a remote logging camp. The uprising involved over 100 prisoners and non-prisoners. Led by the non-prisoner chief of Lesoreid, Mark Retyunin, the rebels aimed to capture the nearby small town of Ust-Usa, though their ultimate goal remains unclear. Retyunin and his group overpowered and disarmed the camp guards, then invited other prisoners to join the uprising. They acquired food, equipment, and clothing from the camp storehouses before heading towards Ust-Usa.

The rebels successfully attacked the town's communication office, state bank, NKVD office, and jail, freeing prisoners in the process. However, they were repelled at the airfield and faced a fierce battle at the local militia office. Reinforcements, including militarized guards from the nearby Polia-Kur'ia camp section, forced the rebels to retreat from Ust-Usa.

Forty-one rebels fled on sleds, attempting to reach Kozhva, the nearest station on the Northern Pechora Mainline railway. Along their journey, they acquired more supplies and weapons from various sources, including an arms convoy. Despite their efforts, the rebels realized they were being pursued and changed their course to head west down the Lyzha River.

Government forces, led by Deputy Narkom and Obkom Second Secretary Vazhnov, engaged in several encounters with the rebels, with casualties on both sides. The main group of rebels, led by Retyunin, was defeated on February 2, and several rebels chose to take their own lives instead of being captured. The last group of rebels was captured on March 4. In total, 48 rebels were killed, and eight were captured.

=== Vorkuta Uprising, 1953 ===
The Vorkuta uprising occurred in Vorkuta at the Rechlag from 19 July 1953 to 1 August 1953. Inmates from various camp detachments who were forced to work in the region's coal mines went on strike. The uprising—initially in the form of a passive walkout—began on or before July 19, 1953, at a single "department" and quickly spread to five others. Initial demands—to give inmates access to a state attorney and due justice—quickly changed to political demands. Strikes at nearby sites were clearly visible as the wheels of the mine headframes stopped rotating. Word was spread by trains, which had slogans painted by prisoners on the sides, and whose crews spread news. The total number of inmates on strike reached 18,000. The inmates remained idle within the barbed wire perimeters. For a week following the initial strike the camp administration apparently did nothing; they increased perimeter guards but took no forceful action against inmates. The mines were visited by State Attorney of the USSR, Roman Rudenko, Internal Troops Commander, Ivan Maslennikov, and other top brass from Moscow. The generals spoke to the inmates who sat in the camp courtyards, peacefully. However, on July 26, a mob stormed the maximum security punitive compound, releasing 77 of its inmates. The commissars from Moscow remained in Vorkuta, planning their response. The inmates demanded lower production targets, wages and to be allowed to write more than two letters a year. Concessions were made, including being allowed to write more than two letters a year and one visitor a year but the inmates demanded more. On July 31 camp chief Kuzma Derevyanko started mass arrests of "saboteurs"; inmates responded with barricades. The next day, on August 1, after further bloodless clashes between inmates and guards, Derevyanko ordered direct fire at the mob resulting in the deaths of at least 53 prisoners and injuring 135 (many of them, deprived of medical help, died later) although estimates vary. According to Aleksandr Solzhenitsyn, there were 66 killed. Among those shot was the Latvian Catholic priest Jānis Mendriks.

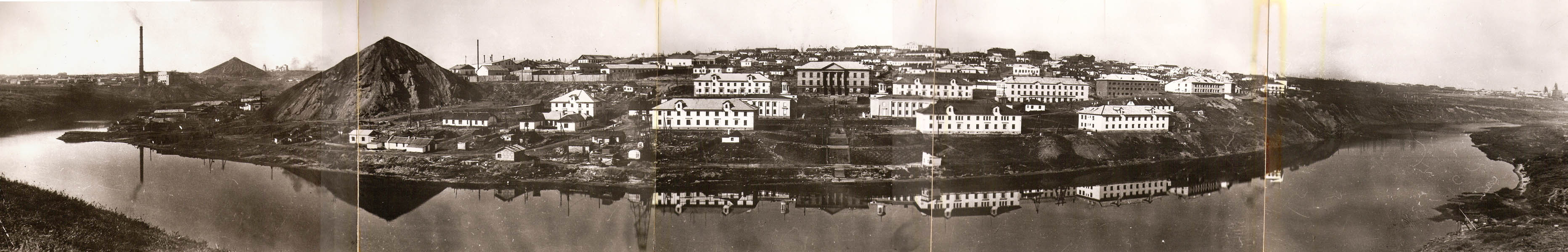
Panorama view of Vorkuta, photo taken in the late 1950s.

=== Closing of Vorkuta camp, 1962 ===
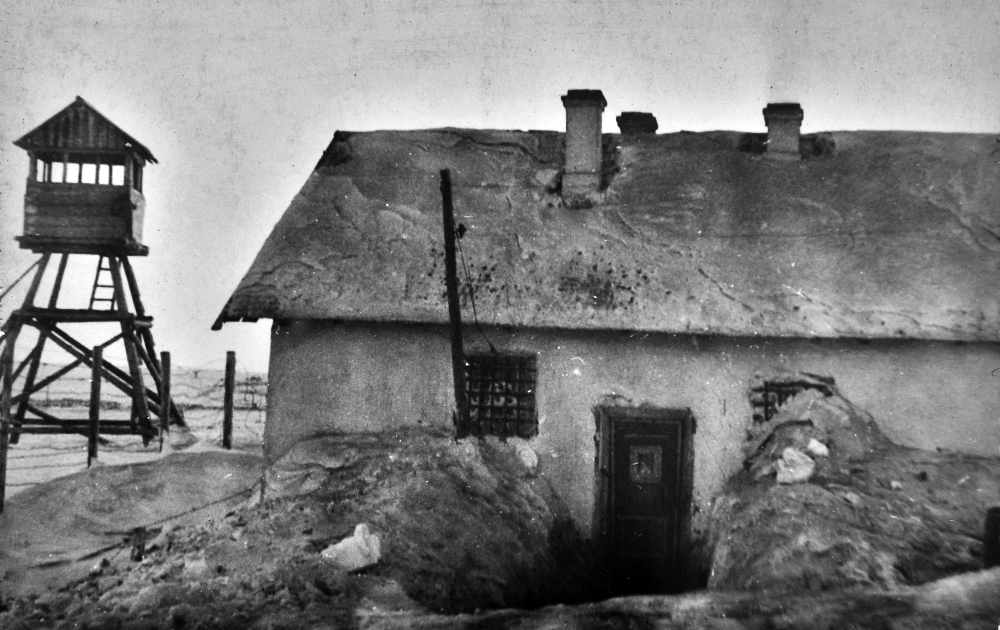
Penal detention cell ("penal isolator") of a camp in the Vorkuta Region, 1945

The Vorkuta camp was liquidated by order of the USSR Ministry of Internal Affairs and eventually closed in 1962. Closure of Gulag camps started when Nikita Khrushchev came to power. Khrushchev started a series of reforms known as De-Stalinization which resulted in the closure of most camps. Vorkuta became one of the most well known camp of the Gulag, gaining a reputation of being one of the worst in the Soviet Union. About two million prisoners were sent to Vorkutlag from 1932 until the closure in 1962. The number of deaths in the camp was estimated to be 200,000. Most prisoners were released after the closure but large numbers of Soviet citizens who were former prisoners settled in Vorkuta, either due to the restrictions on their settlement elsewhere, their poor financial situation or simply having nowhere to go. Russian human rights organization Memorial estimates that of the 40,000 people collecting state pensions in the Vorkuta area, 32,000 are former Gulag inmates or their descendants.

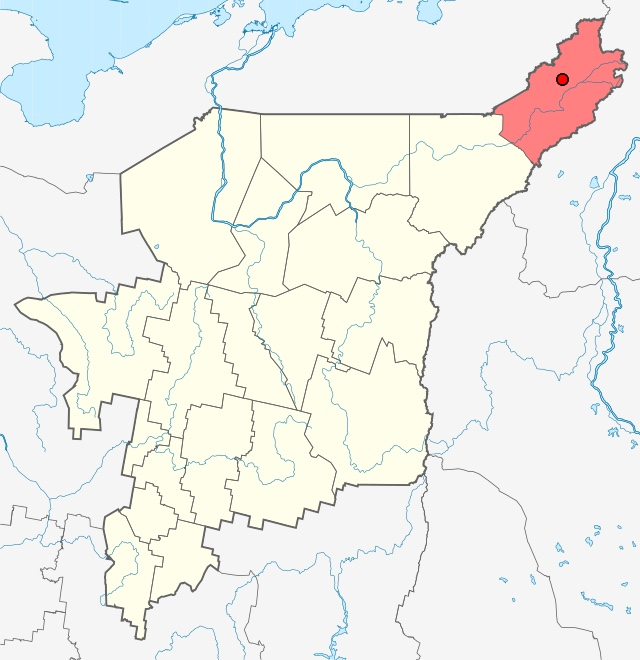
Vorkuta (red dot), Vorkuta District (highlighted in red), Komi ASSR.

== Recent history ==
Vorkuta is now a town in the Komi Republic, Russia. The remains of the Gulag camps are abandoned and partly or almost entirely destroyed. Vorkuta's population is in heavy decline and the town is slowly being abandoned. After the dissolution of the Soviet Union, mining companies moved farther into the southern regions of Russia. As the majority of the population in Vorkuta worked in the nearby coal mines, many lost their jobs and left after the coal mine companies moved. The estimated population in 2019 was about 50,000 and is still decreasing.

== Location ==
Vorkuta Gulag camp was located in Vorkuta, Komi Autonomous Soviet Socialist Republic in the Russian Soviet Federative Socialist Republic, Soviet Union. It was 160 km above the Arctic Circle and roughly 50 km from the Ural mountain range. The town and the camp were located in the North Eastern part of the Komi ASSR 8 km (4.9 mi) below the urban locality of Oktyabrskii (Октябрьский), 13 km (8 mi) West of the village Sovetsky (Советский) and 14 km (8.6. mi) East of Zapolyarny (Заполярный). The surrounding localities, villages, towns and lands were all located in one larger district called Vorkuta City or Vorkuta District (город Воркута) which made up the whole Northeastern tip of the Komi ASSR. Komi ASSR and Vorkuta City are located in the very northern part of European Russia.

Komi ASSR (Komi Autonomous Soviet Socialist Republic)

== Climate ==
Vorkuta was extremely cold since it was located in the very northern part of European Russia within the Arctic Circle. The average temperatures from winter to summer being −25 °C (−13 °F) to 18 °C (64 °F) and reaching as low as −52 °C (−62 °F). Vorkuta has a subarctic climate (Köppen Dfc) with short cool summers and very cold and snowy winters. Midnight sun or "Polar Day" was common in Vorkuta where the sun wouldn't set for three months, it lasted from 30 May to 14 July, Vorkuta also had Polar night. The polar night lasted from 17 December to 27 December which greatly affected the prisoners in Vorkutlag. Prisoners weren't given sufficient clothing to survive the climate and many froze to death.

The average February temperature is about −20 °C (−4 °F), and in July it is about 13 °C (55 °F). Vorkuta's climate is influenced both by its distance from the North Atlantic and the proximity to the Arctic Ocean, bringing cold air in spring.

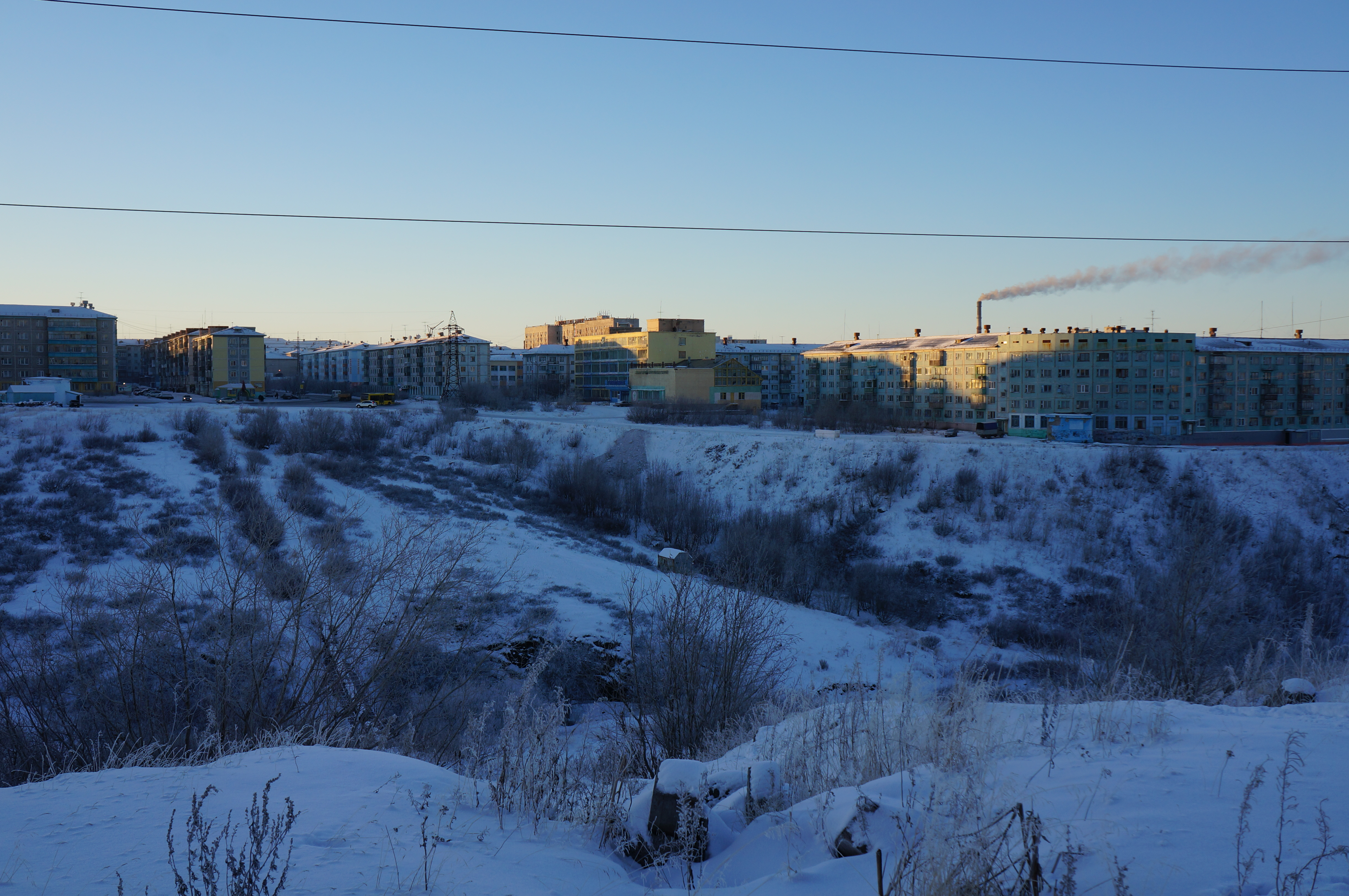
Vorkuta in 2012

== Notable inmates ==
- Heinz Baumkötter (1912–2001) SS concentration camp doctor in Mauthausen concentration camp, arrested in 1947, released in 1956.
- Homer Harold Cox (1921–1954), kidnapped in East Berlin in 1949 and released in 1953, together with US Merchant Mariner Leland Towers, Americans in the Gulag.
- Walter Ciszek (1904–1984): American Catholic priest and memoirist arrested in 1941, released in 1955 - survived.
- Shlomo Dykman (1917–1965): Jewish-Polish translator and classical scholar.
- Kurt Eccarius (1905-1984): functionary at Sachsenhausen concentration camp, arrested in 1947, released in 1956.
- Alexey Eisner, Soviet poet, translator and writer.
- Valentín González (1904–1983): Spanish Communist and Spanish Republican Army brigade commander during the Spanish Civil War – successfully escaped in 1949.
- Johannes Hiob (composer) (1907–1942), Estonian composer, organist and choral conductor
- Aleksei Kapler was Vorkutlag's most well-known prisoner at the time, was a well known screenwriter, writing the films "Lenin in October" and "Lenin in 1918". Kapler was imprisoned allegedly because of his love affair with Joseph Stalin's daughter Svetlana. He was sentenced to five years on fabricated charges of anti-Soviet agitation.
- Anton Kaindl (1902–1948): SS commandant of Sachsenhausen concentration camp between 1942 and 1945, died in 1948.
- Jaan Kross (1920–2007): Estonian writer.
- Max Liedtke (1894-1955), German military officer posthumously honored as Righteous Among the Nations by Israel for his resistance to the Nazi-SS and saving lives of many Jews in occupied Poland; died in the gulag in 1955.
- Elena Vladimirovna Markova (1923–2023), Soviet-Russian cyberneticist.
- Jānis Mendriks (1907–1953): Latvian Catholic priest, killed in the 1953 uprising.
- Der Nister (1884–1950): Yiddish writer.
- John H. Noble (1923–2007): American survivor of the Soviet Gulag system (released after 10 years) who wrote two books about experiences there.
- Eric Pleasants (1913–1998): British national who joined the Waffen-SS serving in the British Free Corps during the Second World War.
- Zvi Preigerzon (1900–1969): Hebrew writer and coal enrichment scientist.
- Nikolay Punin (1888–1953): Russian art scholar, curator and writer. Common law husband of poet Anna Akhmatova.
- Kalju Reitel (1921–2004): Estonian sculptor
- Georgy Safarov (1891–1942): Bolshevik revolutionary, member of the Communist Party of the Soviet Union – executed.
- Günter Stempel (1908–1981): East German politician and a member of the Liberal Democratic Party.
- Edward Buca. (1926-2013): Polish Home Army soldier who was arrested in August 1945, released in 1958.
- Joseph Scholmer (1913–1995): doctor working for the Central Health Authority in Berlin, Accused of being an agent of the Gestapo and the American and British Secret Services (Office of Strategic Services and MI6) in May 1949, arrested in 1949, released in 1953.
- Vytautas Svilas (1925–1992): Lithuanian resistance leader who attempted to start Guerrilla warfare in Lithuania, arrested in June 1945, after a brutal interrogation he was sentenced to 15 years of hard labour in the Gulags and 5 years of exile. released from Vorkuta in 1956.
- Vasyl Velychkovsky (1903-1973): Ukrainian Catholic priest, later Bishop of Lutsk, transferred to another prison in 1953 and subsequently released from Vorkuta in 1956.

== Notable guards and staff ==
- Popov, Boris Ivanovich, head of state security, senior lieutenant of state security (May 10, 1938 – ?).
- Tarkhanov, Leonid Alexandrovich, captain of state security (June 16, 1938 – March 17, 1943).
- Mikhail Maltsev, chief and head of Vorkutlag from March 17, 1943 to January 8, 1947.
- Kukhtikov, Alexey Demyanovich, Colonel (January 8, 1947 – April 15, 1952).
- Dyogtev, Stepan Ivanovich, chief, colonel (April 15, 1952 – ?); in 1955 he was mentioned as the head of Rechlag in the rank of general; at the same time, Rechlag was reorganized by joining Vorkutlag on May 28, 1954.
- Fadeev, Alexander Nikolaevich, acting chief, colonel (April 1, 1953 – June 25, 1953).
- Kuzma Derevyanko, Derevyanko was the chief of the Vorkuta camp from 1951 until his death in 1954.
- Prokopyev, Georgy Matveevich, Acting Chief, Lieutenant Colonel of Internal Service (July 29, 1953 — May 30, 1954)
- Prokopyev, Georgy Matveevich, chief, colonel (May 31, 1954 – January 30, 1959).
- Titov, Pavel Yakovlevich, chief, colonel (January 30, 1959 – ?).

=== Deputy chief ===
- Chepiga G. I., deputy chief, major, mentioned on December 11, 1946.
- Fadeev A. N., deputy chief, colonel, from July 17, 1948 to April 1, 1953.

=== Chiefs of the special unit ===
- Zoya Voskresenskaya, the chief of the Special Section of Vorkuta prison-camp, who served between 1955 and 1956.

== Gallery, 1940–1968 ==
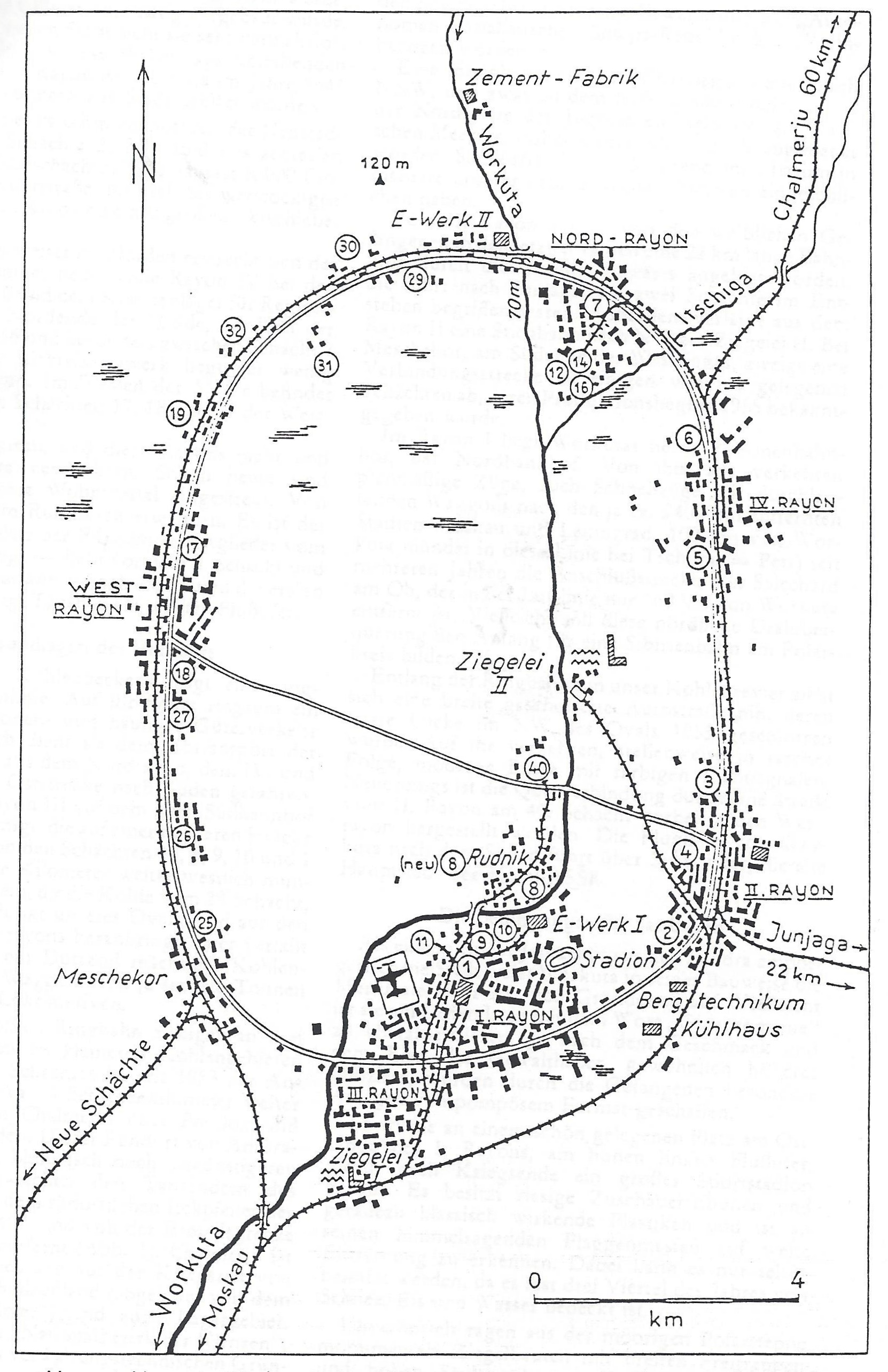
Map of the Vorkuta labor camp (in German). The numbers of the shafts in the circles, Map drawn between 1951 and 1956, image taken from Geography Volume XI, 1957, p. 208. Kurt Behrens: Germans in penal camps and prisons in the Soviet Union, Volume V/1/2/3. Publisher Ernst and Werner Gieseking, Bielefeld. Munich 1965, p. 25.

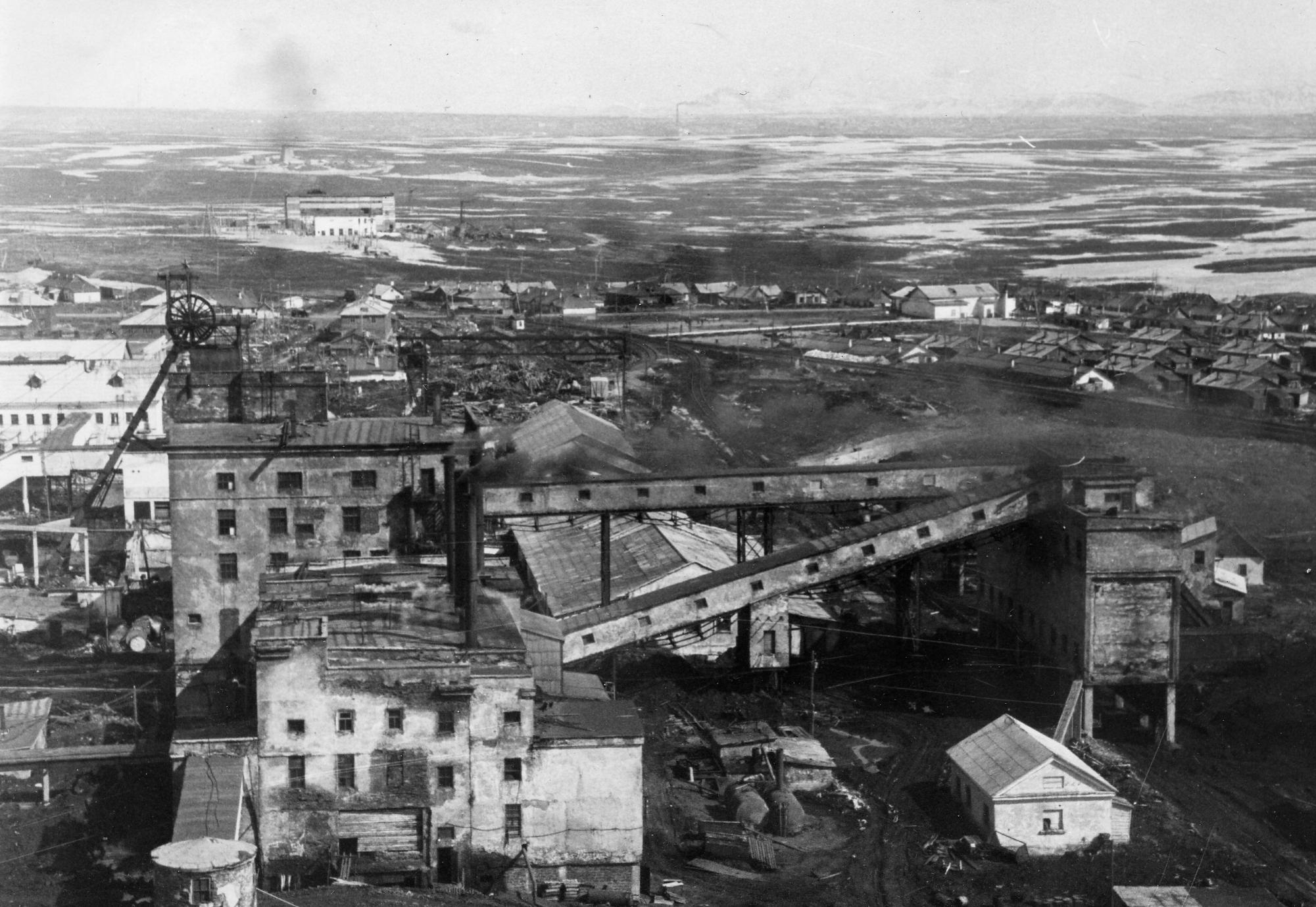
Coal Mine 25, Vorkuta, 1968.

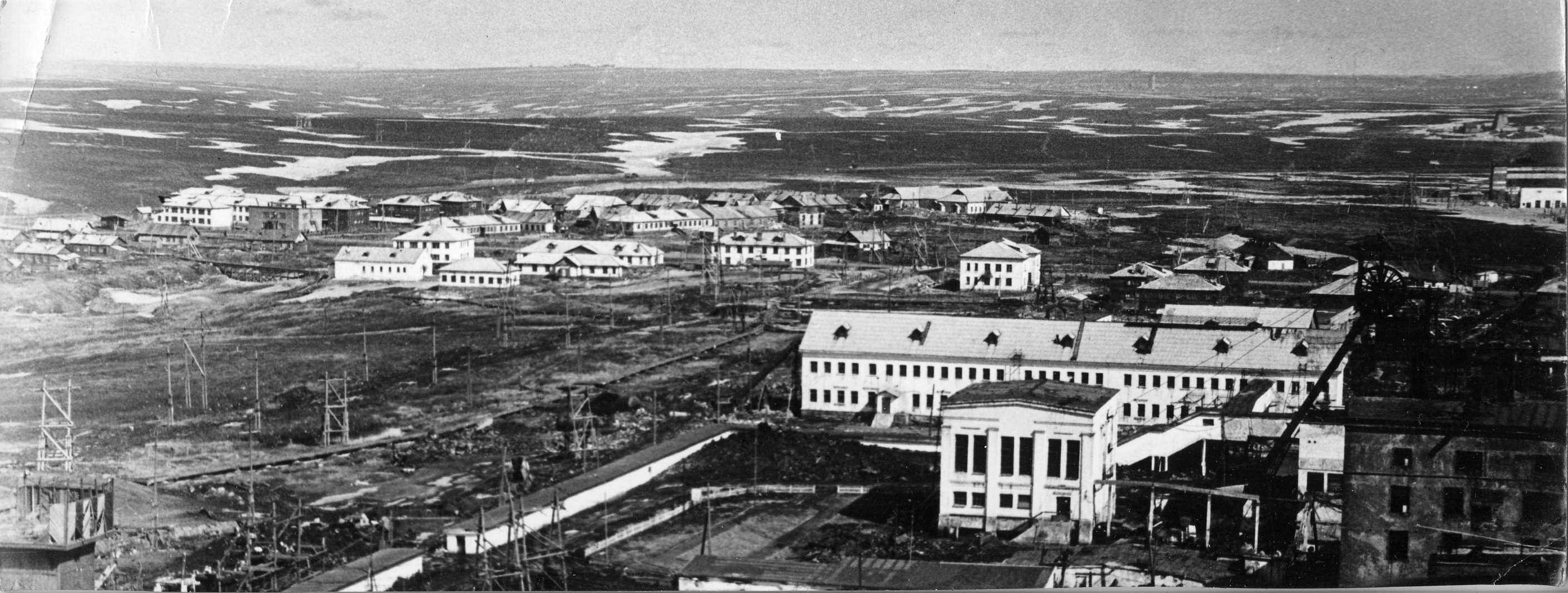
Coal Mine 25, photo taken from waste bank, 1968.

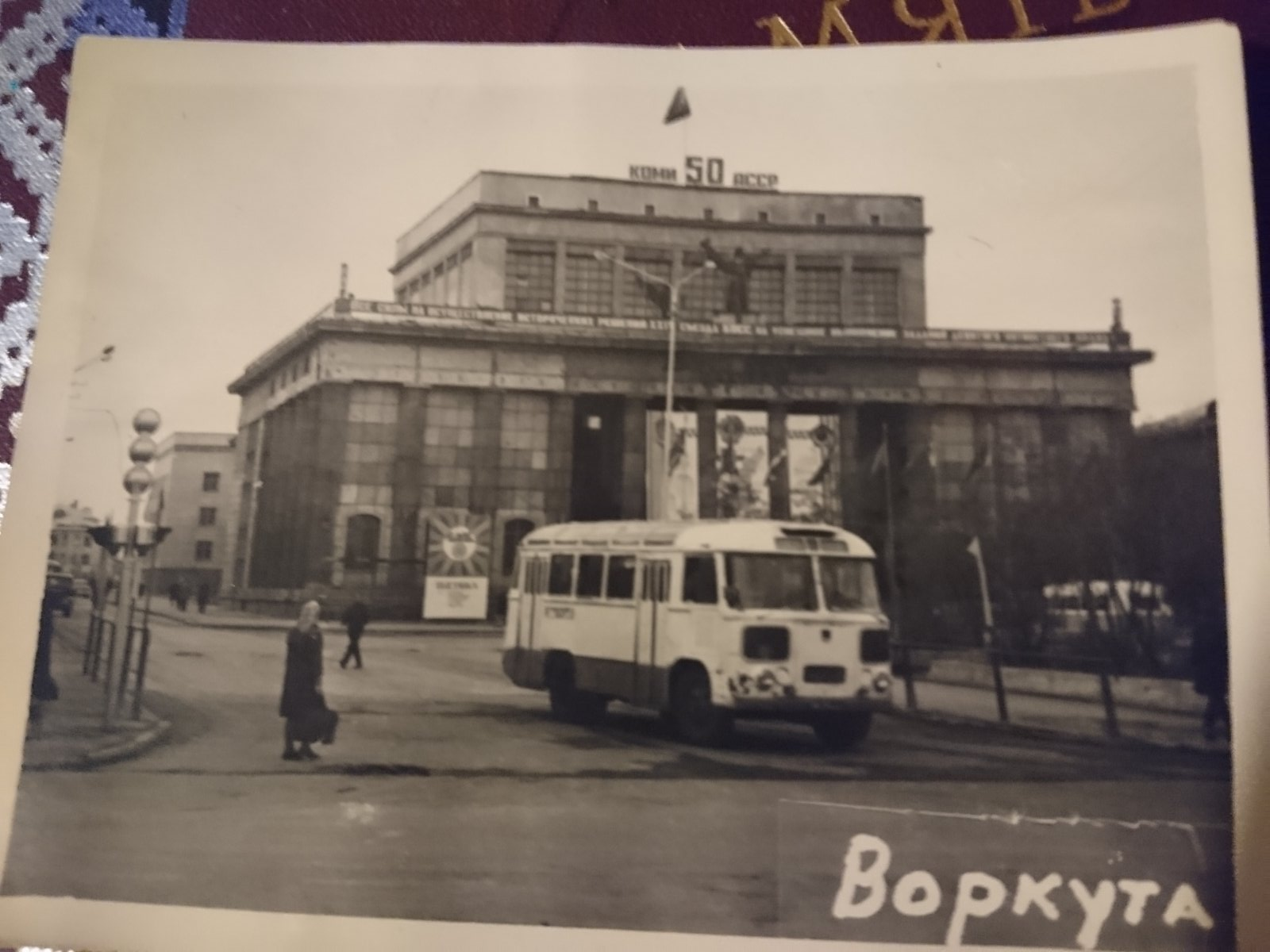
Miners' Palace of Culture, Vorkuta, 1963.

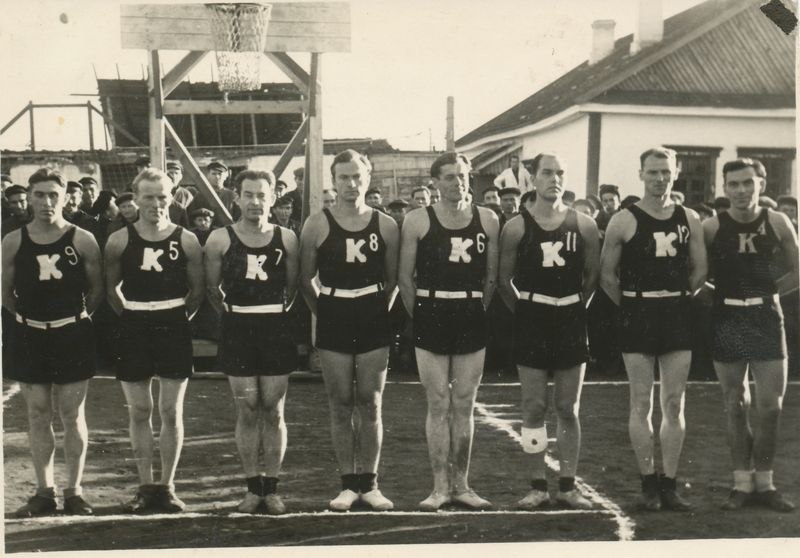
Basketball team of Lithuanian political prisoners, Vorkuta, 1954.

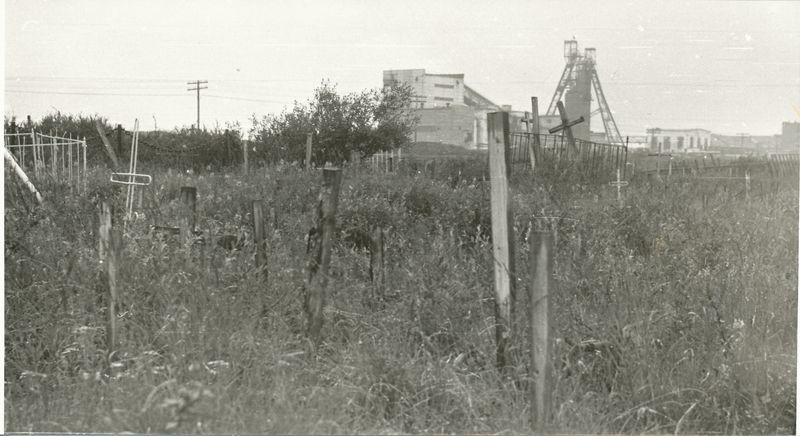
Graves of the Lithuanian political prisoners in Vorkutlag, 20th century

== See also ==
- Vorkuta
- Vorkuta uprising
- Vorkuta mine disaster
- Gulag
- Memoirs about Vorkutlag
- NKVD
- Red Army
- Soviet Union
