= Aleksandr Chernov =

Russian geologist and paleontologist

Aleksandr Aleksandrovich Chernov (Russian: Алекса́ндр Алекса́ндрович Черно́в) was a Russian and Soviet geologist and paleontologist. He was made a Hero of Socialist Labor in 1957, and granted the title of Honored Scientist of the RSFSR in 1946.

Chernov was born on July 11, 1877, in Solikamsk in the Solikamsky Uyezd of the Perm Governorate of the Russian Empire.

He published more than 140 scientific papers, mainly devoted to the study of geology and minerals of the Middle and Northern Urals, Pai-Khoi (Polar Urals), and Pechora territory. The paleontological material he collected served as the basis for the Paleozoic stratigraphy of the western slopes of the Northern Urals and Pai-Khoi. In his early works, he studied the geology of the Kama region: "Essay on the geological structure of the environs of Solikamsk" (1888), "On the question of the conditions for the occurrence of the Kama salt-bearing strata" (1908) and others. He theoretically substantiated the existence of the Pechora coal basin.

He died on January 23, 1963, in Syktyvkar in the Komi Republic, Russia.
