= Pemboy (disambiguation) =

Pemboy (Russian: Пембой) is a river in Priuralsky District, Yamalo-Nenets Autonomous Okrug, Russia

Pemboy may also refer to:

- Pemboy Ridge, Komi Republic, Russia
- Pemboy proving ground, Komi Republic, Russia
- Mount Pemboy, geological natural monument, Komi Republic, Russia
