= Kara Depression =

Geologic formation in Russia

- Depression
- Location: Nenets Autonomous Okrug, Russia

The Kara Depression is a depression in the Extreme North of European Russia, by the mouth of Kara River, north-east of the Pay-Khoy Ridge (a continuation of the northern Ural Mountains). It is of diameter 50–60 km (31–37 mi) and filled with Quaternary deposits.

The depression is part of the Pechora coal basin.
