= Ust-Kara =

Ust-Kara may refer to either of the 2 settlements in Russia located at the mouth of a river named Kara:

- Ust-Karsk, formerly Ust-Kara, in Zabaykalsky Krai
- Ust-Kara, Nenets Autonomous Okrug, in Zapolyarny District of Nenets Autonomous Okrug
