= Pemboy Ridge =

Ridge in Komi Republic, Russia

The Pemboy Ridge, also Pemboy Upland or Paemboy (Russian: Пембой, Паэмбой) is a small ridge in Komi Republic, Russia in the northern part of Polar Urals to the west of the Ochenyrd ridge. It is a narrow slightly curved upland stretching for about 7 km from southwest to northeast and consisting of eight smaller ridges separated by ravines. The fifth one (from the southwest) is the highest and contains Mount Pemboy of height 420.8m. On March 29, 1984 Mount Pemboy was declared geological natural monument of Komi Republic of zakaznik type.

It is located beyond the Arctic Circle on the watershed of rivers Silovayakha and Khalmer'yu, 15km northwest of the ghost town Khalmer-Yu. On top of Mount Pemboy there are an observation tower and a helicopter pad. It is one of popular tourist attractions in Russian Arctic.
