= Tupolev Tu-160 =

Russian strategic bomber aircraft

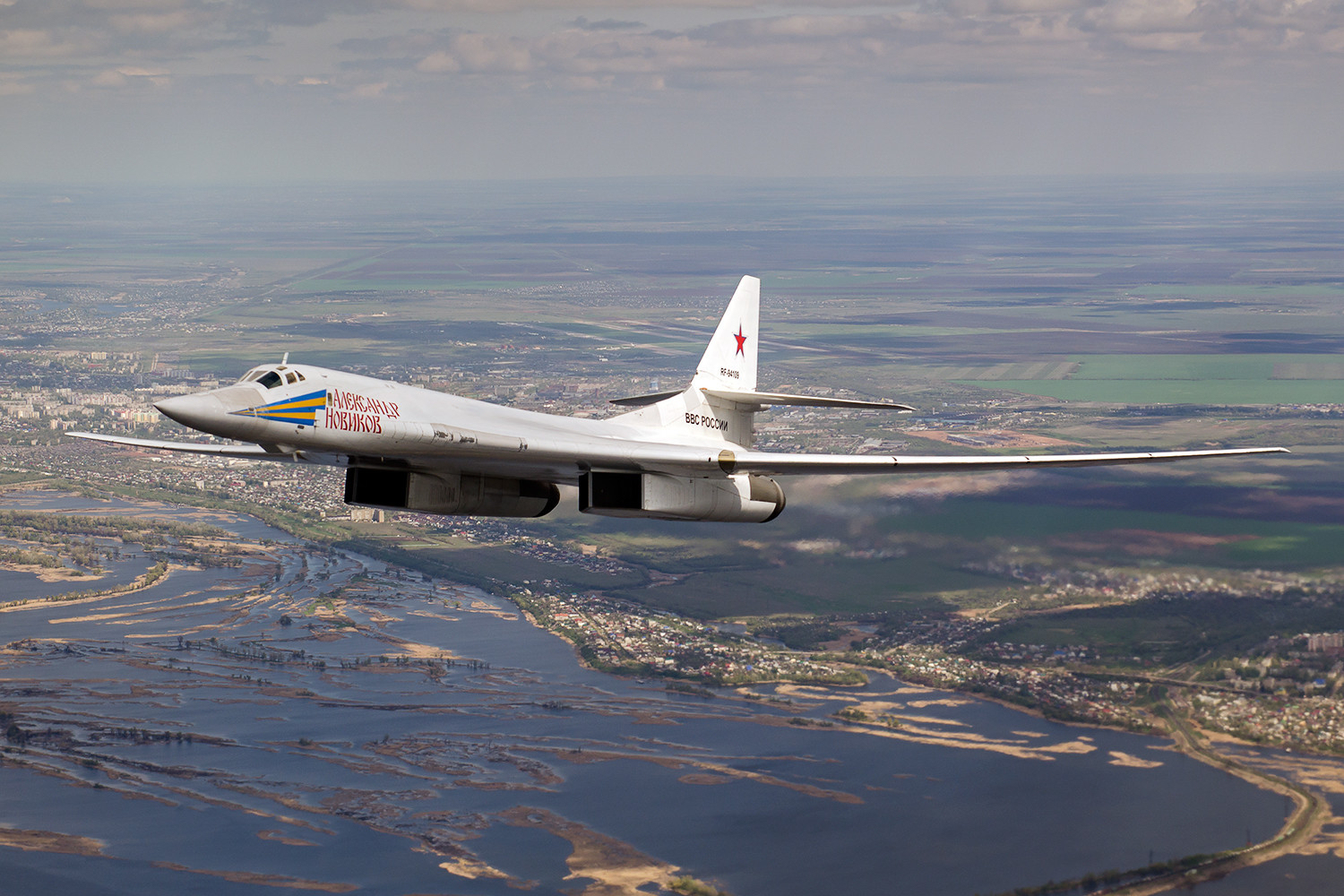
- Tu-160 "Alexander Novikov" overflying the Volga River near Saratov, Russia

General information
- Type: Supersonic strategic heavy bomber
- National origin: Soviet Union/Russia
- Designer: Tupolev
- Built by: Kazan Aircraft Production Association
- Status: In service
- Primary users: Russian Aerospace Forces Soviet Air Forces (former); Ukrainian Air Force (former)
- Number built: 41 (9 test and 32 serial)

History
- Manufactured: 1984–1992, 2002, 2008, 2017, 2021–present
- Introduction date: April 1987
- First flight: 18 December 1981

The Tupolev Tu-160 (Russian: Туполев Ту-160 «Белый лебедь», romanized: Bely Lebed, lit. 'White Swan'; NATO reporting name: Blackjack) is a Soviet/Russian nuclear-capable supersonic, variable-sweep wing heavy strategic bomber and airborne missile platform designed by the Tupolev Design Bureau in the 1970s. The aircraft is large, longer than a Boeing B-52 Stratofortress at 54 m, with wingspan 56 m when spread, 36 m when swept back. The Tu-160 is operated by the Long Range Aviation branch of the Russian Aerospace Forces.

The Tu-160 entered service in 1987, the last strategic bomber designed for the Soviet Air Forces. It was built to serve as both a conventional and nuclear bomber. Production was stopped in 1992 following the dissolution of the Soviet Union in 1991, and the newly independent Russian and Ukrainian air forces inherited a fleet of 13 and 19 Tu-160s, respectively. Following protracted negotiations, the Russian Federation purchased eight Ukrainian Tu-160s, while the remaining 11 were scrapped in the late 1990s under the Nunn–Lugar Cooperative Threat Reduction agreement. Following these actions, the sole operator of the aircraft type became the Russian Aerospace Forces' Long Range Aviation branch, which still had 17 Tu-160s in service as of 2022. The type had its combat debut in November 2015 during the Russian military intervention in the Syrian Civil War, conducting numerous airstrikes using Kh-101 air-launched cruise missiles. Various overseas deployments have been conducted, including to distant nations such as Venezuela and South Africa.

Since the early 2000s, the active fleet has undergone several upgrades, largely focusing on various electronic systems. A program of modernising existing aircraft to a new Tu-160M standard and building new aircraft was embarked upon, with the first updated aircraft delivered in December 2014. Plans were announced in 2015 for the delivery of 50 new-built Tu-160Ms and the upgrading of 16 existing aircraft.

The new bombers are reported to have more sophisticated armament, engines, and avionics than the original Tu-160. In January 2022, the first newly-built Tu-160M performed a test flight, with two new aircraft planned for delivery in 2022 of ten on order.

== Development ==
=== Origins ===
The first competition for a supersonic strategic heavy bomber was launched in the Soviet Union in 1967. In 1972, the Soviet Union launched a new multi-mission bomber competition to create a new supersonic, variable-geometry ("swing-wing") heavy bomber with a maximum speed of Mach 2.3, in response to the US Air Force B-1 bomber project. The Tupolev design, named Aircraft 160M, with a lengthened blended wing layout and incorporating some elements of the Tu-144, competed against the Myasishchev M-18 and the Sukhoi T-4 designs. Work on the new Soviet bomber continued despite an end to the B-1A and, in the same year, the design was accepted by the government committee. The prototype was photographed by an airline passenger at a Zhukovsky Airfield in November 1981, about a month before the aircraft's first flight on 18 December 1981. Production was authorized in 1984, beginning at the Kazan Aircraft Production Association (KAPO).

=== Modernization ===
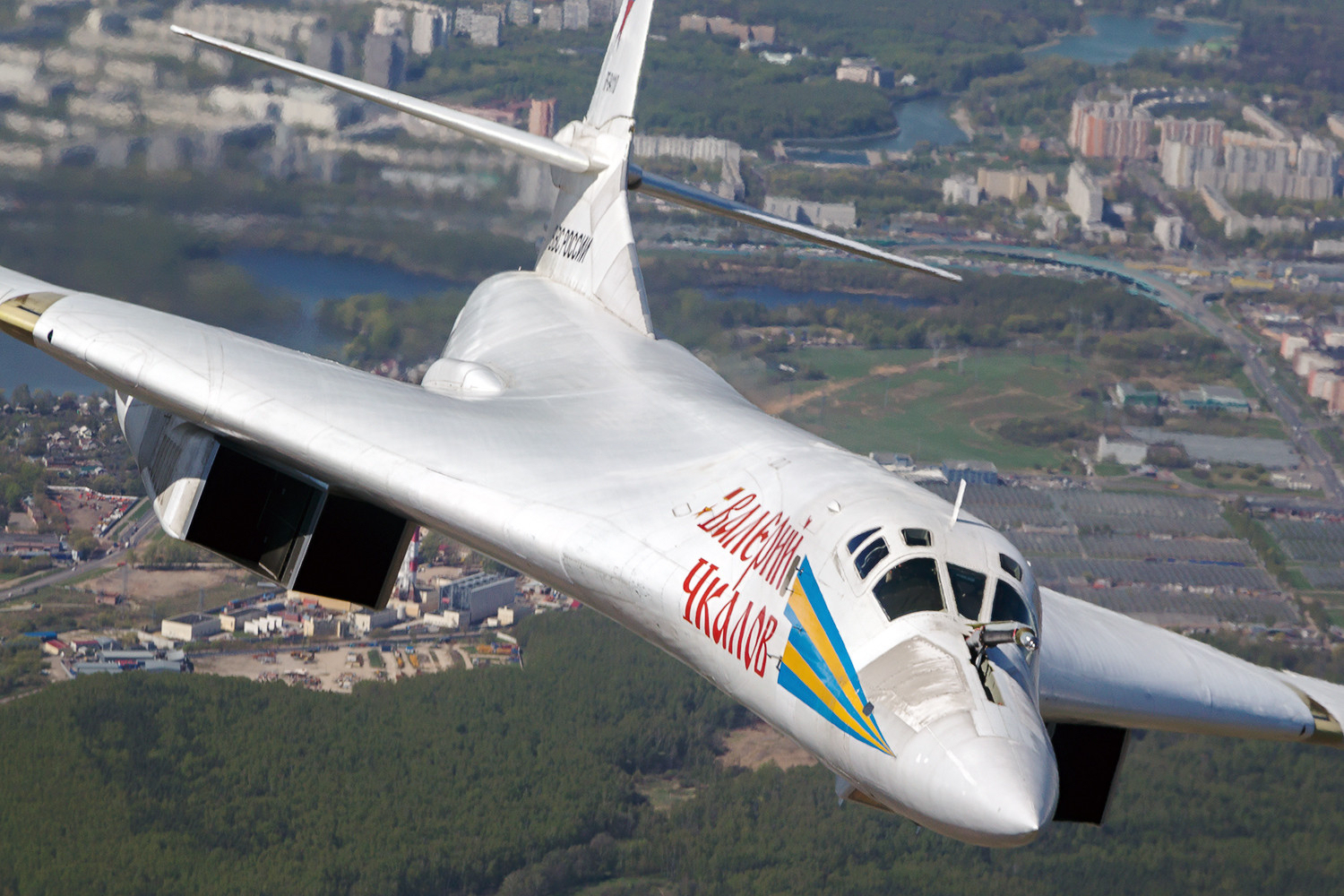
Tu-160 "Valery Chkalov" in 2015

In 2002, the Russian Defence Ministry and KAPO agreed to modernise 15 Tu-160s. In July 2006, the first overhauled and partially modernized aircraft was accepted into Russian service after testing; it reportedly received the capability to use conventional weapons but was not upgraded with new avionics as previously planned. The first modernized aircraft capable of carrying the new long-range Kh-555 conventional cruise missile was delivered to the Russian Air Force in April 2008; a follow-up contract for the modernization of three more aircraft is estimated to cost RUR3.4 billion (US$103 million).

The modernization appeared to be split into two phases, first concentrating on life extension with some initial communication–navigation updates, followed by engine upgrades after 2016. In November 2014, a Tu-160 upgraded with new radar and avionics performed its first flight. The aircraft was delivered to the Russian Air Force as the Tu-160M model in December 2014. The phase I update was due to be completed by 2016, but industrial limitations may delay it to 2019 or beyond.

Although Kuznetsov designed an NK-32M engine with improved reliability over the NK-32 engines, its successor company has struggled to deliver working units. Metallist-Samara JSC had not produced new engines for a decade when it was given a contract in 2011 to overhaul 26 of the existing engines; two years later, only four had been finished. Ownership and financial concerns hinder the prospects of a new production line; the firm insists it needs a minimum of 20 engines ordered per year but the government is only prepared to pay for 4–6 engines per year. A further improved engine was bench tested in 2012 and projected to potentially enter production as early as 2016.

On 2 February 2020, the modernized Tu-160M performed its first test flight at the airfield of the Kazan Aviation Plant named for I. Gorbunov. Deliveries started later that year, five aircraft were equipped with the new engines by August 2022. According to Vladimir Putin, 4 Tu-160M were delivered in 2023.

The CEO of Rostec has said that most of the bomber's systems and equipment will be more sophisticated than the initial Tu-160, particularly the armament, engines, and avionics.

=== Resumed production ===
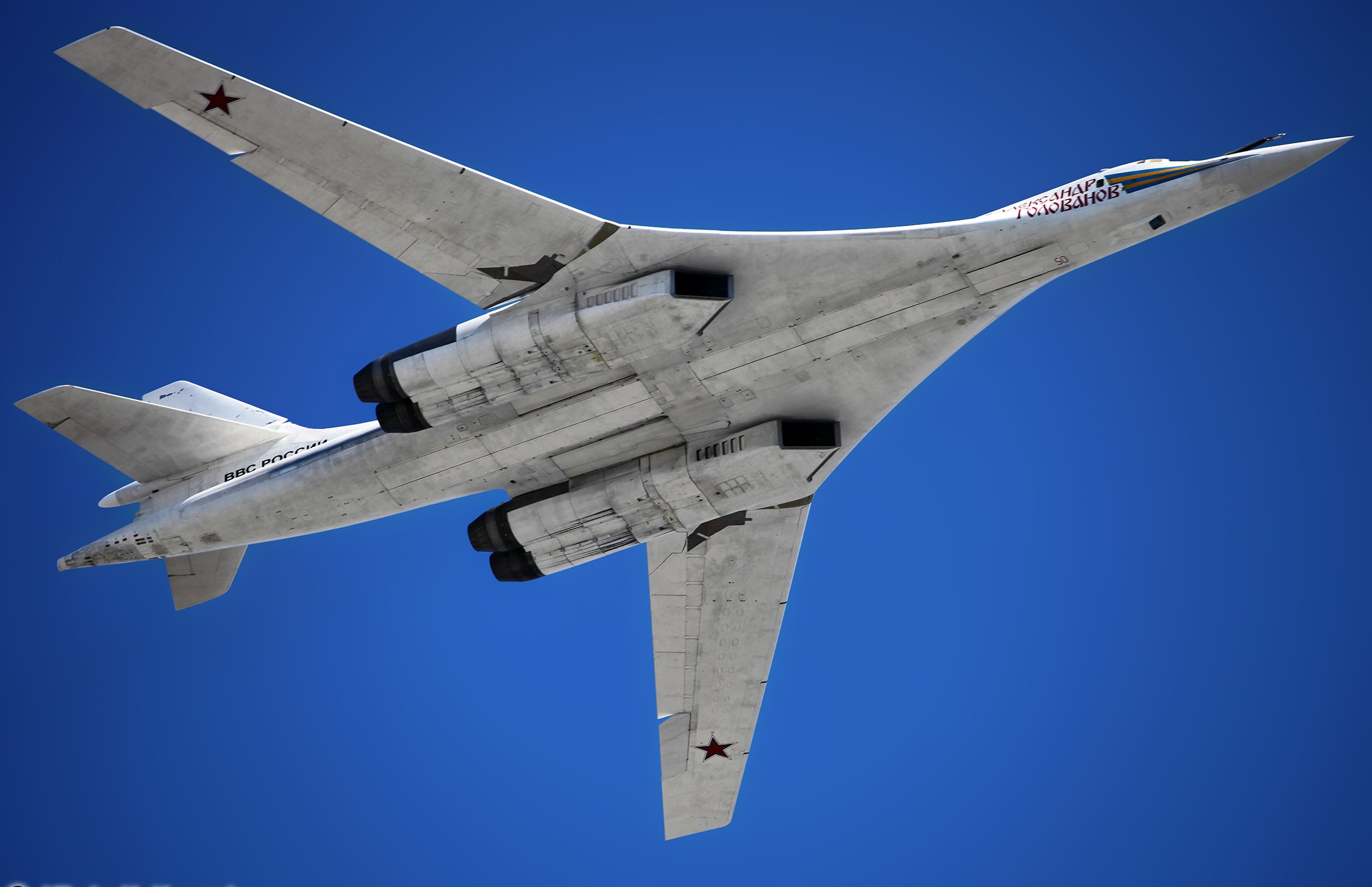
Tu-160 "Alexander Golovanov" at the 2013 Moscow Victory Day Parade

In 2008, Russia revealed plans for one new Tu-160 to be delivered every one to two years with the aim of increasing the active inventory to 30 or more aircraft by 2025–2030. On 29 April 2015, Russian Defense Minister Sergei Shoigu, on order of President Putin, announced that Tu-160 production would resume. In May 2015, TASS reported that the Russian Air Force would purchase at least 50 KAPO-built Tu-160s. General Viktor Bondarev stated that development of the PAK DA would proceed alongside Tu-160 production.

On 16 November 2017, a newly assembled Tu-160, built from an unfinished airframe, was unveiled during a roll-out ceremony at KAPO, signifying a restoration of some production techniques (such as electron-beam welding and titanium work) that had fallen into disuse after the termination of serial production in 1992. The new aircraft was named after Pyotr Deynekin, the first commanding officer of the Russian Air Force. According to Dmitri Rogozin, the serial production of wholly new airframes for the modernized Tu-160M2 should begin in 2019 with deliveries to the Russian Aerospace Forces in 2023.

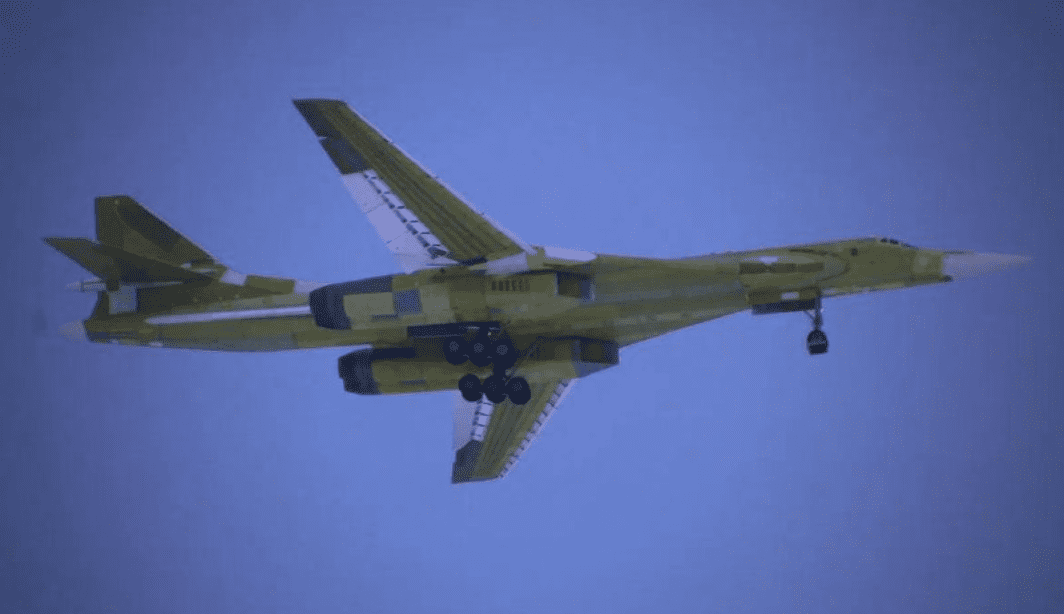
Maiden flight of the first newly manufactured Tu-160M2 "Pyotr Deynekin"

The "Pyotr Deynekin" Tu-160 performed its first public flight on 25 January 2018, during President Vladimir Putin's visit to the KAPO plant, and a contract for ten upgraded Tu-160M2s was signed. On 12 January 2022 a new-build Tu-160M had its first low altitude basic test flight. It is planned to deliver two new-build Tu-160M in 2022 with production increasing until all 50 new aircraft on order are delivered. In December 2022, United Aircraft Corporation announced that the second new-build Tu-160M and the fourth modernized Tu-160M were starting flight tests. It was also reported that the first new Tu-160 had completed factory testing. Four aircraft were delivered on 21 February 2024.

=== Other proposed variants ===
A demilitarized, commercial version of the Tu-160, named Tu-160SK, was displayed at Asian Aerospace in Singapore in 1994 with a model of a small space vehicle named Burlak attached underneath the fuselage.

In January 2018, Vladimir Putin, while visiting the KAPO plant, floated an idea of creating a civilian passenger supersonic transport version of Tu-160. Experts quoted by the news media were skeptical about the commercial and technological feasibility of such a civilian conversion.

== Design ==
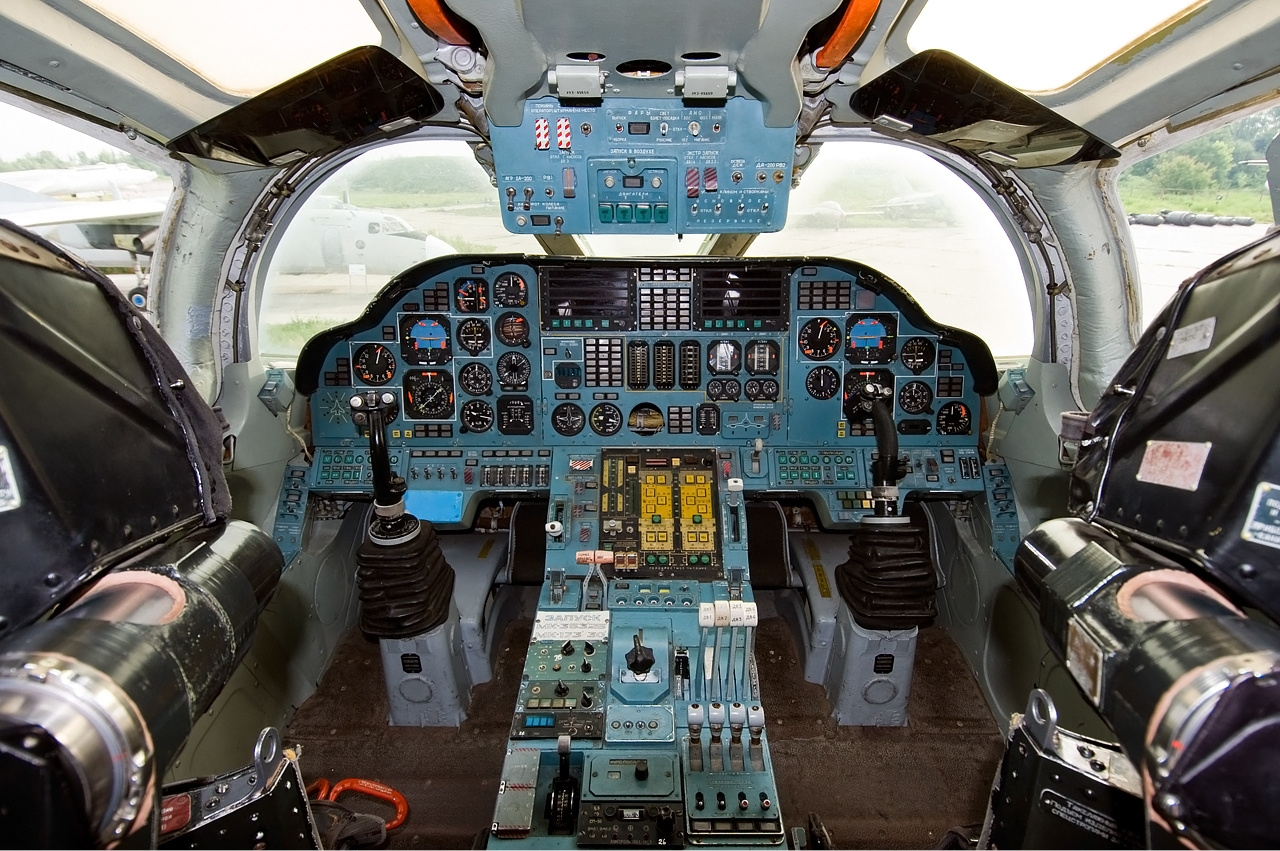
Cockpit view of a Tu-160

The Tu-160 is a variable-geometry wing aircraft. The aircraft employs a fly-by-wire control system with a blended wing profile, and full-span slats are used on the leading edges, with double-slotted flaps on the trailing edges and cruciform tail. Titanium constitutes around 30% of the aircraft's 110 t (242,508 lb) empty weight, and the largest component (the swing wing hinge) weighs six tonnes (13,230 lb). The Tu-160 has a crew of four (pilot, co-pilot, bombardier, and defensive systems operator) in K-36LM ejection seats.

The Tu-160 is powered by four Kuznetsov NK-32 afterburning turbofan engines, the most powerful ever fitted to a combat aircraft. Unlike the American B-1B Lancer, which reduced the original Mach 2+ requirement for the B-1A to achieve a smaller radar cross-section, the Tu-160 retains variable intake ramps, and is capable of reaching Mach 2.05 speed at altitude. The Tu-160 is equipped with a probe-and-drogue in-flight refueling system for extended-range missions, although it is rarely used. The Tu-160 has an internal fuel capacity of 130 tonnes (286,600 lb). In February 2008, Tu-160 bombers and Il-78 refueling tankers practiced air refueling during air combat exercise, as well as MiG-31, A-50 and other Russian combat aircraft.

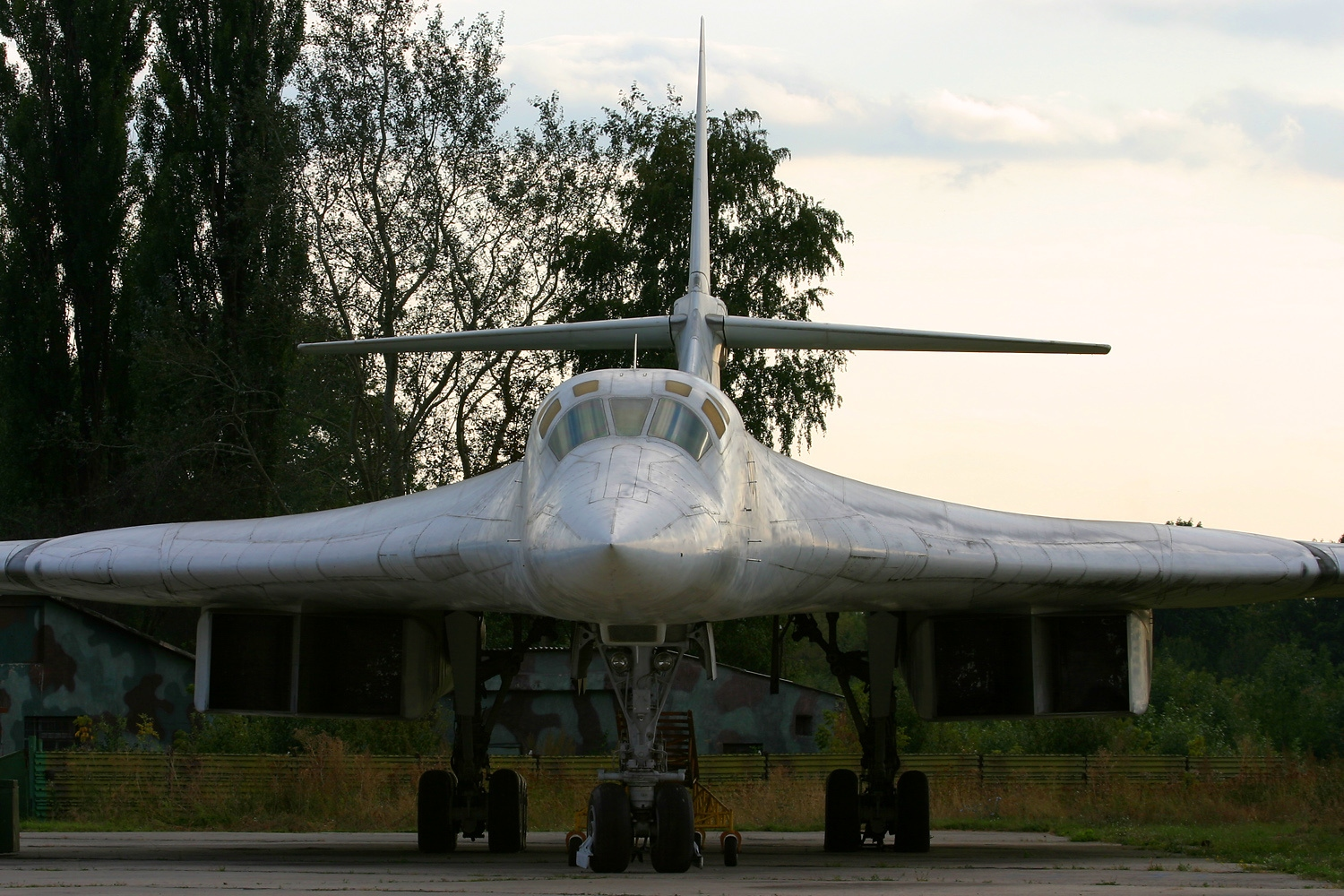
Blended wing profile

The aircraft carries a TsNPO Leninets Obzor-K (Survey, NATO: Clam Pipe) radar for tracking ground and air targets, and a separate Sopka Terrain-following radar. Although the Tu-160 was designed for reduced detectability to both radar and infrared signature, it is not a stealth aircraft.

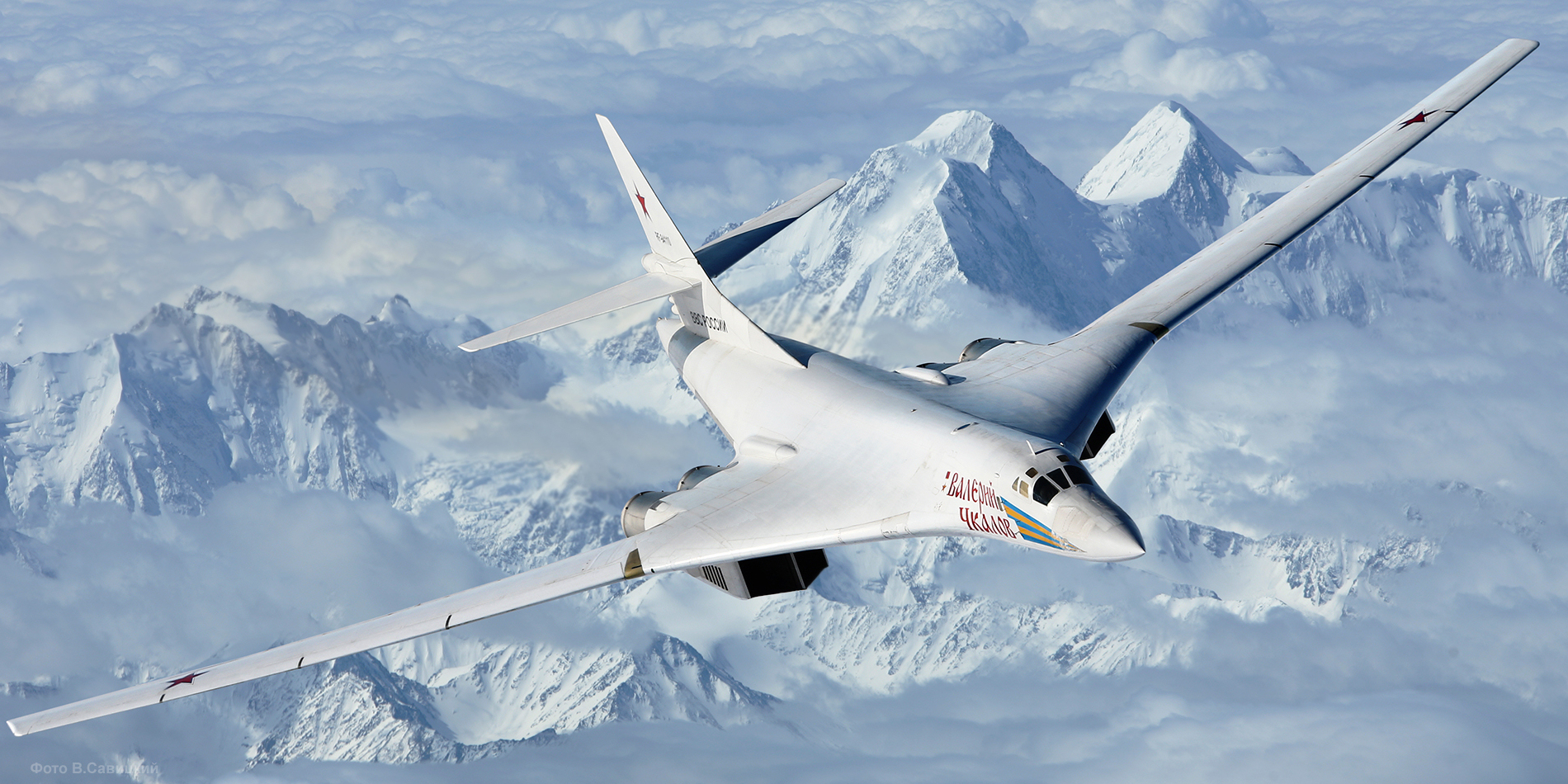
A 2012 air-to-air image.

Weapons are carried in two internal bays, each capable of holding 22,500 kg (49,600 lb) of free-fall weapons or a rotary launcher for missiles capable of carrying conventional or nuclear warheads. The aircraft's total weapons load capacity is 45,000 kg (99,208 lb). No defensive weapons are provided; the Tu-160 is the first post-World War II Soviet bomber to lack such defenses. In 2020, officials stated that the Russian Aerospace Forces is planning to arm the Tu-160 with new hypersonic missiles, in particular the nuclear-capable Kh-47M2 Kinzhal hypersonic air-launched ballistic missile.

While similar in appearance to the American B-1 Lancer, the Tu-160 is a different class of combat aircraft; its primary role being a standoff missile platform (strategic missile carrier). The Tu-160 is also larger and faster than the B-1B and has a slightly greater combat range, though the B-1B has a larger combined payload with external payload. Another noticeable difference is that the B-1's colour scheme is usually subdued dark gray to reduce visibility; the Tu-160 is painted with anti-flash white, giving it the nickname among Russian airmen "White Swan". On 16 September 2023, Commander of the long-range aviation Lieutenant General Sergei Kobylash announced that Russian Tu-160s were outfitted with the newest Kh-BD cruise missile with range of 6,500 km. Each bomber can carry 12 missiles separated on two rotary launchers.

== Operational history ==
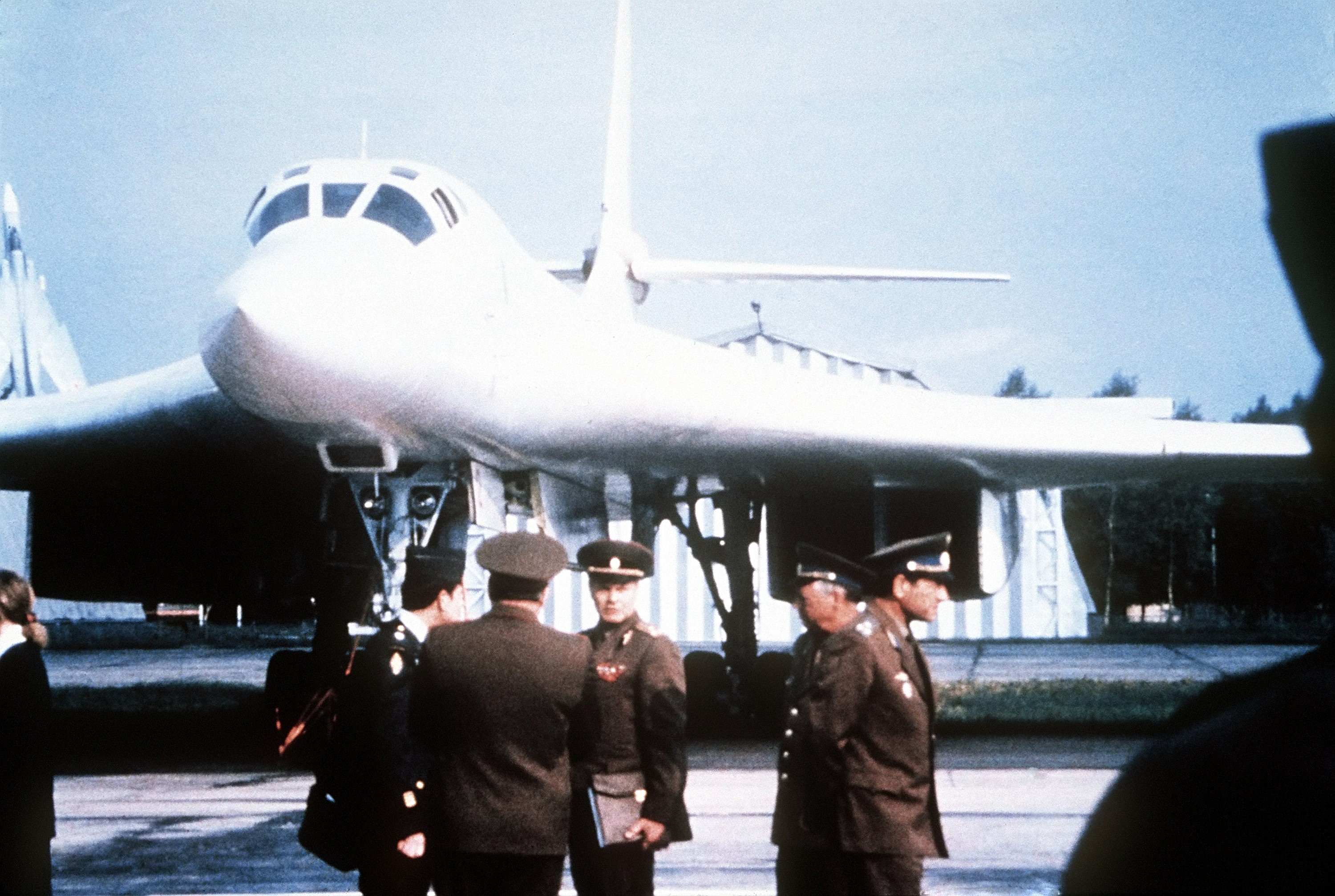
A Tu-160 with Soviet officers in front, September 1989

In April 1987, the Tu-160 entered operational service with the 184th Guards Heavy Bomber Regiment located at Pryluky, Ukrainian SSR. The regiment, previously operating Tu-16 and Tu-22M3 strategic bombers, was the first unit to receive the Tu-160. Squadron deployments to Long Range Aviation began that same month. The Tu-160's first public appearance in a parade came in 1989. During 1989 and 1990, a total of 44 world speed flight records in its weight class were set. In January 1992, Boris Yeltsin decided to end serial production of the Tu-160; 35 aircraft were completed by this time. Russia also unilaterally suspended flights of strategic aviation over remote regions.

A total of 19 Tu-160s were based inside the newly independent Ukraine during the dissolution of the Soviet Union. On 25 August 1991, the Ukrainian parliament decreed that the new nation would take control of all military units on its territory; a Defence Ministry was created that same day. By the mid-1990s, the Pryluky regiment had lost its value as a combat unit; 19 Tu-160s were effectively grounded due to a lack of technical support and spare parts. Ukraine considered the Tu-160s to be a bargaining chip in economic negotiations with Russia and of limited military value. While Russian experts, who examined the aircraft at the Pryluky Air Base in 1993 and 1996, assessed their technical condition as good, the US$3 billion price proposed by Ukraine was considered by Russia to be unacceptable. In April 1998, amid stalled negotiations, Ukraine decided to commence scrapping the fleet under the Nunn–Lugar Cooperative Threat Reduction agreement. In November, the first Tu-160 was deconstructed at Pryluky.

In April 1999, Russia resumed talks with Ukraine, proposing to purchase eight Tu-160 and three Tu-95MS bombers manufactured in 1991 (those in the best technical condition), as well as 575 Kh-55SM cruise missiles. An agreement was reached and a US$285 million contract was signed, the value of which was deducted from Ukraine's debt for natural gas. On 20 October 1999, a group of Russian military experts went to Ukraine to prepare the aircraft for the flight to Engels-2 air base. On 5 November, the first two aircraft, a Tu-160 and a Tu-95MS, departed Pryluky. During the following months, the rest were flown to Engels-2.

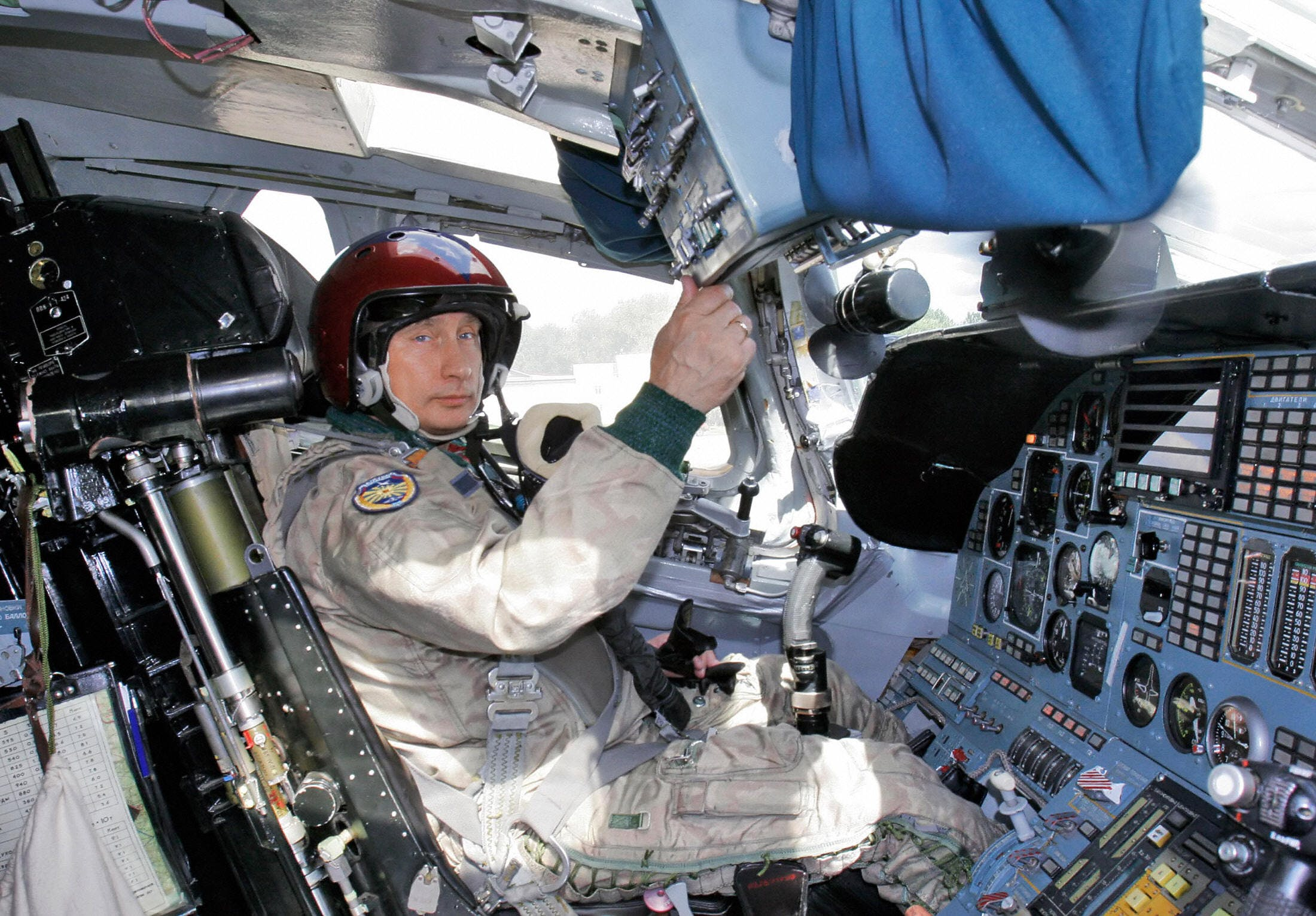
Russian President Vladimir Putin inside the cockpit of a Tu-160 in August 2005

Alongside buying Ukrainian Tu-160s, Russia pursued other means of expanding its fleet. In June 1999, the Russian Defence Ministry and KAPO signed a contract for the delivery of a single near-complete bomber. Named Aleksandr Molodchiy, it was the second aircraft in the eighth production batch. It arrived at Engels-2 on 10 September and was commissioned into service on 5 May 2000. The unit operating the fleet from Engels-2 was the 121st Guards Heavy Bomber Regiment, which was formed up in early 1992 and received six aircraft by 1994. By the end of February 2001, the fleet stood at 15 with the addition of the eight Ukrainian Tu-160s and the new-build. The fleet was reduced to 14 due to the crash of the Mikhail Gromov during flight trials of a replacement engine on 18 September 2003. On 5 July 2006, a Tu-160 named Valentin Bliznyuk, named after the Tu-160's chief designer, entered service with the Russian Air Force after completing its overhaul, bringing the total number back to 15. Built in 1986, it was formerly used as a test aircraft by Tupolev.

On 22 April 2006, the commander of the Long-Range Aviation Lieutenant General Igor Khvorov reported a pair of Tu-160s flew undetected through a US-controlled sector during a military exercise in the Arctic.

On 17 August 2007, Russian President Vladimir Putin announced the resumption of strategic aviation flights, which had been suspended in 1991. On 14 September 2007, British and Norwegian fighters intercepted two Tu-160s in international airspace near the United Kingdom and Finland, as they were patrolling the North Atlantic. On 25 December 2007, two Danish Air Force F-16s were scrambled to intercept two Tu-160s near Danish airspace.

On 11 September 2007, according to Russian government sources, a Tu-160 deployed a massive fuel-air explosive device, called Father of All Bombs, for its first field test. Some US military analysts expressed skepticism that the weapon had been delivered by a Tu-160.

On 29 April 2008, a new Tu-160 named Vitaly Kopylov joined the Russian Air Force, increasing the total number of aircraft in service to 16. In early 2008, Tu-160s took part in an exercise with the Russian Navy in the Atlantic Ocean.

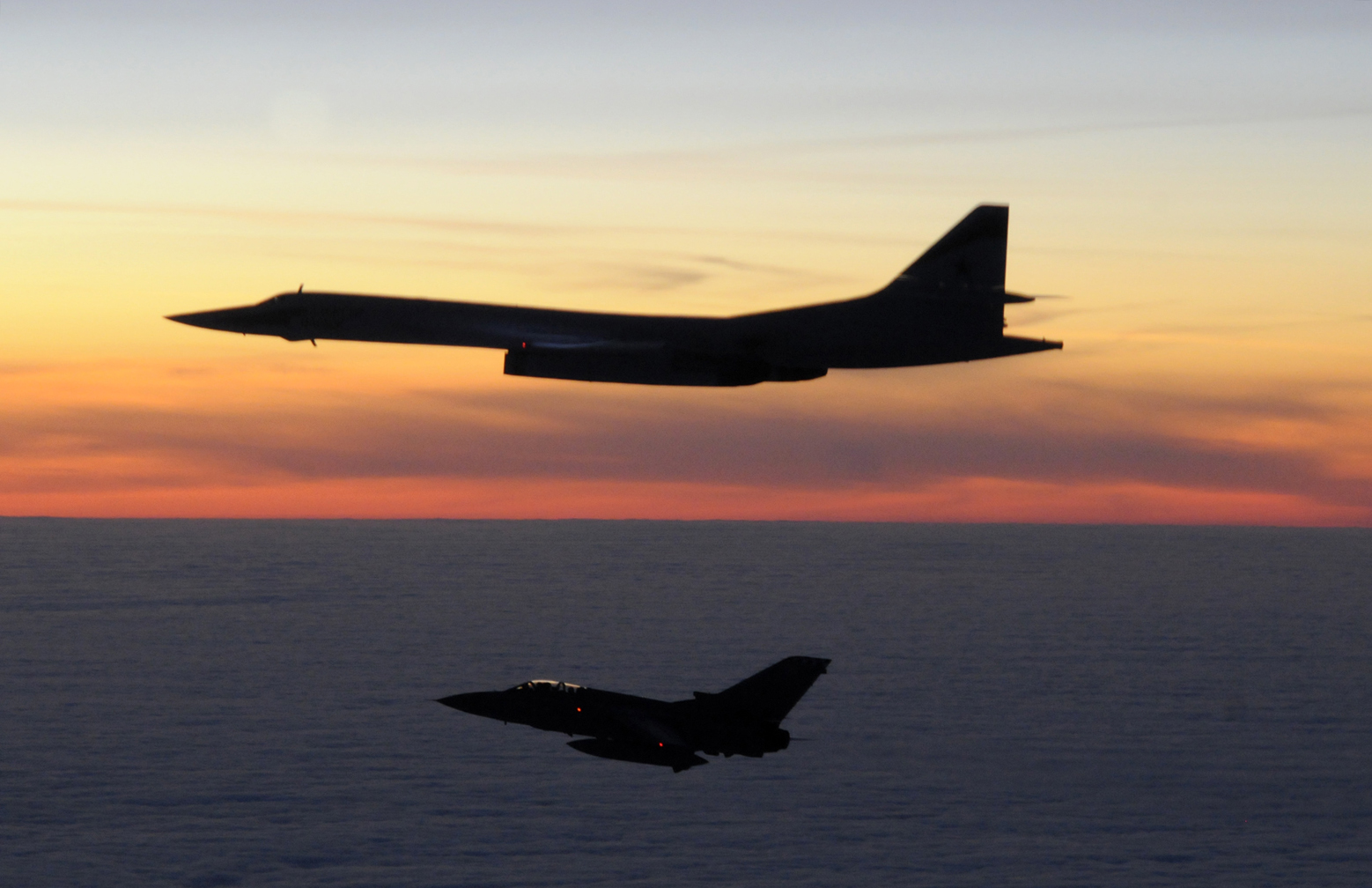
A Tu-160 is intercepted by an RAF Tornado F3 in March 2010

On 10 September 2008, two Tu-160s made an unprecedented deployment to Russia's ally Venezuela as part of military manoeuvres amid increasingly tense relations between Russia and the United States. The Russian Defence Ministry said Vasily Senko and Aleksandr Molodchiy would conduct training flights over neutral waters before returning to Russia. They were escorted by NATO fighters as they crossed the Atlantic Ocean.

On 12 October 2008, Tu-160s were involved in the largest Russian strategic bomber exercise since 1984. A total of 12 bombers, including Tu-160 and Tu-95 aircraft conducted a series of launches of their cruise missiles. Some bombers launched a full complement of missiles; it was the first time that a Tu-160 had ever fired a full complement of missiles.

On 10 June 2010, two Tu-160s carried out a record-breaking 23-hour patrol with a planned flight range of 18,000 km (9,700 nmi), having flown along Russia's borders and over neutral waters in the Arctic and Pacific Oceans.

In August 2011, Russian media claimed that only four of the 16 Tu-160s were flightworthy. Flight International reported eleven were combat-ready by mid-2012; between 2011 and 2013, eleven were observed in flight.

On 1 November 2013, Aleksandr Golovanov and Aleksandr Novikov entered Colombian airspace on two separate occasions while flying from Venezuela to Nicaragua. Noting a lack of clearance, the Colombian government issued a letter of protest to the Russian government after the first violation. In the second violation, two Colombian Air Force IAI Kfirs stationed at Barranquilla intercepted and escorted the two Tu-160s out of Colombian airspace.

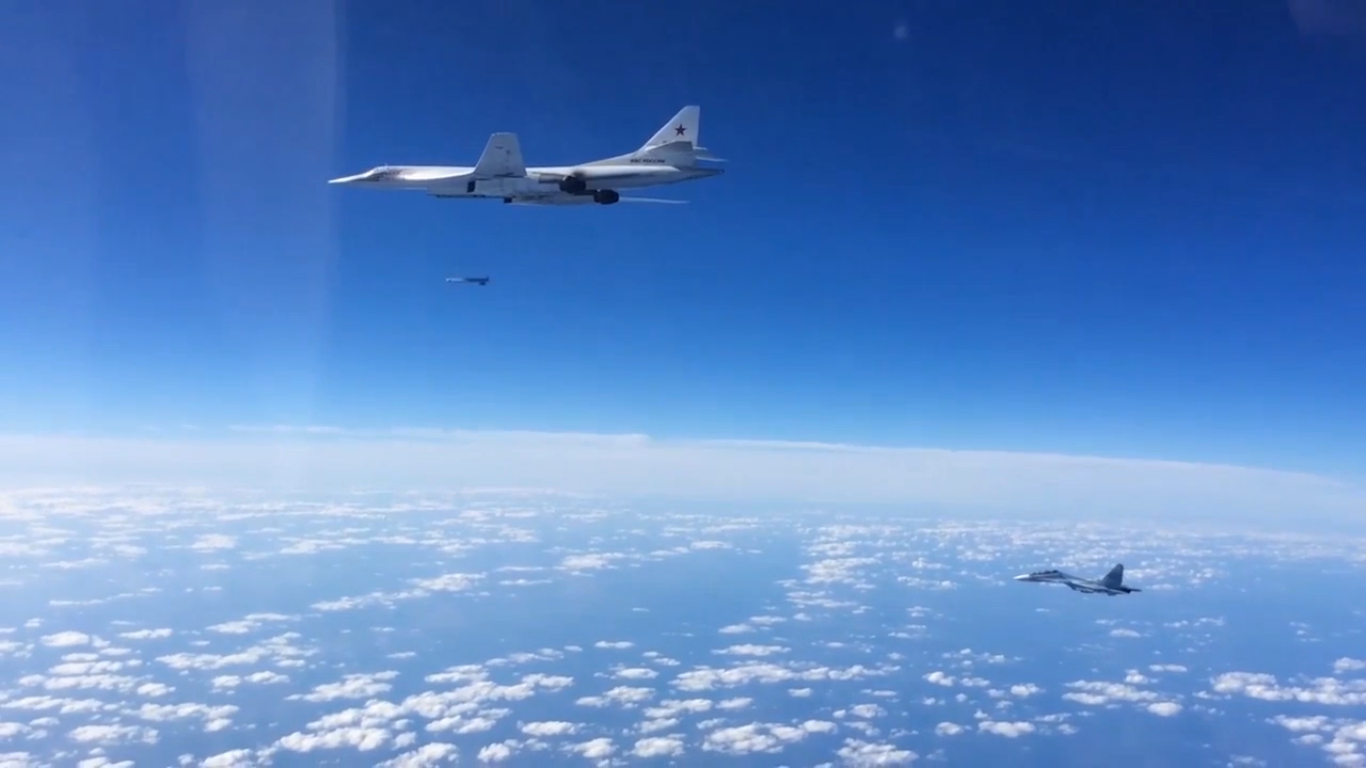
A Tu-160 launching a Kh-101 cruise missile at targets in Syria, November 2015.

On 17 November 2015, as part of the Russian military intervention in the Syrian Civil War, several Tu-160 and Tu-95MS strategic bombers of the Russian Aerospace Forces fired Kh-101 air-launched cruise missiles from above the Mediterranean Sea, striking targets in Idlib and Aleppo provinces. In total, between 34 and 83 cruise missiles were fired, destroying 14 targets. In addition, Tu-22M3 strategic bombers hit numerous claimed Islamic State targets with unguided munitions. This operation also marked the combat debut for the Tu-160 and Tu-95MS.

In August 2018, several Russian military aircraft including two Tu-160, Tu-95MS strategic bombers and Il-78 aerial tankers were deployed for the first time to the Russian Far East as part of a long-range tactical flight exercise, flying 7,000 km non-stop flight from their home base in Saratov Oblast to Chukotka. During the exercise, the crews practised the combat use of cruise missiles at the Komi Test Range and performed aerial refueling.

In November 2018, a modernized Tu-160M test-fired a full complement of 12 Kh-101 cruise missiles at the Pemboy proving ground in the northeastern region of Komi Republic.

On 10 December 2018, two Tu-160s accompanied by an An-124 cargo plane and an Il-62 passenger plane, landed at the Maiquetía airport in Venezuela. On 23 October 2019, two Tu-160s accompanied by an An-124 and an Il-62 visited South Africa as part of strengthening ties between the two nations; the aircraft performed a 13 hours non-stop flight over the Caspian Sea, Arabian Sea, and Indian Ocean, covering 11,000 km (6,800 mi) with mid-air refueling and landed at Waterkloof Air Force Base in South Africa. It was the Tu-160's first visit to the African continent.

On 11 November 2021, the Belarusian Defense Ministry announced that two Russian Tu-160s flew on a training mission over Belarus alongside Belarusian Air Force Sukhoi Su-30s.

The type was involved in the Russian invasion of Ukraine. According to Ukrainian sources, on 6 March 2022, a Tu-160 along with a Tu-95MS strategic bomber launched eight cruise missiles, presumably the Kh-101, at the Havryshivka Vinnytsia International Airport from the Black Sea area. On 26 June 2022, Ukrainian Air Force spokesman Yurii Ihnat reported four to six Kh-101 cruise missiles were launched by Tu-160 and Tu-95MS bombers at Kyiv from the Caspian Sea area.

On 20 January 2025, Ukraine launched a drone attack on the Gorbunov Kazan Aviation Plant in Kazan, Russia where the Tu-160 is built, about 1,000 km (620 mi) from the border with Ukraine, causing several explosions. Russian sources stated that damage was minimal and all drone threats had been neutralized.

On 1 June, Ukraine claimed that Operation Spiderweb hit four Tu-160s at airfields inside Russia with swarms of small drones.

=== Potential operators ===
In 2022, retired Air Chief Marshal Anoop Raha said India was interested in purchasing Tu-160s. Reports emerged in late 2022 that India was in talks with Russia to acquire six Tu-160s that could make India the only country other than US, Russia and China to have operational strategic bombers.

== Variants ==
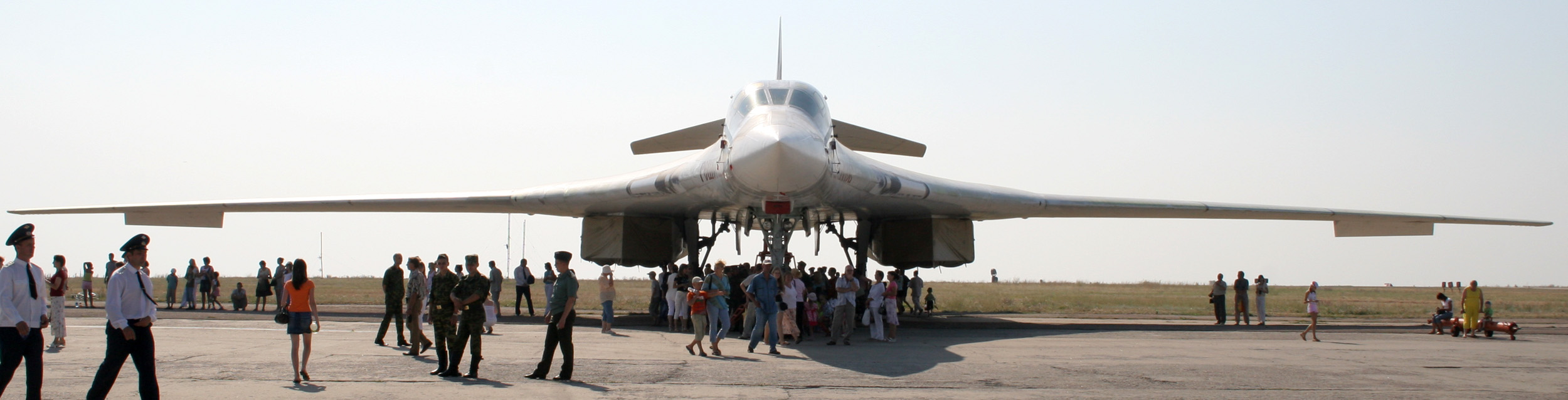
Tu-160 "Vasily Reshetnikov" at the Engels-2 air base

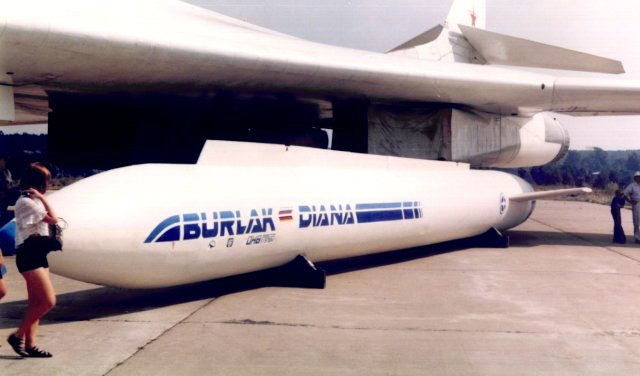
Tu-160 with Burlak launch vehicle

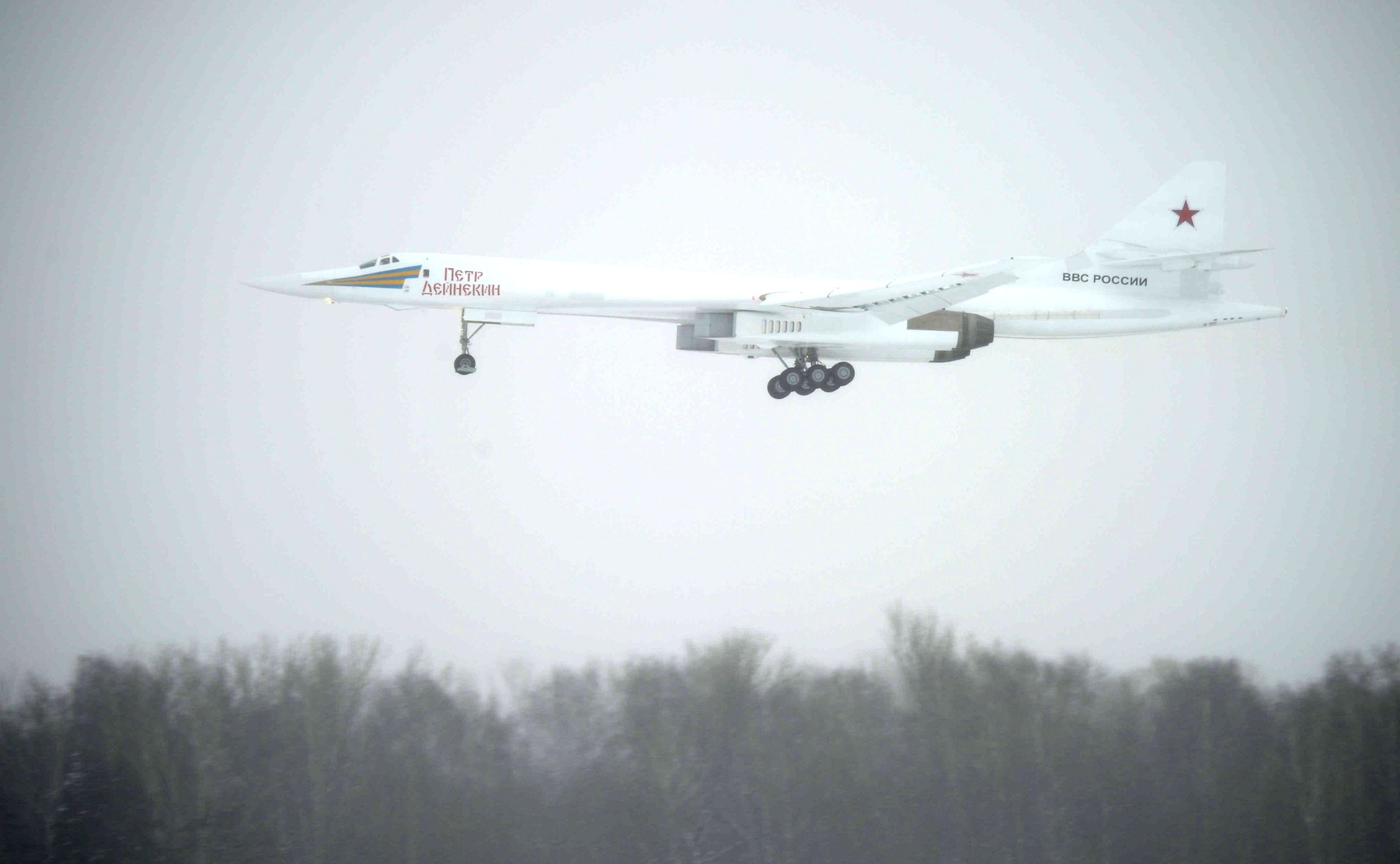
Tu-160M "Pyotr Deynekin" at Kazan in 2018

Tu-160
Production version.
Tu-160S
Designation used for serial Tu-160s when needed to separate them from all the pre-production and experimental aircraft.
Tu-160V
Proposed liquid hydrogen fueled version (see also Tu-155).
Tu-160 NK-74
Proposed upgraded (extended range) version with NK-74 engines.
Tu-160M
Upgraded version that features new weaponry, improved electronics and avionics.
Tu-160P (Tu-161)
Proposed very long-range escort fighter/interceptor version.
Tu-160PP
Proposed electronic warfare version carrying stand-off jamming and ECM gear (Russian: ПП – постановщик помех "jamming").
Tu-160R
Proposed strategic reconnaissance version.
Tu-160SK
Proposed commercial version, designed to launch satellites via the "Burlak" (Russian: Бурлак, "hauler") launch system.
Tu-160M2
Highly upgraded version featuring, new avionics, electronics, glass cockpit, communications and control systems, and a number of new weapons, as well as new more powerful and efficient engines giving it greater operational range. It will also have a new defensive system to protect it from incoming missiles. The first plane was to be ready by late 2021. There has been some discussion about whether radar absorptive materials have been applied, but most sources confine its upgrades to electronic warfare and enhanced range/avionics.

== Operators ==
=== Current operators ===
Russia

- Russian Aerospace Forces – 18 Tu-160/M operational, of which 5 Tu-160 in repair and modernization. There are a further 2 Tu-160M under construction. According to Newsweek, 2 Tu-160M and 2 Tu-160M2 have been commissioned as of July 2025.
  - 6950th Guards Air Base – Engels-2 air base, Saratov Oblast
    - 121st Guards Heavy Bomber Aviation Regiment

=== Former operators ===
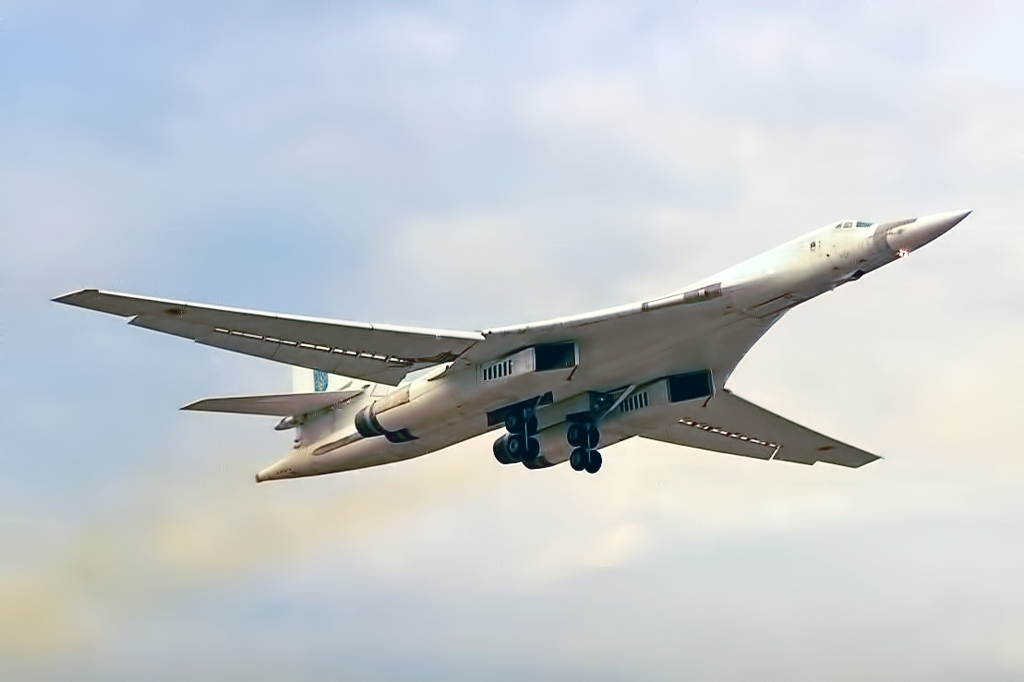
Ukrainian Air Force Tu-160, 1997

Soviet Union

- Soviet Air Forces Long Range Aviation – aircraft were transferred to the Russian and Ukrainian Air Forces after the dissolution of the Soviet Union.
  - 201st Heavy Bomber Aviation Division – Pryluky Air Base, Chernihiv Oblast, Ukrainian SSR
    - 184th Guards Heavy Bomber Aviation Regiment (GvTBAP)

Ukraine

- Ukrainian Air Force – inherited 19 Tu-160s from the former Soviet Union, and subsequently handed over 8 Tu-160s to Russia as exchange for gas debt relief in 1999; the remainder were scrapped under the Nunn–Lugar Cooperative Threat Reduction agreement led by the US.
  - 201st Heavy Bomber Aviation Division – Pryluky Air Base, Chernihiv Oblast, Ukraine
    - 184th Guards Heavy Bomber Aviation Regiment (GvTBAP)
- 1 Tu-160 in the Poltava Museum of Long-Range and Strategic Aviation

== Specifications (Tu-160) ==
Orthographic projection of the Tupolev Tu-160

Data from Jane's All the World's Aircraft 2003–2004

General characteristics

- Crew: 4 (pilot, co-pilot, bombardier, defensive systems officer)
- Length: 54.1 m (177 ft 6 in)
- Wingspan: 55.7 m (182 ft 9 in) wings spread (20°)

35.6 m (117 ft) wings swept (65°)

- Height: 13.1 m (43 ft 0 in)
- Wing area: 400 m^{2} (4,300 sq ft) wings spread

360 m^{2} (3,875 sq ft) wings swept

- Empty weight: 110,000 kg (242,508 lb)
- Gross weight: 267,600 kg (589,957 lb)
- Max takeoff weight: 275,000 kg (606,271 lb)
- Powerplant: 4 × Samara NK-321 afterburning turbofan engines, 137.3 kN (30,900 lbf) thrust each dry, 245 kN (55,000 lbf) with afterburner

Performance

- Maximum speed: 2,220 km/h (1,380 mph, 1,200 kn) at 12,200 m (40,000 ft)
- Maximum speed: Mach 2.05
- Cruise speed: 960 km/h (600 mph, 520 kn) / M0.9
- Range: 12,300 km (7,600 mi, 6,600 nmi) practical range without in-flight refuelling, Mach 0.77 and carrying 6 × Kh-55SM dropped at mid range and 5% fuel reserves
- Combat range: 2,000 km (1,200 mi, 1,100 nmi) at Mach 1.5; or 7,300 km (4,536 mi) at subsonic speeds
- Service ceiling: 16,000 m (52,000 ft)
- Rate of climb: 70 m/s (14,000 ft/min)
- Lift-to-drag: 18.5–19, while supersonic it is above 6
- Wing loading: 742 kg/m^{2} (152 lb/sq ft) with wings fully swept
- Thrust/weight: 0.37

Armament

- Two internal weapon bays for 45,000 kg (99,208 lb) of ordnance.

- Two internal rotary launchers each holding 6 × Raduga Kh-55SM/101/102/555/BD cruise missiles (primary armament) or 12 × Raduga Kh-15 short-range nuclear missiles.

== See also ==
- Tupolev PAK DA
- Tupolev Tu-134UBL, used for Tu-160 pilot training

Aircraft of comparable role, configuration, and era

- Sukhoi T-4
- Rockwell B-1 Lancer
- Xi'an H-6K
- Tupolev Tu-22M

Related lists

- List of military aircraft of the Soviet Union and the CIS
- List of bomber aircraft
