= Khalmer-Yu (disambiguation) =

Khalmer-Yu is a ghost town in Komi Republic, Russia.

Khalmer-Yu, Khalmer'yu, or Khalmeryu may also refer to:

- Khalmer'yu River, Komi
- Khalmer'yu River, Khanty-Mansi
- Khalmer'yu River, Nenets

== See also ==
- Khalmer'ya River, Komi
