= Ochenyrd =

Mountaiil range of Arctic Ural mountains

Coordinates: 68°3′40″N 65°41′9″E

Ochenyrd (Russian: Оченырд) is a mountain range on the western slope of Polar Urals within the Yamalo-Nenets Autonomous Okrug, Russia, near the border with Komi Republic. It stretches from northeast to southwest for 20 km near the right bank of the upper reaches of Kara River. Its highest point is Mount Netempe (Нэтемпэ), 1,363m. The name appears to be a neologism, probably introduced after World War II. The 19-th century Russian geologist Ernst Reinhold von Hofmann the range was marked as Гнетъю-Пае, Нетъю-Пае (here "Гн" ('gn') is used to denote the nasal consonant similar to "eng", probably ӈ). A 19th century map of Antal Reguly marks it as "Gnettju".

Up to the elevation of 350-450m the slopes are tundra and higher parts are rocks. The slopes are eroded, with glaciers in its ravines (cirques). There is the Ochety (Очеты) lake by its northeartern termination. 30km to the west-southwest of another peak, Gnet'yuiz (1,055m) there is the ghost town of Khalmer-Yu, from which a tundra road in the direction of the range is still preserved.
