= Tupolev PAK DA =

Russian stealth strategic bomber under development

General information
- Type: Stealth strategic bomber
- National origin: Russia
- Manufacturer: Kazan Aircraft Production Association, Novosibirsk Aircraft Production Association Plant, Beriev
- Designer: Tupolev
- Status: In development
- Primary user: Russian Aerospace Forces

History
- Introduction date: 2027 (expected)

The Tupolev PAK DA or PAK DA (Russian: ПАК ДА, short for: Перспективный авиационный комплекс дальней авиации, romanized: Perspektivnyi aviatsionnyi kompleks dal'ney aviatsii, lit. ''Prospective aviation complex for long-range aviation''), codename Poslannik (Russian: Посланник, lit. 'Envoy'), is a next-generation stealth strategic bomber being developed by Tupolev for the Long-Range Aviation branch of the Russian Aerospace Forces. The PAK DA is set to complement and eventually replace the older Tupolev Tu-95 in Russia's Air Force service.

According to the 2020 Izvestia report, three PAK DA prototypes were expected to be ready for preliminary testing by April 2023, with the state tests to begin in February 2026. The aircraft is expected to enter serial production in 2027. Due to the ongoing modernization of Russia's current bomber fleet and massive purchases of upgraded Tu-160M2s, it is believed that the Russian Defence Ministry will initially procure only a small number of PAK DA bombers.

Technical parameters of the PAK DA include subsonic speed, 12,000-kilometre (7,500 mi) operational range and a capability to continuously remain in the air for up to 30 hours while carrying both conventional and nuclear payloads up to 30 tons. The aircraft is expected to have a crew of four.

== Development ==
The first mention of Russia's next-generation long-range strategic bomber dates back to the late 1990s when the formation of requirements for the aircraft had begun. In December 2007, the Russian Air Force handed to Tupolev Design Bureau the first set of technical and tactical requirements for a new strategic bomber and financing of the programme began in 2008. According to some early reports, the PAK DA was to be heavily based on the supersonic Tupolev Tu-160, but later reports regarding to the aircraft, including a televised address from then-Prime Minister Vladimir Putin, seemed to imply that it will be an entirely new design.

On 3 September 2009, the Russian Defence Ministry awarded Tupolev Design Bureau a three-year R&D contract to undertake studies for the new long-range bomber. According to the President-General Designer of Tupolev, Igor Shevchuk, "this should be a fundamentally new aircraft, based on conceptually new solutions".

In June 2012, then-Deputy Prime Minister Dmitry Rogozin questioned the need for a new long-range bomber, pointing out the progress in aerial and anti-missile defence technology, saying "these aircraft will not get anywhere. Not ours, not theirs." The Chief of the General Staff Nikolai Makarov, responded by stating that work is ongoing and that the design was superior to American aircraft. On 9 June 2012, Prime Minister Dmitry Medvedev stated that the PAK DA was confirmed as planned. Russian President Vladimir Putin in his statement on 14 June 2012 also urged the need for a new long-range bomber.

In March 2013, it was reported that the selected PAK DA design would be a subsonic flying wing with emphasis on stealth technology rather than supersonic speeds. Anatoly Zhikharev noted that an unmanned strategic bomber may follow the PAK DA after 2040. On 30 August 2013, a Russian Defense Ministry source revealed that the PAK DA will be equipped with advanced types of precision-guided weapons, including hypersonic weapons.

In November 2013, a decision was taken to speed up work on the PAK DA and begin full-scale R&D work in 2014. In February 2014, then-Deputy Minister of Industry and Trade Andrey Boginsky stated that Russia was seeking Chinese investment in the project.

In April 2014, head of Russia's United Aircraft Corporation (UAC) Mikhail Pogosyan announced that the Tupolev Design Bureau had finalized the design and that the project was moving to the intermediate phase - i.e. completion of the design and construction of a prototype.

In March 2015, it became known that the KAPO plant in Kazan was chosen for the construction of the PAK DA prototypes and serial aircraft. The Russian Defence Ministry allocated about RUB5 billion for reconstruction and technical re-equipment of the production base, to prepare the plant for the construction of the new bomber. Development of the PAK DA will be carried out simultaneously with serial production of the upgraded Tu-160M2, although this later led to repeated delays in the programme.

In July 2015, representatives from the United Instrument Manufacturing Corporation (UIMC), now part of Roselectronics, announced the company is developing "one-of-a-kind communications system" for the bomber.

On 1 March 2017, it was reported that the first full-size model of the bomber was built, amongst various scale mock-ups of different configurations.

In July 2018, United Engine Corporation (UEC) and Tupolev signed a contract for the creation of PAK DA's powerplant. According to early reports, it will be derived from the upgraded Kuznetsov NK-32 Tier 2 engine, intended for modernized Tu-160M2s. About RUB8 billion was to be allocated for the development of the new engine that will be produced by JSC Kuznetsov in Samara. The engine is to provide the PAK DA with a capability to perform 30 hours nonstop flight while being resistant to temperatures from minus 60°C to plus 50°C and even effects of a nuclear explosion. Its service life is expected to be from 12 to 21 years. The first tests of the PAK DA engine will take place in 2020 and be completed by the end of 2021.

In February 2019, PAK DA's final draft was approved and all documents for the construction of the bomber were signed. Construction of the first aircraft components began in late 2019. On 26 May 2020, the beginning of construction of the first PAK DA bomber was reported by TASS with reference to anonymous sources. Still according to TASS, citing another source in the aircraft industry, the first prototype of the PAK DA will be finished in early 2023.

On 23 December 2020, it was reported that UEC was in the final stages of completing the first prototype engine for the PAK DA, with bench tests to be carried out in 2021. The new engine was designed digitally, which made it possible to quickly manufacture the first sample. On 24 December 2020, according to a TASS source in the Russian military-industrial complex, it was reported that there were now several PAK DA being assembled at the same time at the Kazan aircraft plant. The source said that two or three prototypes are already being launched into production.

On 22 July 2021, the general director of NPP Zvezda announced at the 2021 MAKS air show that the ejection seats for the PAK DA were under development and should be handed over to Tupolev in 2023. The testing phase of the PAK DA's ejection seat started in October 2022, according to the general director of NPP Zvezda. On 2 August 2021, it was announced that a new long-range nuclear-capable hypersonic cruise missile, the Kh-95, was under development, to be fitted inside the PAK DA's weapon bay. On 25 November 2021, it was reported that the first PAK DA prototype was in final stage of assembly and would start ground tests in 2022, with the first flight scheduled for late 2024 or early 2025.

On 16 March 2022, Tupolev published a patent for an engine air intake for stealthy flying wing aircraft, including illustrations of such an aircraft.

On 13 May 2022, a production planning of United Aircraft Corporation at the Voronezh Aircraft Production Association plant showed that the production of components for 6 PAK DA was ongoing. The planning also confirmed that several PAK DA prototypes were still expected to be built between 2023 and 2026. Work on the schedule was further warranted by Russian Deputy Prime Minister Denis Manturov, explaining that the sanctions following the 2022 Russian invasion of Ukraine would not affect the timing of the creation of the PAK DA as the bomber does not contain any foreign components. Similarly, on 10 August 2023, the eve of the "Army-2023" International Military-Technical Forum, Vladimir Artyakov, First Deputy General Director of Rostec claimed that "work on the PAK DA project is carried out in the mode established by the approved schedule," meaning that the first prototype should thenceforth be rolled-out in 2023. As of June 2025, there were no reports of a prototype being completed.

== See also ==
Aircraft of comparable role, configuration, and era

- Northrop Grumman B-21 Raider
- Northrop Grumman B-2 Spirit
- Xian H-20

Related lists

- List of bomber aircraft
