= Kazanka (boat) =

Motorboat

Class overview
- Builders: Kazan Shipyard

General characteristics
- Type: Motorboat
- Length: 4.63 metres
- Propulsion: Propeller

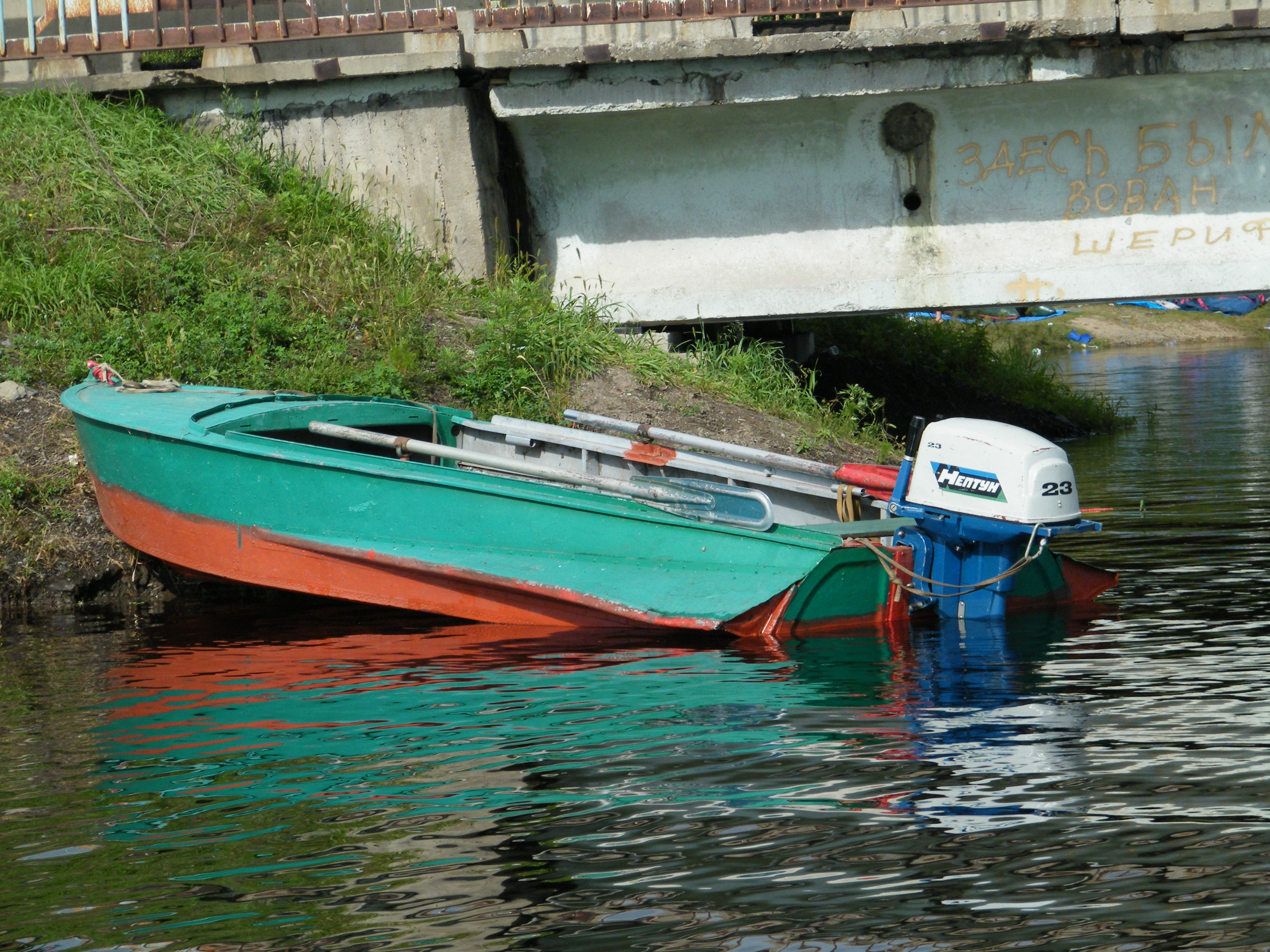
Kazanka boat with a Neptun-23 outboard motor

Kazanka refers to one of several models of small riveted duralumin motorboat once produced by the Gorbunov airplane factory (Авиационное ПО им. С. П. Горбунова) in Kazan. Production at the Gorbunov factory started in 1955, with the original Kazanka motorboat. Later models included the Kazanka-2, Kazanka-5, and Kazanka-M. It was the first small boat to be sold commercially in the Soviet Union and they are now found on lakes and rivers all over Russia. Until 1978, a total of 200,000 boats were produced.

The class is named for the Kazanka River, which empties into the Volga at Kazan. Their length is 4.63 metres, width 1.60 metres, dry weight 145 kg, and payload 400 kg.

Kazanka motorboats are currently produced in Kazan by the Kazan Shipyard (Казанский судостроительный завод).
