= Kazan Aircraft Production Association =

Russian aircraft manufacturer and aviation services company

Coordinates: 55°51′42.54″N 49°6′56.97″E

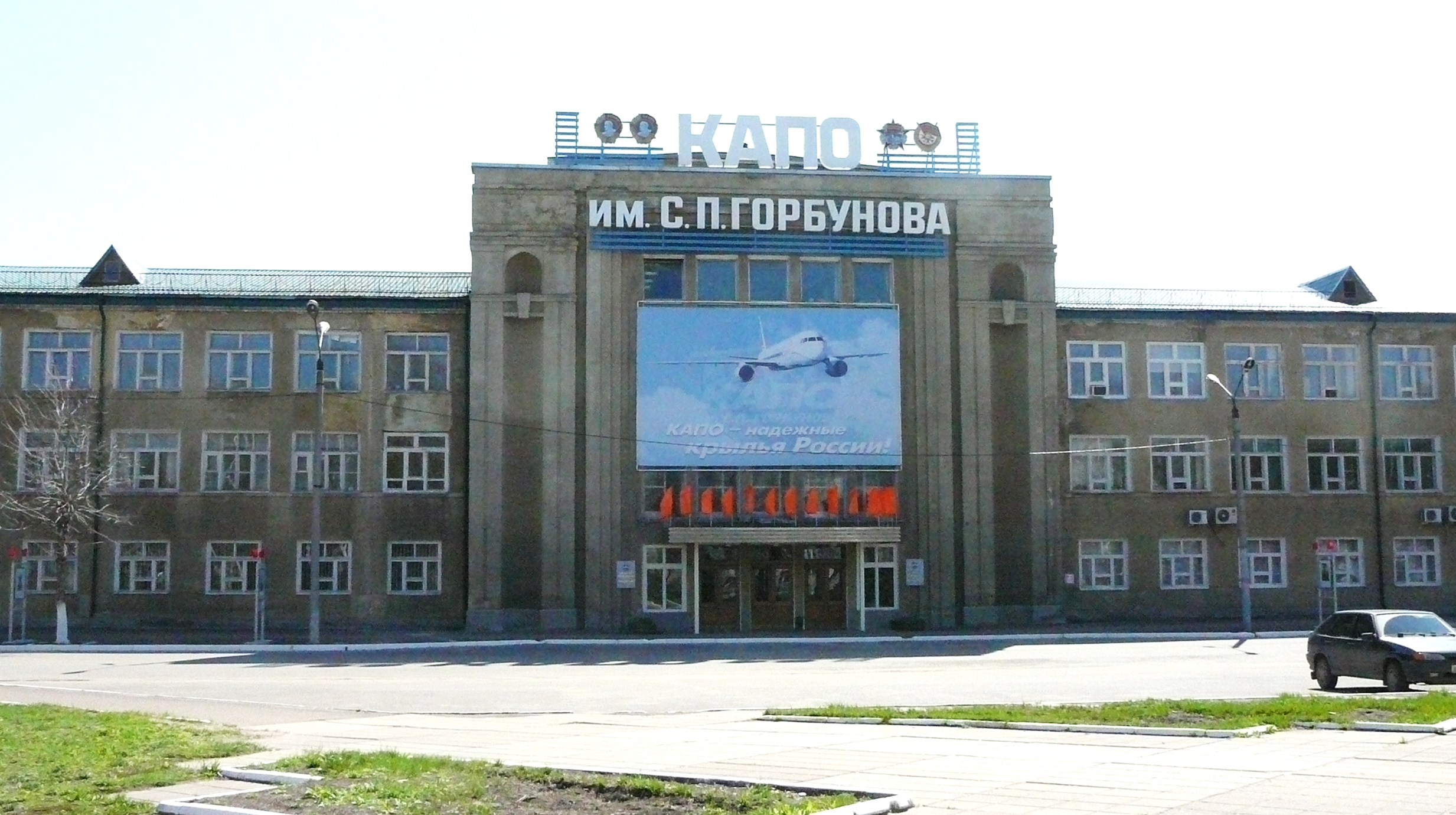
- Industry: Aviation
- Founded: 1927; 99 years ago
- Headquarters: Kazan,
- Products: Commercial and military aircraft
- Parent: Tupolev (United Aircraft Corporation)
- Website: www.tupolev.ru/en/

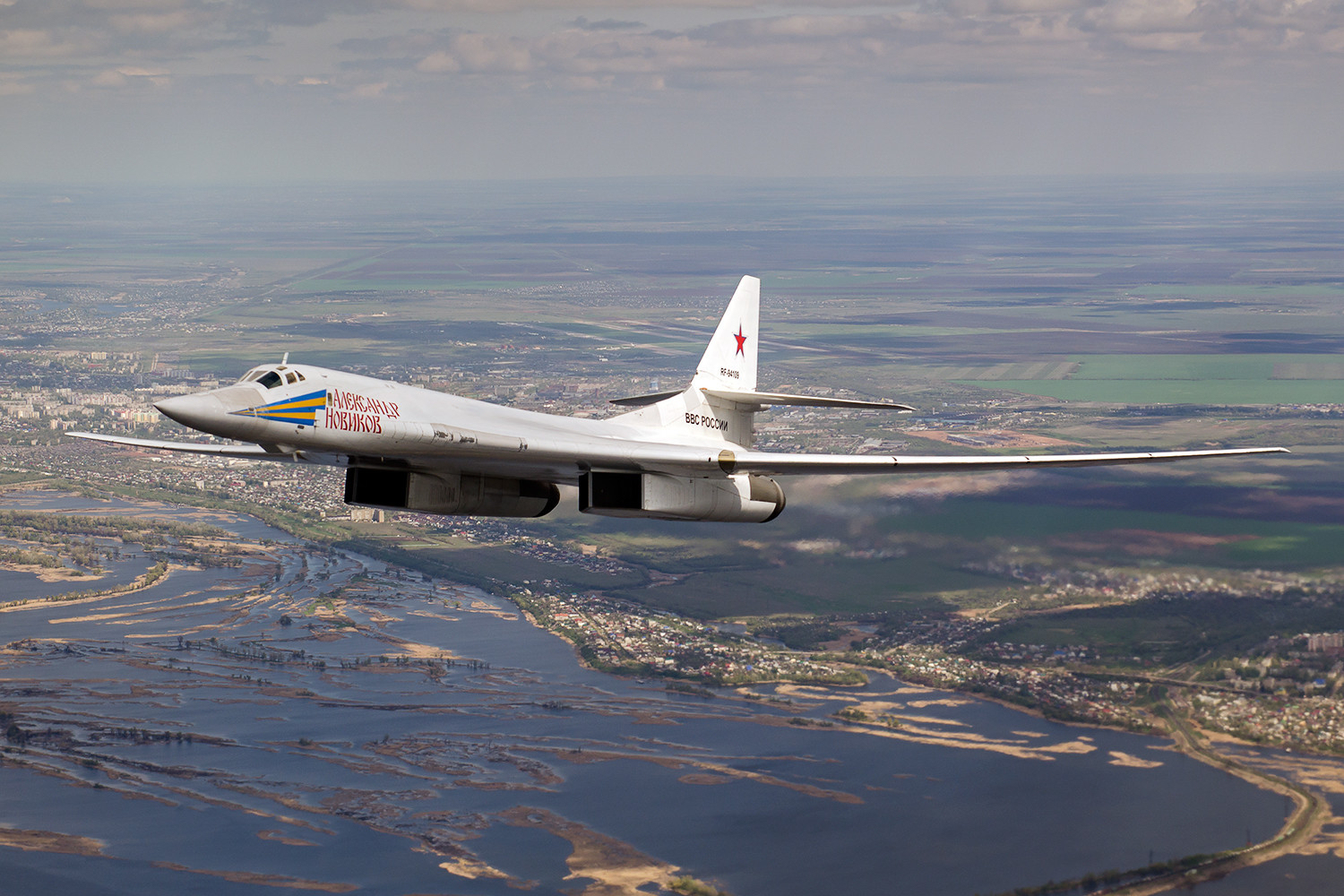
Strategic bomber Tupolev Tu-160 built by KAPO

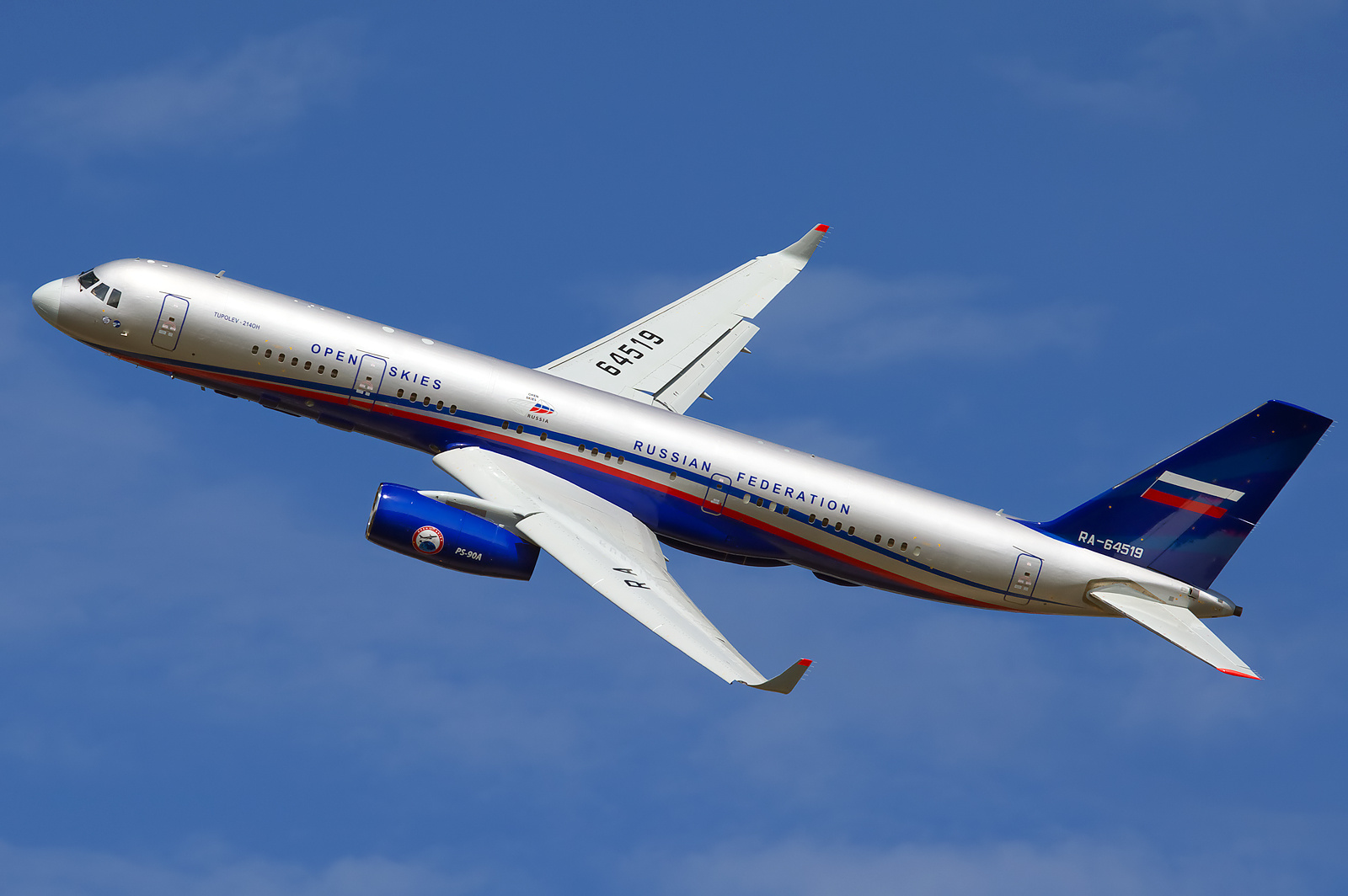
Airliner Tupolev Tu-214 built by KAPO

Kazan Aircraft Production Association (KAPO; Russian: Казанское авиационное производственное объединение имени С. П. Горбунова, romanized: Kazanskoye Aviatsionnoe Proizvodstvennoe Obyedinenie imeni S.P. Gorbunova, Tatar: С.П. Горбунов исемендәге Казан авиация заводы, romanized: S. P. Gorbunov isemendäge Kazan aviatsiya zavody) is an aircraft manufacturer based in Kazan, Russia. It has built more than 18,000 aircraft of 34 types during its history.

== History ==
The company traces its origins to the Fili plant of the Russo-Balt corporation, which was established as an automobile production plant in April 1916. In November 1922, the Soviet Union signed a joint venture agreement with the German aircraft manufacturer Junkers, and the Fili facility was renamed State Aircraft Factory (GAZ) No. 7. The Fili site later became the Khrunichev Space Center.

As relations with the German government worsened, the plant was taken over by the Soviets and in 1927 it was renamed Zavod No. 22 Ten Years October Plant, and later it was named after S.P. Gorbunov. In 1941 the plant was evacuated to Kazan, and in 1946 it absorbed the Heinkel facility from Oelsnitz.

KAPO currently produces Tu-214 passenger planes and Tu-160 strategic bombers. Prior to their cancellation, there were plans to produce Tu-334 regional airliners and Tu-330 freighters.

According to a 2010 article, after KAPO has upgraded the current Russian bomber fleet (see Tupolev Tu-160) it will start production of a "new-generation strategic bomber", the PAK DA.

== Current operation ==
Kazan Aviation Plant named after S. P. Gorbunov cooperates with more than 600 foreign and domestic enterprises. It produces from 1 to 3 Tu-214 aircraft per year, as well as repairs of Tu-160 aircraft. Since April 2015 production of the Tu-160 has been resumed, on behalf of the Minister of Defense of the Russian Federation.

Tests of all aircraft manufactured and repaired at the enterprise are carried out at the Borisoglebskoye factory airfield. On November 18, 2016 PJSC Tupolev concluded a contract with JSC Kazan Giproniiaviaprom for the reconstruction and technical re-equipment of pre-production workshops at the Kazan Aviation Plant named after S. P. Gorbunov worth 1.8 billion rubles, according to the procurement documentation of PJSC. According to the documentation, the project includes the reconstruction and technical re-equipment of engineering systems of networks and premises of four workshops of the aircraft factory and the site for the manufacture of large-sized parts, the purchase of technological equipment and commissioning. The deadline for completing the work is no more than 396 calendar days. As reported, Tupolev previously also selected Kazansky Giproniiaviaprom JSC as a contractor for the development of design estimates and working documentation for the reconstruction and technical re-equipment of the production of aggregate and final assembly, mechanical assembly, as well as welded assemblies and assemblies. The total amount of these contracts amounted to 342 million rubles. It was also reported that the government of Tatarstan and PJSC United Aircraft Corporation (UAC) signed an agreement on the modernization of the S. P. Gorbunov Kazan Aviation Plant — a branch of PJSC Tupolev, taking into account the production of the Tu-160M2 strategic bomber and in the future PAK DA. Investments are estimated at several tens of billions of rubles. The UAC noted that the investments calculated for 2016-2020 are comparable to the costs of starting production in Soviet times. About 40% of the equipment of the workshops of the main production facilities, including assembly, procurement and stamping, is subject to technical re-equipment.

The aircraft factory produces special modifications of the Tu-214: Tu-214SR (repeater aircraft), Tu-214PU (control room), Tu-214SUS (communications hub aircraft), Tu-214ON (aircraft surveillance aircraft), repairs and upgrades aircraft for long—range aviation of the Russian Aerospace Forces Tu-22M3 and Tu-160.

In the 2000s the company carried out capital repairs of ZiU-682B trolleybuses.

== Social infrastructure development ==
- To accelerate the pace of housing construction, a house-building plant was built under the KAPO.
- In 1974-1993 residential buildings with a total area of 360.1 thousand m2, an educational and course complex, a vocational school complex, a dispensary, kindergartens, a school, a pioneer camp, a recreation center, urban facilities, and more were built.

== See also ==
- Kazanka (boat)
