= Depression (geology) =

Landform sunken or depressed below the surrounding area

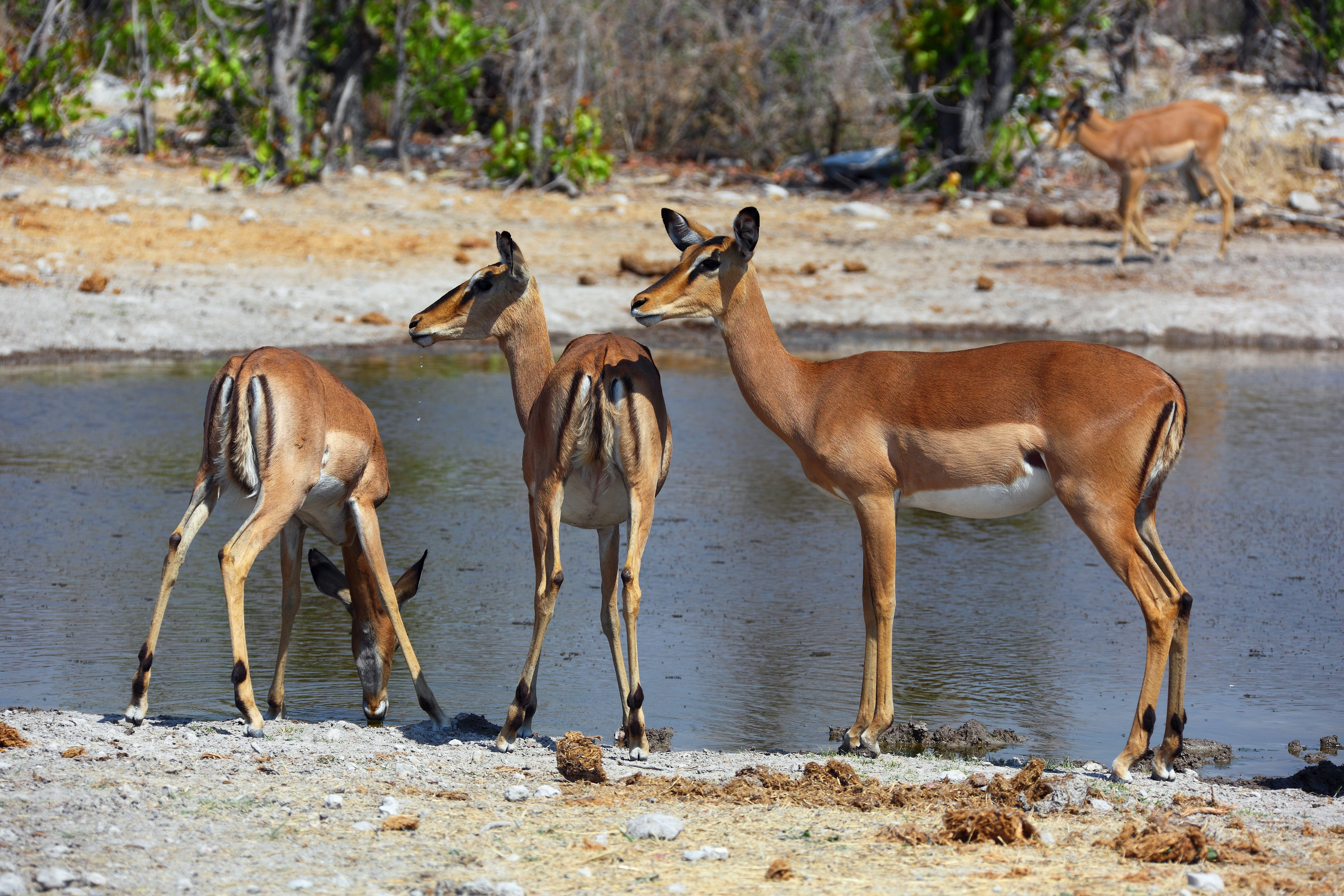
A watering hole is a natural depression where water collects and animals (such as these impala) come to drink.

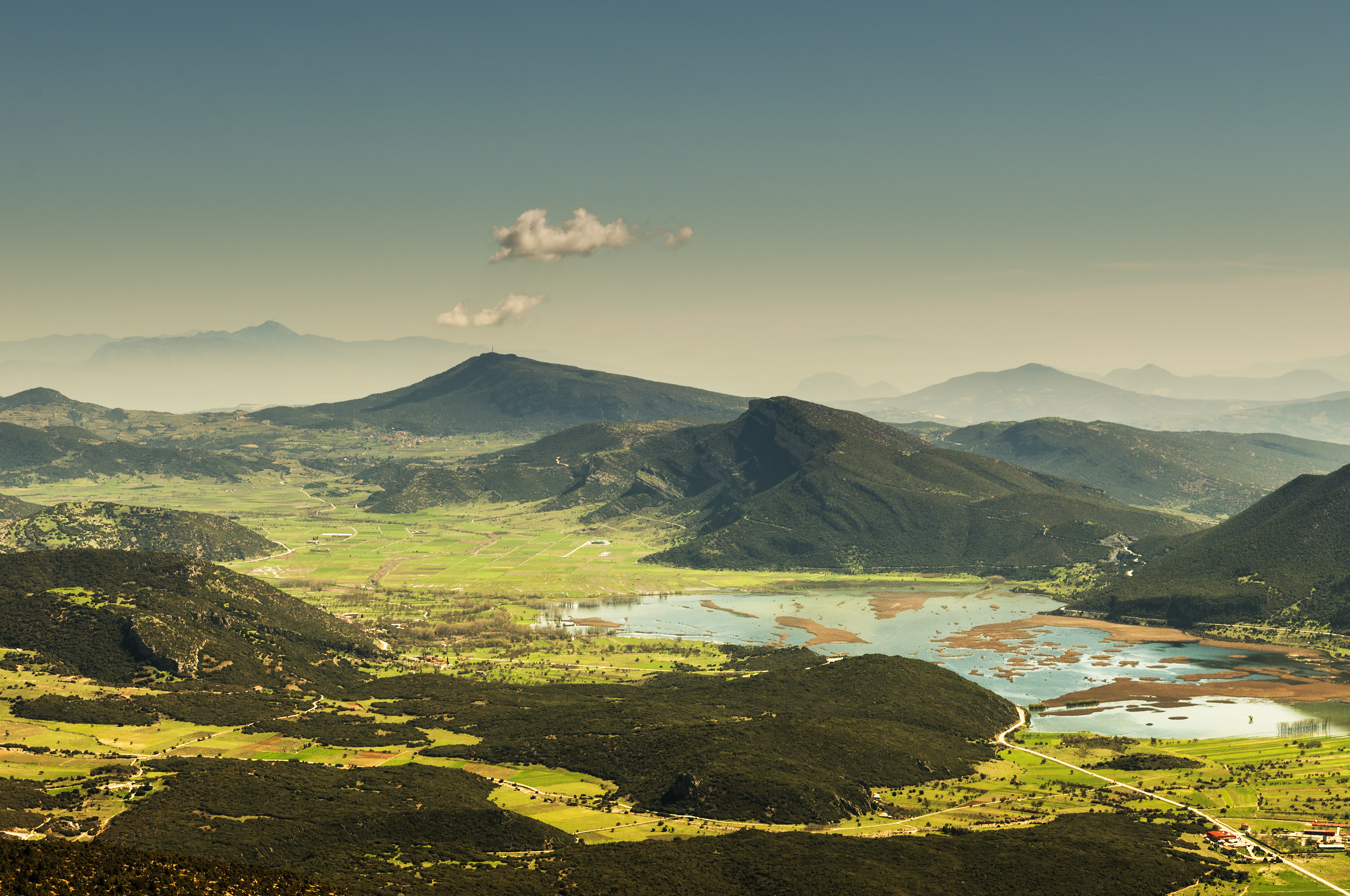
A karstic closed depression with the permanent lake Stymfalia, in Peloponnese, Greece. Seasonal abundant precipitation is drained by three sinkholes.

In geology, a depression is a landform sunken or depressed below the surrounding area. Depressions form by various mechanisms.

== Types ==
Erosion-related:

- Blowout: a depression created by wind erosion typically in either a partially vegetated sand dune ecosystem or dry soils (such as a post-glacial loess environment).
- Glacial valley: a depression carved by erosion by a glacier.
- River valley: a depression carved by fluvial erosion by a river.
- Area of subsidence caused by the collapse of an underlying structure, such as sinkholes in karst terrain.
- Sink: an endorheic depression generally containing a persistent or intermittent (seasonal) lake, a salt flat (playa) or dry lake, or an ephemeral lake.
- Panhole: a shallow depression or basin eroded into flat or gently sloping, cohesive rock.

Collapse-related:

- Sinkhole: a depression formed as a result of the collapse of rocks lying above a hollow. This is common in karst regions.
- Kettle: a shallow, sediment-filled body of water formed by melting glacial remnants in terminal moraines.
- Thermokarst hollow: caused by volume loss of the ground as the result of permafrost thawing.

Impact-related:

- Impact crater: a depression created by an impact, such as a meteorite crater.

Sedimentary-related:

- Sedimentary basin: in sedimentology, an area thickly filled with sediment in which the weight of the sediment further depresses the floor of the basin.

Structural or tectonic-related:

- Structural basin: a syncline-like depression; a region of tectonic downwarping as a result of isostasy (the Hawaiian Trough is an example) or subduction (such as the Chilean Central Valley).
- Graben or rift valley: fallen and typically linear depressions or basins created by rifting in a region under tensional tectonic forces.
- Pull-apart basin caused by offset in a strike-slip or transform fault (example: the Dead Sea area).
- Oceanic trench: a deep linear depression on the ocean floor. Oceanic trenches are caused by subduction (when one tectonic plate is pushed underneath another) of oceanic crust beneath either the oceanic crust or continental crust.
- A basin formed by an ice sheet: an area depressed by the weight of the ice sheet resulting in post-glacial rebound after the ice melts (the area adjacent to the ice sheet may be pulled down to create a peripheral depression.)

Volcanism-related:

- Caldera: a volcanic depression resulting from collapse following a volcanic eruption.
- Pit crater: a volcanic depression smaller than a caldera formed by a sinking, or caving in, of the ground surface lying over a void.
- Maar: a depression resulting from phreatomagmatic eruption or diatreme explosion.

== List of depressions ==
- Aral–Caspian Depression
- Baetic Depression
- Bodélé Depression
- Caspian Depression
- Danakil Depression
- Eider-Treene Depression
- Georgia Depression
- Giurgeu-Brașov Depression
- Godzareh Depression
- Huancabamba Depression
- Kara Depression
- Karashor Depression
- Kuma–Manych Depression
- Kuznetsk Depression
- Mari Depression
- Mourdi Depression
- Qattara Depression
- Regen Depression
- Ronda Depression
- Táchira Depression
- Tunkin Depression
- Turan Depression
- Turpan Depression
- Tuva Depression
- Upemba Depression
- Weser Depression
- Wittlich Depression
- Wümme Depression

== See also ==
- Cryptodepression
- List of places on land with elevations below sea level
- Ponor
