= Pechora coal basin =

Coal mining region in Russia

The Pechora coal basin (Печорский угольный бассейн) is located in the Extreme North of European Russia. In covers over 90,000 km^{2} in Komi Republic and Nenets Autonomous Okrug of the Arkhangelsk Oblast.

The basin is associated with three major depressions: Usa River depression, Korotaikha depression and Kara depression, stretching north–south along the Western foothills of Northern Ural Mountains and Pay-Khoy Ridge.

Coals in the basin widely range from brown coals to anthracites, of varying yield and ash content.

Major mines are in Vorkuta and Inta regions. During 1957-1993 high quality coke coal was mined in Khalmer-Yu.

== See also ==
- Timan-Pechora Basin
