= Baydaratskaya Bay =

Bay in Russia

- Байдарацкая губа (Russian)
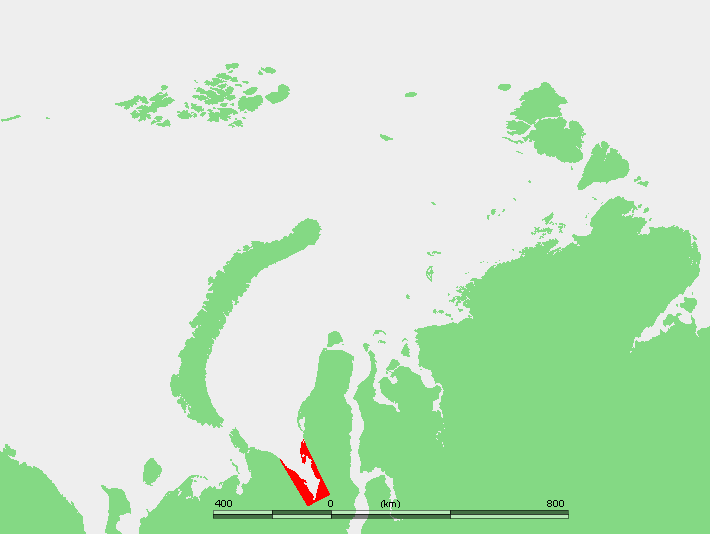
- Location of Baydaratskaya Bay in the Kara Sea.
- Interactive map of Baydaratskaya Bay
- Coordinates: 69°N 67.5°E
- Type: bay
- Ocean/sea sources: Kara Sea
- Basin countries: Russia

Baydaratskaya Bay or Baydarata Bay (Russian: Байдарацкая губа, Baydaratskaya guba) is a bay in Russia, located in the southern part of the Kara Sea between the coastline of the Polar Urals, the northern end of the Ural Mountains, and Yamal Peninsula. The length of the bay is approx. 180 km, mouth width - 78 km, depth - up to 20 m.

Surface water temperature is 5-6C during summertime. The bay freezes up during winter. The rivers Baydarata, Yuribey, Kara, and some others flow into the Baydarata Bay.

The bay contains the following larger islands: Torasavey Island, Litke Island, Ngonjartso Island, Polymesyats Island, and Levdiyev Island.

A four-pipe gas pipelines have been laid by Gazprom on the seabed across the bay from gas deposits of the Yamal in 2014.
