= Ust-Kara, Nenets Autonomous Okrug =

Village in Zapolyarny District, Nenets Autonomous Okrug

Ust-Kara Усть-Ка́ра
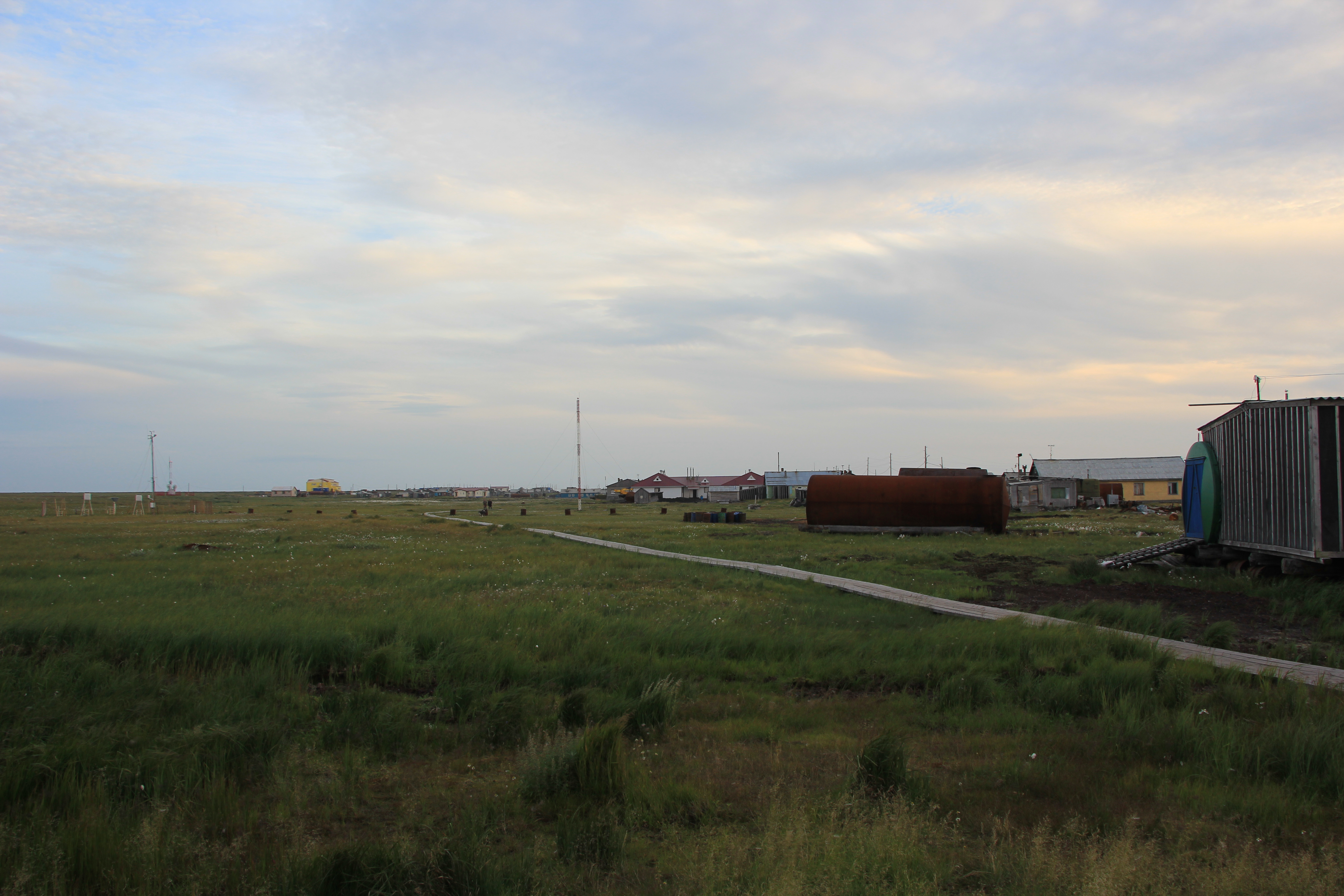
- Interactive map of Ust-Kara
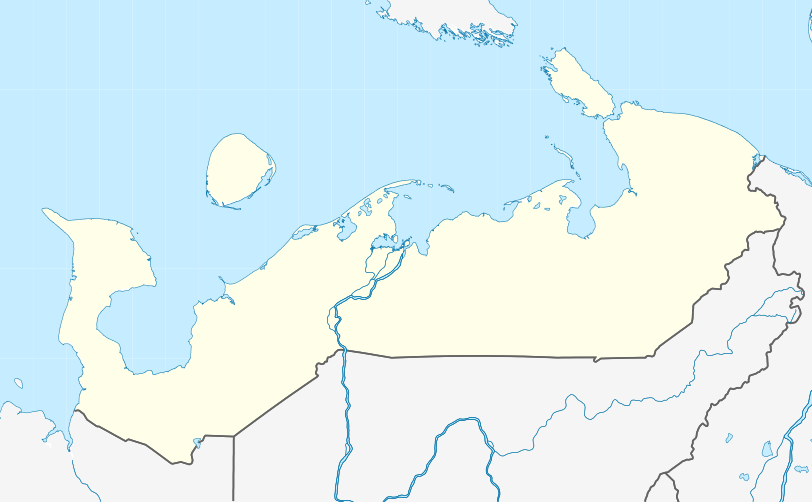
- Location of Ust-Kara Ust-Kara (Nenets Autonomous Okrug)
- Country: Russia
- Federal subject: Nenets Autonomous Okrug
- Founded: at latest 1932

Area
  - Total: 0.659 km^{2} (0.254 sq mi)

Population (2010 Census)
  - Total: 574
  - Estimate (2021): 544 (−5.2%)
  - Density: 871/km^{2} (2,260/sq mi)
- Time zone: UTC+3 (MSK)
- Postal code: 166750
- Dialing code: +7 81857
- OKTMO ID: 11811448101
- Website: karaselsovet.ru

Ust-Kara (Russian: Усть-Ка́ра) is a village on the eastern border of Zapolyarny District, Nenets Autonomous Okrug, Russia. It had a population of 574 as of 2010, a decrease from its population of 677 in 2002.

== Geography ==
The village is located at the mouth of the Kara, next to the border with Yamalo-Nenets Autonomous Okrug. The nearest major city is Vorkuta, which is about 200 km south. Southwest of the settlement is the Kara crater, which is one of the largest craters on Earth, at 65 km in diameter.

== History ==
In 2003, there was a hepatitis A outbreak in the village. One year later, in 2004, the only school in the village burned down, followed by the decision to build a new one.

== Transport ==
There is no road to Ust-Kara, so the village can only be reached by a flight from Naryan-Mar.

== Climate ==
Ust-Kara has a subarctic climate (Dfc).

== Notable people ==
Andrey Rasbash (December 15, 1952 — July 23, 2006) - figure TV, cameraman and film director, television presenter, and producer.
