= Kara (river) =

River draining to the Arctic Kara Sea in Russia

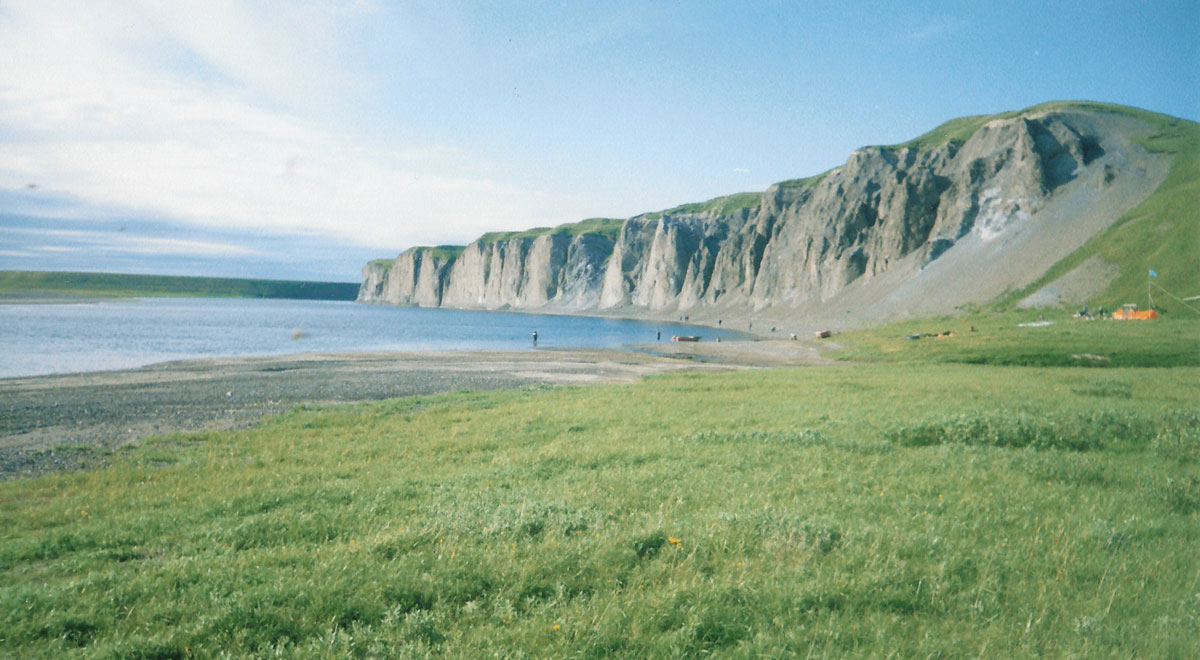
- From the lower reaches of Kara
- Native name: Ка́ра (Russian)

Location
- Country: Russia

Physical characteristics
- Source: Polar Urals; Confluence of rivers Malaya and Bolshaya Kara
- Mouth: Baydaratskaya Bay (Kara Sea)
  - coordinates: 69°09′59″N 64°47′11″E
- Length: 257 km (160 mi)
- Basin size: 13,400 km^{2} (5,200 sq mi)

The Kara (Russian: Ка́ра) is a river draining to the Arctic Kara Sea in Russia. It flows through the Pai-Khoi Range in the Polar Ural region, and forms parts of the borders between the Yamalo-Nenets Autonomous Okrug, the Nenets Autonomous Okrug and the Komi Republic.

The length of the river, from the confluence of the Malaya and Bolshaya Kara to the mouth in the Baydaratskaya Bay is 257 kilometres (160 mi). Its drainage basin area is 13,400 square kilometres (5,200 sq mi). The settlement of Ust-Kara is near the river mouth. The name of the river is derived from Nenets word meaning "hummocked ice". Alternatively, it is thought to be derived from the Turkic word kara, meaning 'black'.
