= Pay-Khoy Range =

Mountain range in Russia

- хребет Пай-Хой
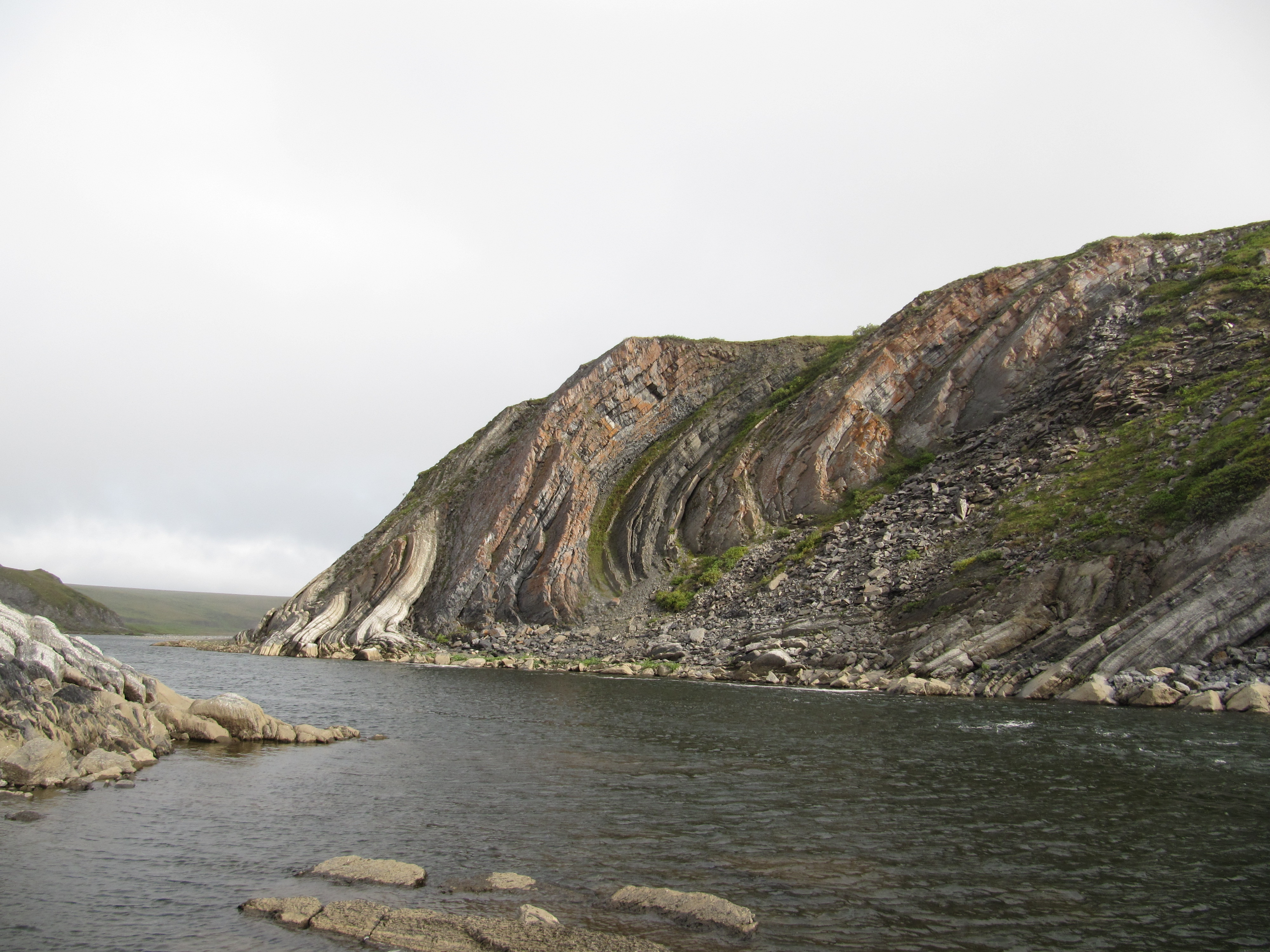
- Folded layers of rock of the Pay-Khoy Range at the Silovayaha River

Highest point
- Peak: Morye-Iz
- Elevation: 423 m (1,388 ft)
- Coordinates: 69°25′39″N 62°12′32″E

Geography
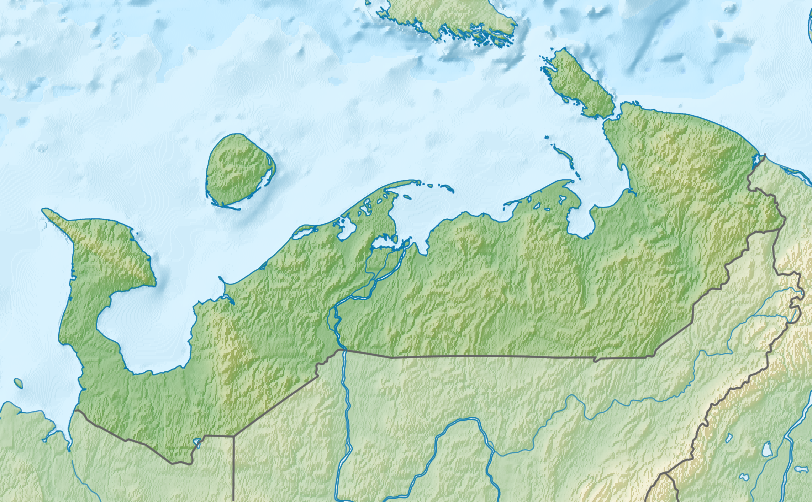
- Location within Nenets Autonomous Okrug
- Country: Russia
- Federal subject: Nenets Autonomous Okrug
- Range coordinates: 69°12′13″N 62°36′28″E
- Parent range: Urals

Geology
- Orogeny: Cimmerian Orogeny
- Rock age: Late Triassic - Early Jurassic.
- Rock type(s): Sandstone, marl, limestone and crystalline shale

Climbing
- Easiest route: From Amderma

The Pay-Khoy Range (Russian: хребет Пай-Хой) is a mountain range at the northern end of the Ural Mountains. It lies within the Nenets Autonomous Okrug.

== Geography ==
Pay-Khoy Range

The ridge is extended from northwest to southeast. It is located on the Yugorsky Peninsula, in the eastern part of the Nenets Autonomous Okrug. The ridge continues to Vaygach Island, thus separating the Barents Sea and the Kara Sea. The highest point of Pay-Khoy is the mountain of Moreiz (467 metres (1,532 ft)). The range separates the drainage basins of the Korotaikha River (west, Barents Sea) and the Kara River (east, Kara Sea).

The areas around Pay-Khoy do not have permanent population. The closest permanent settlements are Amderma and Ust-Kara, Nenets Autonomous Okrug The range is located in the tundra, to the north of the tree line.

The climate in the Pai-Khoi area is subarctic. Winter here lasts up to 230 days, with the average annual air temperature being −9 °C (16 °F) (in January, the average temperature drops to −20 °C (−4 °F), in July it rises to +6 °C (43 °F); in some years, the air temperature can reach +30 °C (86 °F) in summer, and drop to −40 °C (−40 °F) in winter). The annual rainfall reaches 700 mm (28 in) (in February the amount is minimal, in August–September – maximum). The region is part of the permafrost zone.

== Geology ==
The Pay-Khoy range forms a curved orogen together with the Ural Mountains, Vaygach Island and the Novaya Zemlya archipelago. The Pay-Khoy and Novaya Zemlya are younger than the orogeny that formed the Ural mountains. They were formed during the Cimmerian Orogeny between the Late Triassic and Early Jurassic.

== Bibliography ==
- Kovalskiy, M.A. (2015) Northern Urals and the Coastal Range Pai-Khoi. Volume 1. Research Expeditions of the Imperial Russian Geographic Society in 1847, 1848 and 1850. ISBN 5519416656
