= Khalmer-Yu =

Human settlement in Russia

Coordinates: 67°56′38″N 64°44′29″E

Khalmer-Yu (Russian: Хальмер-Ю, Nenets: Хальмер'ю) is a ghost town, a former urban-type settlement in Komi Republic, Russia, disestablished in 1995. Its main occupation was coal mining of high-quality coke coal in Pechora coal basin. It was administered by Gornyatsky district council of Vorkuta.

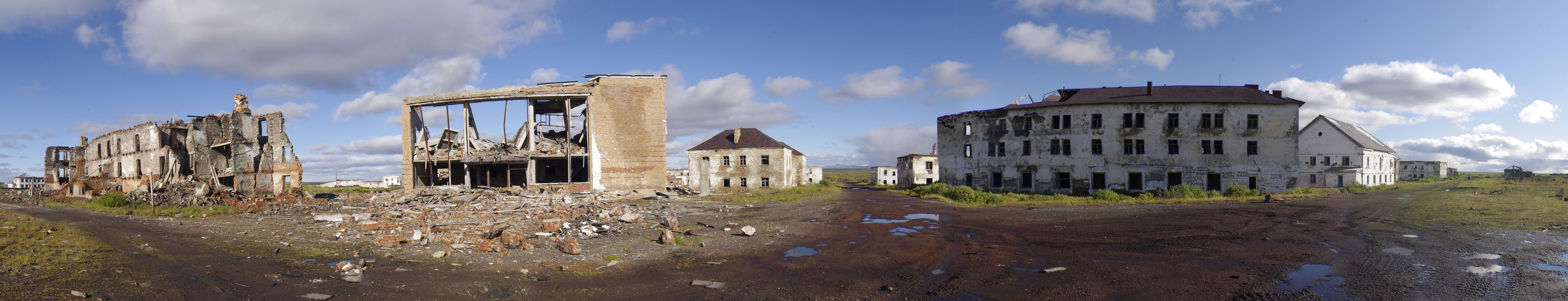
Centre of Khalmer-Yu: ruins

It was named after the Khalmer'yu River. The name is translated from Nenets language as "River in the Death Valley", because the place was used a burial grounds by the indigenous population.

== History ==
Coal in the area was discovered in the early 1940s. Industrial mining started in 1957. Initially the settlement, together with the surrounding coal fields belonged to Nenets Autonomous Okrug. However mining was carried out by Vorkutugol (Воркутуголь, "Vorkutcoal") combine. Therefore, eventually was transferred to Komi ASSR in November 1959.

In 1993 it was decided to shut down mining operations and to liquidate the settlement by 1995. The last inhabitants were forcibly removed with the help of OMON.

== Proving ground ==
In the early 2000s it became part of a military proving ground Pemboy (Пембой) as a result of the restoration of the aviation proving ground Khalmer-Yu which existed since the 1960s 15–20 km northeast of the settlement.
