= Orlovka =

Orlovka may refer to:

- Orlovka (air base), in Amur Oblast, Russia
- Orlovka, Kyrgyzstan, a town in Chuy Region, Kyrgyzstan
- settlements in Russia:
  - Orlovka, Altai Krai
  - Orlovka, Arkharinsky District, Amur Oblast
  - Orlovka, Konstantinovsky District, Amur Oblast
  - Orlovka, Alsheyevsky District, Republic of Bashkortostan
  - Orlovka, Arkhangelsky District, Bashkortostan
  - Orlovka, Bakalinsky District, Republic of Bashkortostan
  - Orlovka, Belebeyevsky District, Republic of Bashkortostan
  - Orlovka, Blagoveshchensky District, Republic of Bashkortostan
  - Orlovka, Fyodorovsky District, Republic of Bashkortostan
  - Orlovka, Iglinsky District, Republic of Bashkortostan
  - Orlovka, Karmaskalinsky District, Republic of Bashkortostan
  - Orlovka, Uchalinsky District, Republic of Bashkortostan
  - Orlovka, Yanaulsky District, Republic of Bashkortostan
  - Orlovka, Vladimir Oblast
  - Orlovka (station), Volgograd Oblast
  - Krasnaya Orlovka, Amur Oblast
  - Mokraya Orlovka, Belgorod Oblast
- rivers in Russia:
  - Orlovka (Bolshoy Anyuy), a tributary of the Bolshoy Anyuy in Chukotka
  - Orlovka (Ket), a tributary of the Ket in Tomsk Oblast
  - Orlovka (Mamyn), a tributary of the Selemzha in Amur Oblast
- The Russian-language name of several settlements in Ukraine named Orlivka
