= Magash =

Magash Магаш
- Village
- Location within Bashkortostan Location within Russia
- Coordinates: 54°17′N 56°38′E
- Country: Russia
- Region: Bashkortostan
- District: Arkhangelsky District
- Time zone: UTC+5:00

Magash (Russian: Магаш; Bashkir: Мағаш, Mağaş) is a rural locality (a village) in Krasnozilimsky Selsoviet, Arkhangelsky District, Bashkortostan, Russia. The population was 162 as of 2010. There are 6 streets.

== Geography ==
Magash is located 19 km southwest of Arkhangelskoye (the district's administrative centre) by road. Krasny Zilim is the nearest rural locality.
