= Pobeda, Arkhangelsky District, Republic of Bashkortostan =

Pobeda Победа
- Village
- Location within Bashkortostan Location within Russia
- Coordinates: 54°20′N 56°43′E
- Country: Russia
- Region: Bashkortostan
- District: Arkhangelsky District
- Time zone: UTC+5:00

Pobeda (Russian: Победа) is a rural locality (a village) in Arkh-Latyshsky Selsoviet, Arkhangelsky District, Bashkortostan, Russia. The population was 71 as of 2010. There are 4 streets.

== Geography ==
Pobeda is located 11 km southwest of Arkhangelskoye (the district's administrative centre) by road. Zaitovo is the nearest rural locality.
