= Usakly =

Usakly Усаклы
- Village
- Location within Bashkortostan Location within Russia
- Coordinates: 54°21′N 57°03′E
- Country: Russia
- Region: Bashkortostan
- District: Arkhangelsky District
- Time zone: UTC+5:00

Usakly (Russian: Усаклы; Bashkir: Уҫаҡлы, Uśaqlı) is a rural locality (a village) in Bakaldinsky Selsoviet, Arkhangelsky District, Bashkortostan, Russia. The population was 217 as of 2010. There are 6 streets.

== Geography ==
Usakly is located 24 km southeast of Arkhangelskoye (the district's administrative centre) by road. Petropavlovka is the nearest rural locality.
