= Kumurly =

Kumurly Кумурлы
- Selo
- Location within Bashkortostan Location within Russia
- Coordinates: 54°30′N 56°34′E
- Country: Russia
- Region: Bashkortostan
- District: Arkhangelsky District
- Time zone: UTC+5:00

Kumurly (Russian: Кумурлы; Bashkir: Көмәрле, Kömärle) is a rural locality (a selo) in Lipovsky Selsoviet, Arkhangelsky District, Bashkortostan, Russia. The population was 296 as of 2010. There are 9 streets.

== Geography ==
Kumurly is located 26 km northwest of Arkhangelskoye (the district's administrative centre) by road. Blagoveshchenka is the nearest rural locality.
