= Krasnaya Regizla =

Krasnaya Regizla Красная Регизла
- Village
- Location within Bashkortostan Location within Russia
- Coordinates: 54°20′N 56°51′E
- Country: Russia
- Region: Bashkortostan
- District: Arkhangelsky District
- Time zone: UTC+5:00

Krasnaya Regizla (Russian: Красная Регизла; Bashkir: Ҡыҙыл Ырғыҙлы, Qıźıl Irğıźlı) is a rural locality (a village) in Arkh-Latyshsky Selsoviet, Arkhangelsky District, Bashkortostan, Russia. The population was 66 as of 2010. There are 8 streets.

== Geography ==
Krasnaya Regizla is located 14 km southeast of Arkhangelskoye (the district's administrative centre) by road. Gorny is the nearest rural locality.
