= Lagutovka =

Lagutovka Лагутовка
- Village
- Location within Bashkortostan Location within Russia
- Coordinates: 54°36′N 56°56′E
- Country: Russia
- Region: Bashkortostan
- District: Arkhangelsky District
- Time zone: UTC+5:00

Lagutovka (Russian: Лагутовка) is a rural locality (a village) in Inzersky Selsoviet, Arkhangelsky District, Bashkortostan, Russia. The population was 30 as of 2010. There is 1 street.

== Geography ==
Lagutovka is located 29 km north of Arkhangelskoye (the district's administrative centre) by road. Sukhopol is the nearest rural locality.
