= Priuralovka =

Priuralovka Приураловка
- Village
- Location within Bashkortostan Location within Russia
- Coordinates: 54°18′N 56°53′E
- Country: Russia
- Region: Bashkortostan
- District: Arkhangelsky District
- Time zone: UTC+5:00

Priuralovka (Russian: Приураловка) is a rural locality (a village) in Arkh-Latyshsky Selsoviet, Arkhangelsky District, Bashkortostan, Russia. The population was 55 as of 2010. There are 6 streets.

== Geography ==
Priuralovka is located 21 km southeast of Arkhangelskoye (the district's administrative centre) by road. Chik-Yelga is the nearest rural locality.
