= Verkhniye Irnykshi =

Verkhniye Irnykshi Верхние Ирныкши
- Village
- Location within Bashkortostan Location within Russia
- Coordinates: 54°25′N 56°38′E
- Country: Russia
- Region: Bashkortostan
- District: Arkhangelsky District
- Time zone: UTC+5:00

Verkhniye Irnykshi (Russian: Верхние Ирныкши; Bashkir: Үрге Ырныҡшы, Ürge Irnıqşı) is a rural locality (a village) in Abzanovsky Selsoviet, Arkhangelsky District, Bashkortostan, Russia. The population was 75 as of 2010. There are 3 streets.

== Geography ==
Verkhniye Irnykshi is located 11 km west of Arkhangelskoye (the district's administrative centre) by road. Abzanovo is the nearest rural locality.
