= Tavakachevo =

Tavakachevo Тавакачево
- Village
- Location within Bashkortostan Location within Russia
- Coordinates: 54°28′N 56°45′E
- Country: Russia
- Region: Bashkortostan
- District: Arkhangelsky District
- Time zone: UTC+5:00

Tavakachevo (Russian: Тавакачево; Bashkir: Тәүәкәс, Täwäkäs) is a rural locality (a village) and the administrative center of Tavakachevsky Selsoviet, Arkhangelsky District, Bashkortostan, Russia. The population was 594 as of 2010. There are 10 streets.

== Geography ==
Tavakachevo is located 7 km north of Arkhangelskoye (the district's administrative centre) by road. Priuralye is the nearest rural locality.
