= Shakirovka =

Shakirovka Шакировка
- Village
- Location within Bashkortostan Location within Russia
- Coordinates: 54°37′N 56°46′E
- Country: Russia
- Region: Bashkortostan
- District: Arkhangelsky District
- Time zone: UTC+5:00

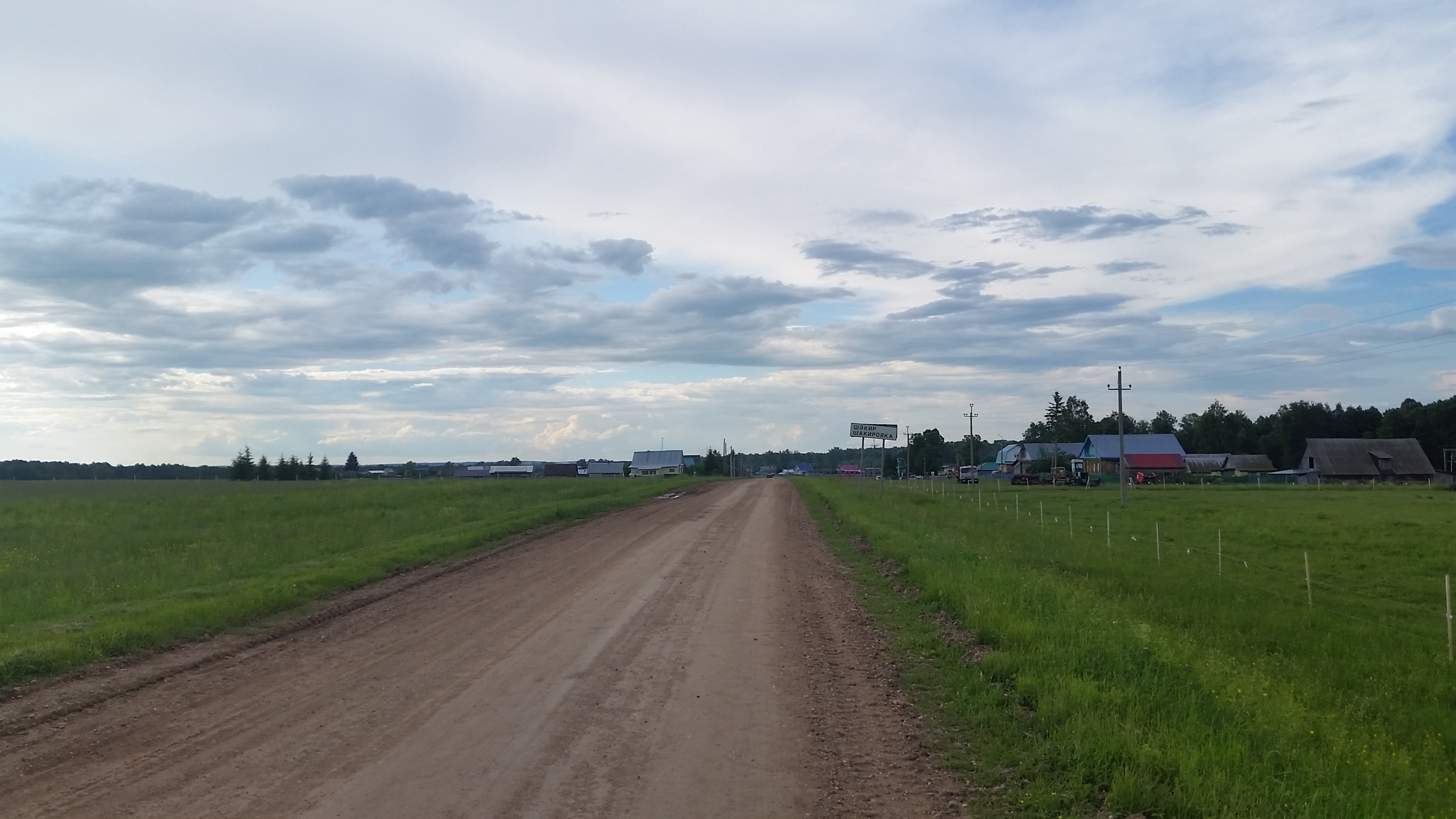
view of Shakirovka from the road from the side of Sagitovo

Shakirovka (Russian: Шакировка; Bashkir: Шакир, Şakir) is a rural locality (a village) and the administrative center of Krasnokurtovsky Selsoviet, Arkhangelsky District, Bashkortostan, Russia. The population was 126 as of 2010. There are 3 streets.

== Geography ==
Shakirovka is located 28 km north of Arkhangelskoye (the district's administrative centre) by road. Sagitovo is the nearest rural locality.
