= Novoshareyevo =

Novoshareyevo Новошареево
- Village
- Location within Bashkortostan Location within Russia
- Coordinates: 54°31′N 56°41′E
- Country: Russia
- Region: Bashkortostan
- District: Arkhangelsky District
- Time zone: UTC+5:00

Novoshareyevo (Russian: Новошареево; Bashkir: Яңы Шәрәй, Yañı Şäräy) is a rural locality (a village) in Lipovsky Selsoviet, Arkhangelsky District, Bashkortostan, Russia. The population was 223 as of 2010. There are 7 streets.

== Geography ==
Novoshareyevo is located 25 km north of Arkhangelskoye (the district's administrative centre) by road. Novye Sarty is the nearest rural locality.
