= Kartashevka =

Kartashevka Карташевка
- Village
- Location within Bashkortostan Location within Russia
- Coordinates: 54°22′N 56°30′E
- Country: Russia
- Region: Bashkortostan
- District: Arkhangelsky District
- Time zone: UTC+5:00

Kartashevka (Russian: Карташевка) is a rural locality (a village) in Orlovsky Selsoviet, Arkhangelsky District, Bashkortostan, Russia. The population was 103 as of 2010. There are 2 streets.

== Geography ==
Kartashevka is located 25 km west of Arkhangelskoye (the district's administrative centre) by road. Pribelsky is the nearest rural locality.
