= Blagoveshchenka, Republic of Bashkortostan =

Blagoveshchenka Благовещенка
- Selo
- Location within Bashkortostan Location within Russia
- Coordinates: 54°30′N 56°38′E
- Country: Russia
- Region: Bashkortostan
- District: Arkhangelsky District
- Time zone: UTC+5:00

Blagoveshchenka (Russian: Благовещенка) is a rural locality (a selo) and the administrative center of Lipovsky Selsoviet, Arkhangelsky District, Bashkortostan, Russia. The population was 490 as of 2010. There are 12 streets.

== Geography ==
Blagoveshchenka is located 21 km northwest of Arkhangelskoye (the district's administrative centre) by road. Novye Sarty is the nearest rural locality.
