= Krasny Zilim =

Krasny Zilim Красный Зилим
- Selo
- Location within Bashkortostan Location within Russia
- Coordinates: 54°19′N 56°36′E
- Country: Russia
- Region: Bashkortostan
- District: Arkhangelsky District
- Time zone: UTC+5:00

Krasny Zilim (Russian: Красный Зилим; Bashkir: Ҡыҙыл Еҙем, Qıźıl Yeźem) is a rural locality (a selo) and the administrative center of Krasnozilimsky Selsoviet, Arkhangelsky District, Bashkortostan, Russia. The population was 534 as of 2010. There are 10 streets.

== Geography ==
Krasny Zilim is located 19 km southwest of Arkhangelskoye (the district's administrative centre) by road. Orlovka is the nearest rural locality.
