= Novochishma =

Novochishma Новочишма
- Village
- Location within Bashkortostan Location within Russia
- Coordinates: 54°30′N 56°41′E
- Country: Russia
- Region: Bashkortostan
- District: Arkhangelsky District
- Time zone: UTC+5:00

Novochishma (Russian: Новочишма; Bashkir: Яңы Шишмә, Yañı Şişmä) is a rural locality (a village) in Lipovsky Selsoviet, Arkhangelsky District, Bashkortostan, Russia. The population was 166 as of 2010. There are 2 streets.

== Geography ==
Novochishma is located 25 km north of Arkhangelskoye (the district's administrative centre) by road. Novye Sarty is the nearest rural locality.
