= Priuralye =

Priuralye Приуралье
- Village
- Location within Bashkortostan Location within Russia
- Coordinates: 54°26′N 56°44′E
- Country: Russia
- Region: Bashkortostan
- District: Arkhangelsky District
- Time zone: UTC+5:00

Priuralye (Russian: Приуралье) is a rural locality (a village) in Tavakachevsky Selsoviet, Arkhangelsky District, Bashkortostan, Russia. The population was 373 as of 2010. There are 4 streets.

== Geography ==
Priuralye is located 6 km north of Arkhangelskoye (the district's administrative centre) by road. Tavakachevo is the nearest rural locality.
