= Kurgash =

Kurgash Кургаш
- Village
- Location within Bashkortostan Location within Russia
- Coordinates: 54°24′N 56°58′E
- Country: Russia
- Region: Bashkortostan
- District: Arkhangelsky District
- Time zone: UTC+5:00

Kurgash (Russian: Кургаш; Bashkir: Ҡурғаш, Qurğaş) is a rural locality (a village) in Bakaldinsky Selsoviet, Arkhangelsky District, Bashkortostan, Russia. The population was 113 as of 2010. There are 3 streets.

== Geography ==
Kurgash is located 16 km east of Arkhangelskoye (the district's administrative centre) by road. Terekly is the nearest rural locality.
