= Basinovka =

Basinovka Басиновка
- Village
- Location within Bashkortostan Location within Russia
- Coordinates: 54°28′39″N 56°54′43″E
- Country: Russia
- Region: Bashkortostan
- District: Arkhangelsky District
- Time zone: UTC+5:00

Basinovka (Russian: Басиновка; Bashkir: Баҫыу, Baśıw) is a rural locality (a village) in Bakaldinsky Selsoviet, Arkhangelsky District, Bashkortostan, Russia. The population was 133 as of 2010. There are 3 streets.

== Geography ==
Basinovka is located 16 km northeast of Arkhangelskoye (the district's administrative centre) by road. Ustye-Bassy is the nearest rural locality.
