= Kazanka, Arkhangelsky District, Republic of Bashkortostan =

Kazanka Казанка
- Selo
- Location within Bashkortostan Location within Russia
- Coordinates: 54°30′N 56°50′E
- Country: Russia
- Region: Bashkortostan
- District: Arkhangelsky District
- Time zone: UTC+5:00

Kazanka (Russian: Казанка) is a rural locality (a selo) in Inzersky Selsoviet, Arkhangelsky District, Bashkortostan, Russia. The population was 323 as of 2010. There are 4 streets.

== Geography ==
Kazanka is located 15 km north of Arkhangelskoye (the district's administrative centre) by road. Alexeyevskoye is the nearest rural locality.
