= Chik-Yelga =

Chik-Yelga Чик-Елга
- Village
- Location within Bashkortostan Location within Russia
- Coordinates: 54°17′N 56°51′E
- Country: Russia
- Region: Bashkortostan
- District: Arkhangelsky District
- Time zone: UTC+5:00

Chik-Yelga (Russian: Чик-Елга; Bashkir: Сикйылға, Sikyılğa) is a rural locality (a village) in Arkh-Latyshsky Selsoviet, Arkhangelsky District, Bashkortostan, Russia. The population was 63 as of 2010. There are 8 streets.

== Geography ==
Chik-Yelga is located 19 km south of Arkhangelskoye (the district's administrative centre) by road. Priuralovka is the nearest rural locality.
