= Askino =

Askino (Russian: Аскино) is the name of two rural localities in the Republic of Bashkortostan, Russia:

- Askino, Arkhangelsky District, Republic of Bashkortostan, a village in Arkhangelsky District
- Askino, Askinsky District, Republic of Bashkortostan, a selo in Askinsky District
