= Aytmembetovo =

Aytmembetovo Айтмембетово
- Village
- Location within Bashkortostan Location within Russia
- Coordinates: 54°29′N 57°02′E
- Country: Russia
- Region: Bashkortostan
- District: Arkhangelsky District
- Time zone: UTC+5:00

Aytmembetovo (Russian: Айтмембетово; Bashkir: Айытмәмбәт, Ayıtmämbät) is a rural locality (a village) in Uzunlarovsky Selsoviet, Arkhangelsky District, Bashkortostan, Russia. The population was 310 as of 2010. There are 5 streets.

== Geography ==
Aytmembetovo is located 30 km northeast of Arkhangelskoye (the district's administrative centre) by road. Azovo is the nearest rural locality.
