= Verkhniye Lemezy =

Verkhniye Lemezy Верхние Лемезы
- Village
- Location within Bashkortostan Location within Russia
- Coordinates: 54°37′N 57°11′E
- Country: Russia
- Region: Bashkortostan
- District: Arkhangelsky District
- Time zone: UTC+5:00

Verkhniye Lemezy (Russian: Верхние Лемезы; Bashkir: Үрге Ләмәҙ, Ürge Lämäź) is a rural locality (a village) in Inzersky Selsoviet, Arkhangelsky District, Bashkortostan, Russia. The population was 105 as of 2010. There are 3 streets.

== Geography ==
Verkhniye Lemezy is located 46 km northeast of Arkhangelskoye (the district's administrative centre) by road. Verkhny Frolovsky is the nearest rural locality.
