= Kizgi =

Kizgi Кизги
- Village
- Location within Bashkortostan Location within Russia
- Coordinates: 54°24′N 57°07′E
- Country: Russia
- Region: Bashkortostan
- District: Arkhangelsky District
- Time zone: UTC+5:00

Kizgi (Russian: Кизги; Bashkir: Ҡыҙғы, Qıźğı) is a rural locality (a village) in Bakaldinsky Selsoviet, Arkhangelsky District, Bashkortostan, Russia. The population was 168 as of 2010. There are 3 streets.

== Geography ==
Kizgi is located 28 km east of Arkhangelskoye (the district's administrative centre) by road. Petropavlovka is the nearest rural locality.
