= Mullakayevo =

Mullakayevo Муллакаево
- Village
- Location within Bashkortostan Location within Russia
- Coordinates: 54°21′N 56°50′E
- Country: Russia
- Region: Bashkortostan
- District: Arkhangelsky District
- Time zone: UTC+5:00

Mullakayevo (Russian: Муллакаево; Bashkir: Муллаҡай, Mullaqay) is a rural locality (a village) in Arkh-Latyshsky Selsoviet, Arkhangelsky District, Bashkortostan, Russia. The population was 201 as of 2010. There are 4 streets.

== Geography ==
Mullakayevo is located 8 km southeast of Arkhangelskoye (the district's administrative centre) by road. Beysovo is the nearest rural locality.
