= Novokyzylyarovo =

Novokyzylyarovo Новокызылярово
- Village
- Location within Bashkortostan Location within Russia
- Coordinates: 54°28′N 56°36′E
- Country: Russia
- Region: Bashkortostan
- District: Arkhangelsky District
- Time zone: UTC+5:00

Novokyzylyarovo (Russian: Новокызылярово; Bashkir: Яңы Ҡыҙылъяр, Yañı Qıźılyar) is a rural locality (a village) in Lipovsky Selsoviet, Arkhangelsky District, Bashkortostan, Russia. The population was 30 as of 2010. There is 1 street.

== Geography ==
Novokyzylyarovo is located 23 km northwest of Arkhangelskoye (the district's administrative centre) by road. Asy is the nearest rural locality.
