= Sukhopol =

Sukhopol Сухополь
- Village
- Location within Bashkortostan Location within Russia
- Coordinates: 54°33′N 56°53′E
- Country: Russia
- Region: Bashkortostan
- District: Arkhangelsky District
- Time zone: UTC+5:00

Sukhopol (Russian: Сухополь) is a rural locality (a village) in Inzersky Selsoviet, Arkhangelsky District, Bashkortostan, Russia. The population was 115 as of 2010. There are 2 streets.

== Geography ==
Sukhopol is located 21 km northeast of Arkhangelskoye (the district's administrative centre) by road. Valentinovka is the nearest rural locality.
