= Uzunlarovo =

Uzunlarovo Узунларово
- Selo
- Location within Bashkortostan Location within Russia
- Coordinates: 54°31′N 56°56′E
- Country: Russia
- Region: Bashkortostan
- District: Arkhangelsky District
- Time zone: UTC+5:00

Uzunlarovo (Russian: Узунларово; Bashkir: Оҙондар, Oźondar) is a rural locality (a selo) and the administrative center of Uzunlarovsky Selsoviet, Arkhangelsky District, Bashkortostan, Russia. The population was 415 as of 2010. There are 9 streets.

== Geography ==
Uzunlarovo is located 20 km northeast of Arkhangelskoye (the district's administrative centre) by road. Valentinovka is the nearest rural locality.
