= Ubalary =

Ubaraly Убалары
- Village
- Location within Bashkortostan Location within Russia
- Coordinates: 54°13′N 56°49′E
- Country: Russia
- Region: Bashkortostan
- District: Arkhangelsky District
- Time zone: UTC+5:00

Ubalary (Russian: Убалары; Bashkir: Убалар, Ubalar) is a rural locality (a village) in Arkh-Latyshsky Selsoviet, Arkhangelsky District, Bashkortostan, Russia. The population was 248 as of 2010. There are 4 streets.

== Geography ==
Ubalary is located 24 km south of Arkhangelskoye (the district's administrative centre) by road. Askino is the nearest rural locality.
