= Ustye-Bassy =

Ustye-Bassy Устье-Бассы
- Village
- Location within Bashkortostan Location within Russia
- Coordinates: 54°29′N 56°51′E
- Country: Russia
- Region: Bashkortostan
- District: Arkhangelsky District
- Time zone: UTC+5:00

Ustye-Bassy (Russian: Устье-Бассы; Bashkir: Баҫыутамаҡ, Baśıwtamaq) is a rural locality (a village) in Tavakachevsky Selsoviet, Arkhangelsky District, Bashkortostan, Russia. The population was 22 as of 2010. There are 2 streets.

== Geography ==
Ustye-Bassy is located 11 km northeast of Arkhangelskoye (the district's administrative centre) by road. Gayfullinskoye is the nearest rural locality.
