= Beysovo =

Beysovo Бейсово
- Village
- Location within Bashkortostan Location within Russia
- Coordinates: 54°23′N 56°50′E
- Country: Russia
- Region: Bashkortostan
- District: Arkhangelsky District
- Time zone: UTC+5:00

Beysovo (Russian: Бейсово; Bashkir: Бәйес, Bäyes) is a rural locality (a village) in Arkh-Latyshsky Selsoviet, Arkhangelsky District, Bashkortostan, Russia. The population was 96 as of 2010. There are 2 streets.

== Geography ==
Beysovo is located 6 km southeast of Arkhangelskoye (the district's administrative centre) by road. Mullakayevo is the nearest rural locality.
