= Kyzylyarovo =

Kyzylyarovo Кызылярово
- Village
- Location within Bashkortostan Location within Russia
- Coordinates: 54°27′N 56°36′E
- Country: Russia
- Region: Bashkortostan
- District: Arkhangelsky District
- Time zone: UTC+5:00

Kyzylyarovo (Russian: Кызылярово; Bashkir: Ҡыҙылъяр, Qıźılyar) is a rural locality (a village) in Abzanovsky Selsoviet, Arkhangelsky District, Bashkortostan, Russia. The population was 127 as of 2010. There are three streets.

== Geography ==
Kyzylyarovo is located 17 km northwest of Arkhangelskoye (the district's administrative centre) by road. Asy is the nearest rural locality.
