= Abzanovo, Arkhangelsky District, Bashkortostan =

Abzanovo Абзаново Абҙан
- Selo
- Location within Bashkortostan Location within Russia
- Coordinates: 54°27′N 56°40′E
- Country: Russia
- Region: Bashkortostan
- District: Arkhangelsky District
- Time zone: [[UTC+5:00]]

Abzanovo (Russian: Абзаново, Bashkir: Абҙан, Abźan) is a rural locality (a selo) and the administrative center of Abzanovsky Selsoviet of Arkhangelsky District, Bashkortostan, Russia. The population was 836 as of 2010. There are 11 streets.

== Geography ==
The village is located on the left bank of the Inzer River, 15 km northwest of Arkhangelskoye (the district's administrative centre) by road. Asy is the nearest rural locality.

== Ethnicity ==
The village is inhabited by Bashkirs and others.
