= Bakaldinskoye =

Bakaldinskoye Бакалдинское
- Selo
- Location within Bashkortostan Location within Russia
- Coordinates: 54°25′N 56°54′E
- Country: Russia
- Region: Bashkortostan
- District: Arkhangelsky District
- Time zone: UTC+5:00

Bakaldinskoye (Russian: Бакалдинское; Bashkir: Баҡалды, Baqaldı) is a rural locality (a selo) and the administrative center of Bakaldinsky Selsoviet, Arkhangelsky District, Bashkortostan, Russia. The population was 621 as of 2010. There are 17 streets.

== Geography ==
Bakaldinskoye is located 11 km northeast of Arkhangelskoye (the district's administrative centre) by road. Terekly is the nearest rural locality.
