= Akkulevo =

Akkulevo Аккулево
- Village
- Location within Bashkortostan Location within Russia
- Coordinates: 54°20′N 56°34′E
- Country: Russia
- Region: Bashkortostan
- District: Arkhangelsky District
- Time zone: UTC+5:00

Akkulevo (Russian: Аккулево; Bashkir: Аҡкүл, Aqkül) is a rural locality (a village) in Orlovsky Selsoviet, Arkhangelsky District, Bashkortostan, Russia. The population was 50 as of 2010. There are 5 streets.

== Geography ==
Akkulevo is located 21 km southwest of Arkhangelskoye (the district's administrative centre) by road. Orlovka is the nearest rural locality.
