= Irnykshi =

Irnykshi Ирныкши
- Selo
- Location within Bashkortostan Location within Russia
- Coordinates: 54°25′N 56°33′E
- Country: Russia
- Region: Bashkortostan
- District: Arkhangelsky District
- Time zone: UTC+5:00

Irnykshi (Russian: Ирныкши; Bashkir: Ырныҡшы, Irnıqşı) is a rural locality (a selo) and the administrative center of Irnykshinsky Selsoviet, Arkhangelsky District, Bashkortostan, Russia. The population was 447 as of 2010. There are 6 streets.

== Geography ==
Irnykshi is located 16 km west of Arkhangelskoye (the district's administrative centre) by road. Berezovka is the nearest rural locality.
