= Gayfullinskoye =

Gayfullinskoye Гайфуллинское
- Village
- Location within Bashkortostan Location within Russia
- Coordinates: 54°28′N 56°49′E
- Country: Russia
- Region: Bashkortostan
- District: Arkhangelsky District
- Time zone: UTC+5:00

Gayfullinskoye (Russian: Гайфуллинское; Bashkir: Ғәйфулла, Ğäyfulla) is a rural locality (a village) in Tavakachevsky Selsoviet, Arkhangelsky District, Bashkortostan, Russia. The population was 31 as of 2010. There are 4 streets.

== Geography ==
Gayfullinskoye is located 13 km northeast of Arkhangelskoye (the district's administrative centre) by road. Ustye-Bassy is the nearest rural locality.
