= Terekly =

Terekly Тереклы
- Village
- Location within Bashkortostan Location within Russia
- Coordinates: 54°25′N 56°57′E
- Country: Russia
- Region: Bashkortostan
- District: Arkhangelsky District
- Time zone: UTC+5:00

Terekly (Russian: Тереклы; Bashkir: Тирәкле, Tiräkle) is a rural locality (a village) in Bakaldinsky Selsoviet, Arkhangelsky District, Bashkortostan, Russia. The population was 520 as of 2010. There are 12 streets.

== Geography ==
Terekly is located 13 km east of Arkhangelskoye (the district's administrative centre) by road. Kurgash is the nearest rural locality.
