= Tukmakly =

Tukmakly Тукмаклы
- Village
- Location within Bashkortostan Location within Russia
- Coordinates: 54°35′N 56°48′E
- Country: Russia
- Region: Bashkortostan
- District: Arkhangelsky District
- Time zone: UTC+5:00

Tukmakly (Russian: Тукмаклы; Bashkir: Туҡмаҡлы, Tuqmaqlı) is a rural locality (a village) in Krasnokurtovsky Selsoviet, Arkhangelsky District, Bashkortostan, Russia. The population was 76 as of 2010. There are 3 streets.

== Geography ==
Tukmakly is located 24 km north of Arkhangelskoye (the district's administrative centre) by road. Sagitovo is the nearest rural locality.
