= Zaitovo =

Zaitovo Заитово
- Village
- Location within Bashkortostan Location within Russia
- Coordinates: 54°18′N 56°42′E
- Country: Russia
- Region: Bashkortostan
- District: Arkhangelsky District
- Time zone: UTC+5:00

Zaitovo (Russian: Заитово; Bashkir: Зәйет, Zäyet) is a rural locality (a village) in Krasnozilimsky Selsoviet, Arkhangelsky District, Bashkortostan, Russia. The population was 238 as of 2010. There are 5 streets.

== Geography ==
Zaitovo is located 16 km southwest of Arkhangelskoye (the district's administrative centre) by road. Kysyndy is the nearest rural locality.
