= Asy, Arkhangelsky District, Republic of Bashkortostan =

Asy Асы
- Village
- Location within Bashkortostan Location within Russia
- Coordinates: 54°28′N 56°37′E
- Country: Russia
- Region: Bashkortostan
- District: Arkhangelsky District
- Time zone: UTC+5:00

Asy (Russian: Асы; Bashkir: Асы, Ası) is a rural locality (a village) in Lipovsky Selsoviet, Arkhangelsky District, Bashkortostan, Russia. The population was 32 as of 2010. There are 2 streets.

== Geography ==
Asy is located 16 km northeast of Arkhangelskoye (the district's administrative centre) by road. Kyzylyarovo is the nearest rural locality.
