= Sagitovo =

Sagitovo Сагитово
- Village
- Location within Bashkortostan Location within Russia
- Coordinates: 54°35′N 56°47′E
- Country: Russia
- Region: Bashkortostan
- District: Arkhangelsky District
- Time zone: UTC+5:00

Sagitovo (Russian: Сагитово; Bashkir: Сәғит, Säğit) is a rural locality (a village) in Krasnokurtovsky Selsoviet, Arkhangelsky District, Bashkortostan, Russia. The population was 55 as of 2010. There is 1 street.

== Geography ==
Sagitovo is located 25 km north of Arkhangelskoye (the district's administrative centre) by road. Tukmakly is the nearest rural locality.
