= Novoustinovka =

Novoustinovka Новоустиновка
- Village
- Location within Bashkortostan Location within Russia
- Coordinates: 54°25′N 56°42′E
- Country: Russia
- Region: Bashkortostan
- District: Arkhangelsky District
- Time zone: UTC+5:00

Novoustinovka (Russian: Новоустиновка) is a rural locality (a village) in Arkhangelsky Selsoviet, Arkhangelsky District, Bashkortostan, Russia. The population was 159 as of 2010. There are 5 streets.

== Geography ==
Novoustinovka is located 7 km northwest of Arkhangelskoye (the district's administrative centre) by road. Arkhangelskoye is the nearest rural locality.
