= Yelovaya =

Location
- Country: Russia

Physical characteristics
- Mouth: Ket
  - coordinates: 58.5106°N 88.5609°E
- Length: 331 km (206 mi)
- Basin size: 6,230 km^{2} (2,410 sq mi)

Basin features
- Progression: Ket→ Ob→ Kara Sea

The Yelovaya, also known as Bolshaya Yelovaya and Chizhandzi (Russian: Еловая, Большая Еловая, Чижандзи) is a river in Krasnoyarsk Krai in Russia, a left tributary of the Ket (Ob basin). The river is 331 kilometres (206 mi) long, and its drainage basin covers 6,230 square kilometres (2,410 mi^{2}).
