= Lisitsa (river) =

Location
- Country: Russia

Physical characteristics
- Mouth: Ket
  - coordinates: 58°32′04″N 85°07′50″E
- Length: 414 km (257 mi)
- Basin size: 7,980 km^{2} (3,080 sq mi)

Basin features
- Progression: Ket→ Ob→ Kara Sea

The Lisitsa, also known as Bolshaya Lisitsa (Russian: Лисица, Большая Лисица), is a river in Tomsk Oblast in Russia, a right tributary of the Ket (Ob basin). The river is 414 kilometres (257 mi) long, and its basin covers 7,980 square kilometres (3,080 mi^{2}). The Lisitsa flows over the West Siberian Plain. Its biggest tributary is the Rayga.
