= Kysyndy =

Kysyndy Кысынды
- Village
- Location within Bashkortostan Location within Russia
- Coordinates: 54°19′N 56°40′E
- Country: Russia
- Region: Bashkortostan
- District: Arkhangelsky District
- Time zone: UTC+5:00

Kysyndy (Russian: Кысынды; Bashkir: Ҡыҫынды, Qıśındı) is a rural locality (a village) in Krasnozilimsky Selsoviet, Arkhangelsky District, Bashkortostan, Russia. The population was 304 as of 2010. There are 3 streets.

== Geography ==
Kysyndy is located 13 km southwest of Arkhangelskoye (the district's administrative centre) by road. Zaitovo is the nearest rural locality.
