= Kas (river) =

Coordinates: 59°57′43″N 90°35′52″E

Kas - Кас
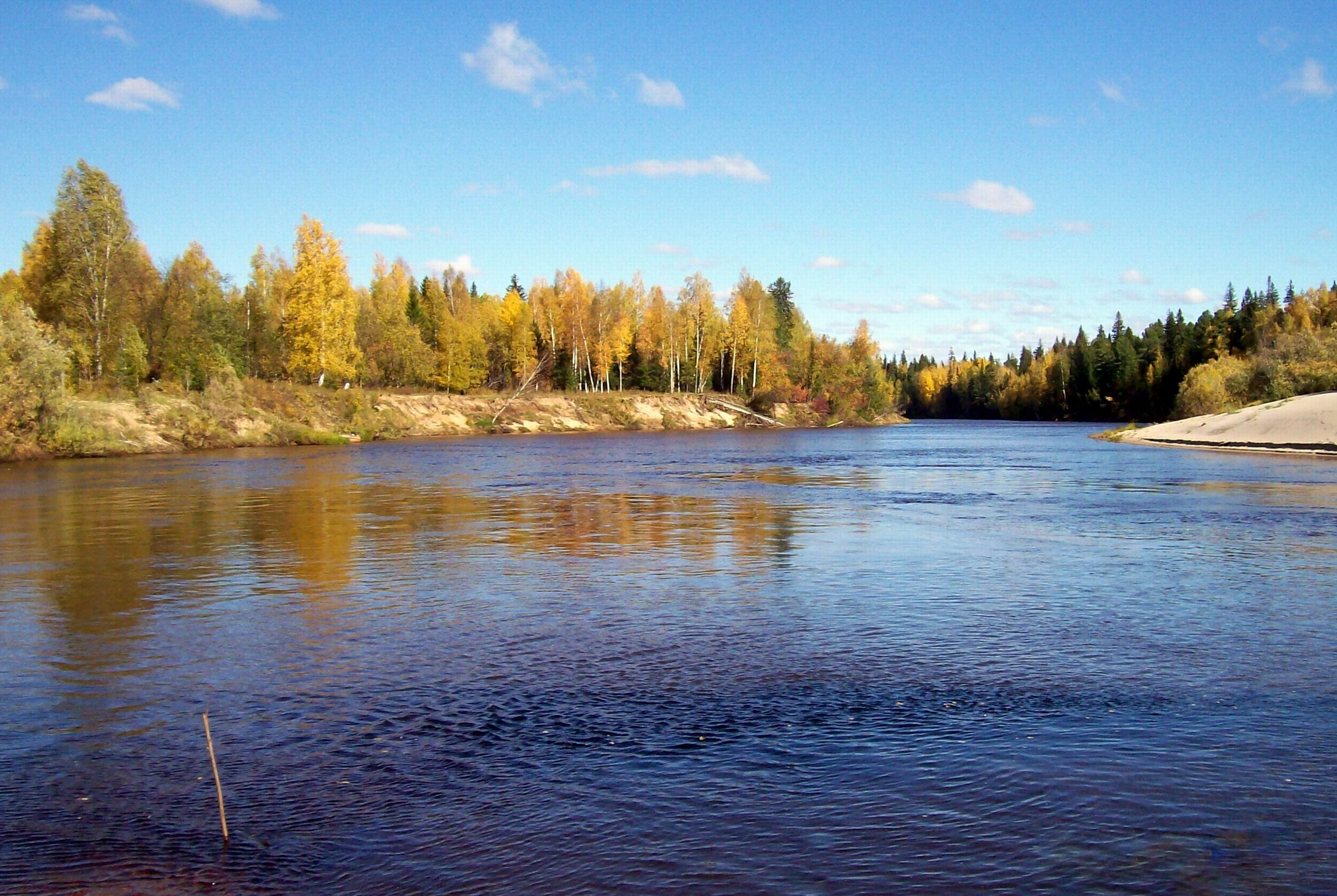

The Kas is a river in West Siberian Russia, a left tributary of the Enise.

It originates at the eastern edge of the vast West Siberian Plain, initially flowing northwest; about halfway along its course, it makes a sharp 90-degree turn. It receives the Malyj Kas tributary (87 km long) and, under the name Kas, takes a northeasterly direction, eventually flowing into the Yenisei River 1,817 km from its mouth. It is 464 km long and has a drainage basin of 11,200 km^{2}. The greater part of the basin lies on low-lying terrain with poor drainage, leading to the formation of swamps during the warm season.

The river does not encounter any significant settlements along its course; on average, it remains frozen from early November to mid-May.

== Hydrometry ==
Observations were recorded 40 years ago, during the 1951–1993 period, at Alexandrovsky, a small settlement located 197 kilometers from its confluence with the Yenisei.

== See also ==
- Canale Ob'-Enisej
