= Siman =

Siman (Persian: سيمان) may refer to:

== People ==
=== Given name ===
- Siman Povarenkin, Armenian entrepreneur

=== Surname ===
- Jakub Šiman
- Javier Simán
- John Siman, American water polo player
- Harry E. Siman
- Si Siman, entertainment executive
- Wado Siman, Filipino chef, entrepreneur, entertainment producer, screenwriter, and television personality

== Places ==
- Siman Island, Russia
- Siman, Kermanshah
- Siman, Razavi Khorasan

== See also ==
- Semaan
- SIMAN
