= Askino, Arkhangelsky District =

Askino Аскино
- Village
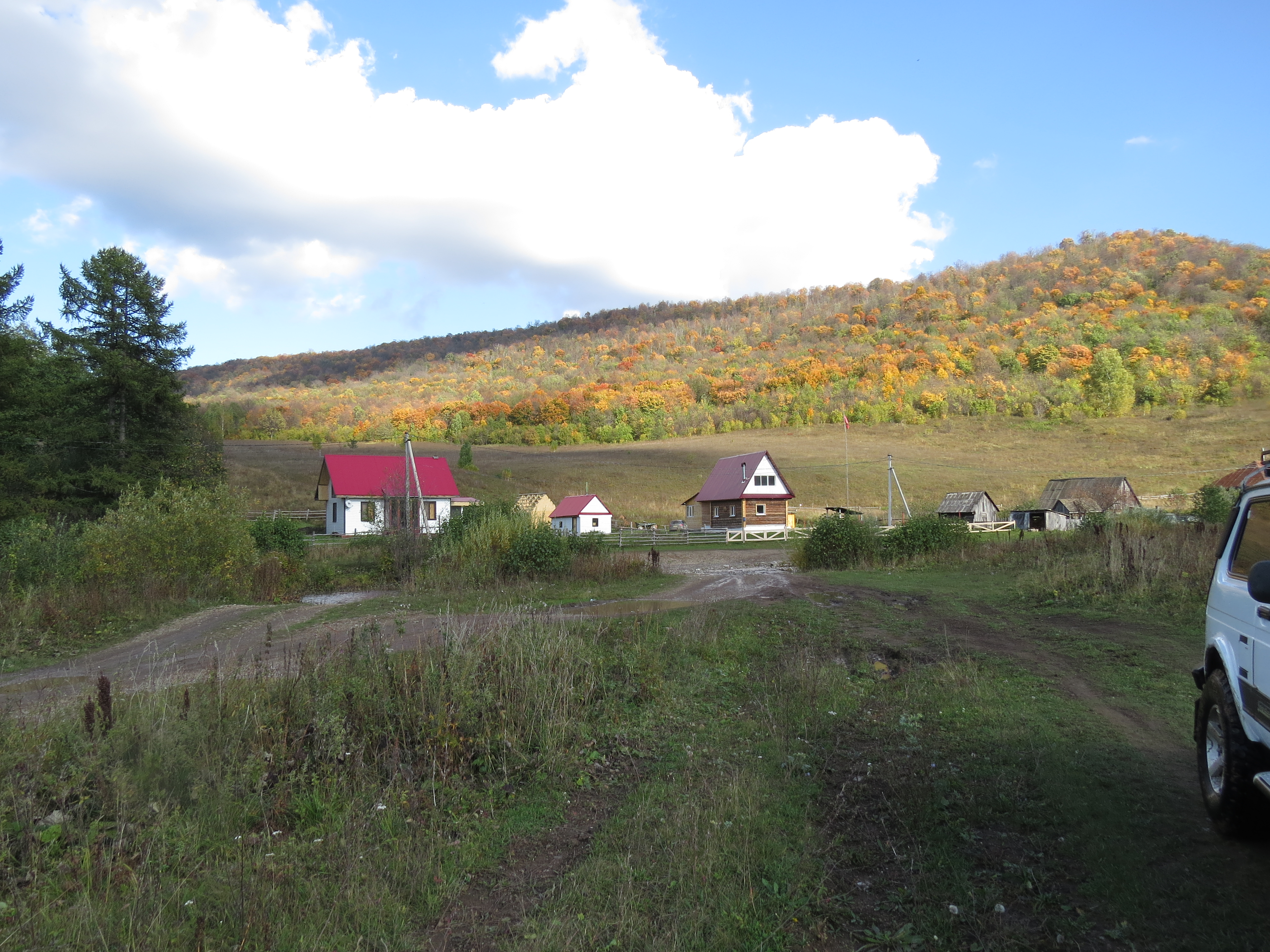
- Askino

- Location within Bashkortostan Location within Russia
- Coordinates: 54°14′N 56°52′E
- Country: Russia
- Region: Bashkortostan
- District: Arkhangelsky District

Population (2010)
  - Total: 2
- Time zone: UTC+5:00
- Postal code: 453032

Askino (Russian: Аскино; Bashkir: Асҡын, Asqın) is a rural locality (a village) in Arkh-Latyshsky Selsoviet, Arkhangelsky District, Bashkortostan, Russia. The population was 2 as of 2010. There is 1 street.

== Geography ==
Askino is located 23 km south of Arkhangelskoye (the district's administrative centre) by road. Ubalary is the nearest rural locality. The Askyn Ice Cave is located just outside of Askino
