= Bolshaya Nakhalovka =

Historical place in Zheleznodorozhny and Zayeltsovsky districts of Novosibirsk, Russia

Coordinates: 55°02′N 82°53′E

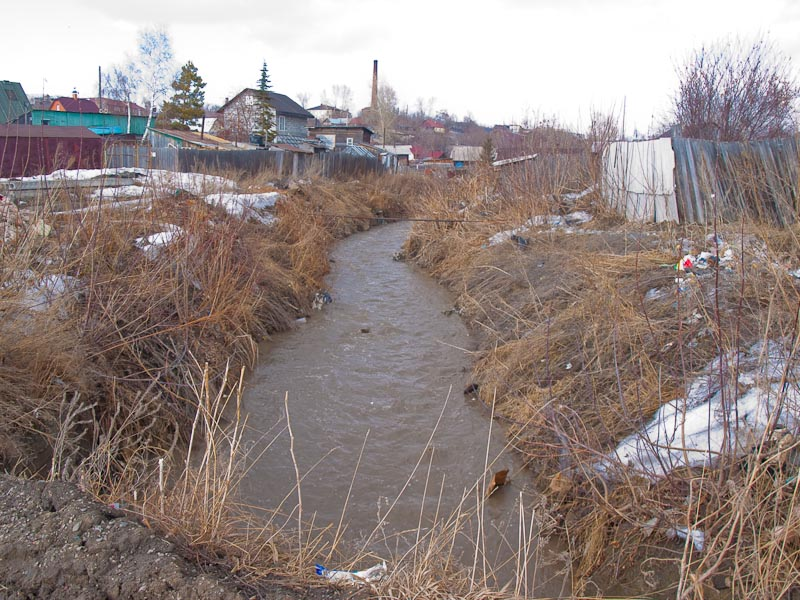
Nakhalovka near 1st Yeltsovka River

Bolshaya Nakhalovka (Russian: Большая Нахаловка) is a historical place in Zheleznodorozhny and Zayeltsovsky districts of Novosibirsk, Russia. It is arose as a result of illegal settlement at the end of the 19th century.

Nakhalovka bounded roughly by Ob River on the west, 1st Yeltsovka River on the north and Vladimirovskaya Street on the east.

== History ==
Bolshaya Nakhalovka arose in 1898—1900 as a result of the unauthorized construction of housing along the right bank of the Ob River within the land of the Cabinet of His Imperial Majesty.

Initially, people who came to find work on the railway settled in this place. But soon, the place became criminal.

Police and firefighters tried to obstruct the illegal construction of housing, they destroyed houses, but it was inconclusive. Unauthorized buildings appeared again.

In 1912, Ural businessman V. P. Zlokazov bought a plot in Nakhalovka next to the Nobel Brothers Oil Partnership and built Distillery No. 7, but the prohibition of 1914 and the prohibition of the Soviet period prevented the development of the plant. Normal conditions for the operation of the plant appeared only in 1926, then the plant also occupied premises belonging to the “Nobel Brothers Oil Partnership”.

After the October Revolution, illegal housing within Nakhalovka ceased to be illegal.

The 1920s and 1930s were economically prosperous for Nakhalovka, a network of interconnected enterprises appears here, connected by a railway branch: the chrome and skin factories processed the skin of animals, which was delivered by minecarts from the Canned Meat Plant located nearby. Residents of Nakhalovka worked at these enterprises (Oil Refinery, Rusk Factory, Oil Plant and Distillery). People had birds, cows, pigs fed with waste from the distillery.

A resident of Nakhalovka Andrei Trostnetskiy recalled:

Nakhalovka was a strange mixture of the features of a nascent industrial city and the way of rural, patriarchal life, which migrants brought from villages. You may not believe me, but in the thirties, adult girls and boys danced horovods on our streets.

After the Great Patriotic War, the life of slums fell into decay, former prisoners and fugitive criminals began to settle here. Crime in Nakhalovka has increased significantly.

== Famous Residents ==
- Nikolai Nikitin (1907–1973) is a Soviet architect, one of the creators of the Ostankino Tower. In 1919, the family of the future architect moved from Ishim to Novonikolaevsk and settled in Nakhalovka.
- Rady Shmakov (born 1931) is an engineer and shipbuilder, chief design engineer of the first- and second-generation nuclear submarines.
- Stal Shmakov (born 1931) is a philologist, professor, academician, honored teacher of Russia, doctor of pedagogical sciences, twin brother of Rady Shmakov. The brothers were born in Bolshaya Nakhalovka on Mazutnaya Street (now Surgutskaya Street).

== See also ==
- Malaya Nakhalovka

== Bibliography ==
- Маранин И. Ю., Осеев К. А. Новосибирск: Пять исчезнувших городов. Книга I. Город-вестерн. — Новосибирск: Свиньин и сыновья, 2014. — С. 137—140. — ISBN 978-5-98502-146-2.
- Ivanova, T. (1999). My Novosibirsk: A Book of Memoirs (in Russian). Novosibirsk: Detskaya Literatura. ISBN 5-08-007748-4.
