= Yuri Gurkov =

Soviet engineer

- Юрий Николаевич Гурков
- Born: 1936; Krasnoyarsk, Soviet Union
- Died: 1994 (aged 57–58); Novosibirsk, Soviet Union

Yuri Nikolayevich Gurkov (Russian: Юрий Николаевич Гурков; 1936–1994) was a Soviet bridge constructor and metro builder. He authored a number of inventions in the field of metro and bridge construction. He was responsible for the construction of Dimitrovsky Bridge and Novosibirsk Metro.

== Biography ==
He was born on June 20, 1936, in Krasnoyarsk. In 1963, he graduated from the Novosibirsk Institute of Railway Engineers with the specialty The construction of bridges and tunnels. In 1975–1979, he supervised the construction of Dimitrovsky Bridge.

From March 5, 1979, Gurkov headed an organization called Direktsiya (Дирекция), which was responsible for all construction of the Novosibirsk Metro.

He died on February 4, 1994, in Novosibirsk.

== Inventions ==
Gurkov was the author of a number of inventions in the field of metro and bridge construction, including ventilation system for metro tunnels.

== Awards ==
He was awarded the medal "For Labour Valour" and badge "Honorary Railwayman" (1986).
