= Baykalsky Priboy =

Baykalsky Priboy Байкальский Прибой
- Settlement
- Location within Republic of Buryatia Location within Russia
- Coordinates: 51°56′N 106°12′E
- Country: Russia
- Region: Republic of Buryatia
- District: Kabansky District
- Time zone: UTC+8:00

Baykalsky Priboy (Russian: Байкальский Прибой) is a rural locality (a settlement) in Kabansky District, Republic of Buryatia, Russia. The population was 118 as of 2010.

== Geography ==
Baykalsky Priboy is located 37 km (23 mi) southwest of Kabansk (the district's administrative centre) by road. Bolshaya Rechka is the nearest rural locality.
