= Shegarka =

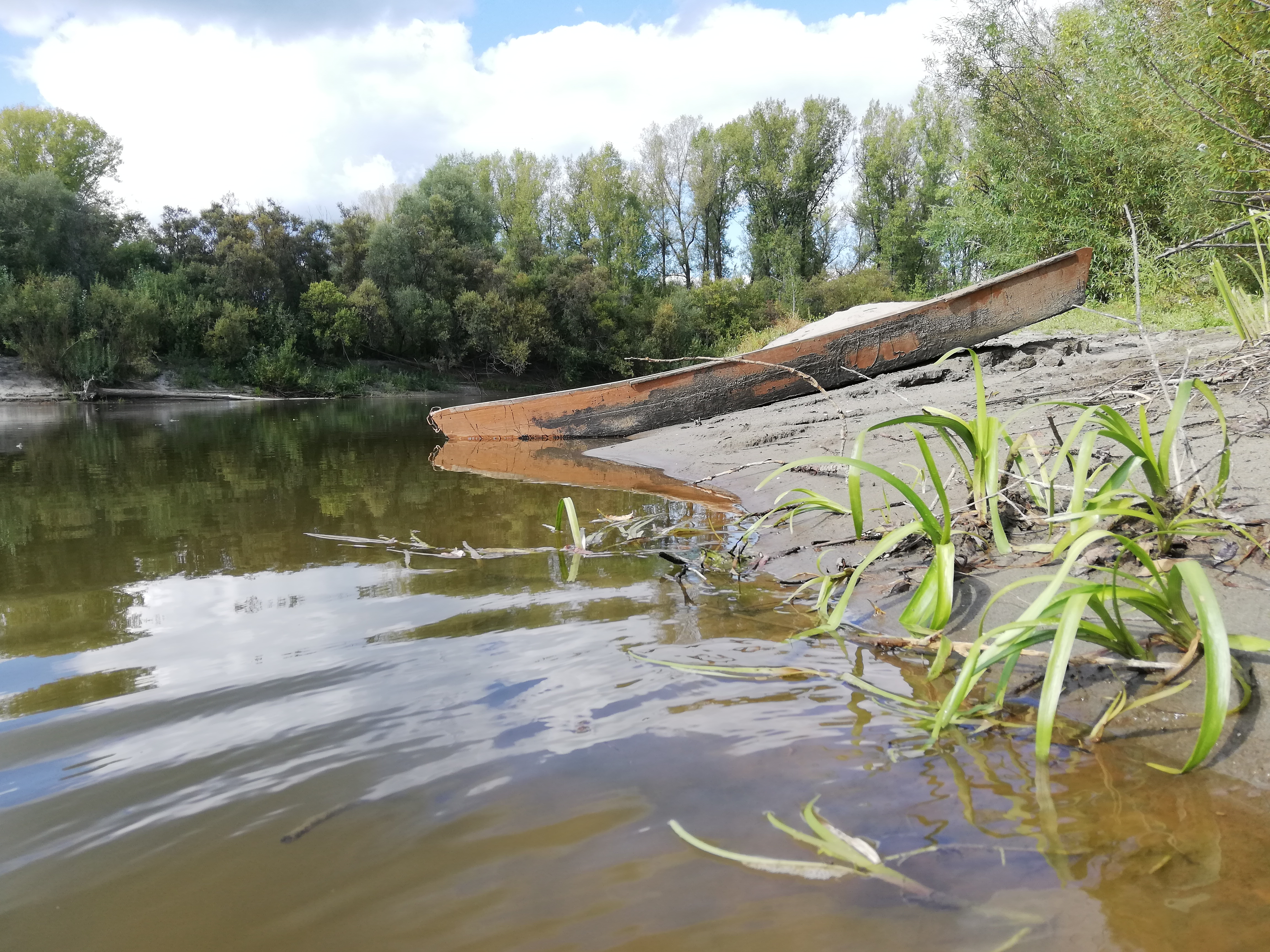

- Location within Russia

Location
- Country: Russia

Physical characteristics
- Mouth: Ob
  - coordinates: 57.251°N 84.0639°E
- Length: 382 km (237 mi)
- Basin size: 12,000 km^{2} (4,600 sq mi)

Basin features
- Progression: Ob→ Kara Sea

The Shegarka (Russian: Шегарка) is a river in Russia, a left tributary of the Ob, 382 kilometres (237 mi) long, with a basin of 12,000 square kilometres (4,600 sq mi).
