= Orlovka (Ket) =

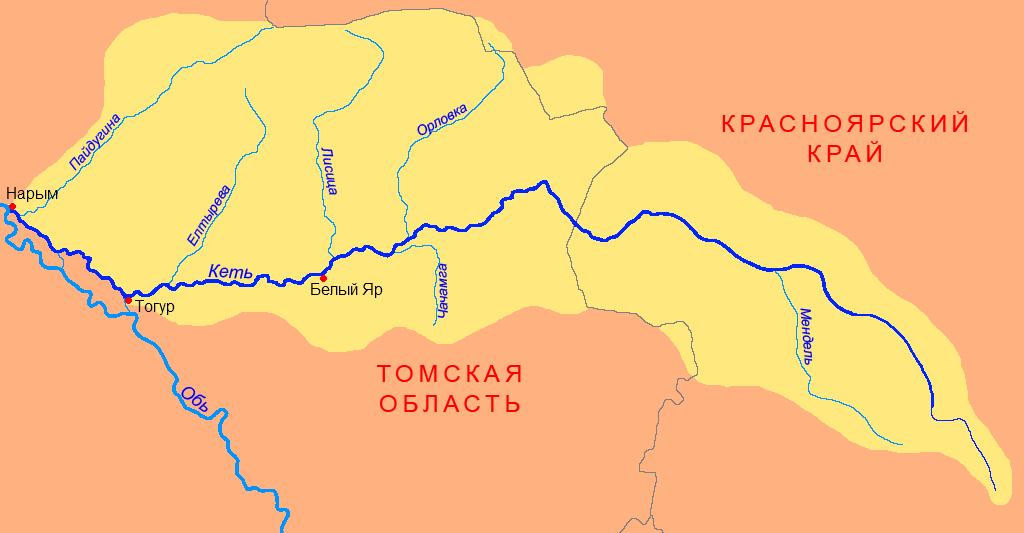

Location
- Country: Russia

Physical characteristics
- Mouth: Ket
  - coordinates: 58.6347°N 86.0753°E
- Length: 327 km (203 mi)
- Basin size: 9,010 km^{2} (3,480 sq mi)

Basin features
- Progression: Ket→ Ob→ Kara Sea

The Orlovka (Russian: Орловка) is a river in Tomsk Oblast with its origins in Krasnoyarsk Krai in Russia, a right tributary of the Ket (Ob basin). The river is 327 kilometres (203 mi) long. The area of its basin is 9,010 square kilometres (3,480 mi^{2}). The Orlovka originates from Lake Burgunku and flows over the West Siberian Plain. It freezes up in mid-October or early November and remains icebound until late April or May.
