= Orlivka =

Orlivka is the name of several populated places in Ukraine, including:

- Orlivka, Chernihiv Raion, Chernihiv Oblast
- Orlivka, Novhorod-Siverskyi Raion, Chernihiv Oblast
- Orlivka, Novohrodivka urban hromada, Pokrovsk Raion, Donetsk Oblast
- Orlivka, Ocheretyne settlement hromada, Pokrovsk Raion, Donetsk Oblast
- Orlivka, Luhansk Oblast
- Orlivka, Izmail Raion, Odesa Oblast
- Orlivka, Podilsk Raion, Odesa Oblast
- Orlivka, Sumy Oblast
- Orlivka, Vinnytsia Oblast
- Orlivka, Zaporizhzhia Oblast

A cognate placename in the Russian language is Orlovka.
