= Orlovka, Arkhangelsky District, Bashkortostan =

Orlovka Орловка
- Village
- Location within Bashkortostan Location within Russia
- Coordinates: 54°19′N 56°34′E
- Country: Russia
- Region: Bashkortostan
- District: Arkhangelsky District
- Time zone: UTC+5:00

Orlovka (Russian: Орловка) is a rural locality (a village) and the administrative center of Orlovsky Selsoviet, Arkhangelsky District, Bashkortostan, Russia. The population was 300 as of 2010. There are 5 streets.

== Geography ==
Orlovka is located 19 km southwest of Arkhangelskoye (the district's administrative centre) by road. Akkulevo is the nearest rural locality.
