= Pemboy =

Coordinates: 66°31′03″N 67°52′41″E

Location
- Country: Russia
- Federal subject: Yamalia

Physical characteristics
- Source
  - coordinates: 66°28'16"N 67°38'15"E
- Mouth
  - location: 207km from the Gulf of Ob
  - coordinates: 66°31'03.2"N 67°52'39.5"E
- Length: 19km

Pemboy (Russian: Пембой) is an river near Aksarka in Priuralsky District, Yamalo-Nenets Autonomous Okrug, Russia, its an right tributary of the Ob River 192km off the gulf of Ob. It has an lenght of 19km.

== Course ==
The Pemboy is formed in an Thermokarst 45km east of Salekhard in Yamalia, Russia
