= Malaya Nakhalovka =

Coordinates: 55°01′34″N 82°53′42″E

Malaya Nakhalovka was an illegal settlement, which was located within the modern Zheleznodorozhny District of Novosibirsk, Russia. It appeared around 1905.

== History ==
Malaya Nakhalovka arose as a result of unauthorized construction and was located south of the Resettlement Center.

It is designated as a microdistrict on the map of Novosibirsk in 1935.

Nakhalovka almost disappeared during the construction of the Dimitrovsky Bridge in the 1970s.

== See also ==
- Bolshaya Nakhalovka

== Bibliography ==
- Маранин И. Ю., Осеев К. А. Новосибирск: Пять исчезнувших городов. Книга I. Город-вестерн. — Новосибирск: Свиньин и сыновья, 2014. — С. 142–143. — ISBN 978-5-98502-146-2.
