= Tym (Ob) =

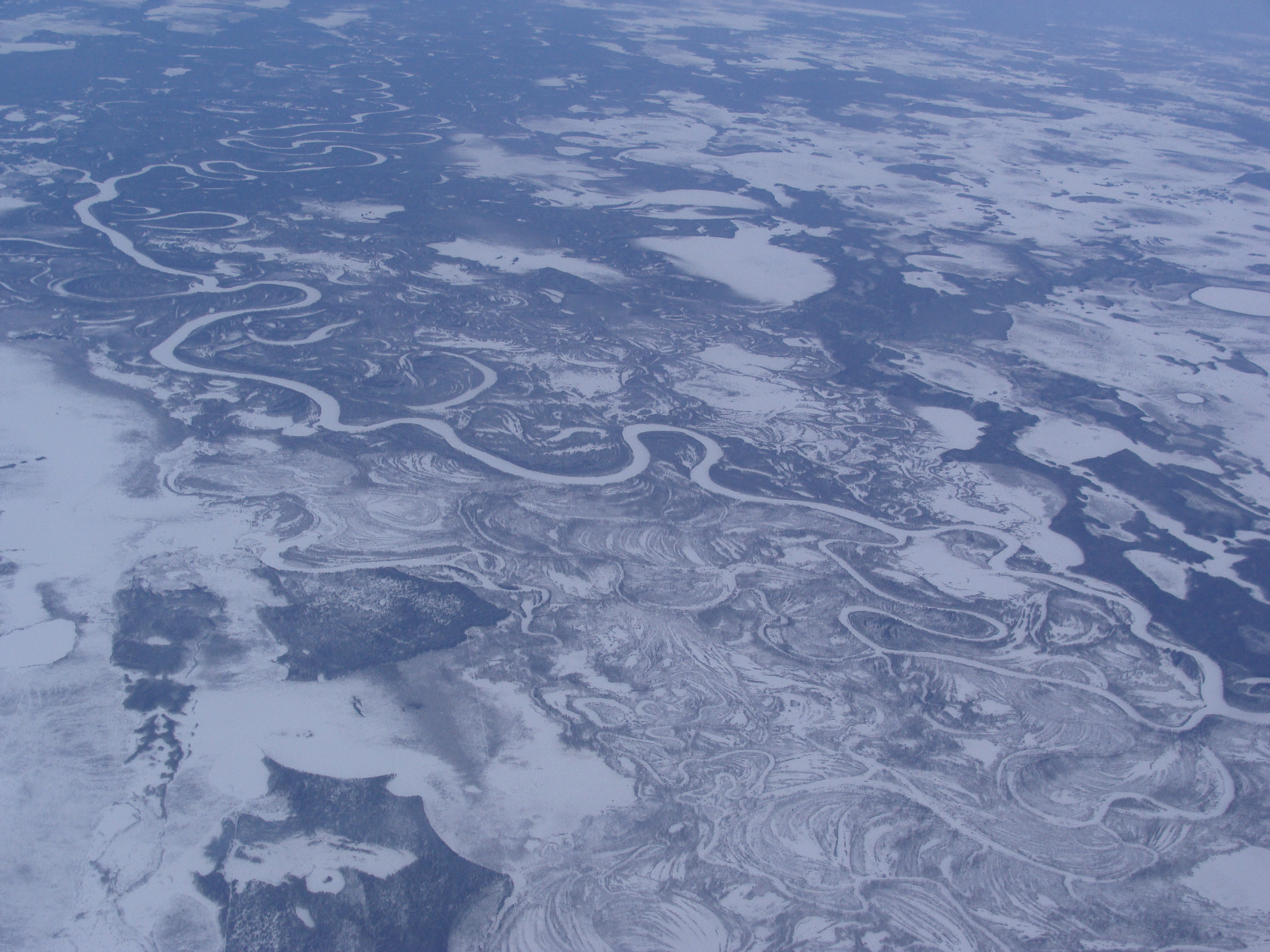
- Native name: Тым (Russian)

Location
- Country: Russia

Physical characteristics
- Mouth: Ob
  - coordinates: 59.4319°N 80.0278°E
- Length: 950 km (590 mi)
- Basin size: 32,300 km^{2} (12,500 sq mi)

Basin features
- Progression: Ob→ Kara Sea

The Tym (Russian: Тым) is a river in Krasnoyarsk Krai and Tomsk Oblast in Russia, right tributary of the Ob. The length of the river is 950 kilometres (590 mi), and it drains a basin of 32,300 square kilometres (12,500 mi^{2}). The Tym freezes up in October to early November and stays icebound until late April to May. It is navigable within 560 kilometres (350 mi) of its estuary.
