= Orlovka, Belebeyevsky District, Republic of Bashkortostan =

Orlovka Орловка
- Village
- Location within Bashkortostan Location within Russia
- Coordinates: 54°13′N 54°00′E
- Country: Russia
- Region: Bashkortostan
- District: Belebeyevsky District
- Time zone: UTC+5:00

Orlovka (Russian: Орловка) is a rural locality (a village) in Annovsky Selsoviet, Belebeyevsky District, Bashkortostan, Russia. The population was 4 as of 2010. There is 1 street.

== Geography ==
Orlovka is located 24 km north of Belebey (the district's administrative centre) by road. Savkino is the nearest rural locality.
