= Krasnaya Orlovka =

Krasnaya Orlovka Красная Орловка
- Selo
- Location within Amur Oblast Location within Russia
- Coordinates: 49°36′N 128°46′E
- Country: Russia
- Region: Amur Oblast
- District: Mikhaylovsky District
- Time zone: UTC+9:00

Krasnaya Orlovka (Russian: Красная Орловка) is a rural locality (a selo) in Chesnokovsky Selsoviet of Mikhaylovsky District, Amur Oblast, Russia. The population was 129 as of 2018. There are 5 streets.

== Geography ==
Krasnaya Orlovka is located on the left bank of the Amur River, 10 km southeast of Poyarkovo (the district's administrative centre) by road. Shadrino is the nearest rural locality.
