= Orlovka, Iglinsky District, Republic of Bashkortostan =

Orlovka Орловка
- Village
- Location within Bashkortostan Location within Russia
- Coordinates: 55°00′N 57°06′E
- Country: Russia
- Region: Bashkortostan
- District: Iglinsky District
- Time zone: UTC+5:00

Orlovka (Russian: Орловка) is a rural locality (a village) in Krasnovoskhodsky Selsoviet, Iglinsky District, Bashkortostan, Russia. The population was 90 as of 2010. There is 1 street.

== Geography ==
Orlovka is located 77 km northeast of Iglino (the district's administrative centre) by road. Tyulko-Tamak is the nearest rural locality.
