= Orlovka, Blagoveshchensky District, Republic of Bashkortostan =

Orlovka Орловка
- Selo
- Location within Bashkortostan Location within Russia
- Coordinates: 55°11′N 55°59′E
- Country: Russia
- Region: Bashkortostan
- District: Blagoveshchensky District
- Time zone: UTC+5:00

Orlovka (Russian: Орловка) is a rural locality (a selo) and the administrative centre of Orlovsky Selsoviet, Blagoveshchensky District, Bashkortostan, Russia. The population was 102 as of 2010. There are 3 streets.

== Geography ==
Orlovka is located 26 km north of Blagoveshchensk (the district's administrative centre) by road. Truzhenik is the nearest rural locality.
