= Orlovka, Arkharinsky District, Amur Oblast =

Orlovka Орловка
- Selo
- Location within Amur Oblast Location within Russia
- Coordinates: 49°18′N 130°00′E
- Country: Russia
- Region: Amur Oblast
- District: Arkharinsky District
- Time zone: UTC+9:00

Orlovka (Russian: Орловка) is a rural locality (a selo) in Volnensky Selsoviet of Arkharinsky District, Amur Oblast, Russia. The population was 41 as of 2018. There are 2 streets.

== Geography ==
Orlovka is located on the right bank of the Arkhara River, 18 km southwest of Arkhara (the district's administrative centre) by road. Volnoye is the nearest rural locality.
