= Ob–Yenisei Canal =

Coordinates: 59°12′N 88°34′E

The Ob–Yenisei Canal, also known as the Ket-Kas Canal, is a disused waterway that connected the basins of the rivers Ob and Yenisei in Siberia.

== Location ==
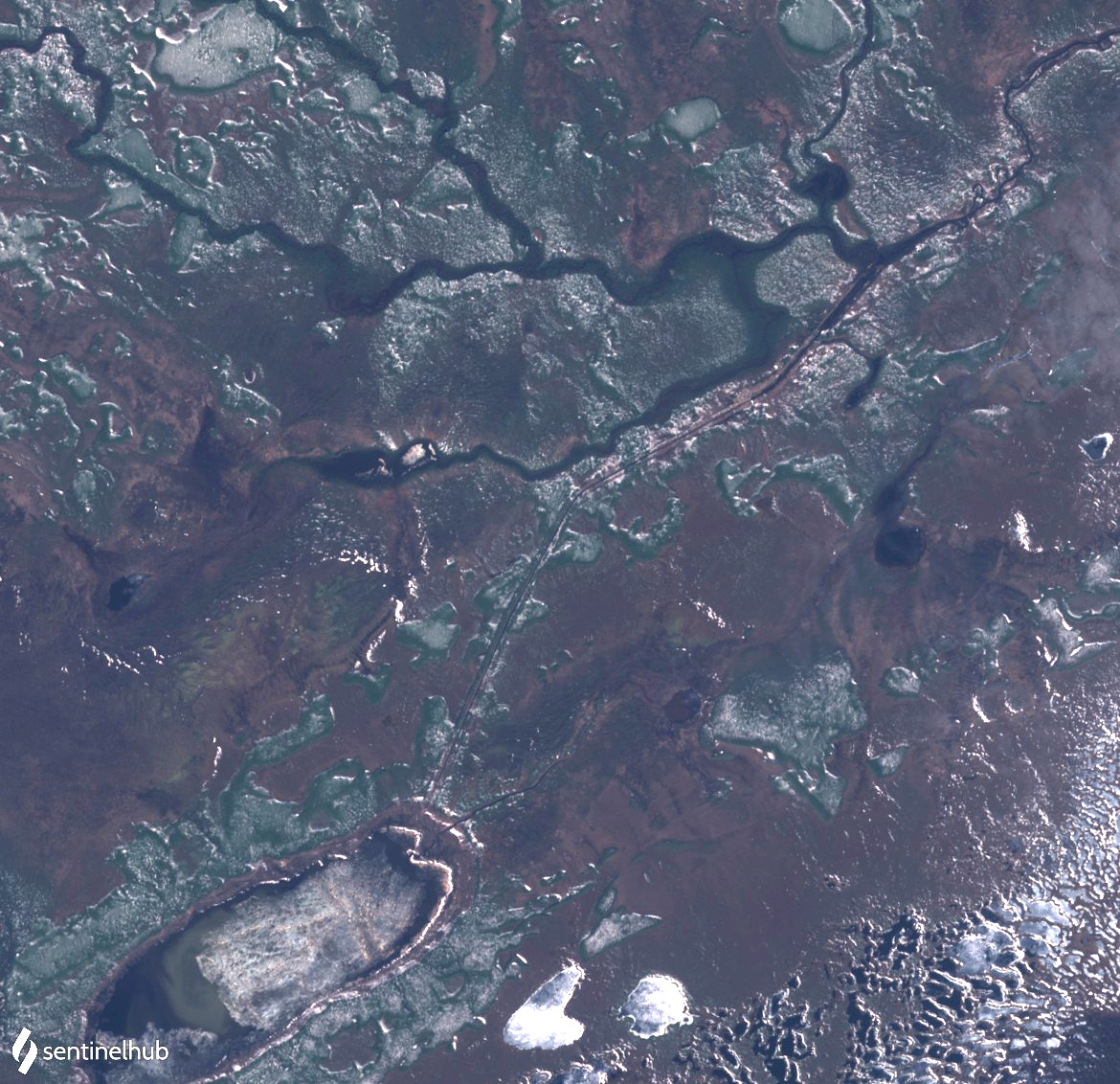
Satellite imagery of canal (2019)

The waterway connected the Ket River, a tributary of the Ob with the Greater Kas River, a tributary of the Yenisei, making use of their tributaries and lakes. The divide between the two river systems (which is also the border between today's Tomsk Oblast and Krasnoyarsk Krai) is spanned by a hand-dug canal 8 km long, 20 m wide at the bottom, and 2.1 m (7 feet) deep.

== History ==
The canal was built in a period between 1882 and 1891, but was too shallow and narrow to compete with the Trans-Siberian Railway.

Plans to improve the canal were considered around 1911, but were abandoned due to the beginning of the First World War. The canal was severely damaged during the Civil War, and closed for navigation in 1921.

The canal was used one more time in 1942, when three steamboats and a cutter managed to make their way from the Yenisei to the Ob, but the passage was extremely difficult.

The canal is now fully abandoned. It is occasionally reached by tourists using canoes, cars, or bicycles, or on foot.
