= Orlovka, Fyodorovsky District, Republic of Bashkortostan =

Orlovka Орловка
- Village
- Location within Bashkortostan Location within Russia
- Coordinates: 53°18′N 55°03′E
- Country: Russia
- Region: Bashkortostan
- District: Fyodorovsky District
- Time zone: UTC+5:00

Orlovka (Russian: Орловка) is a rural locality (a village) in Tenyayevsky Selsoviet, Fyodorovsky District, Bashkortostan, Russia. The population was 152 as of 2010. There are 6 streets.

== Geography ==
Orlovka is located 19 km northwest of Fyodorovka (the district's administrative centre) by road. Kazanka is the nearest rural locality.
