= Orlovka, Yanaulsky District, Republic of Bashkortostan =

Orlovka Орловка
- Selo
- Location within Bashkortostan Location within Russia
- Coordinates: 56°05′N 55°09′E
- Country: Russia
- Region: Bashkortostan
- District: Yanaulsky District
- Time zone: UTC+5:00

Orlovka (Russian: Орловка) is a rural locality (a selo) and the administrative centre of Orlovsky Selsoviet, Yanaulsky District, Bashkortostan, Russia. The population was 374 as of 2010. There are 3 streets.

== Geography ==
Orlovka is located 26 km southeast of Yanaul (the district's administrative centre) by road. Yamyady is the nearest rural locality.
