= Orlovka, Uchalinsky District, Republic of Bashkortostan =

Orlovka Орловка
- Village
- Location within Bashkortostan Location within Russia
- Coordinates: 54°45′N 59°47′E
- Country: Russia
- Region: Bashkortostan
- District: Uchalinsky District
- Time zone: UTC+5:00

Orlovka (Russian: Орловка) is a rural locality (a village) in Ilchigulovsky Selsoviet, Uchalinsky District, Bashkortostan, Russia. The population was 243 in 2010. There are seven streets.

== Geography ==
Orlovka is located 67 km northeast of Uchaly (the district's administrative centre) by road. Ilchigulovo is the nearest rural locality.
