= Orlovka, Karmaskalinsky District, Republic of Bashkortostan =

Orlovka Орловка
- Village
- Location within Bashkortostan Location within Russia
- Coordinates: 54°22′N 55°48′E
- Country: Russia
- Region: Bashkortostan
- District: Karmaskalinsky District
- Time zone: UTC+5:00

Orlovka (Russian: Орловка) is a rural locality (a village) in Podlubovsky Selsoviet, Karmaskalinsky District, Bashkortostan, Russia. The population was 378 as of 2010. There are 4 streets.

== Geography ==
Orlovka is located 38 km west of Karmaskaly (the district's administrative centre) by road. Podlubovo is the nearest rural locality.
