= Orlovka, Altai Krai =

Orlovka Орловка
- Selo
- Location within Altai Krai Location within Russia
- Coordinates: 52°36′N 78°35′E
- Country: Russia
- Region: Altai Krai
- District: Kulundinsky District
- Time zone: UTC+7:00

Orlovka (Russian: Орловка) is a rural locality (a selo) in Oktyabrsky Selsoviet, Kulundinsky District, Altai Krai, Russia. The population was 97 as of 2013. There are 2 streets.

== Geography ==
Orlovka is located 29 km northwest of Kulunda (the district's administrative centre) by road. Novoznamenka is the nearest rural locality.
