= Orlovka, Vladimir Oblast =

Orlovka Орловка
- Village
- Location within Vladimir Oblast Location within Russia
- Coordinates: 55°32′N 41°45′E
- Country: Russia
- Region: Vladimir Oblast
- District: Melenkovsky District
- Time zone: UTC+3:00

Orlovka (Russian: Орловка) is a rural locality (a village) in Denyatinskoye Rural Settlement, Melenkovsky District, Vladimir Oblast, Russia. The population was 36 as of 2010. There are 4 streets.

== Geography ==
Orlovka is located 28 km north of Melenki (the district's administrative centre) by road. Papulino is the nearest rural locality.
