= Orlovka, Konstantinovsky District, Amur Oblast =

Orlovka Орловка
- Selo
- Location within Amur Oblast Location within Russia
- Coordinates: 49°33′N 128°07′E
- Country: Russia
- Region: Amur Oblast
- District: Konstantinovsky District
- Time zone: UTC+9:00

Orlovka (Russian: Орловка) is a rural locality (a selo) in Orlovsky Selsoviet of Konstantinovsky District, Amur Oblast, Russia. The population was 281 as of 2018. There are 6 streets.

== Geography ==
Orlovka is located on the left bank of the Amur River, 12 km southeast of Konstantinovka (the district's administrative centre) by road. Konstantinovka is the nearest rural locality.
