= Dimitrovsky Bridge, Novosibirsk =

Dimitrovsky Bridge
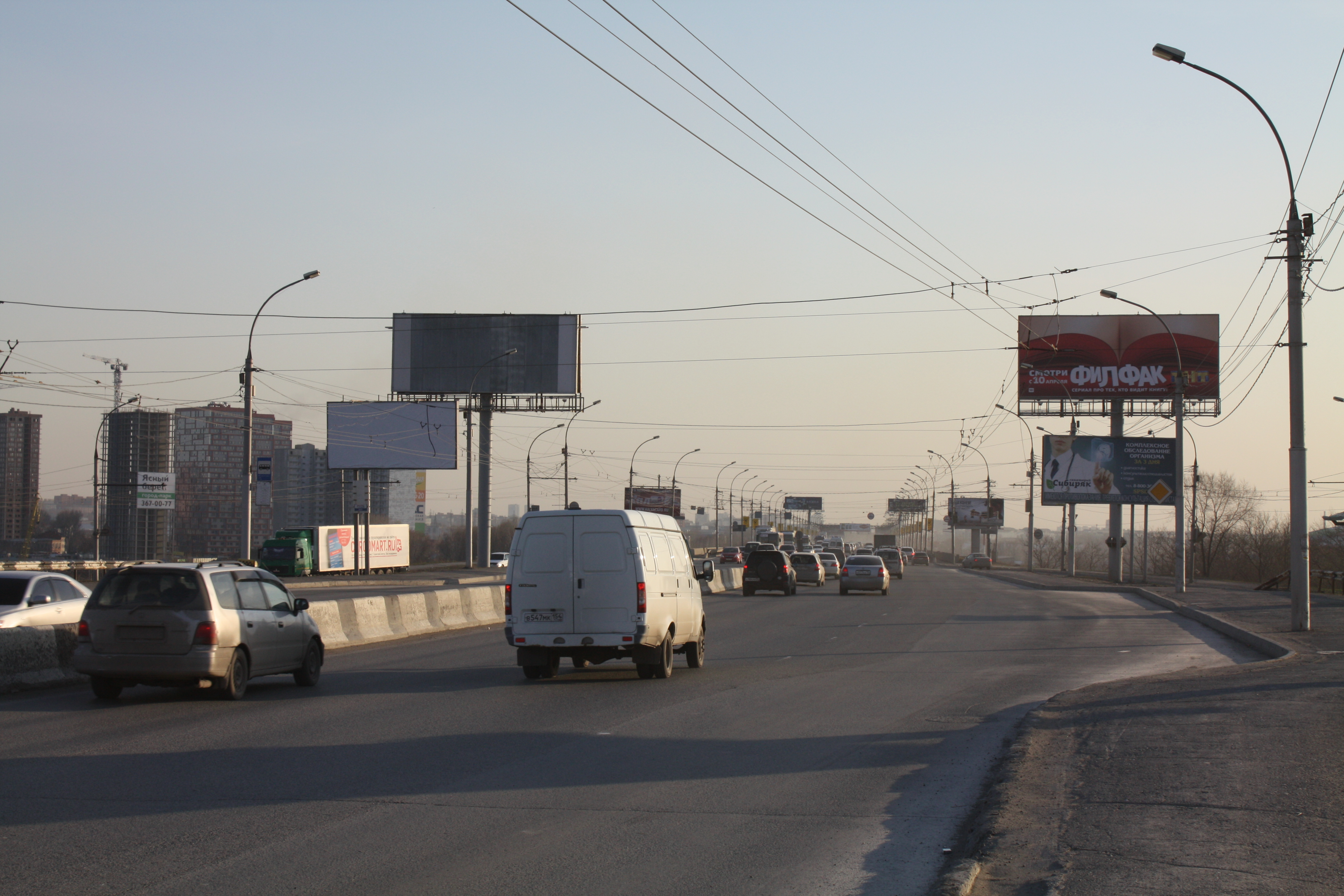
- Coordinates: 55°01′17″N 82°53′37″E
- Crosses: Ob River
- Locale: Novosibirsk, Russia

Characteristics
- Total length: 701 m
- Width: 30 m

History
- Opened: 1978

Location
- Interactive map of Dimitrovsky Bridge

The Dimitrovsky Bridge or Dimitrov Bridge (Russian: Димитровский мост, Dimitrovsky Most) is an automobile bridge over the Ob River, connecting the Zheleznodorozhny and Leninsky districts of Novosibirsk, Russia.

== History ==
The Bridge was built by Sibmost Company. It was opened on 4 November 1978. The cost of construction amounted to 20 million rubles. Malaya Nakhalovka district was located in the surrounding area.
