= Orlovka, Alsheyevsky District, Republic of Bashkortostan =

Orlovka Орловка
- Village
- Location within Bashkortostan Location within Russia
- Coordinates: 53°46′N 55°22′E
- Country: Russia
- Region: Bashkortostan
- District: Alsheyevsky District
- Time zone: UTC+5:00

Orlovka (Russian: Орловка) is a rural locality (a village) in Kysylsky Selsoviet, Alsheyevsky District, Bashkortostan, Russia. The population was 51 as of 2010. There is 1 street.

== Geography ==
Orlovka is located 14 km south of Rayevsky (the district's administrative centre) by road.
