= Siman Island =

Island on Ob River, Russia

Native name: Симан
- Interactive map of Siman Island

Geography
- Location: Ob River
- Coordinates: 55°52′27″N 83°46′25″E

Administration
- Russia

Siman Island (Russian: Симан) is a large island in the Ob River. It is located in Novosibirsk and Tomsk oblasts.

The island is about 45 km long and 15 km wide.

== History ==
In the past, Lugovaya Village was located on the island, founded in the 1850s.

== Population ==
Since 2013, one person lives on the island (disabled person).
