= Orlovka, Bakalinsky District, Republic of Bashkortostan =

Orlovka Орловка
- Village
- Location within Bashkortostan Location within Russia
- Coordinates: 55°03′N 53°50′E
- Country: Russia
- Region: Bashkortostan
- District: Bakalinsky District
- Time zone: UTC+5:00

Orlovka (Russian: Орловка) is a rural locality (a village) in Mikhaylovsky Selsoviet, Bakalinsky District, Bashkortostan, Russia. As of 2010 the recorded population was at 82. There are 2 streets.

== Geography ==
Orlovka is located 26 km south of Bakaly (the district's administrative centre) by road. Budennovets is the nearest rural locality.
