= Bolshaya Rechka =

Bolshaya Rechka Большая Речка
- Urban-type settlement
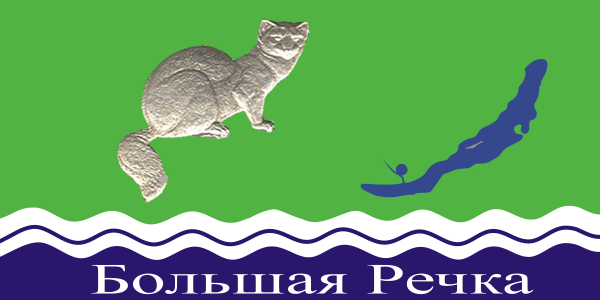
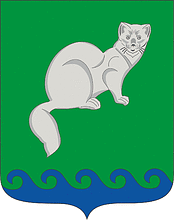
- Flag Coat of arms
- Interactive map of Bolshaya Rechka
- Location of Bolshaya Rechka Bolshaya Rechka (Irkutsk Oblast)
- Coordinates: 51.9498°N 104.7379°E
- Country: Russia
- Federal subject: Irkutsk Oblast
- Administrative district: Irkutsky District
- Elevation: 499 m (1,637 ft)

Population (2010 Census)
  - Total: 2,627
  - Estimate (2025): 2,670 (+1.6%)
- Time zone: UTC+8 (MSK+5)
- Postal code: 664518
- OKTMO ID: 25612155051

Bolshaya Rechka (Russian: Большая Речка) is an urban locality (an urban-type settlement) in Irkutsky District of Irkutsk Oblast, Russia. Population: 2,627 (2010 census); 2,431 (2002 census); 2,225 (1989 Soviet census).
