= Ob =

Major river in Siberia

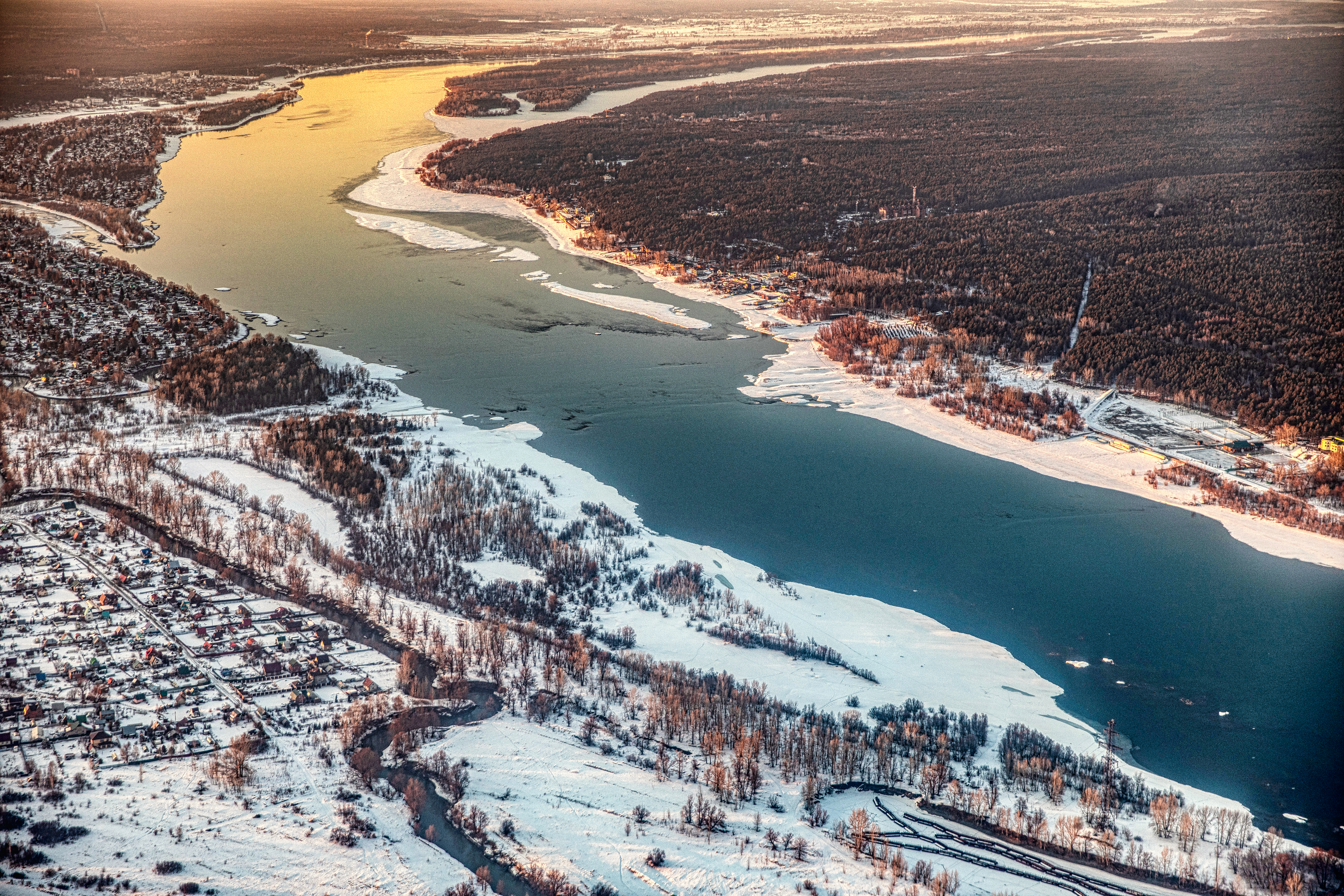
- The Ob in Novosibirsk

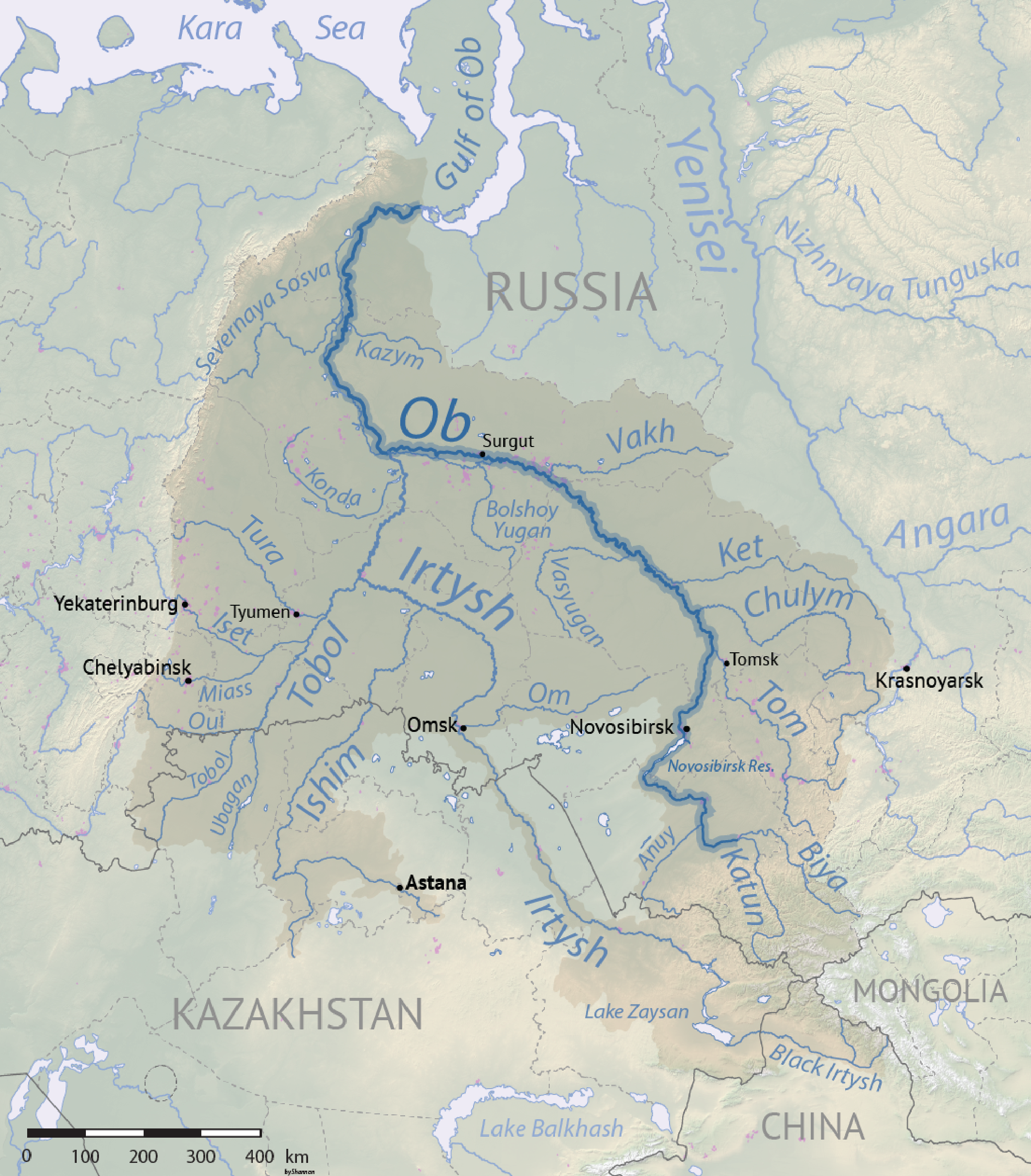
- Map of the Ob River watershed
- Native name: А̄с-я̄ (Mansi); Обь (Russian)

Location
- Country: Russia
- Region: Altai Krai, Novosibirsk Oblast, Tomsk Oblast, Khanty-Mansi Autonomous Okrug, Yamalia
- Cities: Biysk, Barnaul, Novosibirsk, Nizhnevartovsk, Surgut

Physical characteristics
- Source: Katun
  - location: Belukha Mountain, Altai Republic
  - coordinates: 49°45′0″N 86°34′0″E
  - elevation: 2,300 m (7,500 ft)
- 2nd source: Biya
  - location: Lake Teletskoye, Altai Republic
  - coordinates: 51°47′11″N 87°14′49″E
  - elevation: 434 m (1,424 ft)
- 3rd source: Most distant source: Ob-Irtysh system
  - location: near Mang-tai-ch’ia-ta-fan pass, Altai Mountains, Xinjiang, China
  - coordinates: 47°52′39″N 89°58′12″E
  - elevation: 2,960 m (9,710 ft)
- Source confluence: Near Biysk
  - location: Altai Krai
  - coordinates: 52°25′54″N 85°01′26″E
  - elevation: 195 m (640 ft)
- Mouth: Gulf of Ob
  - location: Ob Delta, Yamalia
  - coordinates: 66°32′02″N 71°23′41″E
  - elevation: 0 m (0 ft)
- Length: 3,700 km (2,300 mi)
- Basin size: 2,972,497 km^{2} (1,147,688 mi^{2}) to 2,994,238 km^{2} (1,156,082 mi^{2})
- Width
  - minimum: 140 m (460 ft)
  - average: 3,000 m (9,800 ft)
  - maximum: 19,000 m (62,000 ft)
- Depth
  - average: 9 m (30 ft)
  - maximum: 40 m (130 ft)
- Discharge
  - location: Salekhard (Basin size: 2,917,508 km^{2} (1,126,456 sq mi))
  - average: 12,889 m^{3}/s (455,200 cu ft/s) (Period of data: 1971–2015) 12,475.1 m^{3}/s (440,550 cu ft/s) (Period of data: 1930–1984) 13,500 m^{3}/s (480,000 cu ft/s) (Period of data: 1999–2008)
  - minimum: 2,360 m^{3}/s (83,000 cu ft/s)
  - maximum: 40,200 m^{3}/s (1,420,000 cu ft/s)
- Discharge
  - location: Ob Estuary, Gulf of Ob (Kara Sea), Russia
  - average: 402 km^{3}/a (12,700 m^{3}/s) (Period of data: 1940–2017) 414 km^{3}/a (13,100 m^{3}/s) (Period of data: 1984–2018)

Basin features
- Tributaries
  - left: Katun, Anuy, Charysh, Aley, Parabel, Vasyugan, Irtysh, Severnaya Sosva
  - right: Biya, Berd, Inya, Tom, Chulym, Ket, Tym, Vakh, Pim, Kazym

The Ob (/ˈɒb/; Russian: Обь) is a major river in Russia. It is in western Siberia, and with its tributary the Irtysh forms the world's seventh-longest river system, at 5,410 kilometres (3,360 mi). The Ob forms at the confluence of the Biya and Katun which have their origins in the Altai Mountains. It is the westernmost of the three great Siberian rivers that flow into the Arctic Ocean (the other two being the Yenisei and the Lena). Its flow is north-westward, then northward.

The main city on its banks is Novosibirsk, the largest city in Siberia, and the third-largest city in Russia. It is where the Trans-Siberian Railway crosses the river.

The Gulf of Ob is the world's longest estuary.

== Names ==
The internationally known name of the river is based on the Russian name Obʹ (Russian: Обь, IPA: [opʲ]), possibly from Proto-Indo-Iranian *Hā́p- ('river, water'; compare Vedic Sanskrit áp-, Persian āb, Tajik ob, and Pashto obə, 'water'). Katz (1990) proposes Komi ob ('river') as the immediate source of derivation for the Russian name. Katz's proposal of a common Finno-Ugric root, borrowed early on from a pre-Indo-Iranian source related to Sanskrit ambhas- ('water') is deemed improbable by Rédei (1992), who prefers to analyse this as a later loan from a descendant of the non-nasal root form *Hā́p-.

The Ob is known to the Khanty people as the As (the source of the name Ostyak), Yag, Kolta and Yema; to the Nenets people as the Kolta or Kuay; and to the Siberian Tatars as the Umar or Omass.

== Geography ==
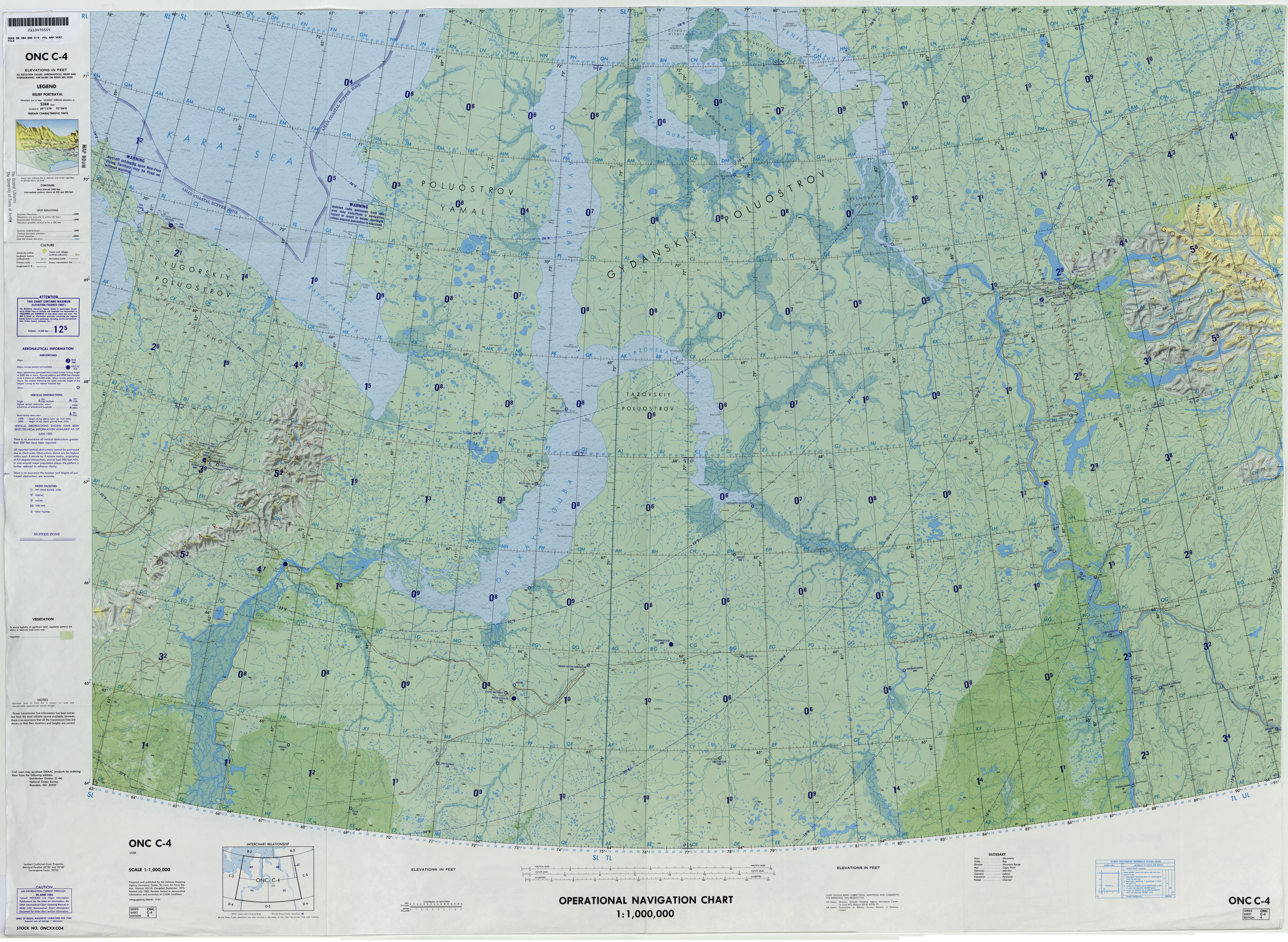
Map including the mouth of the Ob River

The Ob forms 25 km (16 mi) southwest of Biysk in Altai Krai at the confluence of the Biya and Katun rivers. Both these streams have their origin in the Altai Mountains, which gradually give way to the Ob Plateau. The Biya has its sources in Lake Teletskoye and the 700 kilometres (430 mi) long Katun in a glacier on Mount Byelukha.

The Ob itself is in Russia. Its tributaries extend into northern Kazakhstan, a western corner of China and a tiny upland parcel of the western tip of Mongolia, where the wider borders match the drainage basin almost precisely. The river splits into more than one arm after the large Irtysh flows into it at about 69° E. Originating in China, the Irtysh is the furthest source of the Ob. From their respective sources to the confluence, the Irtysh measures 4,248 kilometers (2,640 mi) and the Ob 2,538 km (1,577 mi). Other noteworthy tributaries are: from the east, the Tom, Chulym, Ket, Tym and Vakh rivers; and, from the west and south, the Vasyugan, Irtysh (with the Ishim and Tobol rivers), and Severnaya Sosva.

The Ob zigzags west and north until it reaches 55° N, where it curves to the northwest, south of the Siberian Uvaly, at the western end of which it bends northwards, wheeling finally eastwards into the Gulf of Ob, a 1,000-kilometre-long (620-mile) bay of the Kara Sea, separating the Yamal Peninsula from the Gyda Peninsula.

The combined Ob-Irtysh system, the fourth-longest river system of Asia (after Yenisei, and China's Yangzi and Yellow rivers), is 5,410 kilometres (3,360 mi) long, and the area of its basin 2,990,000 square kilometres (1,150,000 mi^{2}). The river basin of the Ob consists mostly of steppe, taiga, swamps, tundra, and semi-desert topography. The floodplains of the Ob are characterised by many tributaries and lakes. The Ob is icebound at southern Barnaul from early in November to near the end of April, and at northern Salekhard, 150 km (93 mi) above its mouth, from the end of October to the beginning of June. The Ob River crosses several climatic zones. The upper Ob valley, in the south, supports grapes, melons and watermelons, whereas the lower reaches of the Ob are Arctic tundra. The most temperate climates on the Ob are at Biysk, Barnaul, and Novosibirsk.

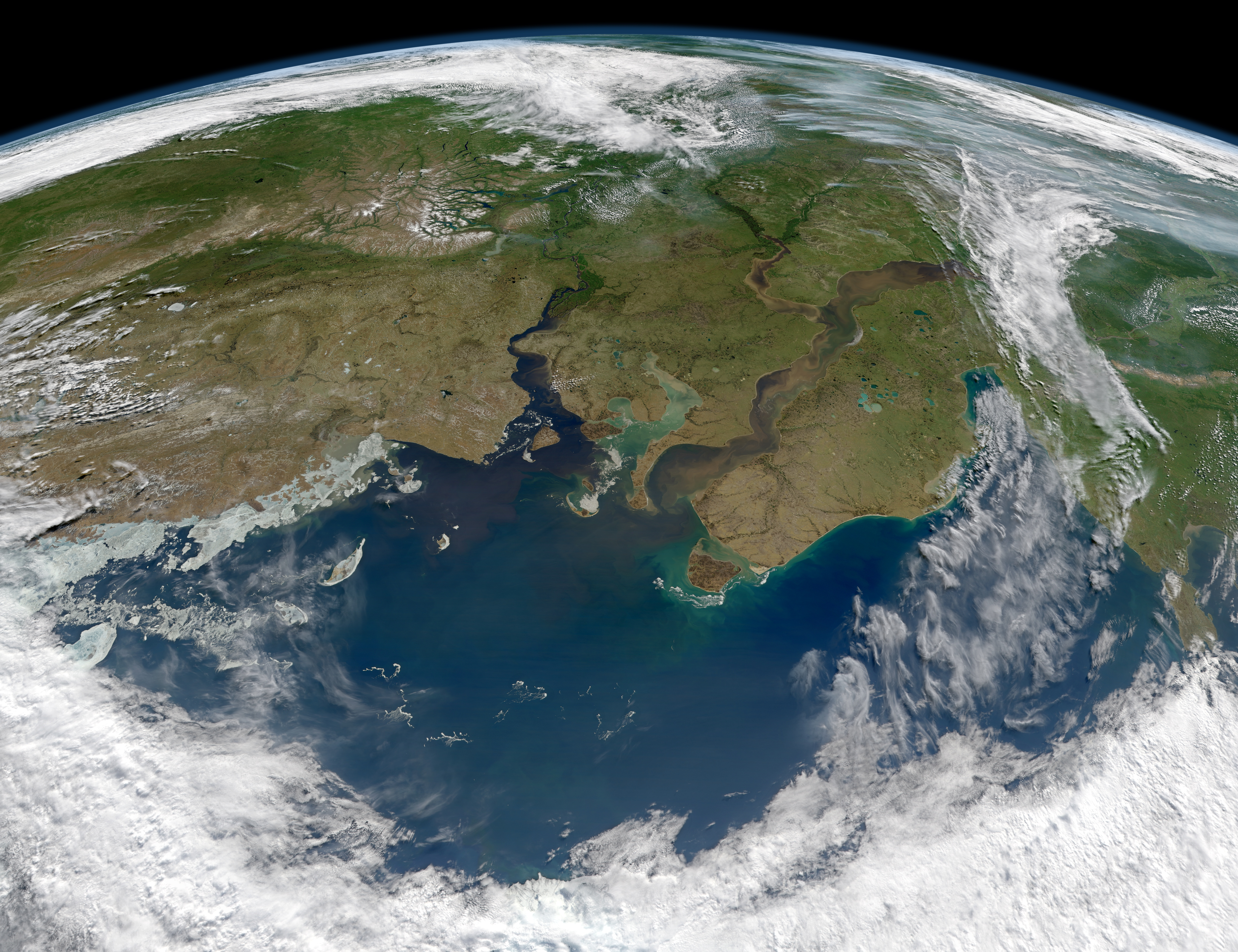
Yenisei and Ob (right) flow into Kara Sea

== Human use ==
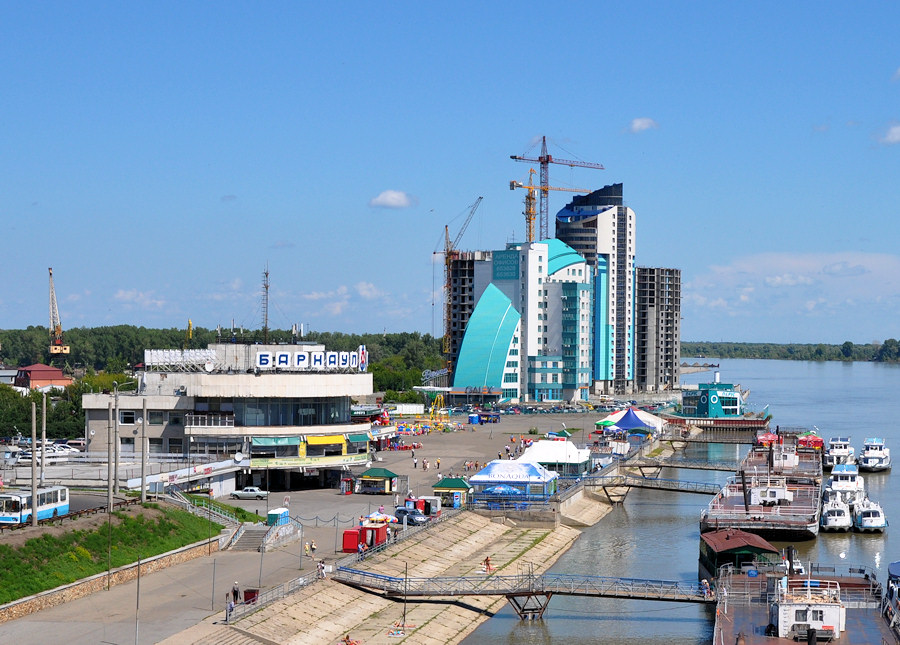
The Ob River in Barnaul

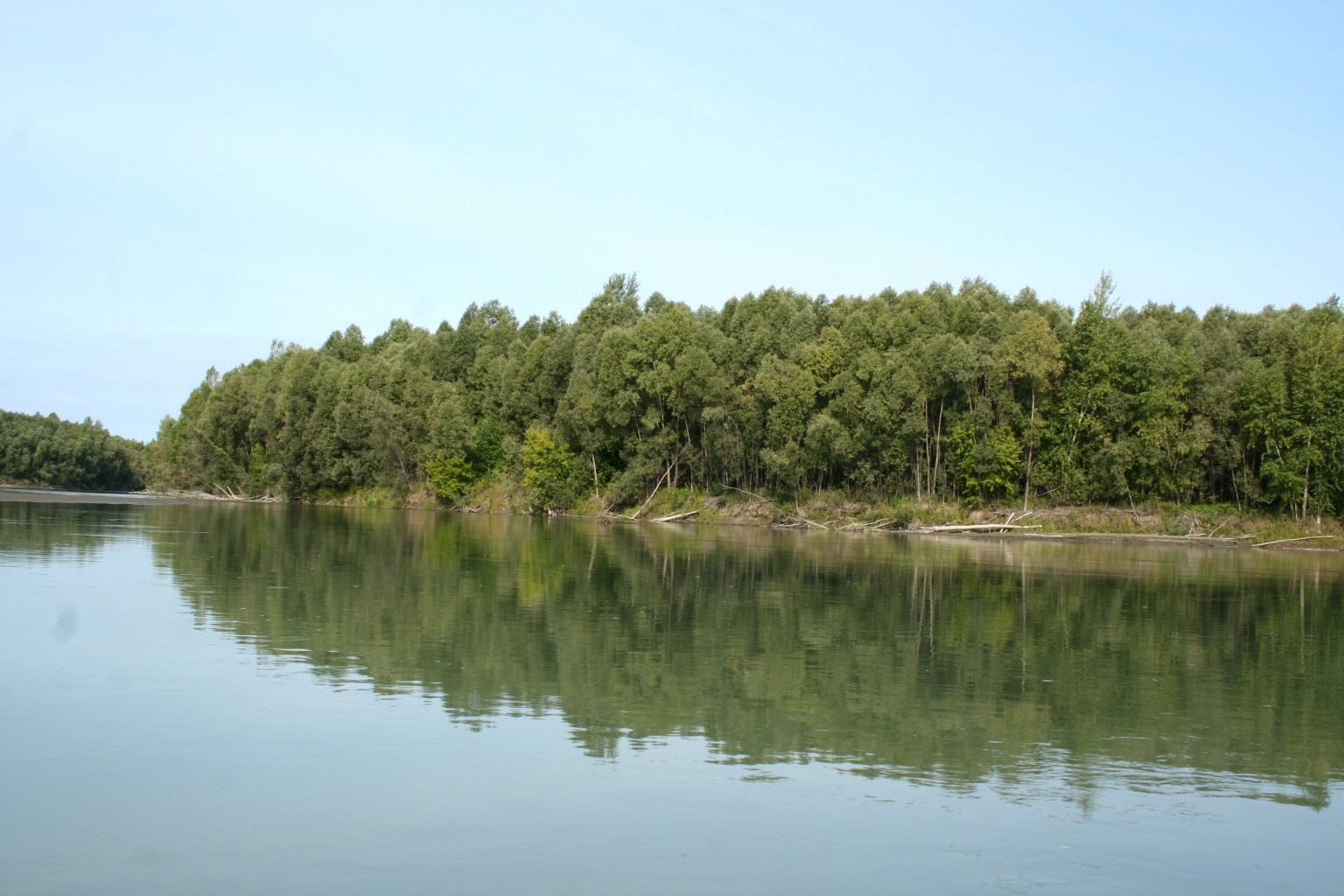
A section of the Ob River

The Ob provides irrigation, drinking water, hydroelectric energy, and fishing (the river hosts more than 50 species of fish).

There are several hydroelectric power plants along the Ob river, the largest being Novosibirskaya GES.

The navigable waters within the Ob basin reach a total length of 15,000 km (9,300 mi). The importance of navigation in the Ob basin for transport was particularly great before the completion of the Trans-Siberian Railway, since, despite the general south-to-north direction of the flow of Ob and most of its tributaries, the width of the Ob basin provided for (somewhat indirect) transport in the east–west direction as well.

=== History ===
The Novgorodians were aware of the lands of western Siberia from at least the 11th century, which were designated by the Russian word Yugra. Novgorod established two trade routes to the Ob River, both starting from the town of Ustyug. The first route went along the Sukhona and Vychegda, then along the Usa to the lower reaches of the Ob. The second route went down the Northern Dvina, then along the coasts of the White Sea and Kara Sea, before reaching the mouth of the Ob.

The Russian settlements of Beryozov and Obdorsk were founded towards the end of the 16th century on the lower reaches of the Ob, while Surgut was founded on the middle course of the Ob.

Until the early 20th century, a particularly important western river-port was Tyumen, located on the Tura, a tributary of the Tobol. Reached by an extension of the Yekaterinburg–Perm railway in 1885, and thus obtaining a rail link to the Kama and Volga rivers in the heart of Russia, Tyumen became an important railhead for some years until the railway extended further east. In the eastern reaches of the Ob basin, Tomsk on the Tom functioned as an important terminus.

Tyumen had its first steamboat in 1836, and steamboats have navigated the middle reaches of the Ob since 1845. In 1916, there were 49 steamers on the Ob; 10 on the Yenisei. In the 1870s, the navigability of the river was explored by Christian Dahl, who was instrumental in opening up a direct trade route from central Siberia to Western Europe.

In an attempt to extend the Ob navigable system even further, a system of canals, utilising the Ket, 900 km (560 mi) long in all, was built in the late 19th-century to connect the Ob with the Yenisei, but soon abandoned as being uncompetitive with the railway.

The Trans-Siberian Railway, once completed, provided for more direct, year-round transport in the east–west direction. But the Ob river-system still remained important for connecting the huge expanses of Tyumen Oblast and Tomsk Oblast with the major cities along the Trans-Siberian route, such as Novosibirsk or Omsk. In the second half of the 20th century, construction of rail links to Labytnangi, Tobolsk, and the oil and gas cities of Surgut, and Nizhnevartovsk provided more railheads, but did not diminish the importance of the waterways for reaching places still not served by the rail.

A dam built near Novosibirsk in 1956 created the then-largest artificial lake in Siberia, called Novosibirsk Reservoir. From the 1960s through 1980s, Soviet engineers and administrators contemplated a gigantic project to divert some of the waters of Ob and Irtysh to Kazakhstan and the Soviet Central Asian republics, replenishing the Aral Sea as well. The project never left the drawing board, abandoned in 1986 for economic and environmental considerations.

== Pollution ==
As of 2019, the anthropogenic loading on the Ob river is substantially increased relative to the mid-1900s.

The Ob river catchment is part of the West Siberian petroleum basin and as such has large oilfields and oil and gas infrastructure in its area, which are a substantial source of pollutants to the Ob. In the lower reaches, the maximum permissible concentrations of petroleum products are exceeded by 9–10 times. The oxygen content in the water is 4 times lower than normal.

A study of the Middle Ob from 2003-2008 and 2014-2018 identified the main pollutants as phenols, hydrocarbons, iron, manganese, copper, and phosphate from natural and anthropogenic sources.

== Tributaries ==
The Irtysh is the chief tributary of the Ob. The larger tributaries along its course are:

from the left	from the right
Katun; Peschanaya; Anuy; Charysh; Aley; Barnaulka; Kasmala; Shegarka; Chaya; Parabel; Vasyugan; Bolshoy Yugan; Bolshoy Salym; Irtysh; Severnaya Sosva; Shchuchya; Synya; Sob	Bolshaya Rechka; Biya; Chumysh; Berd; Inya; Tom; Chulym; Ket; Tym; Kievsky Yogan; Vakh; Vatinsky Yogan; Tromyogan; Pim; Lyamin; Kazym; Poluy

Smaller tributaries include Pemboy (right), 207 km off the mouth of the Ob.

In addition, the Nadym and the Pur River flow into the Gulf of Ob and the Taz into the Taz Estuary, a side arm of the Gulf of Ob.

== Cities ==
Cities along the river include:

- Barnaul
- Kamen-na-Obi
- Novosibirsk (Russia's third largest city and Siberia's largest by population)
- Kolpashevo
- Langepas
- Megion
- Nizhnevartovsk
- Surgut
- Khanty-Mansiysk
- Beryozovo
- Labytnangi
- Salekhard

== Bridges ==
From a confluence to a source:

- Surgut Bridge
- Railway bridge in Surgut
- Shegarsky bridge
- The bridge of "northern bypass" of Novosibirsk
- Dimitrov bridge in Novosibirsk
- First railway bridge across the Ob (Trans-Siberian Railway)
- Communal (October) bridge in Novosibirsk
- Metro bridge in Novosibirsk – longest Metro Bridge in the world
- Bugrinsky Bridge
- Komsomol railway bridge in Novosibirsk
- The bridge above the lock of Novosibirskaya HPP
- Railway bridge in Kamen-na-Obi
- Communal bridge (railway, automobile) in Barnaul
- New bridge in Barnaul

== See also ==
- List of rivers of Russia
- Siman Island
