= Arkhangelskoye, Arkhangelsky District, Republic of Bashkortostan =

Arkhangelskoye Архангельское
- Selo

Other transcription(s)
  - Bashkir: Архангел
- Interactive map of Arkhangelskoye
- Location of Arkhangelskoye Arkhangelskoye (Bashkortostan)
- Coordinates: 54°24′25″N 56°46′33″E
- Country: Russia
- Federal subject: Bashkortostan
- Administrative district: Arkhangelsky District
- SelsovietSelsoviet: Arkhangelsky Selsoviet
- Founded: 1 March 1753

Population (2010 Census)
  - Total: 5,819
  - Estimate (2010): 5,819 (0%)

Administrative status
  - Capital of: Arkhangelsky District, Arkhangelsky Selsoviet

Municipal status
  - Municipal district: Arkhangelsky Municipal District
  - Rural settlement: Arkhangelsky Selsoviet Rural Settlement
  - Capital of: Arkhangelsky Municipal District, Arkhangelsky Selsoviet Rural Settlement
- Time zone: UTC+5 (MSK+2)
- Postal code: 453030
- OKTMO ID: 80603410101

Arkhangelskoye (Russian: Арха́нгельское, Bashkir: Архангел, Arxangel) is a rural locality (a selo) and the administrative center of Arkhangelsky District of the Republic of Bashkortostan, Russia. Population: 5,819 (2010 census); 5,641 (2002 census); 5,387 (1989 Soviet census).
