= Arkhangelsky District =

Arkhangelsky District Архангельский район (Russian)
- District

Other transcription(s)
  - Bashkir: Архангел районы
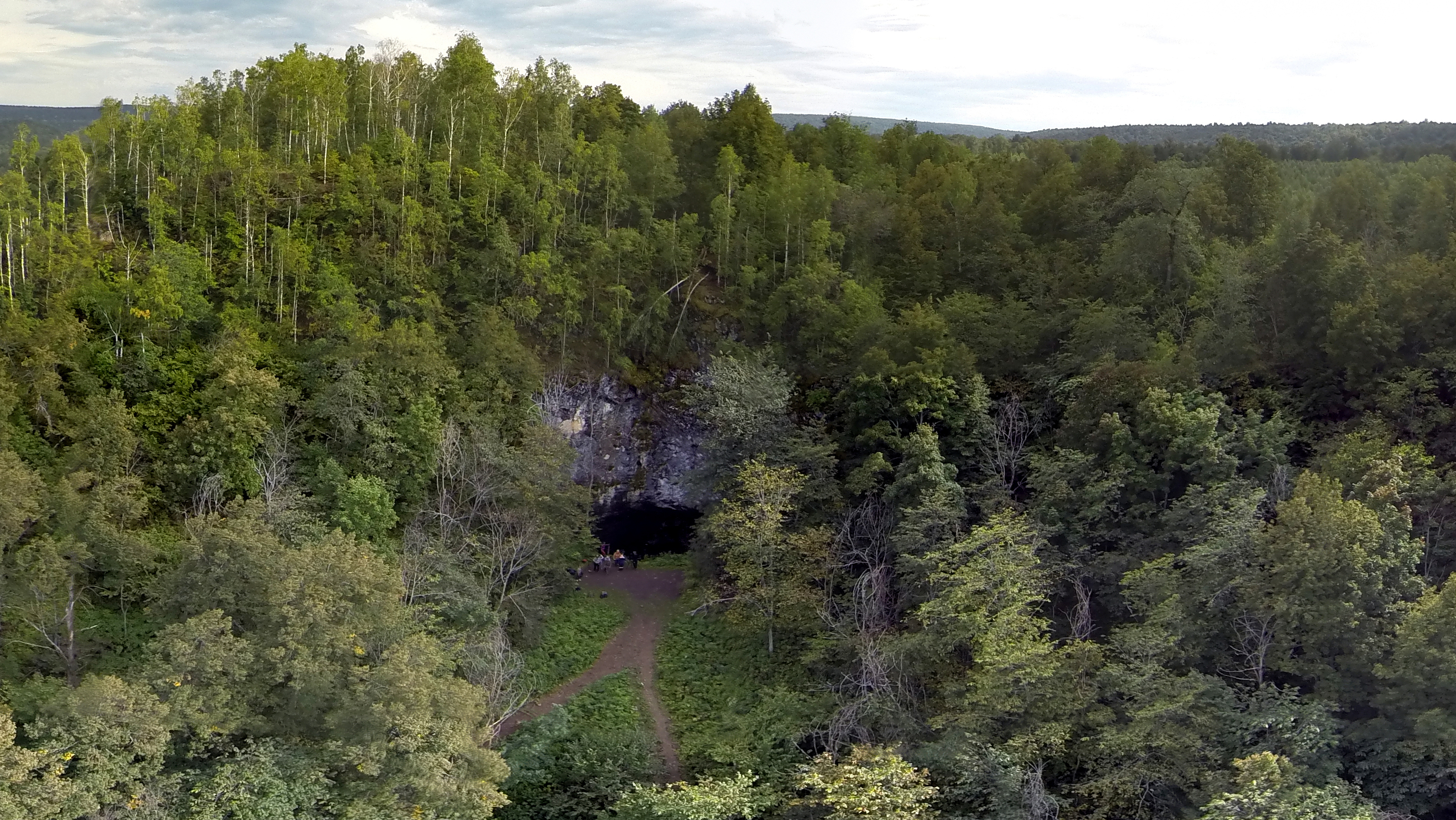
- Askynskaya ice cave, Arkhangelsky District

- Flag Coat of arms
- Location of Arkhangelsky District in the Republic of Bashkortostan
- Coordinates: 54°32′N 56°58′E
- Country: Russia
- Federal subject: Republic of Bashkortostan
- Established: August 20, 1930
- Administrative center: Arkhangelskoye

Area
  - Total: 2,422 km^{2} (935 sq mi)

Population (2010 Census)
  - Total: 18,514
  - Density: 7.644/km^{2} (19.80/sq mi)
  - Urban: 0%
  - Rural: 100%

Administrative structure
  - Administrative divisions: 12 Selsoviets
  - Inhabited localities: 71 rural localities

Municipal structure
  - Municipally incorporated as: Arkhangelsky Municipal District
  - Municipal divisions: 0 urban settlements, 12 rural settlements
- Time zone: UTC+5 (MSK+2)
- OKTMO ID: 80603000
- Website: http://www.arh-raion.ru

Population of Arkhangelsky District
- 2010 Census: 18,514
- 2002 Census: 20,165
- 1989 Census: 20,720
- 1979 Census: 24,825

Arkhangelsky District (Russian: Арха́нгельский райо́н; Bashkir: Архангел районы, Arxangel rayonı) is an administrative and municipal district (raion), one of the fifty-four in the Republic of Bashkortostan, Russia. It is located in the east of the republic. The area of the district is 2,422 square kilometers (935 sq mi). Its administrative center is the rural locality (a selo) of Arkhangelskoye. As of the 2010 Census, the total population of the district was 18,514, with the population of Arkhangelskoye accounting for 31.4% of that number.

== History ==
The district was established on August 20, 1930.

== Administrative and municipal status ==
Within the framework of administrative divisions, Arkhangelsky District is one of the fifty-four in the Republic of Bashkortostan. The district is divided into twelve selsoviets, comprising seventy-one rural localities. As a municipal division, the district is incorporated as Arkhangelsky Municipal District. Its twelve selsoviets are incorporated as twelve rural settlements within the municipal district. The selo of Arkhangelskoye serves as the administrative center of both the administrative and municipal district.

== Economy ==
The district has developed livestock farming with dairy-meat production and bee keeping. Wheat, sugar beet, rye, and oats are grown. A significant development has been the forestry industry.

== Nature ==
Arkhangelsky State Reserve was established in the district for the protection of waterfowl.
