= 2025 Komi head election =

- 12–14 September 2025
- Turnout: 37.68% ▲7.59 pp
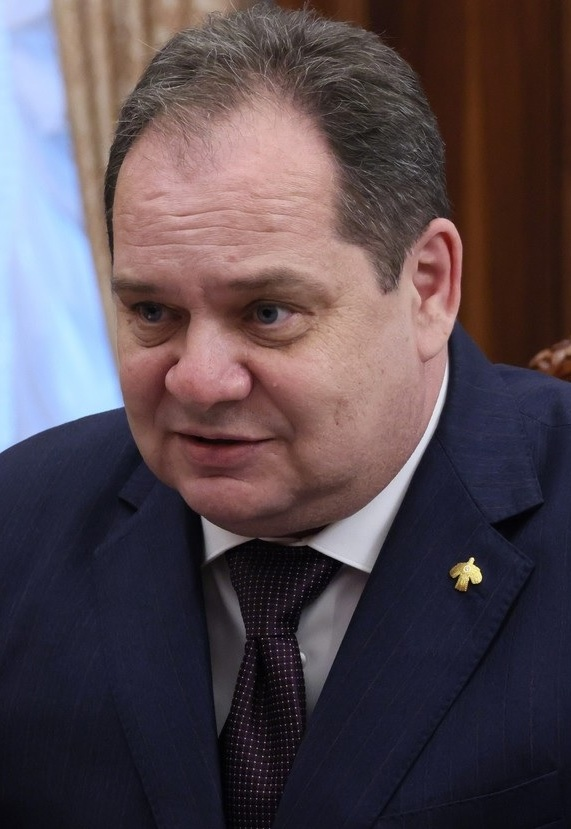

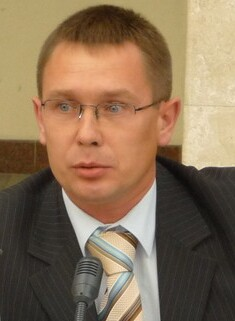
		SR–ZP
Candidate	Rostislav Goldstein	Tatyana Saladina
Party	United Russia	SR–ZP
Popular vote	163,075	25,624
Percentage	70.04%	11.01%
	CPCR
Candidate	Aleksandr Kasyanenko	Sergey Karginov
Party	Communists of Russia	LDPR
Popular vote	20,012	12,478
Percentage	8.60%	5.36%
Head before election
Rostislav Goldstein (acting)
United Russia
Head-elect
Rostislav Goldstein
United Russia

The 2025 Komi Republic head election took place on 12–14 September 2025, on common election day, coinciding with 2025 Komi legislative election. Acting head of the Komi Republic Rostislav Goldstein was elected for a full term in office.

== Background ==
Deputy Minister of Health of Russia Vladimir Uyba was appointed acting head of the Komi Republic in April 2020, replacing first-term incumbent Sergey Gaplikov. Gaplikov left after poor handling of the COVID-19 pandemic and 2018–2020 Shies ecological protests. Uyba ran for a full term as an independent with United Russia support and won the election with 73.18% of the vote. However, Uyba's main opponent, State Council of the Komi Republic member and local Communist Party leader Oleg Mikhaylov, was barred from running after failing to pass the municipal filter.

Uyba's term as head of the Komi Republic was defined by numerous controversies and conflicts elicited by Uyba's behaviour. In April 2021 after head of the Komi Republic's annual address to the State Council of the Komi Republic Uyba obscenely responded to the criticism from State Council member Oleg Mikhaylov and personally threatened the politician. In May 2021 after an oil spill near Usinsk Uyba sparred with community members, calling himself "their Vladimir Putin" after one local resident suggested complaining to the Russian president. In December 2022 Uyba once again sparred with local residents, naming eco-activists "ecological trash" for their opposition to waste sorting facility construction. Finally, in April 2023 police officer in Syktyvkar asked Uyba to move his motorcade blocking a parking lot, however, the Komi head declined and publicly lambasted the law enforcement official.

Head of the Komi Republic's low public approval also translated to election results. In the 2021 Russian legislative election United Russia received only 29.44% in the Komi Republic – its third worst result nationally (United Russia still finished first ahead of 26.88% won by CPRF), which also led to United Russia regional group, personally led by Vladimir Uyba, failing to win any seat in the State Duma by party lists. Meanwhile, in the Syktyvkar constituency United Russia candidate Olga Savastianova, then-chairwoman of the Duma rules committee, was defeated by Communist Oleg Mikhaylov, receiving 26.8% to Mikhaylov's 32.4%.

Due to Uyba's permanent conflicts with local elites and citizens he was consistently considered one the most likely Russian governors to be replaced. Uyba was also attributed to poor management, lack of communication and positioning skills, as well as, personal conflict with Lukoil – the largest taxpayer in the republic. On November 5, 2024, Vladimir Uyba announced his resignation as head of the Komi Republic. Later that day President Putin approved Uyba's resignation and appointed him First Deputy Head of the Main Military Medical Directorate in the Ministry of Defense. Putin also appointed Governor of Jewish Autonomous Oblast Rostislav Goldstein as acting head of the Komi Republic. Goldstein previously lived in Komi for 17 years, served in the State Council of the Komi Republic and represented the region in the State Duma.

== Candidates ==
In Komi Republic candidates for head of the Komi Republic can be nominated by registered political parties or by self-nomination. Candidate for Head of the Komi Republic should be a Russian citizen and at least 30 years old. Candidates for head of the Komi Republic should not have a foreign citizenship or residence permit. Each candidate in order to be registered is required to collect at least 10% of signatures of members and heads of municipalities. In addition, self-nominated candidates should collect 1% of signatures of Komi residents. Also head candidates present 3 candidacies to the Federation Council and election winner later appoints one of the presented candidates.

=== Declared ===
Candidate name, political party		Occupation	Status	Ref.
Rostislav Goldstein; United Russia	Rostislav Goldstein	Acting Head of the Komi Republic (2024–present); Former Governor of Jewish Autonomous Oblast (2019–2024)	Registered	
Sergey Karginov; Liberal Democratic Party	Sergey Karginov	Member of State Duma (2011–present); 2014 Vologda Oblast gubernatorial candidate	Registered	
Aleksandr Kasyanenko; Communists of Russia		Physical education teacher	Registered	
Tatyana Saladina; SR–ZP		Member of State Council of the Komi Republic (2011–present)	Registered	
Stepan Solovyov; Green Alternative		Deputy chairman of Green Alternative party 2024 Chelyabinsk Oblast gubernatorial candidate 2024 Samara Oblast gubernatorial candidate	Registered	
Natalya Goiman; Independent		Retired kindergarten principal	Failed to qualify	
Vladimir Gorbunov; Rodina		Businessman	Failed to qualify	
Svetlana Ignatova; Independent		Pensioner	Failed to qualify	
Oleg Mikhaylov; Communist Party	Oleg Mikhaylov	Member of State Duma (2021–present); 2020 head candidate	Failed to qualify	
Ilya Popov; Independent		Individual entrepreneur	Failed to qualify	
Artyom Sinyavsky; RPSS		IT engineer	Failed to qualify	
Svetlana Kuznetsova; Independent		Teaching methodologist	Did not file	

=== Candidates for Federation Council ===
Incumbent Senator Olga Yepifanova (SR–ZP) was not renominated.

Head candidate, political party	Candidates for Federation Council	Status
Rostislav Goldstein; United Russia	* Vladimir Dzhabarov, Senator from Jewish Autonomous Oblast (2009–present) * Ivan Glukh, anesthesiologist-reanimatologist * Yelena Lifenko, community activist	Registered
Sergey Karginov; Liberal Democratic Party	* Maksim Krayn, Member of Sosnogorsk Council (2022–present), Russian Army company commander * Tatyana Krivoshchyokova, Member of Syktyvkar Council (2020–present), radio executive * Vitaly Lodygin, Member of Inta Council (2020–present), power plant shift supervisor	Registered
Aleksandr Kasyanenko; Communists of Russia	* Yaroslav Berezhnykh, coal mine technician * Artyom Fedorov, electromechanic * Svetlana Vityazeva, social services specialist	Registered
Tatyana Saladina; SR–ZP	* Dmitry Belyayev, Member of Syktyvkar Council (2020–present), orphanage director * Rail Khasanov, military veteran * Olga Medvedeva, youth activist	Registered
Stepan Solovyov; Green Alternative	* Ivan Makeychikov, former auto mechanic * Inna Popova, shopkeeper * Ivan Stratonov, coal mine site supervisor	Registered
Natalya Goiman; Independent	* Rezeda Gallyamova, lyceum deputy principal * Galina Morozova, HR specialist * Dmitry Sizev, Member of Civic Chamber of the Komi Republic	Failed to qualify
Vladimir Gorbunov; Rodina	* Yelena Ivanova, Member of State Council of the Komi Republic (2020–present) * Maksim Karaulnov, unemployed * Yevgeny Poletskov, construction businessman	Failed to qualify
Svetlana Ignatova; Independent	* Andrey Ignatov, self-employed, candidate's husband	Failed to qualify
Oleg Mikhaylov; Communist Party	* Yekaterina Dyachkova, Member of State Council of the Komi Republic (2018–present), biology and physics teacher * Aleksey Gromov, Member of Pechora Council (2020–present), aide to Oleg Mikhaylov * Andrey Nikulin, lawyer	Failed to qualify
Ilya Popov; Independent	* Dmitry Alekseyev, youth centre director * Aleksandr Pechinin, Deputy Head of Ezhvinsky District, former judge * Sergey Voronin, Head of Ezhvinsky District (2020–present)	Failed to qualify
Artyom Sinyavsky; RPSS	* Mikhail Savin, chief power engineer * Nikolay Yurkovsky, Member of Vylgort Council (2016–present), farmer	Failed to qualify

== Finances ==
All sums are in rubles.

Financial Report	Source	Goiman	Goldstein	Gorbunov	Ignatova	Karginov	Kasyanenko	Kuznetsova	Mikhaylov	Popov	Saladina	Sinyavsky	Solovyov
First		110,200	6,430,000	163,300	0	702,200	3,193,800	0	552,100	321,700	350,000	224,100	3,321,700
Final		110,200	86,610,000	163,300	19,155	1,102,200	30,693,800	0	682,100	321,700	TBD	1,184,100	23,320,700

== Polls ==
Fieldwork date	Polling firm	Goldstein	Saladina	Kasyanenko	Karginov	Solovyov	Lead
14 September 2025	2025 election	70.0	11.0	8.6	5.4	2.3	59.0
9–22 August 2025	FOM	72.6	10.0	5.1	7.0	2.3	62.6

== Results ==
Summary of the 12–14 September 2025 Komi head election results
Candidate	Party	Votes	%
Rostislav Goldstein (incumbent)	United Russia	163,075	70.04
Tatyana Saladina	A Just Russia – For Truth	25,624	11.01
Aleksandr Kasyanenko	Communists of Russia	20,012	8.60
Sergey Karginov	Liberal Democratic Party	12,478	5.36
Stepan Solovyov	Green Alternative	5,308	2.28
Valid votes		226,497	97.28
Blank ballots		6,322	2.72
Total		232,819	100.00
Turnout		232,819	37.68
Registered voters		617,882	100.00

Head Goldstein appointed Senator from Jewish Autonomous Oblast Vladimir Dzhabarov (United Russia) to the Federation Council, replacing incumbent Senator Olga Yepifanova (SR–ZP).

== See also ==
- 2025 Russian regional elections
