= Syktyvkar constituency =

Russian legislative constituency

Syktyvkar single-member constituency
- Constituency of the Russian State Duma

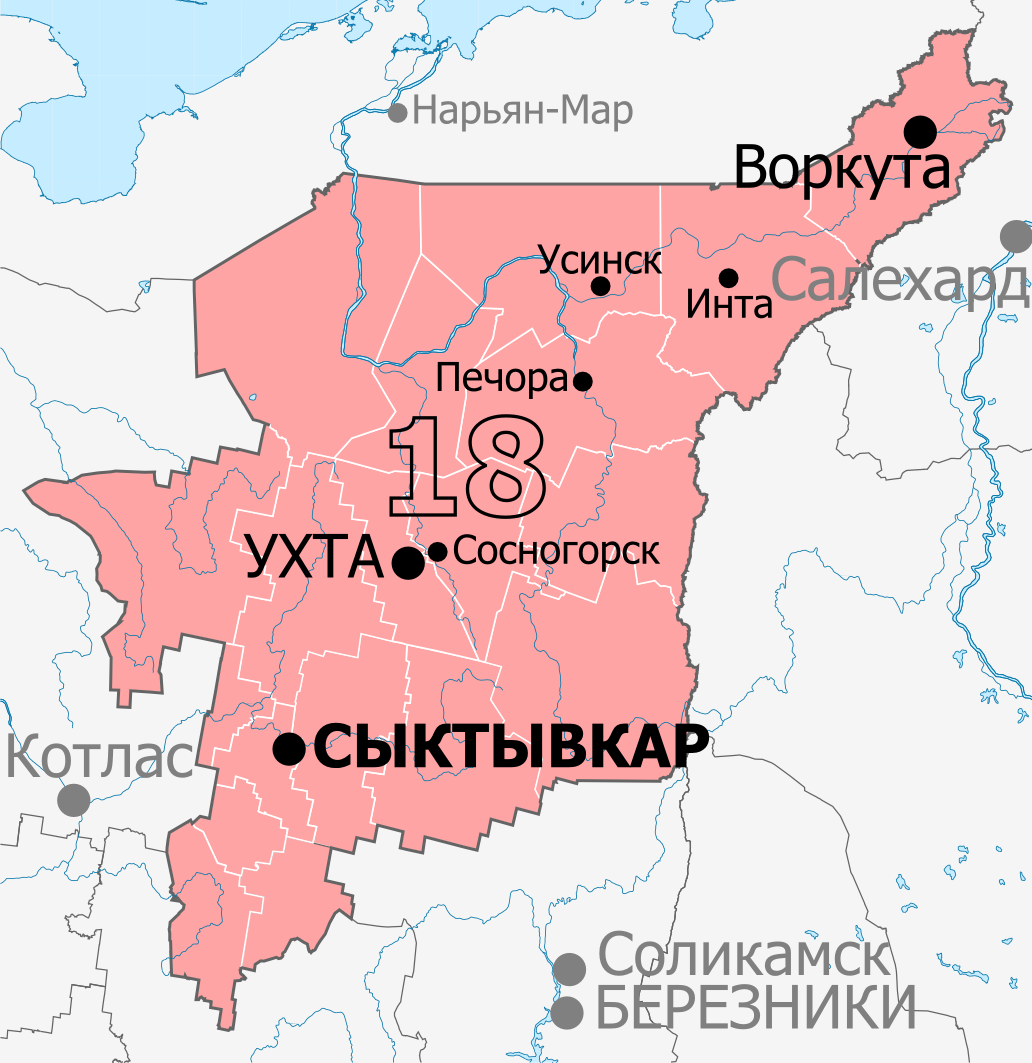
- Deputy: Stanislav Kochev; United Russia
- Federal subject: Komi Republic
- Districts: Inta, Izhemsky, Knyazhpogostsky, Kortkerossky, Koygorodsky, Pechora, Priluzsky, Sosnogorsk, Syktyvdinsky, Syktyvkar, Sysolsky, Troitsko-Pechorsky, Udorsky, Ukhta, Usinsk, Ust-Kulomsky, Ust-Tsilemsky, Ust-Vymsky, Vorkuta, Vuktyl
- Voters: 606,847 (2026)

The Syktyvkar Constituency (No.21 (Note: No.17 in 1995-2003, No.18 in 2016–2026)) is a Russian legislative constituency in the Komi Republic. The constituency encompasses the entire territory of Komi. However, in 1993–1995 Komi had two constituencies but lost one of them due to population decline.

The constituency has been represented since 2026 by United Russia deputy Stanislav Kochev, former Deputy Chairman of the State Council of the Komi Republic and Hero of Russia, who defeated one-term Communist incumbent Oleg Mikhailov.

== Boundaries ==
1993–1995:
Pechora constituency: Inta, Izhemsky District, Pechora, Sosnogorsk, Troitsko-Pechorsky District, Usinsk, Ust-Tsilemsky, Vorkuta, Vuktyl
The constituency covered eastern and northern Komi Republic, including the towns of Inta, Pechora, Sosnogorsk, Usinsk, Vorkuta and Vuktyl.

Syktyvkar constituency: Knyazhpogostsky District, Kortkerossky District, Koygorodsky District, Priluzsky District, Syktyvdinsky District, Syktyvkar, Sysolsky District, Udorsky District, Ukhta, Ust-Kulomsky District, Ust-Vymsky District
The constituency covered western and southern Komi Republic, including the republican capital of Syktyvkar and the town of Ukhta.

1995–2007, 2016–present: Inta, Izhemsky District, Knyazhpogostsky District, Kortkerossky District, Koygorodsky District, Pechora, Priluzsky District, Sosnogorsk, Syktyvdinsky District, Syktyvkar, Sysolsky District, Troitsko-Pechorsky District, Udorsky District, Ukhta, Usinsk, Ust-Kulomsky District, Ust-Tsilemsky District, Ust-Vymsky District, Vorkuta, Vuktyl
The constituency has been covering the entirety of the Komi Republic since 1995 redistricting, as Komi lost a second constituency due to population loss.

== Members elected ==
Election	Member	Party
1993	Valery Maksimov (Note: Pechora constituency)	Independent
1993	Nikolay Gen (Note: Syktyvkar constituency)	Independent
1995	Rita Chistokhodova	Independent
1999	Valery Markov	Independent
2003	Yury Spiridonov	Independent
2007	Proportional representation - no election by constituency	
2011	Proportional representation - no election by constituency	
2016	Ivan Medvedev	United Russia
2021	Oleg Mikhailov	Communist Party
2026	Stanislav Kochev	United Russia

== Election results ==
=== 1993 (Pechora constituency) ===
==== Declared candidates ====
- Valery Maksimov (Independent), former People's Deputy of the Soviet Union (1989–1991)
- Valery Nesterov (Independent), Mi-8 helicopter captain at Pechora Aviation Enterprise
- Oleg Vostrukhov (RDDR), former People's Deputy of the Soviet Union (1989–1991)

==== Results ====
Summary of the 12 December 1993 Russian legislative election in the Pechora constituency
Candidate	Party	Votes	%
Valery Maksimov	Independent	54,701	32.01%
Valery Nesterov	Independent	–	31.22%
Oleg Vostrukhov	Russian Democratic Reform Movement	–	–
Total		170,865	100%

=== 1993 (Syktyvkar constituency) ===
==== Declared candidates ====
- Nikolay Gen (Independent), former People's Deputy of Russia (1990–1993), prosecutor (previously ran as BR–NI candidate)
- Vera Kuznetsova (Choice of Russia), nonprofit director
- Aleksandr Odintsov (DiM), retired Soviet Army colonel general
- Anatoly Pistsov (Civic Union), Chairman of the Syktyvkar City Council of People's Deputies (1992–present), colonel of justice
- Yekaterina Popova (Women of Russia), Member of Supreme Council of the Komi Republic (1990–present), chief doctor of the republican hospital
- Vladimir Trifonov (PRES), Head of the State Committee on Antimonopoly Policy Regional Office
- Valery Zlobin (LDPR), coordinator of the party regional office

==== Results ====
Summary of the 12 December 1993 Russian legislative election in the Syktyvkar constituency
Candidate	Party	Votes	%
Nikolay Gen	Independent	45,124	21.22%
Yekaterina Popova	Women of Russia	–	20.79%
Vera Kuznetsova	Choice of Russia	–	10.3%
Aleksandr Odintsov	Dignity and Charity	–	–
Anatoly Pistsov	Civic Union	–	–
Vladimir Trifonov	Party of Russian Unity and Accord	–	–
Valery Zlobin	Liberal Democratic Party	–	–
Total		212,653	100%
Registered voters/turnout		424,231	50.13%

=== 1995 ===
==== Declared candidates ====
- Yevgeny Babusenko (Independent), coal mine director
- Sergey Borisov (Independent), middle school teacher
- Rita Chistokhodova (Independent), Member of State Council of the Komi Republic (1995–present), prosecutor
- Mikhail Gluzman (Forward, Russia!), former Member of Supreme Council of the Komi Republic (1990–1995), banker
- Vyacheslav Mikulinsky (PES), businessman
- Gennady Rassokhin (NDR), former People's Deputy of Russia (1990–1993), rector of Ukhta State Technical Institute (1980–present)
- Vera Skotobogatova (BIR), secretary of the Russian Union of Youth (1994–present)
- Andrey Titarenko (PLP), physician

==== Declined ====
- Nikolay Gen (Independent), incumbent Member of State Duma (1994–present) (Note: redistricted from the Syktyvkar constituency)
- Valery Maksimov (BIR), incumbent Member of State Duma (1994–present) (Note: redistricted from the Pechora constituency)

==== Results ====
Summary of the 17 December 1995 Russian legislative election in the Syktyvkar constituency
Candidate	Party	Votes	%
Rita Chistokhodova	Independent	109,408	24.57%
Gennady Rassokhin	Our Home – Russia	97,487	21.89%
Mikhail Gluzman	Forward, Russia!	53,846	12.09%
Vera Skorobogatova	Ivan Rybkin Bloc	40,718	9.14%
Sergey Borisov	Independent	38,595	8.67%
Yevgeny Babusenko	Independent	37,102	8.33%
Andrey Titarenko	Beer Lovers Party	8,411	1.89%
Vitaly Mikulinsky	Party of Economic Freedom	4,151	0.93%
against all		47,511	10.67%
Total		445,307	100%

=== 1999 ===
==== Declared candidates ====
- Aleksandr Amonariyev (CPRF), Chairman of the Pechora City Council, middle school principal
- Valentina Kotelnikova (Women of Russia), rector of Komi Republican Academy of Public Administration (1996–present)
- Vladimir Lushnikov (Independent), former People's Deputy of the Soviet Union (1989–1991)
- Valery Markov (Independent), Deputy Chairman of the State Council of the Komi Republic (1995–present), 1994 head candidate
- Nikolay Moiseyev (Yabloko), Member of State Council of the Komi Republic (1995–present), aide to State Duma member
- Ivan Mokhnachuk (Independent), coal miners' union leader
- Valery Prokhorov (Independent), businessman
- Mikhail Zhilin (Independent), attorney

==== Failed to qualify ====
- Rita Chistokhodova (Independent), incumbent Member of State Duma (1996–present), 1997 head candidate
- Mikhail Kodanyov (Independent), Member of Syktyvkar City Council, 1997 head candidate
- Valery Nesterov (Independent), former Member of State Council of the Komi Republic (1995–1999), 1993 candidate for this seat
- Ivan Ruban (Independent), entrepreneur
- Vera Skorobogatova (OVR), first secretary of the Russian Union of Youth (1997–present), 1995 BIR candidate for this seat
- Lyudmila Zyryanova (Independent), Member of State Council of the Komi Republic (1999–present)

==== Did not file ====
- Oleg Beimler (Independent), German association leader
- Vyacheslav Derevyagin (KTR–zSS), Vorkuta Institute of Management, Business, and Law faculty of law dean
- Sergey Ivanov (Independent)
- Mikhail Martemyanov (RSP), pensioner
- Sergey Mikhalyuk (Independent), attorney
- Yury Napylnov (Nikolayev–Fyodorov Bloc), businessman
- Aleksandr Nekrasov (LDPR), acting coordinator of the party regional office
- Ilyas Safiulin (Independent)

==== Results ====
Summary of the 19 December 1999 Russian legislative election in the Syktyvkar constituency
Candidate	Party	Votes	%
Valery Markov	Independent	116,243	25.38%
Ivan Mokhnachuk	Independent	57,953	12.66%
Valentina Kotelnikova	Women of Russia	55,859	12.20%
Nikolay Moiseyev	Yabloko	54,191	11.83%
Aleksandr Amonariyev	Communist Party	51,494	11.24%
Vladimir Lushnikov	Independent	28,920	6.32%
Mikhail Zhilin	Independent	15,393	3.36%
Valery Prokhorov	Independent	9,544	2.08%
against all		59,866	13.07%
Total		457,929	100%

=== 2003 ===
Results by district: Yury Spiridonov: 20–30% 30–40% 40–50%; Vikenty Kozlov: 20–30% 30–40% 40–50%; Vasily Avdeyev: 20–30%; Against all: 20–30%

==== Declared candidates ====
- Vasily Avdeyev (Independent), agriculture businessman
- Aleksandra Bushuyeva (SPS), Member of Syktyvkar Council (2003–present), journalist
- Vikenty Kozlov (Independent), telecommunications executive
- Leonid Musinov (CPRF), aide to State Duma member, 2001 head candidate
- Yevgeny Neznanov (LDPR), installation executive
- Pavel Sobotyuk (Creation), security executive
- Yury Spiridonov (Independent), former Head of the Komi Republic (1994–2001) (previously ran as SDPR candidate)

==== Withdrawn candidates ====
- Valery Markov (NPRF), incumbent Member of State Duma (2000–present)

==== Did not file ====
- Yevgeny Cheglakov (NPPR), utilities executive
- Sergey Drozdetsky (Independent), college extern
- Galina Kostenkova (Independent), unemployed
- Ivan Mokhnachuk (Independent), coal miners' union leader, 1999 candidate for this seat
- Aleksandr Shchigolev (KPR), entrepreneur
- Nikolay Silantyev (RKRP-RPK), coal miner
- Vladislav Ulyashev (Independent), businessman

==== Results ====
Summary of the 7 December 2003 Russian legislative election in the Syktyvkar constituency
Candidate	Party	Votes	%
Yury Spiridonov	Independent	108,832	26.86%
Vikenty Kozlov	Independent	108,421	26.76%
Leonid Musinov	Communist Party	30,419	7.51%
Aleksandra Bushuyeva	Union of Right Forces	28,112	6.94%
Vasily Avdeyev	Independent	27,262	6.73%
Yevgeny Neznanov	Liberal Democratic Party	11,570	2.86%
Pavel Sobotyuk	Creation	4,244	1.05%
against all		77,756	19.19%
Total		405,527	100%

=== 2016 ===
==== Declared candidates ====
- Ivan Filipchenko (LDPR), aide to State Duma member, retired militsiya podpolkovnik, 2016 head candidate
- Leonid Litvak (CPCR), former Member of State Council of the Komi Republic (1995–1999), mining businessman
- Ivan Medvedev (United Russia), Member of State Council of the Komi Republic (2011–present), former FGC UES executive
- Oleg Mikhailov (CPRF), Member of State Council of the Komi Republic (2015–present)
- Tatyana Saladina (A Just Russia), Member of State Council of the Komi Republic (2011–present)

==== Did not file ====
- Lyubov Vorobey (Rodina), former Member of State Council of the Komi Republic (1995–2003)

==== Declined ====
- Vladimir Kosov (United Russia), Deputy Chairman of the State Council of the Komi Republic (2015–present), Member of the State Council (2007–present) (lost the primary)
- Tamara Kuzminykh (United Russia), Member of State Duma (2011–present)
- Vladimir Ponevezhsky (United Russia), Member of State Duma (2011–present) (lost the primary)
- Olga Savastianova (United Russia), former Commissioner for Human Rights in the Komi Republic (2012–2013), former Member of State Council of the Komi Republic (2003–2011) (won the primary, ran on the party list)
- Valentina Zhideleva (United Russia), Deputy Chairwoman of the State Council of the Komi Republic (2015–present) (lost the primary)

==== Results ====
Summary of the 18 September 2016 Russian legislative election in the Syktyvkar constituency
Candidate	Party	Votes	%
Ivan Medvedev	United Russia	103,296	36.91%
Tatyana Saladina	A Just Russia	49,496	17.69%
Ivan Filipchenko	Liberal Democratic Party	43,914	15.69%
Oleg Mikhailov	Communist Party	36,463	13.03%
Leonid Litvak	Communists of Russia	26,820	9.58%
Total		279,834	100%

=== 2021 ===
Results by district: Oleg Mikhailov: 20–30% 30–40% 40–50%; Olga Savastyanova: 20–30% 30–40%; Ivan Ruban: 20–30%

==== Declared candidates ====
- Viktor Betekhtin (ZA!), Member of State Council of the Komi Republic (2020–present), 2020 head candidate
- Viktor Filipchuk (New People), businessman
- Oleg Mikhailov (CPRF), Member of State Council of the Komi Republic (2015–present), 2016 candidate for this seat, 2020 head candidate
- Andrey Nikitin (LDPR), former Member of Usinsk Council (2018–2020), individual entrepreneur, 2020 head candidate
- Ivan Ruban (CPCR), Member of Sosnogorsk Council (2020–present), perennial candidate, 1999 candidate for this seat, 2001 and 2016 head candidate
- Tatyana Saladina (SR–ZP), Member of State Council of the Komi Republic (2011–present), 2016 candidate for this seat
- Olga Savastianova (United Russia), Member of State Duma (2016–present), Chairwoman of the Duma Committee on Control and Rules (2016–present)

==== Declined ====
- Ruslan Magomedov (United Russia), Member of State Council of the Komi Republic (2020–present), businessman (lost the primary, ran on the party list)
- Ivan Medvedev (United Russia), incumbent Member of State Duma (2016–present) (lost the primary)

==== Results ====
Summary of the 17-19 September 2021 Russian legislative election in the Syktyvkar constituency
Candidate	Party	Votes	%
Oleg Mikhailov	Communist Party	81,407	32.36%
Olga Savastyanova	United Russia	67,531	26.84%
Tatyana Saladina	A Just Russia — For Truth	23,257	9.24%
Andrey Nikitin	Liberal Democratic Party	21,186	8.42%
Viktor Filipchuk	New People	19,060	7.58%
Ivan Ruban	Communists of Russia	16,926	6.73%
Viktor Betekhtin	Green Alternative	9,105	3.62%
Total		251,579	100%

=== 2026 ===
==== Declared candidate ====
- Olga Chuzhmareva (RPPSS), former Deputy Mayor of Usinsk
- Aleksandr Kasyanenko (CPCR), gym teacher, 2025 head candidate
- Stanislav Kochev (United Russia), Deputy Chairman of the State Council of the Komi Republic (2025–present), Hero of Russia (2023)
- Tatyana Krivoshchyokova (LDPR), former Member of Syktyvkar Council (2020–2025), radio executive
- Semyon Kuleshov (The Greens), event host
- Oleg Mikhailov (CPRF), incumbent Member of State Duma (2021–present), 2020 and 2025 head candidate
- Aleksey Potyomkin (New People), Member of State Council of the Komi Republic (2025–present)
- Tatyana Saladina (A Just Russia), Member of State Council of the Komi Republic (2011–present), 2016 and 2021 candidate for this seat, 2025 head candidate

==== Failed to qualify ====
- Svetlana Ignatova (Independent), pensioner, 2025 head candidate

==== Did not file ====
- Tatyana Kuznetsova (Independent), client manager
- Viktor Torlopov (Independent), pensioner

==== Declined ====
- Andrey Gurulyov (United Russia), Member of State Duma (2021–present) (ran in the Zabaykalye constituency)
- Roman Polshvedkin (United Russia), Minister of Natural Resources and Ecology of the Komi Republic (2014–2021, 2024–present) (lost the primary)

==== Results ====
Summary of the 18-20 September 2026 Russian legislative election in the Syktyvkar constituency
Candidate	Party	Votes	%
Stanislav Kochev	United Russia	129,548	42.15%
Oleg Mikhailov (incumbent)	Communist Party	72,253	23.51%
Tatyana Krivoshchyokova	Liberal Democratic Party	24,109	7.84%
Aleksey Potyomkin	New People	20,339	6.62%
Tatyana Saladina	A Just Russia	16,794	5.46%
Aleksandr Kasyanenko	Communists of Russia	16,239	5.28%
Olga Chuzhmareva	Party of Pensioners	12,414	4.04%
Semyon Kuleshov	The Greens	8,334	2.71%
Total		307,325	100%
