= 2025 Komi legislative election =

Regional legislative election in Russia

- 12–14 September 2025

All 30 seats in the State Council 16 seats needed for a majority
- Turnout: 37.56% ▲7.42 pp
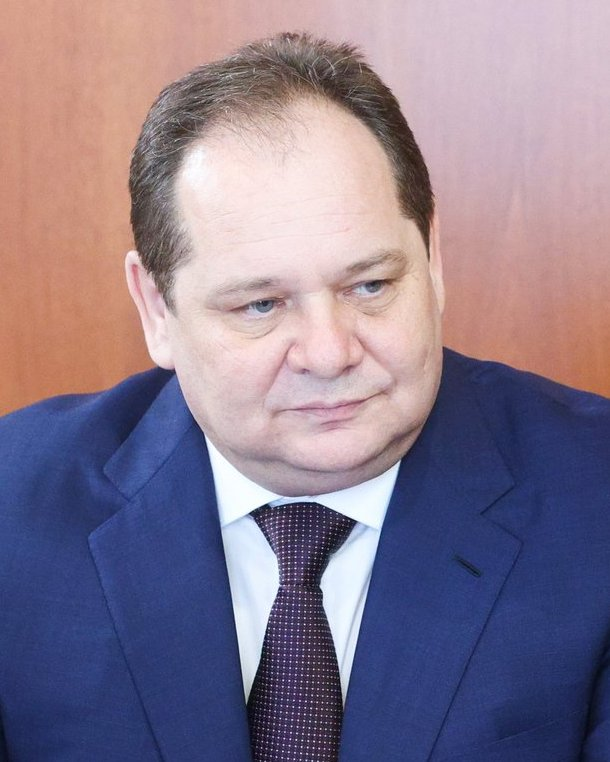

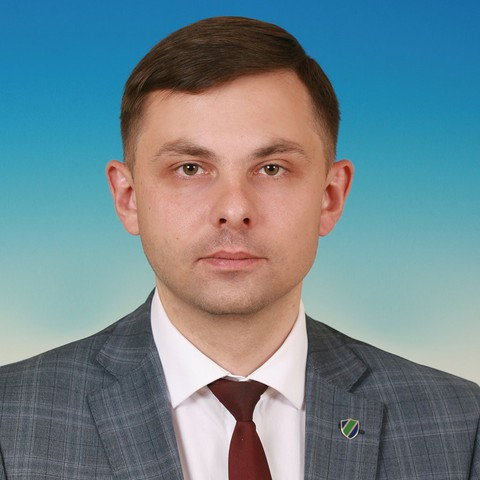
	Majority party	Minority party	Third party
			LDPR
Candidate	Rostislav Goldstein	Oleg Mikhaylov	Maksim Krayn
Party	United Russia	CPRF	LDPR
Last election	28.61%, 20 seats	14.81%, 4 seats	14.45%, 3 seats
Seats won	25	2	1
Seat change	▲5	▼2	▼2
Popular vote	103,259	34,500	32,746
Percentage	44.50%	14.87%	14.11%
Swing	▲15.89 pp	▲0.06 pp	▼0.34 pp
	Fourth party	Fifth party	Sixth party
	SR–ZP	NL	ZA!
Candidate	Tatyana Saladina	Aleksey Potemkin	Stepan Solovyov
Party	SR-ZP	New People	Green Alternative
Last election	8.56%, 1 seat	Did not participate	10.01%, 1 seat
Seats won	1	1	0
Seat change	Steady	Did not participate	▼1
Popular vote	16,401	13,829	8,956
Percentage	7.07%	5.96%	3.86%
Swing	▼1.49 pp	Did not participate	▼6.15 pp
Chairman before election
Sergey Usachyov
United Russia
Elected Chairman
Aleksandr Makarenko
United Russia

The 2025 State Council of the Komi Republic election took place on 12–14 September 2025, on common election day, coinciding with 2025 Komi head election. All 30 seats in the State Council were up for re-election.

United Russia increased its majority in the State Council, winning 44.50% of the vote and all 15 single-mandate constituencies. Communist Party of the Russian Federation and Liberal Democratic Party of Russia lost two deputies each. Green Alternative and Rodina failed to cross the threshold and lost their factions, while New People entered the State Council for the first time.

== Electoral system ==
Under current election laws, the State Council is elected for a term of five years, with parallel voting. 15 seats are elected by party-list proportional representation with a 5% electoral threshold, with the other half elected in 15 single-member constituencies by first-past-the-post voting. Seats in the proportional part are allocated using the Imperiali quota, modified to ensure that every party list, which passes the threshold, receives at least one mandate.

== Candidates ==
=== Party lists ===
To register regional lists of candidates, parties need to collect 0.5% of signatures of all registered voters in the Komi Republic.

The following parties were relieved from the necessity to collect signatures:

- United Russia
- Communist Party of the Russian Federation
- Liberal Democratic Party of Russia
- A Just Russia — Patriots — For Truth
- New People
- Green Alternative
- Rodina
- Russian Party of Freedom and Justice
- Communists of Russia

№	Party	Republic-wide list	Candidates	Territorial groups	Status
1	Russian Party of Freedom and Justice	Rihanna Vezhova • Stepan Panov • Artyom Skvortsov	32	9	Registered
2	Liberal Democratic Party	Maksim Krayn • Mikhail Bragin • Galina Nagayeva	56	15	Registered
3	Communist Party	Oleg Mikhaylov	52	14	Registered
4	A Just Russia – For Truth	Tatyana Saladina • Valeria Prokopyeva	57	15	Registered
5	Communists of Russia	Aleksandr Kasyanenko • Yaroslav Berezhnykh • Darya Neff	31	9	Registered
6	New People	Aleksey Potemkin • Pavel Patsagan • Maksim Doroshenko	52	10	Registered
7	Green Alternative	Stepan Solovyov • Viktor Betekhtin • Aleksey Pushkin	42	10	Registered
8	Rodina	Maksim Karaulnov • ~~Ruslan Galeyev~~ • Tatyana Timkina	41	11	Registered
9	United Russia	Rostislav Goldstein • Stanislav Kochev • Anastasia Mikhaylova	73	15	Registered

New People will take part in Komi legislative election for the first time.

=== Single-mandate constituencies ===
15 single-mandate constituencies were formed in the Komi Republic. To register candidates in single-mandate constituencies need to collect 3% of signatures of registered voters in the constituency.

Number of candidates in single-mandate constituencies
Party	Candidates	
Party	Nominated	Registered
United Russia	15	15
Communist Party	15	14
Liberal Democratic Party	15	13
Green Alternative	12	10
Rodina	15	13
A Just Russia – For Truth	12	10
New People	14	12
Russian Party of Freedom and Justice	10	9
Communists of Russia	12	11
Independent	2	0
Total	122	107

== Polls ==
Fieldwork date	Polling firm	UR	CPRF	LDPR	SR-ZP	NL	ZA	CPCR	RPSS	Rodina
14 September 2025	2025 election	44.5	14.9	14.1	7.1	6.0	3.9	3.6	1.8	1.0
18–22 August 2025	Russian Field	44.1	20.2	16.1	5.7	7.7	2.5	1.1	0.5	0.8
13 September 2020	2020 election	28.6	14.8	14.5	8.6	–	10.0	3.1	4.2	9.8

== Results ==
=== Results by party lists ===
Summary of the 12–14 September 2025 State Council of the Komi Republic election results
Party	Party list					Constituency		Total	
Party	Votes	%	±pp	Seats	+/–	Seats	+/–	Seats	+/–
United Russia	103,259	44.50	▲15.89	10	▲4	15	▲1	25	▲5
Communist Party	34,500	14.87	▲0.06	2	▼1	0	▼1	2	▼2
Liberal Democratic Party	32,746	14.11	▼0.34	1	▼2	0	Steady	1	▼2
A Just Russia — For Truth	16,401	7.07	▼1.49	1	Steady	0	Steady	1	Steady
New People	13,829	5.96	New	1	New	0	New	1	New
Green Alternative	8,956	3.86	▼6.15	0	▼1	0	Steady	0	▼1
Communists of Russia	8,387	3.61	▲0.52	0	Steady	0	Steady	0	Steady
Russian Party of Freedom and Justice	4,060	1.75	▼2.45	0	Steady	0	Steady	0	Steady
Rodina	2,229	0.96	▼8.87	0	▼1	0	Steady	0	▼1
Invalid ballots	7,685	3.31	▼3.13	—	—	—	—	—	—
Total	232,053	100.00	—	15	Steady	15	Steady	30	Steady
Turnout	232,053	37.56	▲7.42	—	—	—	—	—	—
Registered voters	617,887	100.00	—	—	—	—	—	—	—

First Deputy Chairman of the State Council Aleksandr Makarenko (United Russia) was elected new Chairman, while outgoing Speaker Sergey Usachyov (United Russia) became his first deputy. Former Deputy Chairwoman of the Government of Komi Ekaterina Gribkova (United Russia) was appointed to the Federation Council for the seat, left vacant by the resignation of Senator Elena Shumilova (Independent) in June 2025 after losing the primary.

=== Results in single-member constituencies ===
==== District 1 ====
Summary of the 12–14 September 2025 State Council of the Komi Republic election in Northern constituency No.1
Candidate	Party	Votes	%
Dmitry Svistukhin	United Russia	2,938	31.75%
Vladimir Zharuk	Communist Party	2,075	22.42%
Vitaly Zhuravlev	Liberal Democratic Party	1,148	12.40%
Yaroslav Berezhnykh	Communists of Russia	1,114	12.04%
Aleksey Sibiryakov	New People	1,091	11.79%
Ivan Kovalchuk	Rodina	516	5.58%
Total		9,255	100%

==== District 2 ====
Summary of the 12–14 September 2025 State Council of the Komi Republic election in Intinsky constituency No.2
Candidate	Party	Votes	%
Ruslan Magomedov (incumbent)	United Russia	3,951	37.57%
Vitaly Lodygin	Liberal Democratic Party	3,721	35.38%
Maria Merzlyakova	Green Alternative	1,370	13.03%
Denis Rogalev	Rodina	573	5.45%
Total		10,516	100%

==== District 3 ====
Summary of the 12–14 September 2025 State Council of the Komi Republic election in Pechorsky constituency No.3
Candidate	Party	Votes	%
Yelena Kostenetskaya	United Russia	7,425	45.09%
Aleksey Gromov	Communist Party	2,178	13.23%
Viktor Oleynik	Liberal Democratic Party	1,637	9.94%
Viktor Goncharov	A Just Russia – For Truth	1,631	9.90%
Vladimir Pizhenko	New People	1,177	7.15%
Ilya Skorokhodov	Communists of Russia	1,068	6.49%
Aleksandr Krasavtsev	Russian Party of Freedom and Justice	421	2.56%
Vladislav Duvanov	Rodina	202	1.23%
Total		16,468	100%

==== District 4 ====
Summary of the 12–14 September 2025 State Council of the Komi Republic election in Pripolyarny constituency No.4
Candidate	Party	Votes	%
Yury Lodygin	United Russia	7,288	46.76%
Yekaterina Dyachkova	Communist Party	2,651	17.01%
Yelena Amosova	Communists of Russia	1,421	9.12%
Sergey Krivoshchekov	Liberal Democratic Party	1,016	6.52%
Sergey Alginov	A Just Russia – For Truth	992	6.36%
Inna Popova	Green Alternative	928	5.95%
Irina Neklyudova	New People	757	4.86%
Total		15,587	100%

==== District 5 ====
Summary of the 12–14 September 2025 State Council of the Komi Republic election in Irayolsky constituency No.5
Candidate	Party	Votes	%
Andrey Terentyev	United Russia	7,129	40.81%
Nikolay Bratenkov (incumbent)	Communist Party	4,183	23.95%
Maria Anufriyeva	New People	1,408	8.06%
Roman Bogdanov	Communists of Russia	1,222	7.00%
Galina Nagayeva	Liberal Democratic Party	1,136	6.50%
Nadezhda Kaneva	Russian Party of Freedom and Justice	1,034	5.92%
Yekaterina Kamenskikh	Green Alternative	466	2.67%
Nikolay Basov	Rodina	236	1.35%
Total		17,469	100%

==== District 6 ====
Summary of the 12–14 September 2025 State Council of the Komi Republic election in Eastern constituency No.6
Candidate	Party	Votes	%
Aleksey Gabov	United Russia	9,593	48.78%
Tatyana Latkina	Russian Party of Freedom and Justice	1,897	9.65%
Sergey Morokhin	Communist Party	1,709	8.69%
Aleksandr Odintsov	Liberal Democratic Party	1,487	7.56%
Eduard Pimenov	Rodina	1,454	7.39%
Artur Yevgrafov	New People	1,454	7.39%
Vladimir Marchenko	Communists of Russia	1,065	5.42%
Total		19,665	100%

==== District 7 ====
Summary of the 12–14 September 2025 State Council of the Komi Republic election in Western constituency No.7
Candidate	Party	Votes	%
Andrey Klimushev (incumbent)	United Russia	11,233	51.43%
Vladimir Goryashin	Communist Party	3,068	14.05%
Svetlana Alekseyeva	Communists of Russia	2,124	9.72%
Taras Turchin	Liberal Democratic Party	1,855	8.49%
Ivan Noritsin	A Just Russia – For Truth	934	4.28%
Pavel Kish	New People	873	4.00%
Larisa Molostvova	Russian Party of Freedom and Justice	697	3.19%
Tatyana Timkina	Rodina	349	1.60%
Total		21,842	100%

==== District 8 ====
Summary of the 12–14 September 2025 State Council of the Komi Republic election in Borovskoy constituency No.8
Candidate	Party	Votes	%
Vladimir Blokhin (incumbent)	United Russia	8,456	57.09%
Oksana Bagirova	Communist Party	2,418	16.32%
Ilya Velichko	A Just Russia – For Truth	1,990	13.44%
Anastasia Khodyreva	Russian Party of Freedom and Justice	996	6.72%
Dmitry Karaulnov	Rodina	287	1.94%
Total		14,812	100%

==== District 9 ====
Summary of the 12–14 September 2025 State Council of the Komi Republic election in Yaregsky constituency No.9
Candidate	Party	Votes	%
Vyacheslav Zavalnev (incumbent)	United Russia	8,164	55.94%
Svetlana Zvereva	Communist Party	2,830	19.39%
Viktoria Klimantova	Russian Party of Freedom and Justice	1,115	7.64%
Darya Panina	Green Alternative	683	4.68%
Valeria Reva	Communists of Russia	638	4.37%
Andrey Maroko	Rodina	382	2.62%
Total		14,593	100%

==== District 10 ====
Summary of the 12–14 September 2025 State Council of the Komi Republic election in Central constituency No.10
Candidate	Party	Votes	%
Aleksandr Shuchalin	United Russia	4,810	34.21%
Nina Ananina	Communist Party	2,324	16.53%
Eduard Fatykhov	Liberal Democratic Party	1,437	10.22%
Semyon Kuleshov	Green Alternative	1,211	8.61%
Pavel Patsagan	New People	1,182	8.41%
Artur Prokopyev	A Just Russia – For Truth	708	5.04%
Kirill Uvarov	Communists of Russia	669	4.76%
Tatyana Pakhomova	Russian Party of Freedom and Justice	644	4.58%
Yevgeny Poletskov	Rodina	343	2.44%
Total		14,060	100%

==== District 11 ====
Summary of the 12–14 September 2025 State Council of the Komi Republic election in Akademichesky constituency No.11
Candidate	Party	Votes	%
Sergey Usachyov	United Russia	5,228	38.12%
Nikolay Udoratin	Communist Party	2,477	18.06%
Roman Golke-Ebert	New People	1,351	9.85%
Yekaterina Safarova	Liberal Democratic Party	1,260	9.19%
Olga Kirpichyova	Communists of Russia	948	6.91%
Ilona Bakushina	Green Alternative	807	5.88%
Rail Khasanov	A Just Russia – For Truth	614	4.48%
Andrey Sytnik	Rodina	366	2.67%
Total		13,716	100%

==== District 12 ====
Summary of the 12–14 September 2025 State Council of the Komi Republic election in Magistralny constituency No.12
Candidate	Party	Votes	%
Sergey Arteyev (incumbent)	United Russia	6,416	48.63%
Yulia Panyukova	Communist Party	2,167	16.43%
Anita Bauer	Liberal Democratic Party	1,124	8.52%
Valeria Prokopyeva	A Just Russia – For Truth	877	6.65%
Oleg Doroshenko	New People	728	5.52%
Matvey Losev	Green Alternative	621	4.71%
Andrey Trapeznikov	Russian Party of Freedom and Justice	458	3.47%
Aleksandr Kapustin	Rodina	232	1.76%
Total		13,193	100%

==== District 13 ====
Summary of the 12–14 September 2025 State Council of the Komi Republic election in Ezhvinsky constituency No.13
Candidate	Party	Votes	%
Yevgeny Napalkov	United Russia	3,879	29.50%
Aleksey Pushkin	Green Alternative	1,981	15.07%
Aleksandr Neskin	New People	1,493	11.36%
Maria Udoratina	Communist Party	1,493	11.36%
Maksim Yermakov	Liberal Democratic Party	1,309	9.96%
Olga Medvedeva	A Just Russia – For Truth	1,135	8.63%
Kirill Doronin	Communists of Russia	728	5.54%
Aleksandr Kokovkin	Russian Party of Freedom and Justice	248	1.89%
Aleksandr Tyurnin	Rodina	223	1.70%
Total		13,147	100%

==== District 14 ====
Summary of the 12–14 September 2025 State Council of the Komi Republic election in Syktyvdinsky constituency No.14
Candidate	Party	Votes	%
Yury Shirokov	United Russia	3,890	26.45%
Tatyana Saladina	A Just Russia – For Truth	3,486	23.70%
Ksenia Sokolova	Communist Party	1,804	12.27%
Aleksey Potemkin	New People	1,295	8.81%
Yekaterina Potapova	Communists of Russia	1,164	7.92%
Viktor Betekhtin	Green Alternative	1,138	7.74%
Konstantin Savelyev	Liberal Democratic Party	1,132	7.70%
Total		14,706	100%

==== District 15 ====
Summary of the 12–14 September 2025 State Council of the Komi Republic election in Southern constituency No.15
Candidate	Party	Votes	%
Stepan Churakov (incumbent)	United Russia	8,471	48.95%
Stanislav Kuznetsov	Liberal Democratic Party	2,785	16.09%
Kirill Gorodov	Communist Party	1,973	11.40%
Ivan Yelokhin	A Just Russia – For Truth	1,611	9.31%
Lidia Savko	Green Alternative	819	4.73%
Maksim Doroshenko	New People	690	3.99%
Andrey Makeychuk	Rodina	178	1.03%
Total		17,305	100%

=== Members ===
Incumbent deputies are highlighted with bold, elected members who declined to take a seat are marked with ~~strikethrough~~.

Constituency
No.	Member	Party
1	Dmitry Svistukhin	United Russia
2	Ruslan Magomedov	United Russia
3	Yelena Kostenetskaya	United Russia
4	Yury Lodygin	United Russia
5	Andrey Terentyev	United Russia
6	Aleksey Gabov	United Russia
7	Andrey Klimushev	United Russia
8	Vladimir Blokhin	United Russia
9	Vyacheslav Zavalnev	United Russia
10	Aleksandr Shuchalin	United Russia
11	Sergey Usachyov	United Russia
12	Sergey Arteyev	United Russia
13	Yevgeny Napalkov	United Russia
14	Yury Shirokov	United Russia
15	Stepan Churakov	United Russia

Party lists
Member	Party
~~Rostislav Goldstein~~	United Russia
Stanislav Kochev	United Russia
Anastasia Mikhaylova	United Russia
Irina Arteyeva	United Russia
Aleksandr Makarenko	United Russia
~~Tatyana Anisimova~~	United Russia
Valentin Semyonov	United Russia
~~Roman Polshvedkin~~	United Russia
Stepan Ulnyrov	United Russia
Tatyana Ustinova	United Russia
Ruslan Aginey	United Russia
Yekaterina Gribkova	United Russia
Vladimir Kosov	United Russia
~~Oleg Mikhaylov~~	Communist Party
Vladimir Zharuk	Communist Party
Nikolay Udoratin	Communist Party
Maksim Krayn	Liberal Democratic Party
Tatyana Saladina	A Just Russia – For Truth
Aleksey Potemkin	New People

== See also ==
- 2025 Russian regional elections
