= Victor Vorobyov =

Russian lawyer and politician

- Виктор Воробьёв
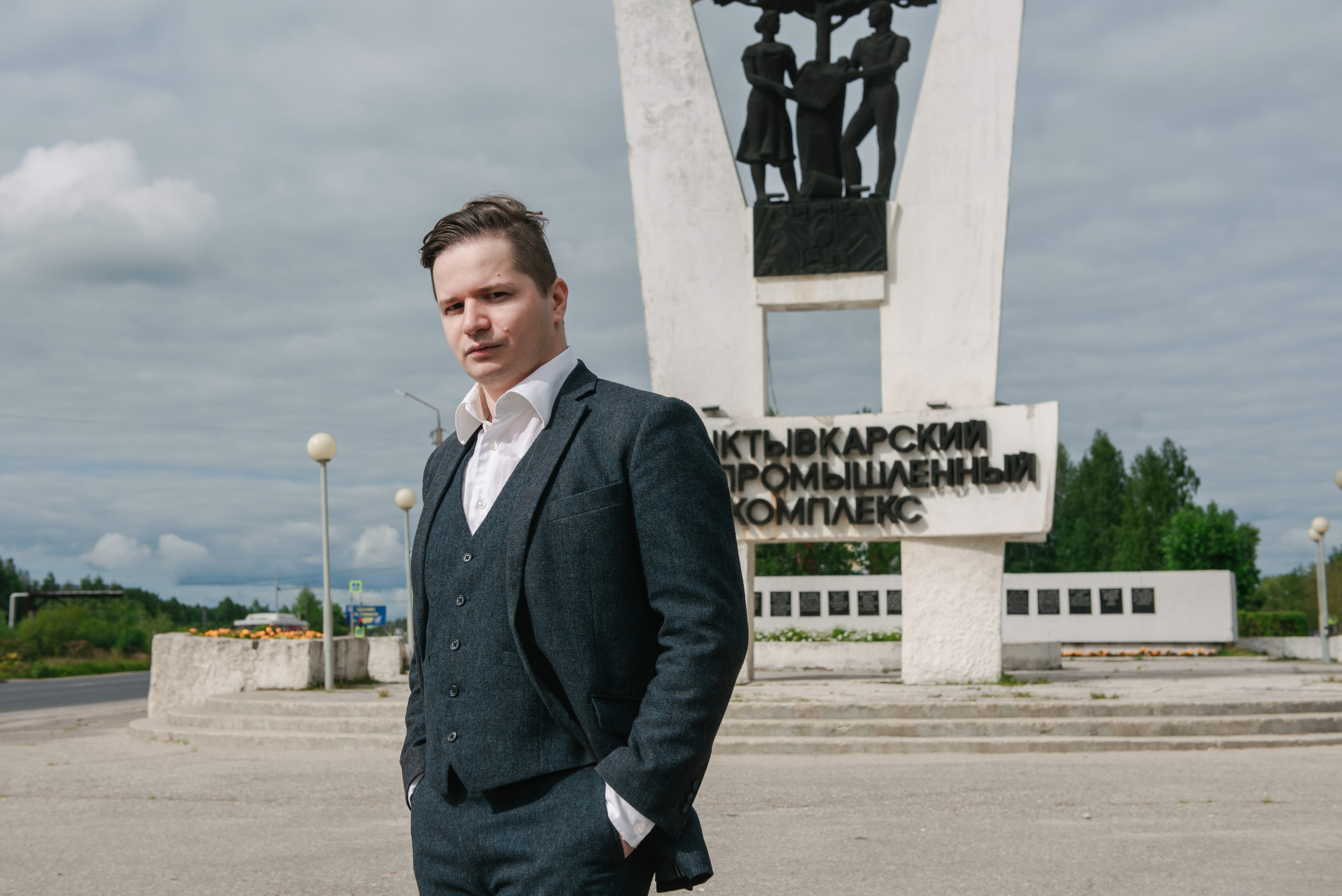

Leader of the Communist Party faction in the State Council of the Komi Republic
- In office 4 November 2021 – 20 February 2024
- Preceded by: Oleg Mikhailov
- Succeeded by: Yekaterina Dyachkova (acting)

Member of the State Council of the Komi Republic
- In office 27 October 2021 – 10 November 2024
- Preceded by: Oleg Mikhailov
- Succeeded by: Nikolai Udoratin

Personal details
- Born: 19 June 1989 (age 37) Syktyvkar, Komi ASSR, Russian SFSR, Soviet Union
- Party: Yabloko (2012–2013); Libertarian Party of Russia (2019–2026)
- Education: Saint Petersburg State University; Nevsky Institute of Language and Culture; Higher School of Economics; Kutafin Moscow State Law University
- Occupation: Lawyer, politician, human rights defender

Victor Vorobyov (Russian: Ви́ктор Ви́кторович Воробьёв; born 19 June 1989) is a Russian lawyer, human rights defender and opposition politician. He was a member of the State Council of the Komi Republic from 2021 to 2024 and led its Communist Party faction despite not belonging to the party. In 2022 he became the first sitting Russian deputy to be placed on the government's "foreign agents" register. His mandate ended in November 2024 following the introduction of a federal ban on "foreign agents" holding elected office.

== Early life and student activism ==
Vorobyov was born in Syktyvkar to two university lecturers. He moved to Saint Petersburg and studied at Saint Petersburg State University and the Higher School of Economics; he later completed master's degrees in political science and law at the latter.

He helped organise independent student representation at Saint Petersburg State University and led the local branch of the Russian Student Union. In a 2011 interview, he said the student council had secured round-the-clock access to university dormitories for residents and changes to the university's internet charges there.

== Legal and human rights work ==
Vorobyov has worked on election-law disputes and cases concerning academic rights and freedom of assembly. He represented university staff in successful challenges to dismissals and exclusions from elections for academic leadership posts. He has also worked with the rights groups OVD-Info and Apologia of Protest. In 2020 he represented activists prosecuted for pickets against constitutional amendments in the Komi Republic; all six cases against the activists were discontinued.

Vorobyov has represented applicants before the European Court of Human Rights in freedom-of-assembly cases. He was himself an applicant in Vorobyev and Others v. Russia, a case concerning the compulsory retention of internet communications and access to them by security agencies. On 5 September 2024 the Court found a violation of Article 8 of the European Convention on Human Rights in the joined applications.

== Political career ==
Vorobyov joined Yabloko in 2012 and left in 2013 after the expulsion of Saint Petersburg politician Maxim Reznik, for whom he subsequently worked as a legislative aide. From 2013 to 2015 he worked for the Saint Petersburg branch of Alexei Navalny's Progress Party and represented it in litigation over the refusal to register its regional branch. The courts found the refusal unlawful, but the branch was not ultimately registered.

He later worked on the legal teams of opposition candidates in the 2017 Moscow and 2019 Saint Petersburg municipal elections. He was a member of the Saint Petersburg electoral commission from 2019 to 2021 and the Komi Republic electoral commission from 2020 to 2021. In 2021 he argued against an initial refusal to register Yabloko politician Boris Vishnevsky for the Saint Petersburg legislature; the city commission overturned the refusal.

Vorobyov was described as a libertarian while serving as a Communist Party faction leader, but was not a member of the Communist Party. In 2023 the newspaper Sobesednik identified him as a member of the Libertarian Party of Russia.

=== State Council of the Komi Republic ===
Vorobyov stood on the Communist Party's list in the 2020 regional election. After Oleg Mikhailov won a seat in the State Duma in 2021, Vorobyov received his vacated seat in the State Council. He was elected leader of the Communist Party faction in November 2021 despite remaining outside the party.

In the legislature he opposed proposed national QR code requirements for access to public places during the COVID-19 pandemic and criticised a proposed reform restricting local self-government. In 2022 he asked President Vladimir Putin to issue a decree formally ending Russia's mobilisation, prompting a written response from the presidential administration. In 2024 he proposed allowing State Council members to speak in the Komi language, with time provided for translation. His proposals were rejected, but the council adopted an alternative measure doubling the speaking time for remarks requiring interpretation.

== Opposition to the war and foreign-agent designation ==
On 28 February 2022 Vorobyov publicly condemned the Russian invasion of Ukraine. He was detained at an anti-war protest in Saint Petersburg on 6 March and sentenced to 15 days' administrative detention. He was later fined over his anti-war statement. The State Council temporarily barred him from speaking at its meetings and removed him from its presidium.

On 1 April 2022 the Ministry of Justice listed him in the then-existing register of media "foreign agents". In court filings, the ministry cited, among other payments, a refund for a British train ticket and payments for legal work for rights organisations. Vorobyov challenged the designation, but the Syktyvkar City Court rejected his claim in June 2022. In July 2022 the State Council separately removed him from his full-time paid parliamentary post, citing findings by a committee that had examined his income declaration. He retained his seat and faction leadership; Vorobyov said the action was politically motivated. In 2023 he faced administrative proceedings for failing to add a "foreign agent" label to parliamentary inquiries and a proposed resolution on a referendum on direct elections for local leaders.

Vorobyov was among the applicants in Kobaliya and Others v. Russia. In its judgment of 22 October 2024, the European Court of Human Rights found that the Russian "foreign agent" regime had violated the applicants' freedom of expression and association, and, in the case of designated individuals, their right to respect for private life.

In September 2024 the Federal Security Service searched Vorobyov's home in connection with a criminal investigation involving his brother. He was questioned as a witness and was not charged. On 24 October the State Council voted to terminate his mandate if he remained on the "foreign agents" register on 11 November. He remained listed, and his mandate ended on that date. Communist Party deputies left the chamber in protest at the vote.

In July 2026 the Ministry of Justice added an organisation called the Libertarian Party of Russia to the "foreign agents" register and named Vorobyov among its participants. The rights group First Department said the ministry's list conflated members of two separate organisations using that name.
