= List of members of the 7th Russian State Duma who were not re-elected =

There were a total of 440 members of the State Duma at the end of the 7th convocation. 450 members of State Duma were elected in the 2021 legislative election.

A total of 151 incumbent State Duma members declined to seek re-election. Among retiring members are Vice Speaker Igor Lebedev (LDPR), Chair of the Committee on Health Dmitry Morozov (United Russia), and Chair of the Committee on Issues of Family, Women and Children Tamara Pletnyova (CPRF). The most prominent State Duma member to lose renomination is six-term deputy Nikolay Gonchar (United Russia), former Budget Committee Chairman who lost the primary in the Central constituency to municipal deputy Karen Aperyan.

Three Committee chairmen lost re-election to the State Duma, including Chairwoman of the Committee on Control and Rules Olga Savastyanova (United Russia), Chairman of the Committee on Economic Policy, Industry, Innovative Development, and Entrepreneurship Sergey Zhigarev (LDPR) and Chairman of the Committee on Nationalities Valery Gazzaev (SR-ZP).

== Retired ==
Following incumbent State Duma members declined to seek re-election:

Retired members of the 7th State Duma
Portrait	Name	Constituency	Party	Period
	Bator Aduchiev	party list	United Russia	2016–2021
	Tatyana Alekseeva	Kemerovo	United Russia	2011–2021
	Vladimir Afonsky	Novomoskovsk	United Russia	2011–2021
	Aleksey Balyberdin	Nizhny Tagil	United Russia	2016–2021
	Grigory Balykhin	party list	United Russia	2007–2021
	Ruslan Balbek	party list	United Russia	2016–2021
	Yury Berezutsky	party list	United Russia	2016–2021
	Natalya Boyeva	Kanevskaya	United Russia	2016–2021
	Sergey Bozhenov	Belgorod	United Russia	2016–2021
	Oksana Bondar	Magadan	United Russia	2016–2021
	Vladimir Bortko	Central	CPRF	2011–2021
	Rasul Botashev	Karachay-Cherkessia	United Russia	2016–2021
	Mikhail Bugera	party list	United Russia	1995–2007, 2016–2021
	Valery Buzilov	Izhevsk	United Russia	2016–2021
	Aleksandr Vasilyev	party list	United Russia	2011–2021
	Aleksey Voyevoda	party list	United Russia	2016–2021
	Aleksandr Vorobyov	party list	United Russia	2016–2021
	Yushaa Gazgireev	party list	United Russia	2016–2021
	Vera Ganzya	party list	CPRF	2014–2021
	Farit Ganiev	party list	United Russia	2016–2021
	Nikolay Gerasimenko	party list	United Russia	1995–2021
	Andrey Golushko	Lyubinsky	United Russia	2016–2021
	Mikhail Gulevsky	party list	United Russia	2016–2021
	Aldar Damdinov	Buryatia	United Russia	2016–2021
	Igor Divinsky	Eastern	United Russia	2016–2021
	Lyubov Dukhanina	Orekhovo-Borisovo	United Russia	2016–2021
	Vladimir Yevlanov	Krasnodar	United Russia	2016–2021
	Sergey Yesyakov	Penza	United Russia	2011–2021
	Anton Zharkov	Preobrazhensky	United Russia	2011–2021
	Aleksandr Zhupikov	Rasskazovo	United Russia	2016–2021
	Aleksey Zolotaryov	Seimsky	United Russia	2020–2021
	Valery Ivanov	party list	United Russia	2012–2021
	Sergey Ivanov	party list	LDPR	2003–2021
	Aleksey Izotov	Sterlitamak	United Russia	2016–2021
	Radik Ilyasov	party list	United Russia	2011–2016, 2021
	Ramzil Ishsarin	party list	United Russia	2016–2021
	Valentina Kabanova	Orekhovo-Zuyevo	United Russia	2008–2021
	Sergey Kalashnikov	party list	LDPR	1993–1998, 2011–2015, 2020–2021
	Andrey Kalichenko	Novosibirsk	United Russia	2016–2021
	Aleksandr Kaminsky	party list	United Russia	2016–2021
	Tatyana Kasayeva	party list	United Russia	2016–2021
	Aleksey Kobilev	party list	United Russia	2016–2021
	Yevgeny Kosyanenko	party list	United Russia	2016–2021
	Aleksandr Kravets	party list	CPRF	1995–2007, 2011–2021
	Tatyana Krivenko	party list	United Russia	2018–2021
	Sergey Kryuchek	party list	SR-ZP	2016–2021
	Anna Kuvychko	Volgograd	United Russia	2016–2021
	Maksim Kudryavtsev	Central	United Russia	2016–2021
	Oleg Lavrov (Note: withdrew from the party list)	party list	LDPR	2016-2021
	Igor Lebedev	party list	LDPR	1999–2021
	Anatoly Litovchenko	Korkino	United Russia	2016–2021
	Vyacheslav Lysakov	Kuntsevo	United Russia	2011–2021
	Aleksey Lyashchenko	party list	United Russia	2016–2021
	Vasily Maksimov	Engels	United Russia	2012–2021
	Nadezhda Maksimova	Khakassia	United Russia	2003–2021
	Irina Maryash	party list	United Russia	2016–2021
	Vladimir Melnik	party list	United Russia	2016–2021
	Boris Mendelevich	party list	United Russia	2018–2021
	Irshat Minkin	Central	United Russia	2016–2021
	Yelena Mitina	Skopin	United Russia	2015–2021
	Dmitry Morozov	Cheryomushki	United Russia	2016–2021
	Olga Okuneva (Note: withdrew from the primaries)	Roslavl	United Russia	2016–2021
	Yury Oleynikov	Serpukhov	United Russia	2016–2021
	Gennady Onishchenko	Tushino	United Russia	2016–2021
	Andrey Palkin	Kotlas	United Russia	2016–2021
	Yelena Panina	Nagatinsky	United Russia	1997–1999, 2003–2021
	Anatoly Petrov	party list	United Russia	2016–2021
	Natalia Pilyus	party list	United Russia	2017–2021
	Tamara Pletnyova	party list	CPRF	1993–2021
	Vladimir Pozdnyakov	party list	CPRF	2011–2021
	Aleksey Ponomaryov	party list	CPRF	1993–2003, 2007–2021
	Oksana Pushkina	Odintsovo	United Russia	2016–2021
	Zugura Rakhmatullina	Beloretsk	United Russia	2011–2021
	Nikolay Ryzhak	party list	SR-ZP	2016–2021
	Svetlana Savchenko	Yevpatoria	United Russia	2016–2021
	Buvaysar Saytiev	party list	United Russia	2016–2021
	Natalya Sanina	party list	United Russia	2016–2021
	Tatyana Saprykina	party list	United Russia	2016–2021
	Dmitry Svatkovsky	Nizhny Novgorod	United Russia	2018–2021
	Vladimir Sinyagovsky	Tuapse	United Russia	2016–2021
	Konstantin Slyshchenko (Note: withdrew from the primaries)	Kamchatka	United Russia	2016–2021
	Sergey Sopchuk	Vladivostok	United Russia	2016–2021
	Aleksandr Starovoytov	party list	LDPR	2011–2021
	Anatoly Tikhomirov	Jewish	United Russia	2016–2021
	Ivan Firyulin	party list	United Russia	2016–2021
	Aleksandr Fokin	party list	United Russia	2003–2021
	Rinat Khayrov	Almetyevsk	United Russia	2011–2021
	Alikhan Kharsiev	Ingushetia	United Russia	2016–2021
	Aleksey Khokhlov	Ivanovo	United Russia	2016–2021
	Tatyana Tsybizova	Krasnoarmeysky	United Russia	2016–2021
	Umakhan Umakhanov	Northern	United Russia	2016–2021
	Valentin Chayka	party list	United Russia	1999–2011, 2012–2021
	Mikhail Chernyshyov	Southern	United Russia	2016–2021
	Sergey Chindyaskin	party list	United Russia	2011–2021
	Martin Shakkum	Krasnogorsk	United Russia	1999–2021
	Vasily Shishkoedov	party list	United Russia	2016–2021
	Pavel Shperov	party list	LDPR	2016–2021
	Maksim Shchablykin	Shakhty	United Russia	2016–2021

== Ran for other offices ==
Following State Duma members declined to seek re-election and opted to run for other offices (all of them ran for regional parliaments).

Members of the 7th State Duma who ran for other offices
Portrait	Name	Constituency	Party	Period	Notes
	Lidia Antonova	Lyubertsy	United Russia	2016–2021	Elected to the Moscow Oblast Duma
	Yury Bobryshev	Novgorod	United Russia	2019–2021	elected to the Novgorod Oblast Duma and became its Speaker
	Vladimir Bokk	Tolyatti	United Russia	2016–2021	elected to the Samara Regional Duma
	Alexander Bryksin	party list	United Russia	2011–2021	elected to the Kursk Oblast Duma and appointed to the Federation Council
	Viktor Zobnev	Rubtsovsk	United Russia	2016–2021	elected to the Altai Krai Legislative Assembly and appointed to the Federation Council
	Vladimir Katenev	North West	United Russia	2016–2021	ran for Legislative Assembly of Saint Petersburg but withdrew from the election
	Aleksandr Klykanov	party list	United Russia	2016–2021	elected to the Duma of Astrakhan Oblast
	Aleksey Krasnoshtanov	Angarsk	United Russia	2016–2021	elected to the Legislative Assembly of Irkutsk Oblast
	Dmitry Perminov	party list	United Russia	2016–2021	elected to the Legislative Assembly of Omsk Oblast and appointed to the Federation Council
	Vladimir Pushkaryov	party list	United Russia	2016–2021	elected to the Tyumen Oblast Duma
	Aleksandr Pyatikop	Kaliningrad	United Russia	2016–2021	ran for Kaliningrad Oblast Duma from Communists of Russia but was withdrawn by the party
	Valentina Rudchenko	Chukotka	United Russia	2016–2021	elected to the Duma of Chukotka Autonomous Okrug and became its Speaker
	Viktor Shreyder	Omsk	United Russia	2011–2021	ran for Legislative Assembly of Omsk Oblast but withdrew from the primaries
	Aleksandr Yaroshuk	Central	United Russia	2018–2021	elected to the Kaliningrad Oblast Duma and appointed to the Federation Council

== Lost renomination ==
Only United Russia held open primaries (called "preliminary voting") for the 2021 legislative election on 24–30 May 2021. A total of 41 incumbents were defeated or not included into the official party list. Despite party's claims that every candidate should go through the process of primaries in fact several nominated in the general election candidates did not participate in the primaries in 2021. These candidates are mostly Governors who are not likely to step down from the governorship, but this group also include other examples: all 5 party list leaders (Defense Minister Sergey Shoygu, Foreign Minister Sergey Lavrov, doctor Denis Protsenko, co-chairwoman of the All-Russia People's Front Yelena Shmelyova and Children's Rights Commissioner Anna Kuznetsova), former Head of Tuva Sholban Kara-ool, former Ulyanovsk Oblast Governor Sergey Morozov, chairman of the Duma Defense Committee Vladimir Shamanov and long-time State Duma member Artur Chilingarov.

Members of the 7th State Duma who lost renomination
Portrait	Name	Constituency	Party	Period	Primaries result
	Zaur Askenderov	party list	United Russia	2012–2021	16th place in Dagestan party list. Elected to the People's Assembly of the Republic of Dagestan and became its Speaker
	Marat Bariev	party list	United Russia	2011–2021	13th place in Tatarstan party list
	Marina Bespalova	party list	United Russia	2016–2021	3rd place in Ulyanovsk constituency and 4th place in Ulyanovsk Oblast party list
	Vladimir Bogodukhov	party list	United Russia	2016–2021	7th place in Lipetsk Oblast party list. Elected to the Lipetsk Oblast Council of Deputies
	Rodion Bukachakov	Altai	United Russia	2016–2021	5th place in Altai constituency
	Aleksey Burnashov	Chusovoy	United Russia	2016–2021	2nd place in Chusovoy constituency
	Oleg Bykov	party list	United Russia	2017–2021	9th place in Altai Krai party list
	Aleksandr Vasilenko	party list	United Russia	2011–2021	16th place in Perm Krai party list
	Tatyana Voronina	Kursk	United Russia	2016–2021	3rd place in Kursk constituency
	Sergey Vostretsov	Western	United Russia	2014–2021	4th place in Western constituency
	Magomed Gadzhiev	party list	United Russia	2003–2021	2nd place in Dagestan party list
	Murad Gadylshin	party list	United Russia	2016–2021	14th place in Tatarstan party list
	Nikolay Govorin	Chita	United Russia	2015–2021	2nd place in Chita constituency and 3rd place in Zabaykalsky Krai party list
	Nikolay Gonchar	Central	United Russia	1995–2021	2nd place in Central constituency
	Yevgeny Grishin	party list	United Russia	2011–2016, 2021	21st place in Tatarstan party list
	Irina Guseva	Volzhsky	United Russia	2014–2021	5th place in Volzhsky constituency and 8th place in Volgograd Oblast party list
	Vladimir Drachev	Vsevolozhsk	United Russia	2016–2021	2nd place in Vsevolozhsk constituency
	Sergey Zheleznyak	Perovo	United Russia	2007–2021	61st place in Moscow party list
	Aleksey Zagrebin	Udmurtia	United Russia	2016–2021	7th place in Udmurtia party list
	Nikolay Zemtsov	party list	United Russia	2016–2021	8th place in Oryol Oblast party list
	Aleksandr Ishchenko	Nevinnomyssk	United Russia	2003–2011, 2016–2021	3rd place in Nevinnomyssk constituency
	Andrey Kozenko	Simferopol	United Russia	2016–2021	5th place in Crimea party list
	Vladimir Krupennikov	party list	United Russia	2011–2021	79th place in Moscow party list
	Yury Levitsky	party list	United Russia	2016–2021	13th place in Dagestan party list. Elected to the People's Assembly of the Republic of Dagestan and became its First Vice-Speaker
	Aleksey Lisovenko	party list	United Russia	2021	1st place in Leningradsky constituency and 16th place in Moscow party list. In the constituency UR endorsed Galina Khovanskaya (SR-ZP)
	Abdulmazhid Magramov	Southern	United Russia	2016–2021	3rd place in Southern constituency and 17th place in Dagestan party list
	Ivan Medvedev	Syktyvkar	United Russia	2016–2021	4th place in Syktyvkar constituency and 5th place in Komi party list
	Valentina Mironova	Unecha	United Russia	2016–2021	5th place in Bryansk Oblast party list
	Yury Mishcheryakov	Orenburg	United Russia	2016–2021	2nd place in Orenburg constituency and 6th place in Orenburg Oblast party list
	Denis Moskvin	Prioksky	United Russia	2016–2021	3rd place in Prioksky constituency
	Marina Mukabenova	Kalmykia	United Russia	2007–2021	8th place in Kalmykia constituency and 9th place in Kalmykia party list
	Aleksandr Nosov	party list	United Russia	2016–2021	1st place in Mikhaylovka constituency. In the constituency UR nominated Vladimir Plotnikov
	Mergen Oorzhak	Tuva	United Russia	2016–2021	2nd place in Tuva constituency
	Natalya Poklonskaya	party list	United Russia	2016–2021	4th place in Crimea party list. Withdrew from the primary but remained on the ballot
	Gadzhimet Safaraliev	party list	United Russia	1999–2021	19th place in Dagestan party list
	Magomed Selimkhanov	party list	United Russia	2011–2021	2nd place in Chechnya party list
	Yevgeny Serper	Zhigulyovsk	United Russia	2007–2021	2nd place in Zhigulyovsk constituency
	Fatikh Sibagatullin	Privolzhsky	United Russia	2007–2021	2nd place in Privolzhsky constituency
	Svetlana Solntseva	party list	United Russia	2016–2021	5th place in Mari El party list
	Ivan Teterin	Babushkinsky	United Russia	2016–2021	32nd place in Moscow party list
	Ravil Khusnulin	party list	United Russia	2016–2021	2nd place in Almetyevsk constituency and 18th place in Tatarstan party list
	Leonid Cherkesov	Cheboksary	United Russia	2016–2021	4th place in Chuvashia party list. Elected to the State Council of the Chuvash Republic and became its Speaker
	Yevgeny Shulepov	Vologda	United Russia	2016–2021	2nd place in Vologda constituency. Elected to the Legislative Assembly of Vologda Oblast
	Abdulgamid Emirgamzaev	Central	United Russia	2016–2021	2nd place in Central constituency and 12th place in Dagestan party list
	Dmitry Yurkov	Arkhangelsk	United Russia	2016–2021	2nd place in Arkhangelsk constituency, ran for Arkhangelsk Oblast Assembly of Deputies but lost in the single-mandate constituency

== Lost re-election ==
Following State Duma members lost re-election in 2021:

Members of the 7th State Duma who lost re-election
Portrait	Name	Constituency	Party	Period	Notes
	Andrey Andreychenko	party list	LDPR	2017-2021	3rd place in Vladivostok constituency and failed to get elected through party list. Elected to the Legislative Assembly of Primorsky Krai
	Andrey Baryshev	Chelyabinsk	United Russia	2016–2021	ran in the Metallurgichesky constituency as an independent but failed to qualify for the ballot
	Ivan Belekov	party list	United Russia	2016–2021	failed to get elected through party list
	Nikita Berezin	party list	LDPR	2020-2021	4th place in Voronezh constituency and failed to get elected through party list
	Ildar Bikbaev	Blagoveshchensk	United Russia	2016–2021	failed to get elected through party list
	Andrey Vetluzhskikh	party list	United Russia	2016–2021	failed to get elected through party list
	Yury Volkov	party list	LDPR	2016-2021	Switched to SR-ZP. 3rd place in Chita constituency and failed to get elected through party list
	Valery Gazzaev	party list	SR-ZP	2016–2021	failed to get elected through party list
	Tatyana Gogoleva	party list	United Russia	2016–2021	failed to get elected through party list. Elected to the Duma of Khanty-Mansi Autonomous Okrug in October 2021
	Valery Yelykomov	party list	United Russia	2016–2021	failed to get elected through party list
	Mikhail Yemelyanov	Nizhnedonskoy	SR-ZP	1995-2021	2nd place in Nizhnedonskoy constituency and failed to get elected through party list
	Maksim Zaytsev	party list	LDPR	2019-2021	5th place in Georgiyevsk constituency and failed to get elected through party list
	Sergey Zhigarev	Shchyolkovo	LDPR	2011-2021	failed to get elected through party list
	Dmitry Ionin	party list	SR-ZP	2017–2021	failed to get elected through party list
	Anatoly Karpov	party list	United Russia	2011–2021	failed to get elected through party list. Received mandate of Olga Batalina on 27 October 2021
	Sergey Katasonov	party list	LDPR	2012-2021	failed to get elected through party list
	Andrey Kovalenko	Yaroslavl	United Russia	2020–2021	2nd place in Yaroslavl constituency
	Natalya Kuvshinova	party list	United Russia	2016–2021	failed to get elected through party list
	Andrey Kuzmin	Amur	LDPR	2018–2021	3rd place in Amur constituency
	Dmitry Kuzyakin	party list	CPRF	2021	2nd place in Mordovia constituency and failed to get elected through party list. Elected to the State Assembly of the Republic of Mordovia
	Vasilina Kulieva	Dauria	LDPR	2011-2012, 2016–2021	4th place in Dauria constituency and failed to get elected through party list
	Svetlana Maksimova	Tver	United Russia	2011–2021	failed to get elected through party list. Elected to the Legislative Assembly of Tver Oblast
	Nikolay Malov	party list	United Russia	2017–2021	failed to get elected through party list. Elected to the State Council of the Chuvash Republic
	Sergey Marinin	party list	LDPR	2011-2021	5th place in Radishchevo constituency and failed to get elected through party list
	Igor Molyakov	party list	SR-ZP	2020–2021	2nd place in Cheboksary constituency and failed to get elected through party list. Elected to the State Council of the Chuvash Republic
	Anton Morozov	party list	LDPR	2016-2021	failed to get elected through party list
	Sergey Natarov	party list	LDPR	2016-2021	2nd place in Krasnoyarsk constituency and failed to get elected through party list. Elected to the Legislative Assembly of Krasnoyarsk Krai
	Gadzhimurad Omarov	party list	SR-ZP	1999-2003, 2016–2021	2nd place in Southern constituency and failed to get elected through party list
	Ilya Osipov	party list	United Russia	2016–2021	failed to get elected through party list. Elected to the Yaroslavl Oblast Duma
	Olga Pavlova	party list	United Russia	2016–2021	failed to get elected through party list
	Gavril Parakhin	party list	LDPR	2021	7th place in Yakutsk constituency and failed to get elected through party list
	Vitaly Pashin	party list	LDPR	2016-2021	7th place in Zlatoust constituency and failed to get elected through party list
	Ivan Pilyaev	Komsomolsk-na-Amure	LDPR	2019-2021	3rd place in Komsomolsk-na-Amure constituency and failed to get elected through party list
	Dmitry Pyanykh	party list	LDPR	2020-2021	3rd place in Saratov constituency and failed to get elected through party list
	Yury Petrov	party list	United Russia	2011–2021	failed to get elected through party list. Received mandate of Aleksandr Avdeyev on 27 October 2021
	Olga Savastyanova	party list	United Russia	2016–2021	2nd place in Syktyvkar constituency
	Dmitry Sazonov	Kudymkar	United Russia	2016–2021	failed to get elected through party list
	Igor Sapko	party list	United Russia	2016–2021	failed to get elected through party list
	Andrey Svintsov	party list	LDPR	2011-2021	failed to get elected through party list. Received mandate of Vladimir Zhirinovsky on 1 June 2022 (Note: https://www.kommersant.ru/doc/5381037 Естественно убыл)
	Yelena Serova	Kolomna	United Russia	2016–2021	failed to get elected through party list
	Igor Stankevich	Promyshlenny	United Russia	2016–2021	2nd place in Promyshlenny constituency
	Yelena Strokova	party list	LDPR	2016-2021	failed to get elected through party list
	Maksim Suraev	Balashikha	United Russia	2016–2021	failed to get elected through party list
	Igor Toroshchin	party list	LDPR	2016-2021	3rd place in Asbest constituency and failed to get elected through party list
	Kirill Cherkasov	party list	LDPR	2007-2021	3rd place in Kirov constituency and failed to get elected through party list
	Irina Chirkova	party list	SR-ZP	2011-2016, 2020–2021	2nd place in Kotlas constituency and failed to get elected through party list
	Oleg Shein	party list	SR-ZP	1999-2011, 2016–2021	2nd place in Astrakhan constituency and failed to get elected through party list. Elected to the Duma of Astrakhan Oblast
	Aleksandr Sherin	party list	LDPR	2014-2021	3rd place in Skopin constituency and failed to get elected through party list
	Inga Yumasheva	party list	United Russia	2016–2021	failed to get elected through party list

== See also ==
- List of members of the 7th Russian State Duma
- 2021 Russian legislative election
