= Ekaterina Gribkova =

Russian politician

- Екатерина Грибкова
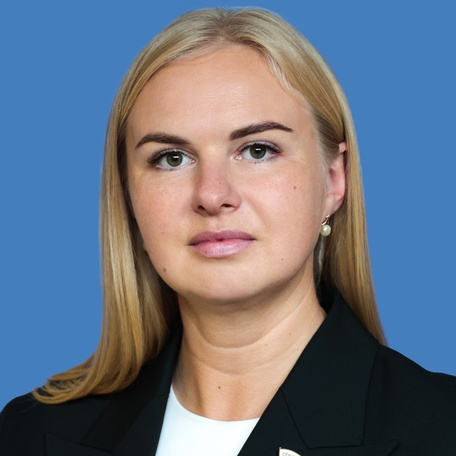

Senator of the Russian Federation from the Komi Republic
- Incumbent
- Assumed office 29 September 2025
- Preceded by: Elena Shumilova

Personal details
- Born: 17 April 1989 (age 37) Vizinga, Komi ASSR, Russian SFSR, Soviet Union
- Education: Syktyvkar State University

Ekaterina Georgievna Gribkova (Russian: Екатерина Георгиевна Грибкова; born 17 April 1989) is a Russian politician serving as a senator of the Russian Federation from the legislative authority of the Komi Republic since 2025. She is a member of the Federation Council Committee on Social Policy.

== Early life and education ==
Gribkova was born on 17 April 1989 in Vizinga, Sysolsky District, in the Komi ASSR.

In 2012, she graduated from Syktyvkar State University with a qualification in social work. In 2014, she received a bachelor's degree in law from the same university.

== Career in social policy and the Komi government ==
After graduating from university, Gribkova worked in the social welfare system and executive authorities of the Komi Republic. From 2012 to 2013, she was a social work specialist at the republican social and health centre Maksakovka. From 2013 to 2014, she was an expert at the Centre for Legal Support, and from 2014 to 2016 she worked as a chief specialist-expert at the Agency of the Komi Republic for Social Development.

In 2016, Gribkova served as an adviser to a deputy chair of the government of the Komi Republic. From 2016 to 2017, she headed a section in the Ministry of Health of the Komi Republic. In 2017, she became head of the Centre for the Provision of State Services in the Field of Social Protection in Sysolsky District, a post she held until 2021.

On 25 March 2021, Gribkova was appointed Minister of Labour, Employment and Social Protection of the Komi Republic. From 11 October 2023, she served as Deputy Chair of the Government and Minister of Labour, Employment and Social Protection of the Komi Republic. From March to September 2025, she was a deputy chair of the government of the Komi Republic.

== State Council and Federation Council ==
On 14 September 2025, Gribkova was elected to the State Council of the Komi Republic of the eighth convocation. She ran on the United Russia party list in the single electoral district and headed the Ezhva regional group of candidates. On 25 September 2025, the elected head of the Komi Republic, Rostislav Goldstein, dismissed her from the post of deputy chair of the government of the Komi Republic.

On 29 September 2025, following a nomination by the United Russia faction in the State Council of the Komi Republic, which held 25 of the 30 seats, Gribkova was vested with the powers of a senator of the Russian Federation representing the legislative authority of the Komi Republic. Twenty-nine of the 30 deputies voted for her, with one abstention. The seat representing the legislative authority of Komi had been vacant since the early termination of Elena Shumilova's mandate in June 2025. After moving to the Federation Council, Gribkova resigned her seat in the State Council.

Since 2025, Gribkova has been a member of the Federation Council Committee on Social Policy.
