= Komi State Pedagogical Institute =

Higher education institution in the Komi Republic, Russia

- Коми государственный педагогический институт
- Active: 1931–2013
- Location: Komi Republic, Russia
- Language: Russian

Komi State Pedagogical Institute (Russian: Коми государственный педагогический институт) is a higher education institution founded on 18 November 1931 to train teachers. Reorganized on 14 February 2013 as a merger with Syktyvkar State University.

== History ==
On 18 November 1931, by the Decree of the Council of People's Commissars of the RSFSR, the Komi State Pedagogical Institute was established in the city of Syktyvkar. A. F. Bogdanov was appointed the first rector of the institute. Among the first teachers were professors Vasily Lytkin and A. S. Sidorov, a total of seventeen teachers, including one professor, eight associate professors, five assistants and three teachers. At the end of 1931, the first set of applicants was recruited, a total of one hundred and twenty-two people were accepted, of which: one hundred people for the first year, and twenty-two people for the second from those transferred to the institute from other higher educational institutions. The opening of the educational process took place on 21 February 1932, the curricula of the institute at that time were drawn up for three years. The structure of the institute consisted of three departments: chemical and biological, physical and mathematical (technical) and social and literary, as well as nine general institute departments included in these departments.

From 1934 to 1954, the Teachers' Institute (two-year) functioned at the Komi State Pedagogical Institute to train teachers of an incomplete secondary school. Since 1935, the structure of the institute has changed, on the basis of three departments, four faculties were created: physics and mathematics, natural sciences, philology (language and literature) and history. In 1936, in addition to full-time, a correspondence department was also opened. In 1938, the first academic building was built for the institute, and in 1965, the second. From 1936 to 1941, about eight hundred teachers graduated from the walls of the institute to educational institutions of the Komi ASSR. In 1981, by the Decree of the Presidium of the Supreme Soviet of the USSR "for achievements in training" the Komi State Pedagogical Institute was awarded the Order of the Badge of Honor.

For the period from 1990 to 2014, the Institute had full-time and part-time departments, eight faculties: Geography and Biology, Philology, Foreign Languages, Physics and Mathematics, Pedagogy and Methods of Primary Education, Technology and Entrepreneurship, Additional Teaching Professions, Additional Professional Education, seven general institute departments: pedagogy, sociology and political science, philosophy, history and economic theory, general psychology, physical education and foreign languages. More than three thousand nine hundred students were trained at the correspondence and full-time departments. In 1991, the Komi republican lyceum-boarding school of part-time education for gifted children from rural areas was established at the institute, in the amount of more than five hundred students. From 1932 to 2014, the institute trained about thirty thousand highly qualified specialist teachers, of which more than one thousand two hundred were subsequently awarded the honorary title of Honored Teachers of the Republican and All-Union (All-Russian) level.

On 14 February 2013, by order of the Ministry of Education and Science of the Russian Federation, as a result of the reorganization of the Komi State Pedagogical Institute, it was merged with Syktyvkar State University.

== Awards ==
- Order of the Badge of Honour (UPVS USSR in 1981 - "for achievements in training personnel")

== Management ==
- Alexander Filimonovich Bogdanov (1931-1932)
- Vasily Alexandrovich Aibabin (1932-1933)
- Dmitry Ivanovich Shulepov (1933-1935)
- Nikolai Afanasyevich Mikheev (1935-1937, 1945–1948)
- Pitirim Ivanovich Razmyslov (1937-1938)
- Dan Timofeevich Stepulo (1938-1941)
- Gennady Petrovich Balin (1938, 1941)
- Konstantin Dmitrievich Mitropolsky (1941-1943)
- Andrey Grigoryevich Nazarkin (1943-1945)
- Alexander Alexandrovich Kokarev (1948-1953)
- Nikolai Vasilievich Shuktomov (1953-1956)
- Petr Efimovich Kuklev (1956-1958)
- Nikolai Prokopyevich Beznosikov (1961-1972)
- Vasily Nikolaevich Akhmeev (1972-2003)
- Valeryan Nikolaevich Isakov (2003-2011)
- Mikhail Dmitrievich Kitaigorodsky (2011-2014)

== Notable faculty and alumni ==
- Vasily Lytkin - Doctor of Philology, Academician of the Finnish Academy of Sciences. Laureate of the State Prize of the Komi ASSR. Kuratova, Honored Worker of Science and Technology of the RSFSR and Komi ASSR.
- Marina Pylayeva - Honored Master of Sports of Russia, silver medalist of the World Championship and bronze medalist of the European Championship
- Vladimir Torlopov - Chairman of the State Council of the Komi Republic, head of the Komi Republic, member of the Federation Council

== Literature ==
- Республика Коми. Энциклопедия : В 3 т. / Коми науч. центр УрО РАН; Рощевский М. П. (гл. ред.) и др. - Сыктывкар : Коми кн. изд-во, Т. 2. — 1999. — 575 с. — ISBN 5-7555-0657-4
- Коми государственному педагогическому институту — 70 лет / М-во образования Рос. Федерации; В.Н. Ахмеев и др. - Сыктывкар : КГПИ, 2002. — 126 с.
- Летопись Коми государственного педагогического института (1932—2014) / сост.: В. Н. Исаков и др., Министерство науки и высшего образования Российской Федерации, ФГБОУ ВО "СГУ им. Питирима Сорокина"; Сыктывкар, 2019.

== Links ==
- "КГПИ — 90". Museum complex of the Syktyvkar State University named after I.I. Pitirim.
