= Pazhga =

Location in Komi Republic, Russia

Pazhga Пажга
- Rural locality
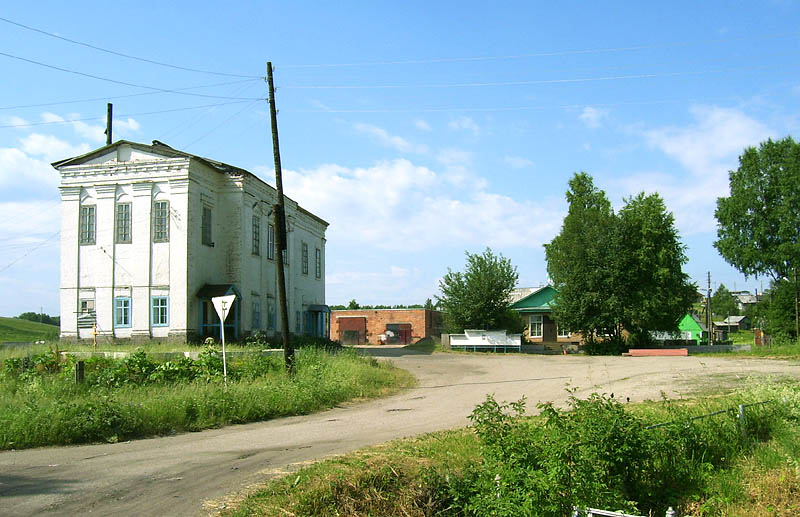
- View of Pazhga
- Interactive map of Pazhga
- Location of Pazhga Pazhga (European Russia)
- Coordinates: 61.38775°N 50.57753°E
- Country: Russia
- Federal subject: Komi Republic
- Administrative district: Syktyvdinsky District
- Founded: 1586
- Elevation: 127 m (417 ft)

Population (2010 Census)
  - Total: 1,362
- Postal code: 168214 OK TMO ID: 87628435101

Pazhga (Russian: Пажга, Komi: Паджга, Padzhga) is a rural locality (a selo) in Syktyvdinsky District of Komi Republic, Russia. Population: 1,362 (2010 census); 1,674 (2002 census); 1,528 (1989 Soviet census).
