= Irwin Weil =

American academic (1928 - 2026)

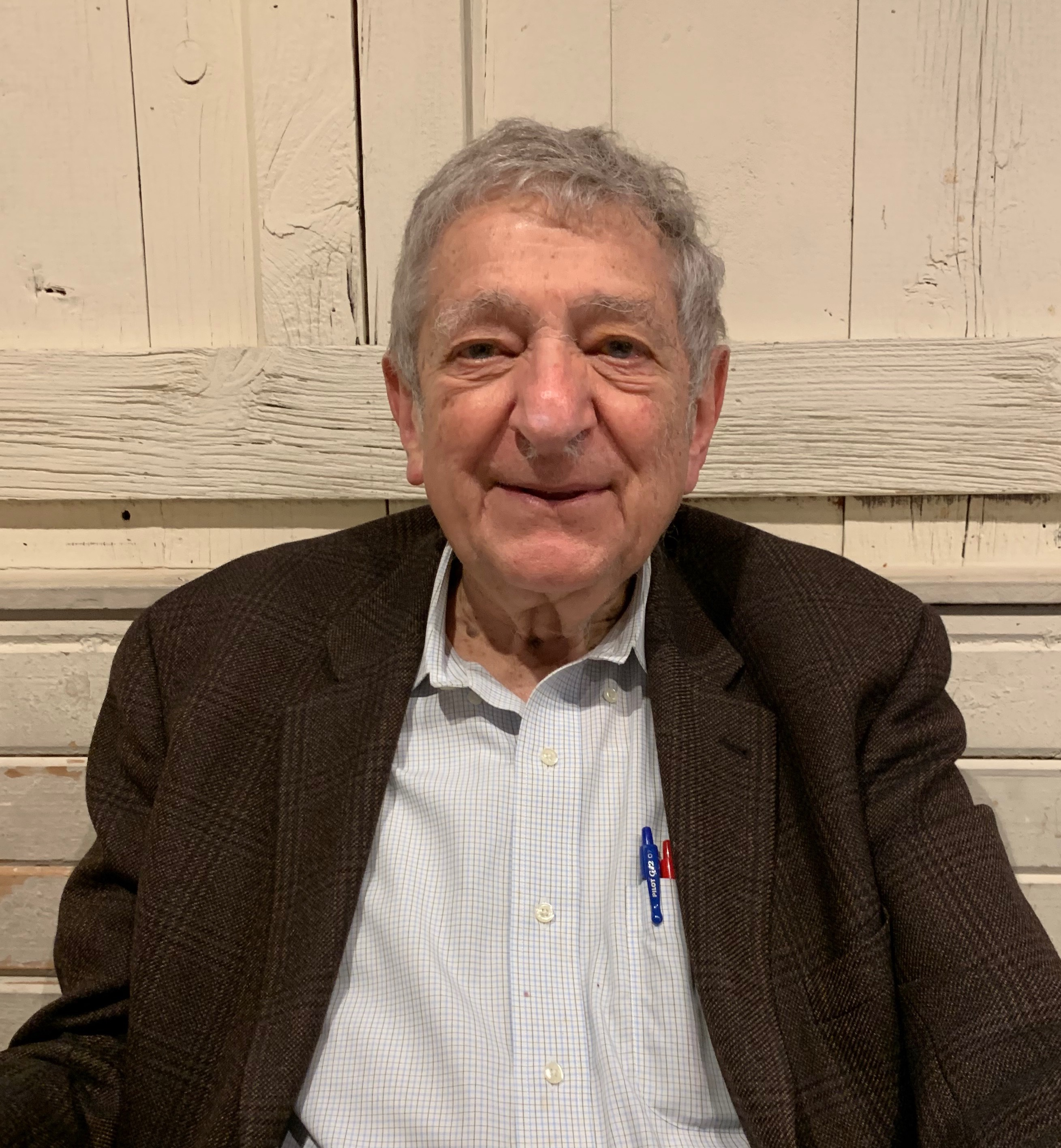
- Born: 1928 (age 97–98); Cincinnati, Ohio, U.S.
- Died: January 30, 2026; Evanston, Illinois
- Education: University of Chicago (B.A., M.A.) Harvard University (Ph.D.)
- Scientific career
- Fields: Russian literature and Culture, U.S./Russian cultural exchange
- Workplaces: Northwestern University

Notes
- Son of Sidney Weil

Irwin Weil (1928 - 2026) was a Professor Emeritus in the Department of Slavic Languages and Literature at Northwestern University. He was noted for his work in promoting cultural exchange and mutual understanding between the USA and the USSR/Russia, and for attracting large numbers of students to his courses. He recorded a popular series of lectures Classics of Russian Literature for The Teaching Company in 2005. He died of natural causes on January 30, 2026 at 97 years of age.

== Biography ==
Irwin Weil was born in 1928 in Cincinnati, Ohio, of German Jewish and Lithuanian Jewish immigrants. His father, Sidney, was a former owner of the Cincinnati Reds baseball team. Initially majoring in economics at the University of Chicago, he was drawn to Slavic studies after discovering Dostoevsky's The Brothers Karamazov in a required literature course and being (in his words) "knocked for a loop". He reports that he ran to a bookstore, picked up a copy of Crime and Punishment, read it in two days, and resolved to learn the language of such a great body of literature.

Weil received his bachelor's degree from the University of Chicago in 1948 and his master's degree in Slavic studies in 1951. After three years of working on a Soviet census for the U.S. Library of Congress, Weil began his Ph.D. at Harvard University, where he had received a Ford Foundation fellowship to work toward his doctorate in Slavic studies. After receiving the degree in 1960, he taught at Brandeis University.

While at Brandeis, Weil was a professor of Russian literature and linguistics. He was influential in the development and growth of the Slavic studies program at Brandeis. Weil's first major work—a dissertation on the development of the writing style of Maksim Gorky—was completed in 1958. His other works include Notes on the Contemporary Soviet Literary Scene and Soviet Literary Activities.

== At Northwestern University ==
Weil moved to Northwestern University in 1966. He is published widely in the field of Russian literature and culture, with special attention to the classics of 19th-century Russian literature and the Soviet Period. His principal focus has been on the connections between Russian literature and music.

One of the most popular teachers at Northwestern, his classes in Russian literature attract hundreds of students each year. His most popular course, Introduction to the Soviet Union and Successor States, draws as many as 800 students each Spring Quarter.

"(Weil) is legendary in our department for getting enrollment numbers that no one else can touch," says Clare Cavanagh, current chairwoman of the Slavic department. The large enrollment in Slavic Studies has been attributed to Weil, whose reputation for warmth and passion for his subject, for caring about his students, and for occasionally breaking into Russian song to illustrate a point has attracted generations of students.

== Work in promoting cultural exchange and understanding ==
Weil is noted for his efforts to promote cultural exchange and understanding between USSR/Russia and the United States. Recently, he has worked with Professor Marina Kaul to establish an American Studies Center at the Moscow University for the Humanities. He is a founder of the American Council of Teachers of Russian (ACTR) and a member of the Board of Trustees of the Nevsky Institute of Language and Culture. He is a frequent commentator on US-Russian relations.

== Lecture videos ==
Weil recorded a set of 36 half-hour lectures entitled Classics of Russian Literature for The Teaching Company. He was selected by the company after considering his teaching awards, published evaluations, newspaper articles and other sources to determine the best professors. The Teaching Company placed him in the top 1 percent of professors in the United States.

== Research interests ==
According to his listing on the Northwestern University faculty web page, Weil's research interests include:

- Russian literature and cultural history
- Jewish literature and cultural history
- Relations between poetry and music, literature and music
- USSR/Russia-USA cultural relations and exchange - extensive teaching, research, and work in the USSR and Russia - periodic lecturing and teaching in Russia, for forty years

== Partial list of publications ==
- Weil, Irwin Asher. Four Novels by Maksim Gor'kij. Thesis (Ph. D.)--Harvard University, 1960.
- Weil, Irwin (Autumn 1960). "Gor'kij's Relations with the Bolsheviks and Symbolists". The Slavic and East European Journal. 4 (3). American Association of Teachers of Slavic and East European Languages: 201–219. doi:10.2307/304177. JSTOR 304177.
- Weil, Irwin. Gorky: His Literary Development and Influence on Soviet Intellectual Life. New York: Random House, 1966.
- Weil, Irwin (1967). "Russian Literature and Modern English Fiction: A Collection of Critical Essays". The Slavic and East European Journal. 11. doi:10.2307/305413. JSTOR 305413.
- Pacific Northwest Conference on Foreign Languages, Irwin Weil, and Ralph Willis Baldner. Proceedings. [Victoria, B.C.]: University of Victoria, 1967.
- Weil, Irwin. Die Ostjuden in der Kulturgeschichte Europas; ein Blick in die russische Literatur-und Kulturgeschichte. Ingolstädter Vorträge, 1982. Ingolstadt, [W. Germany]: Der Zeitgeschichtlichen Forschungsstelle Ingolstadt, 1982.
