= Yekaterina Popova =

Russian politician

- Екатерина Попова

Member of the State Duma
- In office 12 December 1993 – 29 July 1994

Personal details
- Born: Yekaterina Mikhailovna Popova; 6 December 1941 Soviet Union
- Died: 29 July 1994 (aged 52) Russia

Yekaterina Mikhailovna Popova (Russian: Екатерина Михайловна Попова; 6 December 1941 – 29 July 1994), was a Russian politician who was a member of the State Duma from 1993 until her death in 1994.

== Biography ==
Before being elected to the State Duma, she was the chief physician of the Republican Hospital of Syktyvkar. From 1990 to 1994, she was a People's Deputy of the Komi Republic.

In the State Duma, Popova was a member of the Committee on Nationalities and a member of the Credentials Commission. She was a member of the Women of Russia faction.

She died on 29 July 1994.

== See also ==
- List of members of the State Duma of Russia who died in office
