= Sidney Weil =

American business executive and baseball team owner

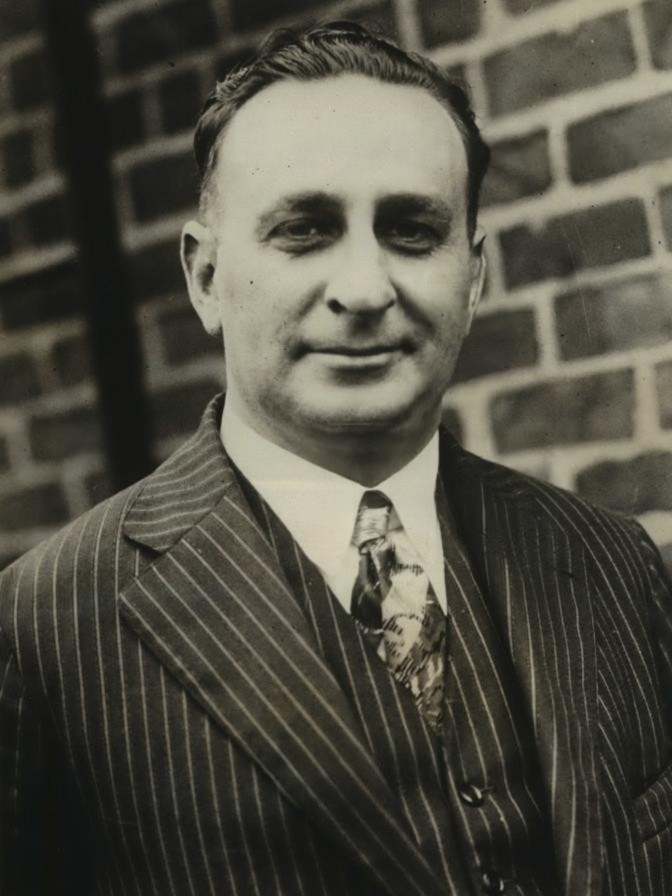
- Weil in 1929
- Born: December 23, 1891
- Died: January 14, 1966 (aged 74); Cincinnati, Ohio
- Occupation(s): Executive in automotive sales and insurance sales
- Known for: Owner of the Cincinnati Reds (1930–1933)
- Spouse: Florence Weil née Levy (1893–1998)
- Children: 3, including Irwin Weil

Sidney Weil (December 23, 1891 – January 14, 1966) was an American business executive and salesperson, who owned the Cincinnati Reds of the National League within Major League Baseball (MLB) for four seasons at the beginning of the 1930s.

== Biography ==
Late in the 1929 season, Weil secretly acquired enough shares of the Cincinnati Reds to become the majority owner. His purchase, estimated at $635,000, occurred weeks prior to the Wall Street crash of 1929. During the four full seasons (1930–1933) that he owned the team, the Reds finished in last place in the National League three times, while accruing a record of 235–379 for a .383 winning percentage. In November 1933, Weil's majority ownership of the Reds was taken over by the Central Trust Bank. Powel Crosley Jr. bought the team in February 1934.

Weil was an executive of an auto sales company before buying the Reds. He filed for bankruptcy shortly after selling the Reds, listing liabilities of over $950,000. He moved to insurance sales in 1937, and sold over $1 million of insurance for 23 years in a row. Weil died in January 1966, as the result of a traffic collision in Cincinnati. He was survived by his wife, two daughters, and a son. His wife, Florence, died in 1998 at the age of 104. His son, Irwin, became a professor of Russian literature at Northwestern University.
