= Elena Shumilova =

Russian politician (born 1978)

- Елена Шумилова
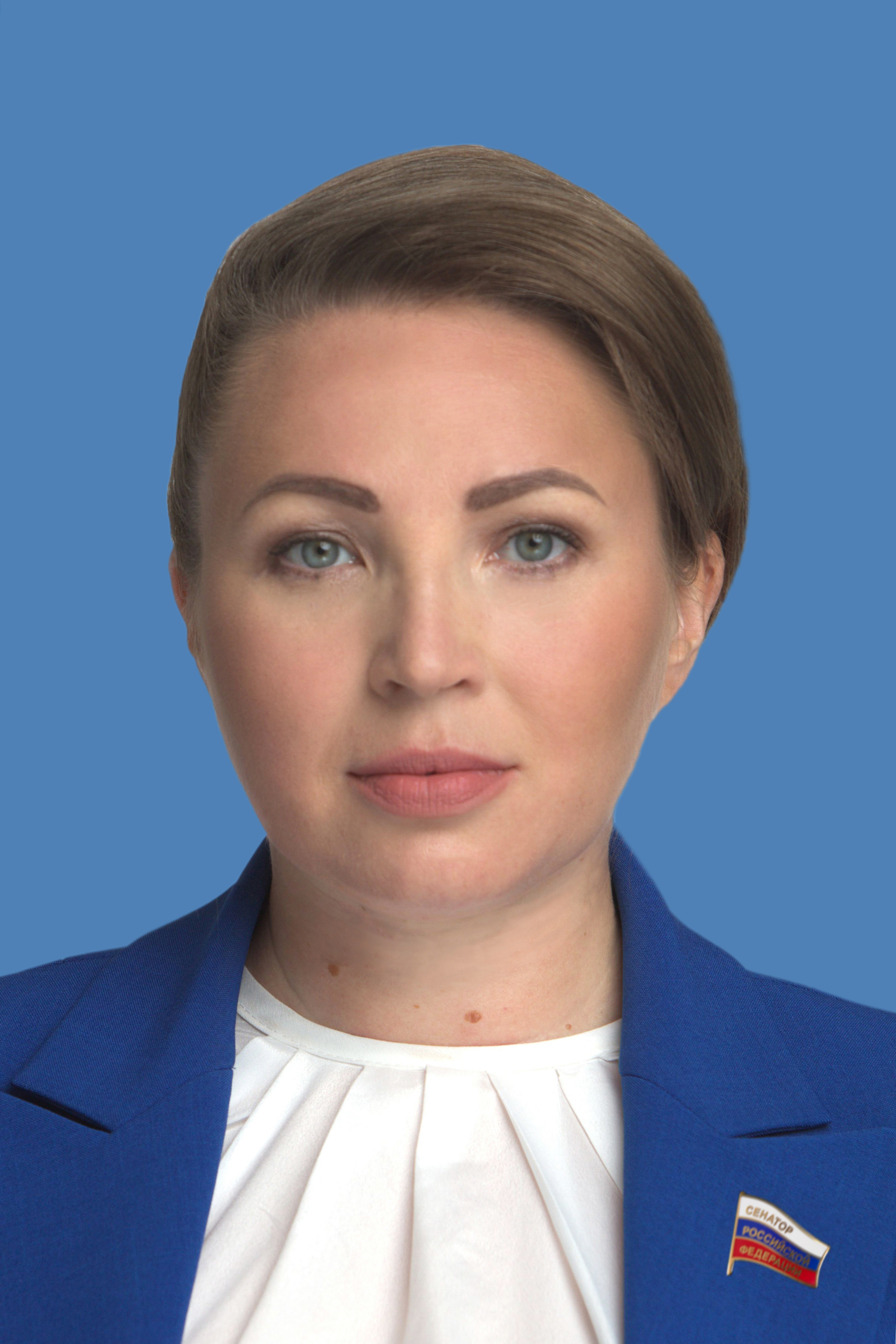

Senator from the Komi Republic
- Incumbent
- Assumed office 24 September 2020
- Preceded by: Valery Markov
- Succeeded by: Ekaterina Gribkova

Personal details
- Born: Elena Shumilova; 1 April 1978 (age 48) Koygorodsky District, Komi Autonomous Soviet Socialist Republic, Soviet Union
- Party: United Russia
- Education: Komi State Pedagogical Institute

Elena Borisovna Shumilova (Russian: Елена Борисовна Шумилова; born 1 April 1978) is a Russian politician and journalist who is serving as a senator from the Komi Republic since 24 September 2020.

== Biography ==
In 1998, Shumilova graduated from the Pedagogical College, named after Ivan Kuratov. In 2011, she also received a degree from the Komi State Pedagogical Institute. From 2000 to 2010, she worked as a journalist in the local republican media. In 2015, she was elected deputy of the Koygorodsky District council. The same year, she joined the All-Russia People's Front. On 13 September 2020, she became a senator from the Komi Republic.

As of October 19, 2022, Shumilova was under personal sanctions introduced by the European Union, the United Kingdom, the USA, Canada, Switzerland, Australia, Ukraine, New Zealand, for ratifying the decisions of the "Treaty of Friendship, Cooperation and Mutual Assistance between the Russian Federation and the Donetsk People's Republic and between the Russian Federation and the Luhansk People's Republic" and providing political and economic support for Russia's annexation of Ukrainian territories.
