= List of chairmen of the State Council of the Komi Republic =

Chairmen of the State Council of the Komi Republic

== Chairman of the Supreme Council ==
Name	Entered office	Left office
Yury Spiridonov	April 25, 1990	June 7, 1994

== Chairmen (speakers) of the State Council of the Komi Republic ==
Name	Entered office	Left office
Vladimir Torlopov	January 1995	January 23, 2001
Yevgeny Borisov	January 23, 2001	March 18, 2003
Ivan Kulikov	March 18, 2003	November 28, 2005
Alex Besnosikov (acting)	November 29, 2005	February 16, 2006
Marina Istikhovskaya	February 16, 2006	November 22, 2012
Igor Kovzel	November 22, 2012	September 28, 2015
Nadezhda Dorofeeva	September 28, 2015	incumbent
