= Sergey Karginov =

Russian politician (born 1969)

Sergey Karginov MP
- Сергей Каргинов
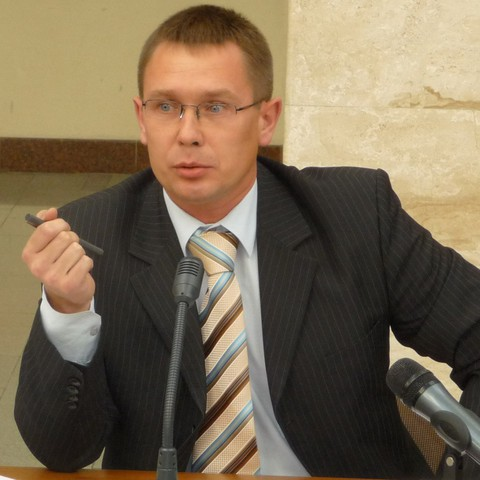

Member of the State Duma (Party List Seat)
- Incumbent
- Assumed office 21 December 2011

Personal details
- Born: 5 September 1969 (age 57) Vologda, RSFSR, USSR
- Party: Liberal Democratic Party of Russia
- Education: Vologda Institute of Law and Economics

Sergey Genrikhovich Karginov (Russian: Сергей Генрихович Каргинов; born 5 September 1969, Vologda) is a Russian political figure and a deputy of the 6th, 7th, and 8th State Dumas.

From 1987 to 1989, Karginov served in the Soviet Army. During the 1990s, he held various positions at industrial enterprises, including Koncor CJSC, Joker LLP, PAG LLP. In 1999, he initiated publishing of the magazine Tax news of the Vologda region, and in 2002-2003 he was the editor-in-chief of the journal. From 2000 to 2002, he was an advisor to the deputy of the State Duma. In 2003, he was elected deputy of the Legislative Assembly of the Vologda Oblast. In 2011, he was elected deputy of the 6th State Duma. In 2016 and 2021, he was re-elected deputy of the 7th and 8th State Dumas.

== Awards ==
Medal “CIS IPA. 25 Years” (March 27, 2017, Interparliamentary Assembly of the CIS) — for contributions to the development and strengthening of parliamentarism, for contributions to the development and improvement of the legal foundations of the Commonwealth of Independent States, and for fostering international relations and interparliamentary cooperation.

== Sanctions ==
He was sanctioned by the UK government in 2022 in relation to the Russo-Ukrainian War.
