= Ivan Medvedev =

Russian politician

- Иван Медведев
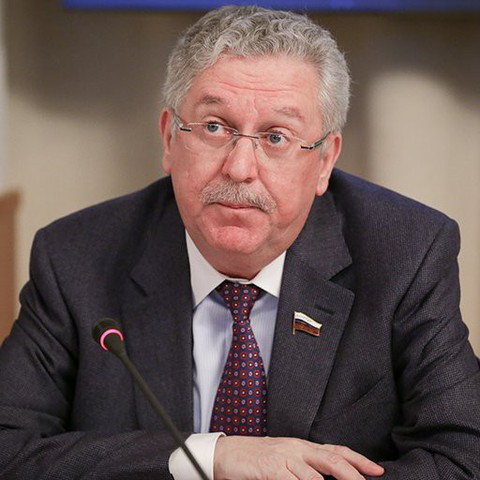

Member of the State Duma for the Komi Republic
- In office 18 September 2016 – 12 October 2021
- Preceded by: constituency re-established
- Succeeded by: Oleg Mikhailov

Member of the State Council of the Komi Republic
- In office March 2011 – 18 September 2016

Personal details
- Born: Ivan Vladimirovich Medevedev; 10 February 1955 (age 71) Ukhta, RSFSR, USSR
- Party: United Russia

Ivan Vladimirovich Medevedev (Russian: Иван Владимирович Медведев; born on 10 February 1955), is a Russian politician and energy economist, who is a former member of parliament, a deputy of the State Duma of the 7th convocation, a member of the United Russia faction, and member of the State Duma Energy Committee.

== Biography ==
Ivan Medvedev was born in Ukhta on 10 February 1955.

In 1977, he graduated from the Ukhta Industrial Institute with a degree in machinery and mechanisms for the forestry and woodworking industry.

In 1978 he was drafted into the Soviet Army, and in 1979 he was demobilized.

Since 1980, he worked in various engineering and management positions of the middle management of the Komienergo department.

In 1988, he was appointed to the position of deputy, later - first deputy general director for economics of the Komienergo association.

In 1988 he worked as the head of the planning and economic department of the department.

In 1992, he underwent retraining in the specialty "industry planning" at the St. Petersburg University of Economics and Finance.

Since 1993, he has worked in various managerial positions, was Deputy General Director, First Deputy for Economics and Finance.

In 1993, the association changed its form of ownership, becoming the joint-stock energy company Komienergo.

In 2006, he was appointed to the position of General Director of Joint-Stock Energy Company Komienergo, and in 2007 he was appointed executive director.

In 2008, AEK Komienergo was transformed into a branch of JSC IDGC of the North-West, led by himself.

In March 2011, Medvedev was nominated from the United Russia party to the State Council of the Republic, following the results of the elections he was elected a member of the State Council of the Komi Republic of the 5th convocation.

In 2015, he was transferred to the Department of Management of PJSC IDGC of the North-West as an adviser.

In September 2015, he was re-elected as a deputy to the State Council of the Komi Republic of the VI convocation.

In September 2016, Medvedev prematurely resigned as a member of the State Council in connection with his election on 18 September 2016 as a member of the State Duma of the VII convocation in single-mandate constituency No. 18.

He left the State Duma in 2021.

== Legislative activity ==
From 2016 to 2019, while serving as a deputy of the State Duma of the 7th convocation, he co-authored 42 legislative initiatives and amendments to draft federal laws.
