= Oleg Mikhailov =

Russian politician

- Олег Михайлов
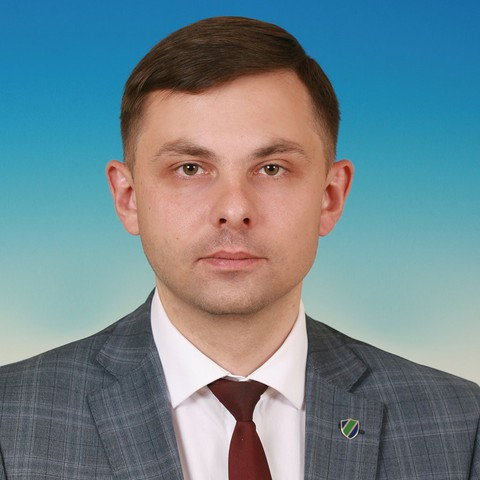

Member of the State Duma for the Komi Republic
- Incumbent
- Assumed office 12 October 2021
- Preceded by: Ivan Medvedev
- Constituency: Komi-at-large (No. 18)

Personal details
- Born: 6 January 1987 (age 39) Pechora, Komi ASSR, RSFSR, USSR
- Party: Communist Party of the Russian Federation
- Education: Syktyvkar State University

Oleg Alexeyevich Mikhailov (Russian: Олег Алексеевич Михайлов; born 6 January 1987) is a Russian political figure and a deputy of the 8th State Duma.

In 2007, Mikhailov joined the Communist Party of the Russian Federation. In 2011, he was elected deputy of the Council of the municipality of the Syktyvkar municipal district. In 2012, he started working at the Institute of Biology, Komi Scientific Center, Ural Branch of the Russian Academy of Sciences. From 2020 to 2021, he was the deputy of the State Council of the Komi Republic of the 7th convocation. Since September 2021, he has served as deputy of the 8th State Duma.
