= Vasily Lytkin =

Soviet Komi poet

- Born: December 1895; Tentyukovo, Russian Empire
- Died: August 27, 1981 (aged 85); Moscow, USSR
- Education: St. Petersburg University
- Writing career
- Pen name: Illya Vas
- Notable awards: State Prize of the Komi Autonomous Soviet Socialist Republic

Vasily Ilyich Lytkin (Russian: Васи́лий Ильи́ч Лы́ткин, Komi: Лыткин Илля Вась, Lytkin Illya Vas, also known by the pseudonym Illya Vas) was a Soviet Komi poet, translator, linguist, Finno-Ugrist, Doktor nauk. and member of Finnish Academy of Sciences (1969). He was a laureate of the State Prize of the Komi Autonomous Soviet Socialist Republic.

Lytkin was born in the village of Tentyukovo (Тентюково), near the Komi capital of Ust-Sysolsk (modern-day Syktyvkar; now the village is a microdistrict of Syktyvkar) in December 1895.

Lutkin studied in Helsinki and Budapest, and later published a historical analysis of the Komi language. He was the first Komi to study at St. Petersburg University.

In 1933, he was arrested and sentenced to five years, which he spent in the Dallag gulag labor camp. In 1956, he was fully rehabilitated. He researched the role of Stephen of Perm and published poetry under the pseudonym Illya Vas.

Lytkin published 11 monographs and over 300 scientific articles.

Starting in 1958, he was a member of the Union of Soviet Writers. He translated the works of Pushkin, Tyutchev, Mayakovsky, Demyan Bedny, Chukovsky into the Komi language.

Lytkin died on August 27, 1981, in Moscow.
