= Vylgort, Syktyvdinsky District, Komi Republic =

Rural locality in the Komi Republic, Russia

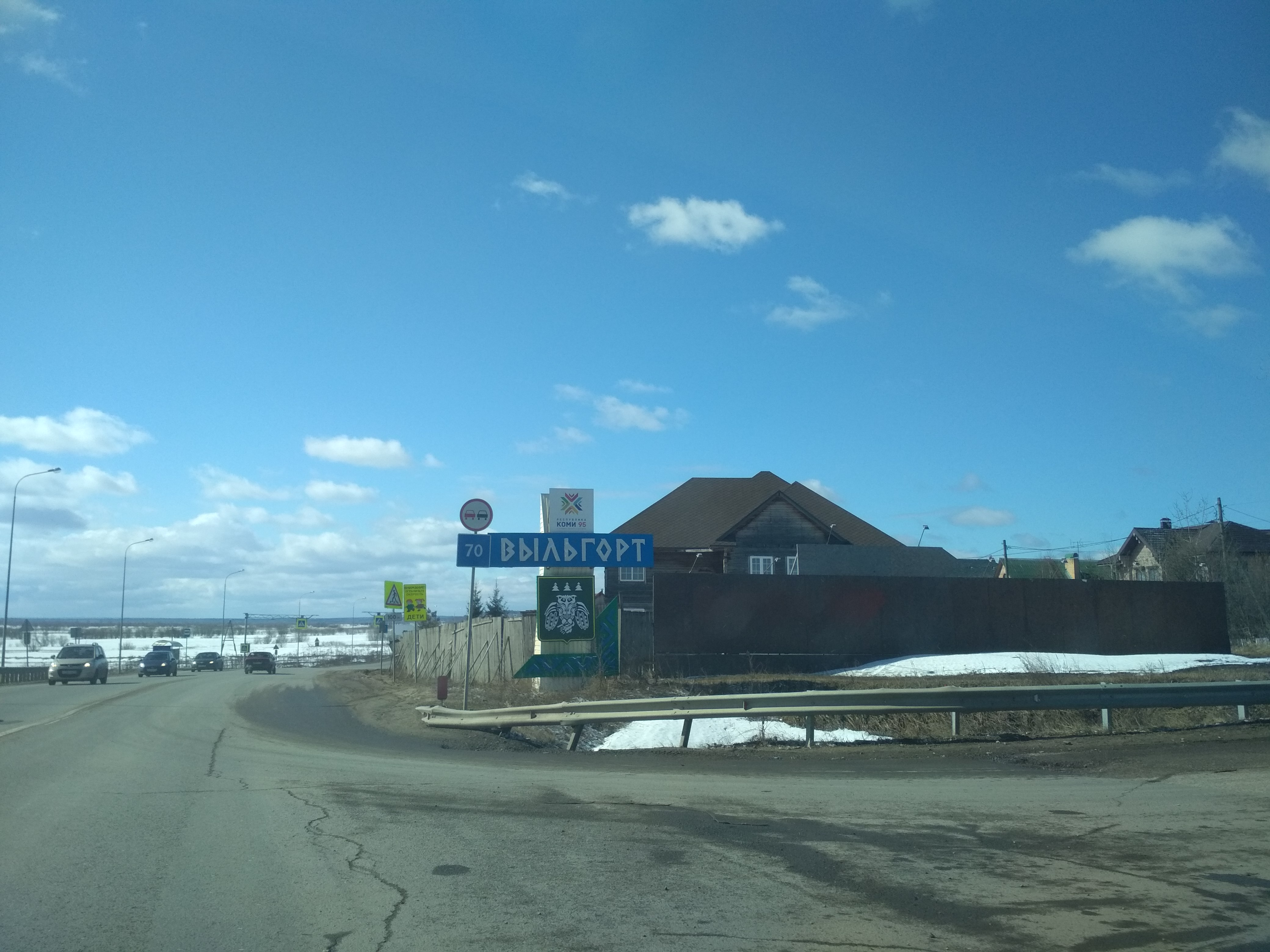
- Stela at the entrance to Vylgort, Komi Republic
- Interactive map of Vylgort, Syktyvdinsky District, Komi Republic
- Location of Vylgort, Syktyvdinsky District, Komi Republic
- Coordinates: 61°37′39″N 50°46′02″E
- Country: Russia
- Federal subject: Komi Republic
- Founded: 1586

Population
  - Estimate (2025): 10,746 )
- Time zone: UTC+3 (MSK)
- Postal code: 168220
- OKTMO ID: 87628405101

Vylgort (Russian: Выльгорт, Komi: Выльгорт, Vyľgort) is a rural locality (a selo) and the administrative center of Syktyvdinsky District of the Komi Republic, Russia. Population: 10,289 (2010 census); 10,211 (2002 census); 8,965 (1989 Soviet census).
