= Nevsky Institute of Language and Culture =

Coordinates: 59°57′43″N 30°17′09″E

- Невский Институт языка и культуры (НИЯК)
- Type: Public
- Established: 1996
- Location: St. Petersburg, Russia

The Nevsky Institute of Language and Culture is an educational institution in St. Petersburg, Russia. It is located in the Petrogradskaya District, within short walking distance from Krestovsky Island. Founded in April 1996, it offers degree programs in Linguistics and Linguistic Arts, Public Relations, Finance, Management, Accounting, Russian Studies, and European Studies.

The Nevsky Institute was founded to provide Russian language study programs for foreign students, but today hosts students from inside Russia, Belarus, Ukraine, Estonia, Moldova, and Azerbaijan as well as from the US, Great Britain, France and other countries, in a variety of academic programs. It is active in promoting exchange programs, including those with Spain, Greece, Slovenia, the UK, and the USA.

== Exchange students ==
Exchange students have the option to study for a single semester or a full academic year. To be eligible for this program, a prospective student must have a 2.5 combined retained GPA. Student must have four semesters of Russian. All exchange students must take at least one Russian language course (Russian as a Second Language). Each student is paired with a Russian student from Nevsky for weekly tutoring sessions. Students choose three other courses which they take together with Russian students. The courses could be from any of the three Nevsky departments: Public Relations, Linguistics and Intercultural Communication, Economics. Popular courses are: Russian History, Russian Literature, Politics and Intercultural Communication. Instructors provide exchange students with additional assistance and course materials. Students are allowed to take Arts, Theater, Dance and Music courses which are part of the Nevsky Certificate Program and are usually offered in the afternoon.
