= Syktyvdinsky District =

Syktyvdinsky District Сыктывдинский район (Russian)
- District

Other transcription(s)
  - Komi: Сыктывдін район
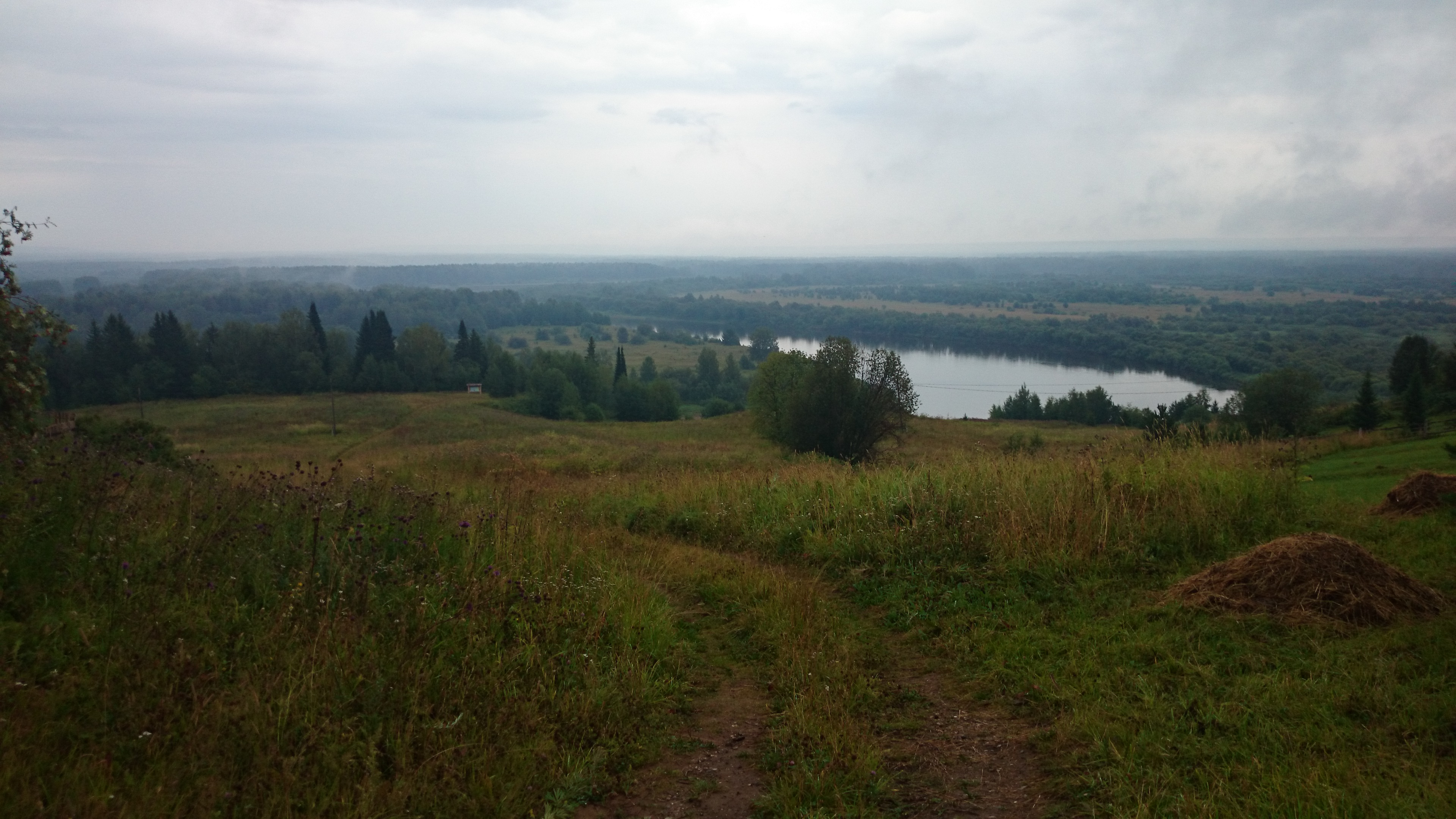
- Landscape in Syktyvdinsky District

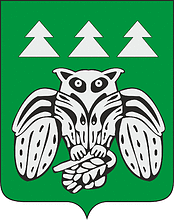
- Coat of arms
- Location of Syktyvdinsky District in the Komi Republic
- Coordinates: 61°37′N 50°45′E
- Country: Russia
- Federal subject: Komi Republic
- Administrative center: Vylgort

Area
  - Total: 7,405 km^{2} (2,859 sq mi)

Population (2010 Census)
  - Total: 22,660
  - Density: 3.060/km^{2} (7.926/sq mi)
  - Urban: 0%
  - Rural: 100%

Administrative structure
  - Administrative divisions: 10 selo administrative territories, 3 settlement administrative territories
  - Inhabited localities: 49 rural localities

Municipal structure
  - Municipally incorporated as: Syktyvdinsky Municipal District
  - Municipal divisions: 0 urban settlements, 13 rural settlements
- Time zone: UTC+3 (MSK)
- OKTMO ID: 87628000
- Website: http://syktyvdin.ru

Population of Syktyvdinsky District
- 2010 Census: 22,660
- 2002 Census: 24,226
- 1989 Census: 27,396
- 1979 Census: 26,391

Syktyvdinsky District (Russian: Сыктывдинский райо́н; Komi: Сыктывдін район, Syktyvdïn rajon) is an administrative district (raion), one of the twelve in the Komi Republic, Russia. It is located in the south of the republic. The area of the district is 7,405 square kilometers (2,859 sq mi). Its administrative center is the rural locality (a selo) of Vylgort. As of the 2010 Census, the total population of the district was 22,660, with the population of Vylgort accounting for 45.4% of that number.

== Administrative and municipal status ==
Within the framework of administrative divisions, Syktyvdinsky District is one of the twelve in the Komi Republic. The district is divided into ten selo administrative territories and three settlement administrative territories, which comprise forty-nine rural localities. As a municipal division, the district is incorporated as Syktyvdinsky Municipal District. Its thirteen administrative territories are incorporated as thirteen rural settlements within the municipal district. The selo of Vylgort serves as the administrative center of both the administrative and municipal district.
