= Olga Savastianova =

Russian politician

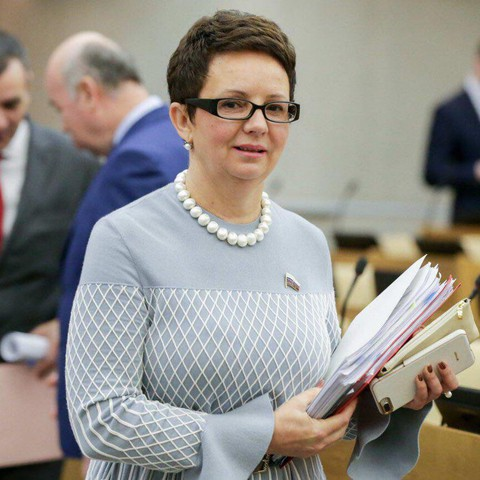
Olga Savastianova

Olga Viktorovna Savastianova (Russian: Ольга Викторовна Савастьянова; born 5 April 1960) is a Russian politician, and was a former deputy for the United Russia party in the 7th State Duma of the Russian Federation. She was the head of the committee on the Rules and Organization of the State Duma.
