= Syktyvkar State University =

Pitirim Sorokin Syktyvkar State University
- Сыктывкарский государственный университет имени Питирима Сорокина; Питирим Сорокин нима Сыктывкарса канму университет
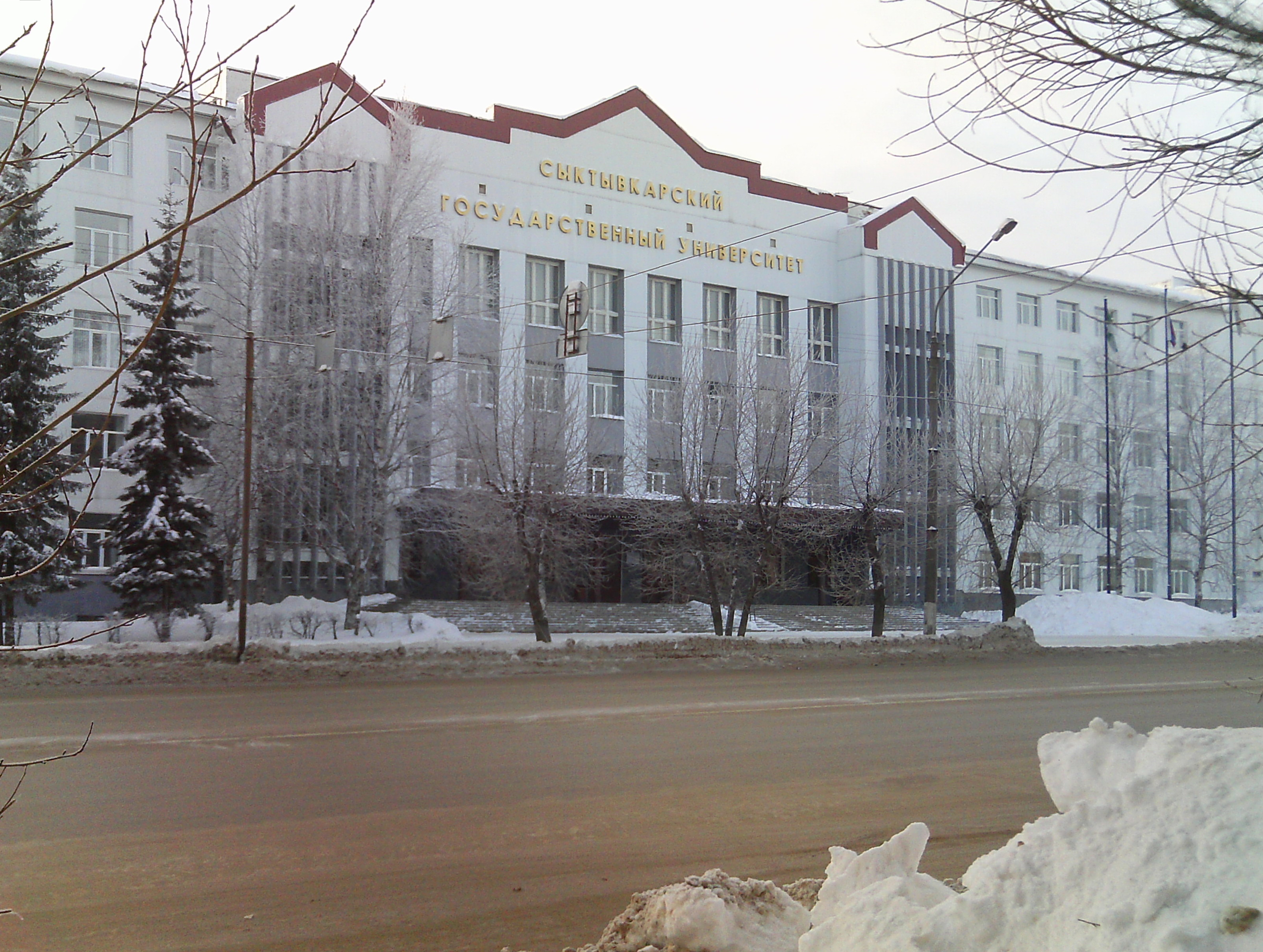
- Former name: USSR's 50th Anniversary State University of Syktyvkar
- Established: 1972
- Rector: Sotnikova Olga Alexandrovna
- Location: October Prospekt 55, Syktyvkar, Komi Republic, Northwestern Federal District, Russia; 61.6645°N 50.8210°E
- Website: syktsu.ru

Pitirim Sorokin Syktyvkar State University (Russian: Сыктывкарский государственный университет имени Питирима Сорокина; Komi: Питирим Сорокин нима Сыктывкарса канму университет) is a public university in the city of Syktyvkar, the capital of the Komi Republic (Russia). With over 9,000 full-time students and more than 600 faculty members, it is the largest institution of higher education in the Komi Republic.

== History ==
Syktyvkar State University was founded in 1972, making it the oldest university in the Komi Republic.

The university includes 13 institutes and 52 departments and offers programmes at bachelor, master and doctoral levels in the fields of the mathematical and natural sciences, technology, humanities, law, medicine, economics, management, pedagogics and art.

Syktyvkar State university actively participates in international partnership programmes and cooperation. It is a member of the cooperative network University of the Arctic, which concerns with education and research in the North. During the fall and winter 2007-2008, Syktyvkar State University was selected to host the Associate Regional Office of Undergraduate Studies for Russia of the University of the Arctic. The collaboration has been paused after the beginning of the Russo-Ukrainian War in 2022.

The university is associated with the Russian Mineralogical Society.

In March 2009 the university established the Sorokin Research Center to undertake research and publication of archive materials on the sociologist Pitirim Sorokin from international sources, mainly from the Sorokin's special collection at the University of Saskatchewan in Canada.
