= Green Alternative (Russia) =

Green Alternative Зелёная альтернатива
- Abbreviation: GA (English); ЗА (Russian)
- Chairman: Ruslan Khvostov
- Deputy chairman: Stepan Soloviev
- Informal leader: Vasya Lozhkin
- Founded: 10 March 2020
- Registered: 7 April 2020
- Dissolved: 26 April 2026
- Merged into: Russian Ecological Party "The Greens"
- Headquarters: 17, Dukhovskoy Lane, Moscow
- Ideology: Green politics
- Political position: Centre-left
- Colours: Green
- Seats in the Federation Council: 0 / 170
- Seats in the State Duma: 0 / 450
- Seats in the Regional Parliaments: 2 / 3,983

Website
- zaecology.ru

Green Alternative (GA; Russian: Зелёная альтернатива; ЗА, romanized: Zelyonaya al'ternativa, ZA) was a green political party in Russia. It was founded in December 2019 as a social movement by its chairman Ruslan Khvostov. It held its founding party congress in March 2020 and was officially registered as a political party with the Ministry of Justice the following month. The party won two seats in the 2020 regional elections: one in the Komi Republic and another in the Chelyabinsk Oblast. In 2026, the party merged into the Russian Ecological Party "The Greens" after five years of non-participation in regional and national elections.

== History ==
Green Alternative was created as a social movement in December 2019 by environmental activist and former Mestnye member Ruslan Khvostov. Documents for its registration as a political party were submitted to the Ministry of Justice in February 2020. The founding party congress of Green Alternative was subsequently held on 10 March 2020, and Khvostov was elected party leader with almost 80% of the vote. The artist Vasya Lozhkin was also elected as the "informal leader" of the party. On 7 April 2020, the party was officially registered by the Ministry of Justice and in May it received the right to participate in elections.

The party contested the 2020 regional elections, receiving 10% of the vote in the Komi Republic and 5.4% in the Chelyabinsk Oblast, and winning a seat in both federal subjects' parliaments. Because the party won seats in regional parliaments, it gained the right to participate in federal parliamentary elections without collecting signatures.

In the 2021 legislative elections, Green Alternative came twelfth, winning 0.64% of the popular vote and no seats.

On 26 April 2026, in anticipation of the 2026 State Duma election, the Green Alternative and the Russian Ecological Party "The Greens" merged into a single party, with the heads of regional branches and party activists of the Green Alternative joining The Greens. Konstantin Atayan, Executive Secretary of The Greens Federal Council, noted that the unification "is necessary to take the environmental agenda to a new level and to ensure that leaders who care about nature can successfully participate in elections." The merger occurred because since 2025, the Green Alternative lost the right to nominate candidates for the State Duma without collecting signatures due to its non-participation in regional elections.

== Ideology ==
Green Alternative did not associate itself exclusively with the environmental movement, calling itself a "moderate left-wing environmental party of the European type".

== Leadership ==
Ruslan Khvostov was the chairman of the party, while Stepan Soloviev was deputy chairman. Vasya Lozhkin was the "informal leader" of the party.

== Election results ==
State Duma election results of Green Alternative
Election	Party leader	Performance					Rank	Government
Election	Party leader	Votes	%	± pp	Seats	+/–	Rank	Government
2021	Ruslan Khvostov	357,855	0.64%	New	0 / 450	New	12th	Extra-parliamentary
