= State Council of the Komi Republic =

Regional parliament of Komi, Russia

State Council of the Komi Republic Государственный Совет Республики Коми (Russian) Коми Республикаса Каналан Сöвет (Komi)
- 7th legislature

Type
- Type: Unicameral

Leadership
- Chairman: Alexandr Makarenko, United Russia since 29 September 2025

Structure
- Seats: 30
- Political groups: United Russia (25) CPRF (2); LDPR (1); SRZP (1) New People (1)

Elections
- Last election: 12-14 September 2025
- Next election: 2030

Meeting place
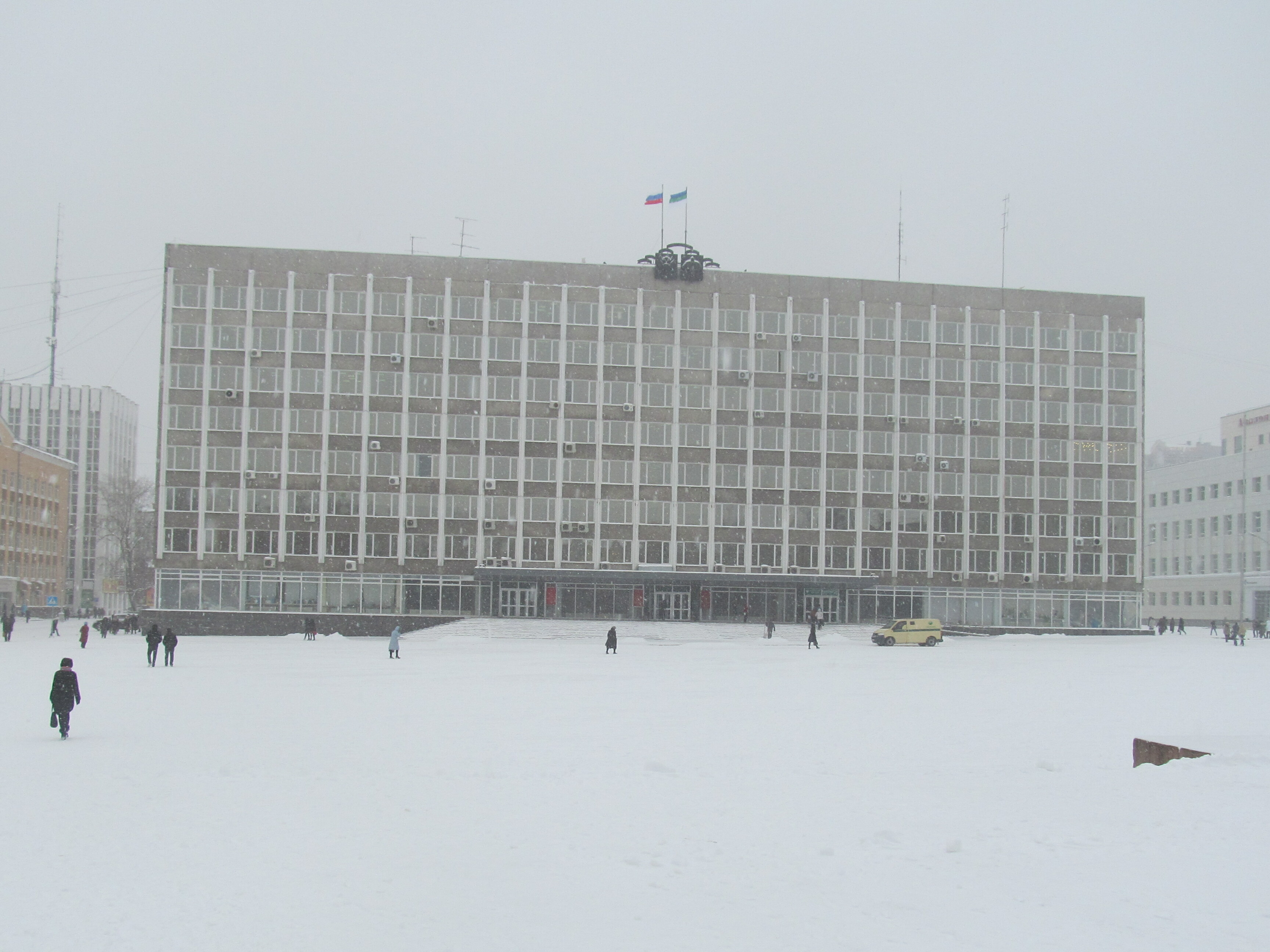
- Stefanovskaya Square, Syktyvkar

Website
- gsrk.ru

The State Council of the Komi Republic (Russian: Государственный Совет Республики Коми; Komi: Коми Республикаса Каналан Сöвет) is the regional parliament of the Komi Republic, a federal subject of Russia. It consists of 30 deputies who are elected for five-year terms.

Among the powers of the State Council is to adopt the Constitution of the Republic of Komi, adopt and/or complement and to exercise control on the Komi legislative enforcement and execution.

The presiding officer is the Chairman of the State Council of the Komi Republic.

== Elections ==
=== 2015 ===
Party	%	Seats
United Russia	58.05	26
Liberal Democratic Party of Russia	11.59	1
A Just Russia	10.02	2
Communist Party of the Russian Federation	7.40	1
Registered voters/turnout	50.93	

=== 2020 ===
Party	%	Seats
United Russia	28.61	20
Communist Party of the Russian Federation	14.81	4
Liberal Democratic Party of Russia	14.45	3
Green Alternative	10.01	1
Rodina	9.83	1
A Just Russia	8.56	1
Registered voters/turnout	30.14	

=== 2025 ===
Party	Seats	
United Russia	44.50	25
Communist Party of the Russian Federation	14.87	2
Liberal Democratic Party of Russia	14.11	1
A Just Russia	7.07	1
New People	5.96	1
Registered voters/turnout	37.56	

== List of chairpersons ==
Name	Years	Party
Vladimir Torlopov	1995–2001	Beer Lovers Party (before 1995) without party (after 1995)
Evgeny Borisov	2001–2003	United Russia
Ivan Kulakov	2003–2006	United Russia
Marina Istikhovskaya	2006–2012	United Russia
Igor Kovzel	2012–2015	United Russia
Nadezhda Dorofeeva	2015–2020	United Russia
Sergey Usachyov	2020–2025	United Russia
Alexandr Makarenko	2025–present	United Russia

== See also ==
- List of Chairmen of the State Council of the Komi Republic
