= Fiks =

Fiks may refer to:

== People with the name ==
=== Given name ===
- Fiks (singer) (born 1990), Italian singer and songwriter
- Fiks van der Merwe (1917–2005), South African rugby union player

=== Surname ===
- Lisandro Fiks (born 1971), Argentine film director, actor, playwright and musician
- Yefim Fiks (born 1946), Crimean politician
- Yevgeniy Fiks, Russian conceptual artist

== Fictional characters ==
- Director Fiks, character from the 2013 film Doraemon: Nobita's Secret Gadget Museum

== See also ==
- Fiks Fare, an Albanian TV program
- Fik (disambiguation)
- Fix (disambiguation)
