= Donske =

Donske (Ukrainian: Донське) may refer to the following places in Ukraine:

- Donske, Crimea, village in Simferopol Raion, Crimea
- Donske, Donetsk Oblast, urban-type settlement in Volnovakha Raion, Donetsk Oblast
- Donske, Odesa Oblast, village in Berezivka Raion, Odesa Oblast
