= Yevpatoria constituency =

Russian legislative constituency

Yevpatoria single-member constituency
- Constituency of the Russian State Duma
- Deputy: Leonid Babashov; United Russia
- Federal subject: Republic of Crimea
- Districts: Armyansk, Chernomorsky Dzhankoy, Dzhankoysky, Krasnogvardeysky, Krasnoperekopsk, Krasnoperekopsky, Nizhnegorsky, Pervomaysky, Razdolnensky, Saki, Saksky District, Sovetsky, Yevpatoria
- Voters: 511,794 (2026)

The Yevpatoria constituency (No.24 (Note: No.21 in 2016–2026)) is a Russian legislative constituency in the Republic of Crimea. The constituency covers northern and western Crimea.

The constituency has been represented since 2021 by United Russia deputy Leonid Babashov, former State Council of the Republic of Crimea member and entrepreneur, who won the open seat as an independent, succeeding one-term United Russia incumbent Svetlana Savchenko.

== Boundaries ==
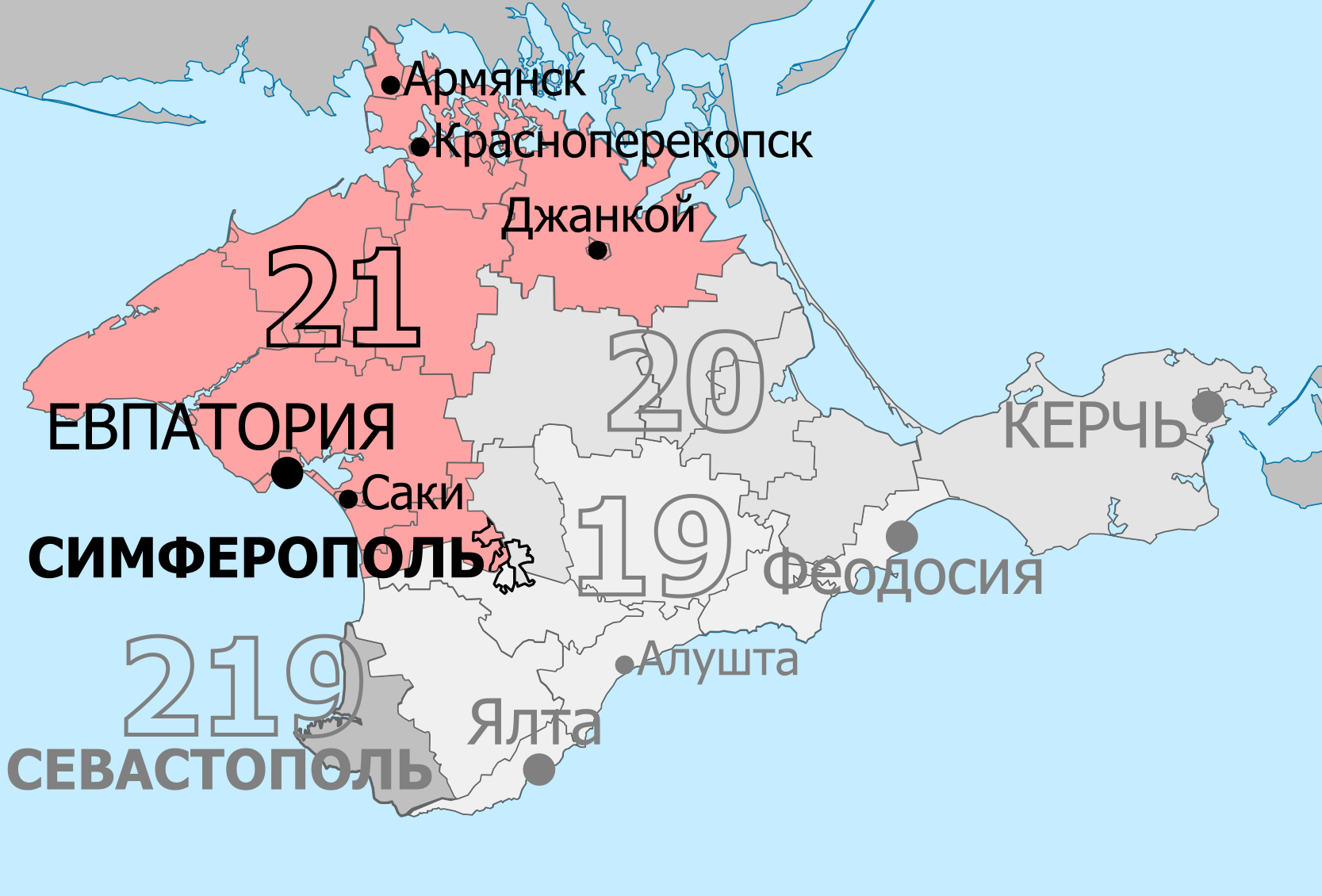
Constituency boundaries from 2016 to 2026

2016–2026: Armyansk, Chernomorsky District, Dzhankoy, Dzhankoysky District, Krasnoperekopsk, Krasnoperekopsky District, Pervomaysky District, Razdolnensky District, Saki, Saksky District, Simferopol (Zheleznodorozhny), Simferopolsky (Mirnovskoye, Nikolayevskoye, Rodnikovskoye, Shkolnenskoye, Skvortsovskoye, Ukromnovskoye, Zhuravlevskoye), Yevpatoria
The constituency was created for the first time for the 2016 election. This seat covered northern and western Crimea, including the towns of Armyansk, Dzhankoy, Krasnoperekopsk, Saki and Yevpatoria, as well as northern Simferopol.

2026–present: Armyansk, Chernomorsky District Dzhankoy, Dzhankoysky District, Krasnogvardeysky District, Krasnoperekopsk, Krasnoperekopsky District, Nizhnegorsky District, Pervomaysky District, Razdolnensky District, Saki, Saksky District, Sovetsky District, Yevpatoria
After 2025 redistricting the constituency was significantly altered, as it gained mostly rural central Crimea from Kerch constituency. Consequently, the constituency lost its part of Simferopol and its suburbs to Simferopol constituency.

== Members elected ==
Election	Member	Party
2016	Svetlana Savchenko	United Russia
2021	Leonid Babashov	Independent
2026	Leonid Babashov	United Russia

== Election results ==
=== 2016 ===
==== Declared candidates ====
- Oleg Bekker (A Just Russia), consumers' union chairman
- Vladimir Boushev (Rodina), Member of Tagansky District Council of Deputies (2012–present), marketing businessman
- Natalya Lebedeva (Party of Growth), law firm director
- Svetlana Savchenko (United Russia), Member of State Council of the Republic of Crimea (2014–present)
- Igor Siliverstov (The Greens), music producer, showman
- Pavel Shperov (LDPR), Member of State Council of the Republic of Crimea (2014–present)
- Dmitry Shuba (CPCR), perennial candidate
- Oleg Solomakhin (CPRF), former Member of Simferopol City Council (2010–2014), aide to State Duma member Nikolay Kolomeitsev
- Valery Tarasov (Patriots of Russia), rector of Crimean Institute of Business

==== Failed to qualify ====
- Marina Voronova (PRB), nonprofit chairwoman

==== Declined ====
- Alexey Chernyak (United Russia), Member of State Council of the Republic of Crimea (2014–present) (lost the primary)

==== Results ====
Summary of the 18 September 2016 Russian legislative election in the Yevpatoria constituency
Candidate	Party	Votes	%
Svetlana Savchenko	United Russia	189,624	72.10%
Pavel Shperov	Liberal Democratic Party	19,453	7.40%
Oleg Solomakhin	Communist Party	15,341	5.83%
Oleg Bekker	A Just Russia	6,948	2.64%
Natalya Lebedeva	Party of Growth	6,853	2.61%
Dmitry Shuba	Communists of Russia	5,554	2.11%
Vladimir Boushev	Rodina	3,976	1.51%
Valery Tarasov	Patriots of Russia	2,572	1.18%
Igor Siliverstov	The Greens	3,265	1.24%
Total		262,999	100%

=== 2021 ===
==== Declared candidates ====
- Sergey Alekseyev (CPCR), water dispenser
- Leonid Babashov (Independent), Member of State Council of the Republic of Crimea (2014–present)
- Viktoria Bilan (SR–ZP), former Deputy Minister of Economic Development of the Republic of Crimea (2020)
- Igor Pilipenko (RPPSS), chairman of the party regional office
- Maria Simikchi (New People), economist, Bulgarian activist
- Sergey Shuvaynikov (Rodina), former Member of State Council of the Republic of Crimea (2014–2019)
- Yury Stavitsky (The Greens), retired Russian Air Force podpolkovnik, Hero of Russia (1996)
- Oksana Taranina (CPRF), Member of Yevpatoria City Council (2019–present), party secretary
- Sergey Yerkhan (LDPR), Member of State Council of the Republic of Crimea (2019–present)

==== Failed to qualify ====
- Nikolay Yefremov (Independent), self-employed

==== Did not file ====
- Aleksandr Gorodetsky (Independent), sanatorium chief custodian
- Yevgeny Kabanov (United Russia), Deputy Premier of the Republic of Crimea (2018–present)

==== Declined ====
- Svetlana Savchenko (United Russia), incumbent Member of State Duma (2016–present)

==== Results ====
Summary of the 17-19 September 2021 Russian legislative election in the Yevpatoria constituency
Candidate	Party	Votes	%
Leonid Babashov	Independent	144,080	58.17%
Viktoria Bilan	A Just Russia — For Truth	23,678	9.56%
Sergey Alekseyev	Communists of Russia	17,046	6.88%
Oksana Taranina	Communist Party	13,753	5.55%
Sergey Yerkhan	Liberal Democratic Party	11,246	4.54%
Igor Pilipenko	Party of Pensioners	9,079	3.67%
Maria Simikchi	New People	8,648	3.49%
Sergey Shuvaynikov	Rodina	4,988	2.01%
Yury Stavitsky	The Greens	4,523	1.83%
Total		247,693	100%

=== 2026 ===
==== Declared candidates ====
- Leonid Babashov (United Russia), incumbent Member of State Duma (2021–present)
- Andrey Borovskikh (New People), Member of Molochnoye Council (2024–present), farmer
- Aleksandr Buyanov (The Greens), labor safety specialist
- Pyotr Danilin (CPCR), pawnshop owner
- Nikolay Popov (LDPR), Member of Yevpatoria City Council (2019–present), property management executive
- Pyotr Vakulenko (CPRF), agriculture businessman
- Roman Yukhnenko (A Just Russia), Member of Yevpatoria City Council (2019–present), entrepreneur

==== Results ====
Summary of the 18-20 September 2026 Russian legislative election in the Yevpatoria constituency
Candidate	Party	Votes	%
Leonid Babashov (incumbent)	United Russia	160,540	62.99%
Andrey Borovskikh	New People	21,475	8.43%
Pyotr Vakulenko	Communist Party	18,086	7.10%
Nikolay Popov	Liberal Democratic Party	16,704	6.55%
Roman Yukhnenko	A Just Russia	11,758	4.61%
Aleksandr Buyanov	The Greens	7,543	2.96%
Pyotr Danilin	Communists of Russia	8,818	3.46%
Total		254,882	100%
