= Yanina Pavlenko =

Russian politician and businesswoman (born 1976)

- Янина Павленко

Member of the State Duma for Crimea
- Incumbent
- Assumed office 10 September 2023
- Preceded by: Konstantin Bakharev
- Constituency: Kerch (No. 23) (Note: Since 2014 it has been under the de facto control of Russia, which annexed Crimea that year and regards Kerch as part of the Republic of Crimea. Ukraine still remains the de jure power, as most countries do not recognise the Russian annexation.)

Mayor of Yalta
- In office 24 December 2020 – 25 September 2026
- Preceded by: Artem Maltsev (acting)
- Succeeded by: Yurievna Svetlana (acting)

Personal details
- Born: Yanina Petrovna Pavlenko; 19 February 1976 (age 50) Vyzhnytsia, Ukrainian SSR, Soviet Union
- Party: United Russia

Yanina Petrovna Pavlenko (Russian: Янина Петровна Павленко; born on 19 February 1976) is a Russian and formerly Ukrainian politician and businesswoman who has been a member of the State Duma since 10 September 2023. Prior to this, she was the Mayor of the city of Yalta in Crimea from 2020 to 2026, and a member of the Verkhovna Rada of Crimea from 2010 to 2014, prior to the 2014 Russian annexation of Crimea. She was also a businesswoman and directed two well-known wineries in Crimea prior to entering politics: Novy Svit and the Massandra Winery.

== Early life ==
Pavlenko was born on 19 February 1976 in the city of Vyzhnytsia, which was then part of the Ukrainian SSR of the Soviet Union. Her mother, Elena Vasilievna Pavlenko, was a politician in Crimea, serving as Chairman of the Commission on Culture, Education, and Youth Affairs of the Municipal Formation of the Yalta District. She was made an honorary citizen of Yalta by decree in 2016. Her father, Pyotr Grigorievich Pavlenko, was a writer and teacher who was the longtime director of the Yalta Gymnasium named after A.P. Chekhov before he passed away in 2019. Yanina herself attended the Yalta Gymnasium named after A.P. Chekhov, graduating in 1993 with honours. After graduation, she worked part-time as a shop assistant at Tsentrotechservice in Yalta and as a teacher and organiser at the Yalta Gymnasium named after A.P. Chekhov. Meanwhile, she pursued higher education and, in 1998, graduated from Kherson State University with a specialty in the management of the non-production sphere.

Upon graduation, Pavlenko returned to Crimea and began working as an economist within the Department of Lending and Financing of Enterprises for the Yalta branch of Prominvestbank, a position she held for only a month. She then left work for a bit, only returning in early 2002 to become manager of the Kostin V.V. (Livadia winery) in Yalta, a position she held for two years. She was then promoted to marketer, then deputy director for Kostin V.V. She would later also achieve more degrees: one in 2007 from the National Academy for Public Administration (public administration), the title of Candidate of Sciences of Public Administration in 2009, from the Simferopol College of the National University of Food Technologies in 2014 (technology of fermentation, production, and winemaking), and finally one in 2019 from the V. I. Vernadsky Crimean Federal University (jurisprudence).

== Business activities ==
=== Novyi Svit ===
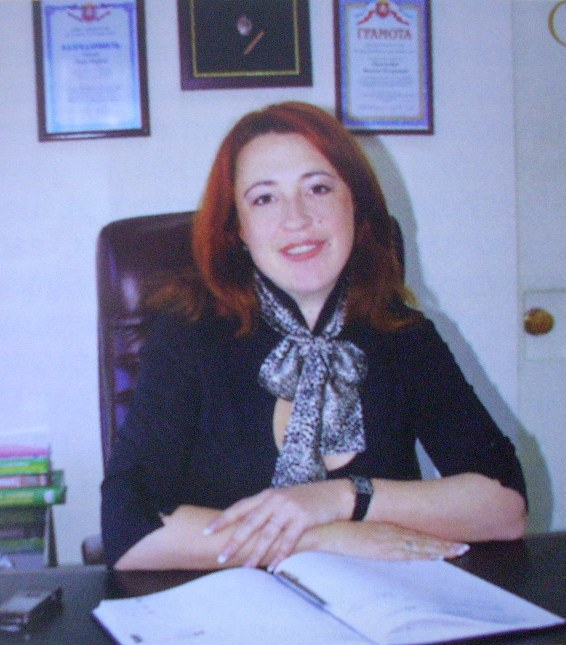
A young Pavlenko when she was director of Novy Svit.

In 2005, Pavlenko became director of the sparkling wine winery known as Novyi Svit, which was based near Sudak. After the 2014 Russian annexation of Crimea, while she was still heading it, Novyi Svit was nationalised by the State Council of the Republic of Crimea on 26 March 2014. Due to the nationalisation, Novyi Svit was put under sanctions by the European Union in July 2014. The exclusive distributor of the winery's products was then the Russian winery company Abrau-Durso.

=== Massandra ===
Pavlenko giving Vladimir Putin and Silvio Berlusconi a tour of Massandra in 2017.

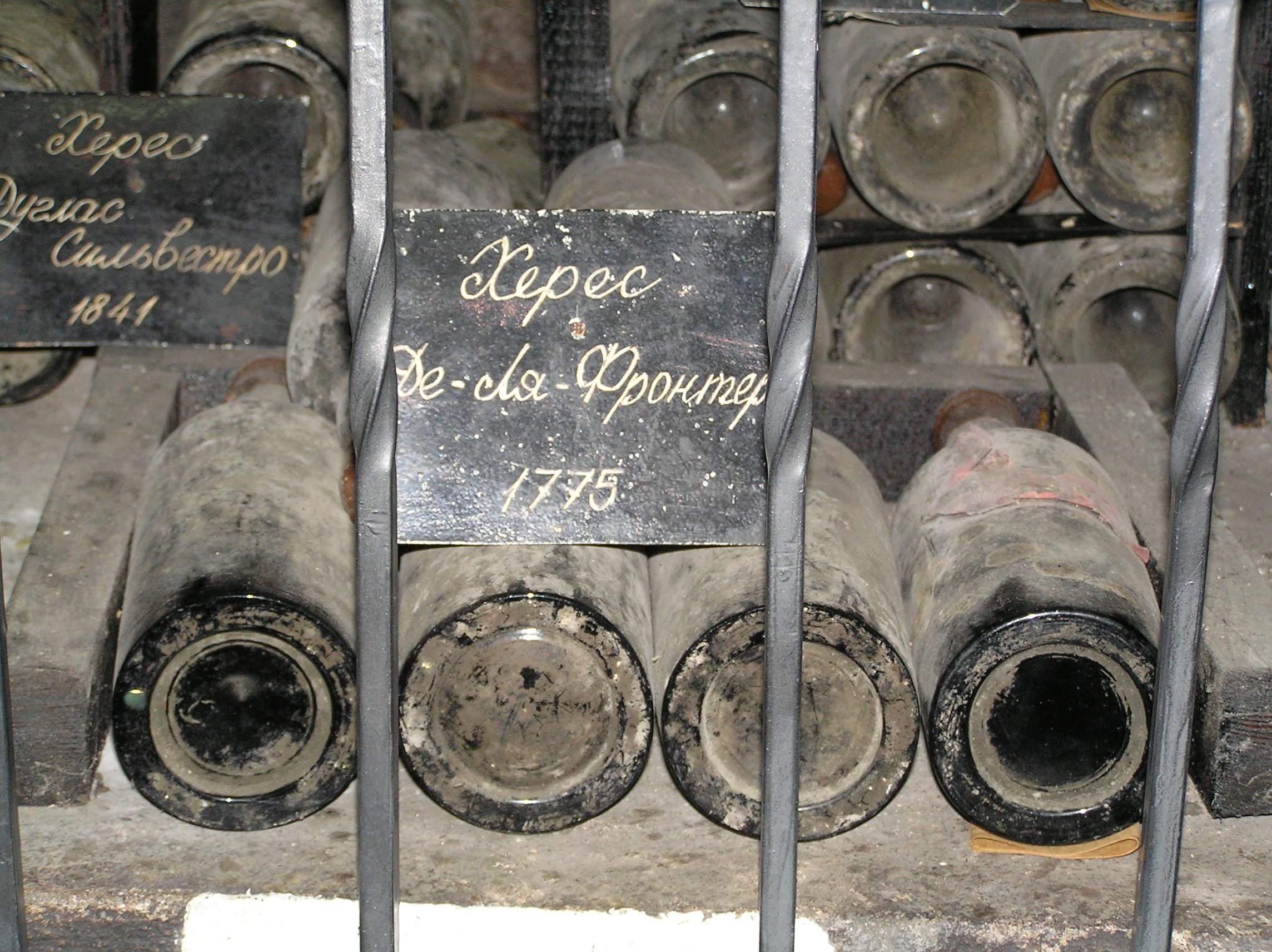
The oldest wine in Massandra, the rare 1775 Jerez de la Frontera sherry, which became the center of a dispute in 2015, and eventually led to her being charged in absentia in Ukraine.

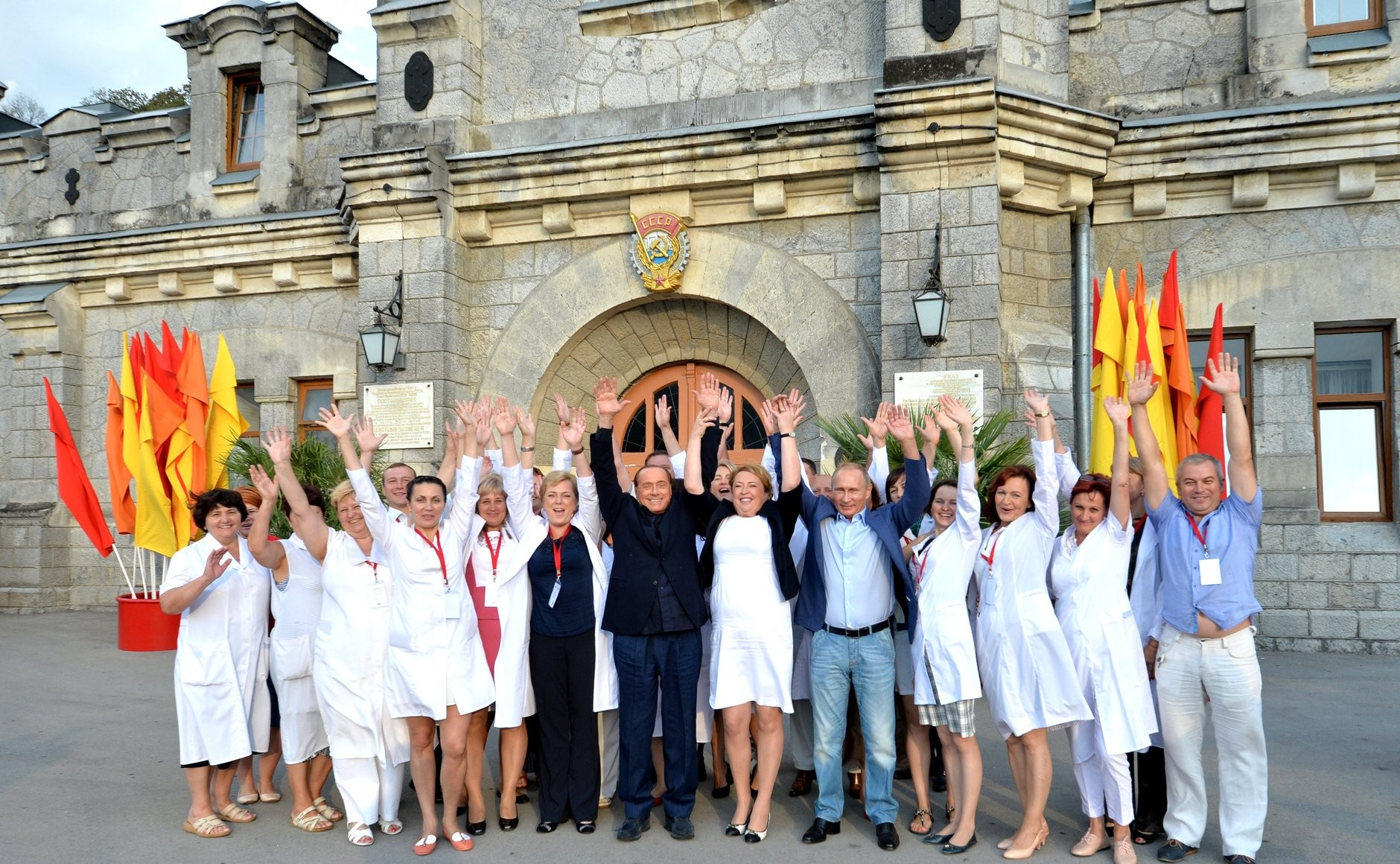
Members and workers of Massandra, including Pavlenko, in front of the winery building with Putin and Berlusconi in 2017.

In February 2015, Pavlenko was appointed the director of the historic Massandra Winery located within the settlement of Massandra, Crimea. She was appointed to succeed Mykola Boyko, who was a Hero of Ukraine (deprived in 2018) and the longtime director of Massandra up until that point, until he was dismissed by the Russian Investigative Committee for alleged abuse of power. In a piece, Forbes Russia said that the dismissal of Boyko and the appointment of Pavlenko began the "Russian" phase of the winery and the start of informational privatisation. After taking over, Pavlenko said Massandra would increase its production of dry wines and export to other countries. In 2019, while still under her directorship, an order was signed to make Massandra part of the property of the Republic of Crimea, and it was confirmed that it would be privatised. After this, Forbes Russia in an opinion piece said that although the company was making a profit, it was still selling aged wines at very low prices and that its production was outdated. At the same time, they said that she had successfully turned it towards the Russian market, although the Russian government did not seem to care to invest in it.

Shortly before she came mayor, in May 2020, the Crimean parliament officially added Massandra on its list to be privatised. It was then converted to a joint-stock company before it was sold on 14 December 2020 to "Yuzhny Proekt", which is controlled by Rossiya Bank and by extension the oligarch Yury Kovalchuk. The price Massandra was sold for was 5.3 billion rubles, which the Ukrainian government responded to by calling illegal and a war crime. In connection with this, in September 2021, her suspicion of embezzlement by thee Ukrainian government was upgraded to violations of the law and customs of war for "looting of national valuables". Pavlenko confirmed she would leave Massandra in November 2020, which she did in December.

==== 2015-2016: Visit by Putin and charges in absentia ====
In September 2015, she led Vladimir Putin and the former Italian prime Minister Silvio Berlusconi on a trip through the central cellar of the winery during their visit. During the visit, she said that the previous Ukrainian authorities under Boyko had allegedly taken out a significant portion of rare wines from the cellar, and that the Russian Investigative Committee had stopped attempts to move bottles to Ukraine after 2014. Afterwards, Brelusconi asked about drinking a two-century-old wine, to which Pavlenko opened a rare 1775 Jerez de la Frontera sherry that had been brought to Crimea during the time of Mikhail Vorontsov. This received significant media attention because Ukraine immediately filed a criminal case in absentia against Pavlenko under the de jure Crimean Prosecutor's Office. Nazar Kholodnytskyi, the then deputy prosecutor, said it was only one of five bottles to exist and was worth more than $90,000, but other reports also said up to $150,000. After the case was opened, in late October, the prosecutor's office announced suspicion of embezzlement, which would carry a sentence of up to twelve years, and if so, she would be put on the wanted list. In addition, the Centre for Journalistic Investigations (CJI) in Ukraine accused Pavlenko of selling 31 bottles of rare collection wines but later writing them off for very low prices. One example was another of the 1775 sherries, which was priced at just 44 rubles. In April 2016, the Percherskyi District Court of Kyiv authorised her detention in absentia.

==== 2015-2017: Dispute over Ukrainian-branded Massandra ====
Shortly after the Russian annexation, in January 2015, the Ministry of Agrarian Policy and Food confirmed that it would allow Massandra to be re-registered in Kyiv to keep parts of the brand Ukrainian. Months later, in December, Pavlenko said she would sue the Ukrainian state over them allowing a Ukrainian-branded Massandra to be re-registered, and said that Ukraine should not be allowed to produce branded Massandra in mainland Ukraine from Kherson Oblast. Pavlenko also claimed that Massandra was "historically Russian" and, per registers, could only be made in Crimea. In response, the United States added Massandra to its sanctions list also, which Pavlenko said had "little effect" and was an attempt to remove Crimean wineries. She also said that Massandra would re-focus on importing to China, Taiwan, and Belarus, instead of the West.

The dispute over the Ukrainian-branded Massandra and the Russian one would continue for multiple years. When Massandra attempted to sell a collection of wines from 1935 to 2005, including a 1944 white Muscat made during the war, Oleksandr Liev, the then adviser to the agrarian minister of Ukraine, said that others should not buy the wines due to sanctions and called it a "waste of Ukrainian heritage". In 2016, Pavlenko once again threatened to sue the Ukrainian Massandra, saying it was deliberately misleading customers. Eventually, the dispute ended in 2017, when Ukraine halted the Ukrainian Massandra.

== Political career ==
=== 2010-2014: Early career in Crimea ===
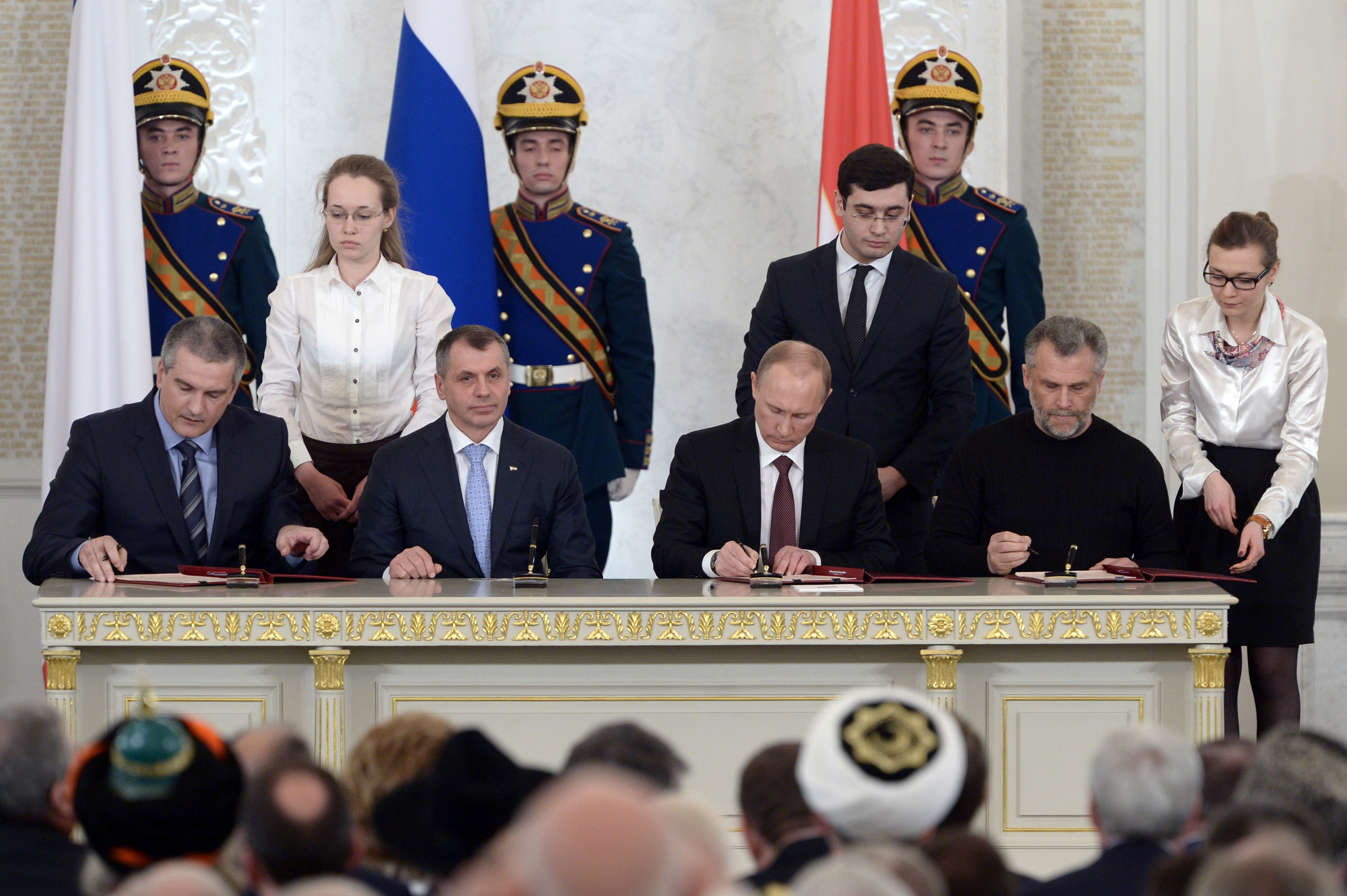
During the early days of the 2014 Russian annexation of Crimea (pictured here), Pavlenko initially opposed the annexation, and urged the speaker of Crimea not to give in to separatist actions. She, however, eventually reversed her position and voted in favour of it.

In 2010, she was elected to the Verkhovna Rada of Crimea in its sixth convocation representing the 36th constituency. Simultaneously, starting in June 2010, she became head of the Party of Regions organisation in the city of Sudak. Towards the end of her mandate, the 2014 Russian annexation of Crimea occurred. Pavlenko was rather notably hesitant at first, and in March 2014, in an open letter to Vladimir Konstantinov, she urged the Crimean speaker to prevent the adoption of "separatist actions", and said that the Constitution of Ukraine and of Crimea do not provide for Crimea to be independent or to go to Russia. She also said that the decision would end in violence and bloodshed, and said that people were already rallying near the Supreme Council of Crimea, but that the authorities did not hear them. Although insignificant at first, the statement would later be used against her by Russian nationalist outlets and people, particularly in 2020, when she was set to become Mayor of Yalta. In response, in an op-ed in the newspaper Yalta in 2020, journalist Sergey Sardyko defended her, saying she had already earned the trust of the Russian president when he visited Massandra. She later reversed her earlier statements and voted for the Russian annexation in the Verkhovna Rada of Crimea, for which she was accused of high treason by Ukraine.

After the Russian annexation, she ran for a seat in the State Council of Crimea with the Russian party Rodina. She eventually dropped out before the announcement of the elections and was thus not selected. Simultaneously, she also ran to be a deputy in the Sudak City Council with Rodina. For this election, she was initially elected successfully, and she was assigned seat No. 11 in the council from the party list of Rodina, after the party had gotten third in the elections (behind United Russia and the LDPR). However, she later refused her mandate in September 2014, but did not provide a reason why. This ended her initial political career.

=== 2020-2026: Mayor of Yalta ===
The Intercession church in Nyzhnya Oreanda in 2021. During that year, Yalta experienced a great amount of flooding, which Pavlenko called "the worst in a century."

Livadia Palace in the village of Livadia near Yalta. During her tenure as Mayor, Pavlenko tried for many years, and eventually successfully, to nationalise the Ukrainian president Volodymyr Zelenskyy's old apartment in Livadia, alongside others like Sofia Rotaru who were deemed as supporting Ukraine.

==== 2020: Appointment ====
On 20 November, she was appointed first deputy head of Yalta after the death of the previous mayor, Ivan Imgrunt. Artem Maltsev was appointed acting mayor for the time being, as he was first deputy prior to Imgrunt's death. Four days later, she was chosen to succeed Maltsev as acting Mayor of Yalta until elections could take place. During the subsequent elections, which Sergei Aksyonov asked her to take part in, four candidates were registered for the post, although two withdrew early. The election race took place on 22 December 2020, which pitted her against Mikhail Voronov, the deputy head of the legal department of Yalta. Pavlenko easily won with 73 points from the commission of the government and 5,000 from residents, against Voronov's 62 points from the commission and 665 points from residents. However, some analysts criticised her as having lacked much political or municipal experience, with others again noting her 2014 open letter. She was formally installed, though, on 24 December with 27 to 1 votes on the Yalta City Council.

==== 2020-2022: Early years in office ====
After taking office, she promised public reports for officials, the stopping of construction, and the restoration and improvement of the historical sites in the city. Another major promise was to improve the water supply due to frequent outages, such as building a seawater desalination plant, although the Deputy Prime Minister of Russia, Marat Khusnullin, was against the desalination plant and said it should only be used as a last resort. Her first major action, though, would be during the June 2021 floods, which led to a state of emergency being called in Yalta. Pavlenko then asked the Black Sea Fleet for help evacuating residents from Yalta, and she confirmed that the evacuation would begin in the more flooded downtown centre and for people near the embankments. Later, the drinking water supply was also shut off. During a subsequent interview, she said the floods "were the worst in a century", and that she had toured extensively through destroyed parts of Yalta and the nearby villages for repairs, and confirmed that one person had died. After the later Russian invasion of Ukraine, she petitioned to have the then Ukrainian president, Volodymyr Zelenskyy's former apartment be given to refugees from the Donbas. She was, however, later reprimanded in April 2022 by Sergey Aksyonov after he said she had misled the Crimean leadership with incorrect information. Subsequently, the Ukrainian Centre for National Resistance accused her of going back on her promises and demolishing the historic mansion the architect Nikolay Krasnov when he was Chief Architect of Yalta while it was waiting for its protected status.

==== 2023-2024: Nationalisation and end of first term ====
Another pro-Ukrainian project, the Association of the Reintegration of Crimea, also said, which she confirmed, that candles were being made in Yalta by children of a patriotic club for Russian troops that were deployed near Zaporizhzhia in 2023. The following year, she also confirmed that Zelenskyy's old apartment had been nationalised and sold, with the proceeds from it going to Russian troops. Pavlenko also said she would try to do the same for a hotel owned by Ukrainian singer Sofia Rotaru (she had earlier refused the annexation and refused Russian citizenship) and would also try to strip her of her honorary citizenship of Yalta. After her four-year tenure ended in October 2024, she was reappointed after a less competitive competition. After being reappointed, Pavlenko said she would join the "United Cities and Local Governments" board for Eurasia. The body is Russian-affiliated and registered in Kazan.

==== 2025-2026: Final years in office ====
In 2025, the Centre for National Resistance again accused her of the destruction of national heritage. This time, they said that in spring 2025, a plot on Polikurovsky Hill was transferred to LLC "Finist" without a public tender. Rosreestr had earlier said that construction on the plot could not happen because it was within a heritage zone, but Finist immediately began clearing it in 2026, despite Pavlenko's promises. They also said she had allowed drilling near a landslide area by the White Dacha, which was being used as a museum of Anton Chekhov. She eventually left the post on 25 September 2026 after being elected to the Duma, with the deputy head, Svetlana Shevchenko, becoming actor Mayor of Yalta in her place.

=== 2026-present: State Duma ===
In early 2026, in preparation for the upcoming 2026 Russian legislative elections, Pavlenko announced she would be vacating her post as mayor to run in the elections to the 9th State Duma. She ran with United Russia in the Kerch constituency (No. 23) after its previous deputy, Konstantin Bakharev, decided not to run again and instead unsuccessfully sought re-election on the party list. After reorganisation in 2026, the boundaries of the constituency consisting of Yalta, Kerch (its seat), Sudak, Feodosia, Alushta, and the surrounding districts. In the end, six other candidates ran against her: Alexander Baranov (REP "The Greens"), Maxim Kabanov (A Just Russia), Ivan Pavlichenko (Communists of Russia), Alexander Turov (also the Communists of Russia) Daniil Shupenya (New People), and Yuriy Yuriev (LDPR). After the first protocols were processed, it was clear she would win in a landslide, as she received 59.74% of the vote, according to the CEC, with Maxim Kabanov trailing far behind at 10.71% and Ivan Pavlichenko at 8.34%. In the end, she won 56.46% of the vote, and was thus elected to the State Duma.

== Personal life ==
She is married to a man known as Pavel, and together they have a son named Daniil. In her declarations for 2021, it was said that her husband had a high income, which she attributed to the company he owns.

== International sanctions ==
On 12 October 2026, Kuksenkova was included on the international sanctions list of the European Union for her association with the United Russia party and for participating in the 2026 elections in Crimea. She has also been included on the French sanctions register as part of her sanctions under the EU, and the national asset freezing list of Monaco in compliance with the EU since 2026. In Ukraine, she has been included on the sanction list of the country since 2015. She is also included in the Ukrainian database Myrotvorets.

== Honours and awards ==
Pavlenko has been awarded the following honours and awards:

- Medal "For Valorous Labor" (2016)
- Certificate of Honor of the Ministry of Agriculture of the Russian Federation (2018)
- Order "For Valorous Labor" (2020)

She also used to be awarded the following by Ukraine, although in 2024 Zelenskyy formally revoked all state awards of anybody that was under sanctions by Ukraine:

- Certificate of Honor of the Ministry of Agrarian Policy of Ukraine (2007)
- Honored Worker of Agriculture of Ukraine (2008)
- Gratitude of the Prime Minister of Ukraine (2010)
- Certificate of Honor of the Presidium of the Verkhovna Rada (2011)
- Certificate of Honor of the Presidium of the Verkhovna Rada (2012)
