= Andrey Kozenko =

Russian politician (born 1981)

- Андрей Козенко
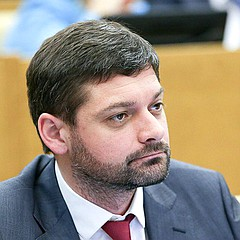

Member of the State Duma for the Crimea Simferopol constituency
- In office 5 September 2016 – 12 October 2021
- Preceded by: constituency established
- Succeeded by: Alexey Chernyak
- Constituency: Simferopol (No. 19)

Deputy Chairman of the State Council of the Republic of Crimea
- In office 30 June 2014 – 5 September 2016
- Preceded by: Grigory Ioffe
- Succeeded by: Yefim Fiks

Member of the State Council of the Republic of Crimea
- In office 19 September 2014 – 5 September 2016

Personal details
- Born: Andriy Dmytrovych Kozenko; 3 August 1981 (age 45) Simferopol, Soviet Union
- Party: United Russia; Russian Unity; Russian Bloc
- Website: http://kozenko.ru/

Andrey Dmitriyevich Kozenko (Russian: Андрей Дмитриевич Козенко; Ukrainian: Андрій Дмитрович Козенко, romanized: Andrii Dmytrovych Kozenko; born 3 August 1981) is a Russian and former Ukrainian statesman and politician. He was a deputy of the State Duma of the 7th convocation between 2016 and 2021. He was a member of the State Duma Committee on the Financial Market, and a member of the United Russia faction.

== Biography ==
Andriy Kozenko was born in Simferopol on 3 August 1981 to a working-class family. His father, Dmytro Frolovych, who had retired, worked as a forklift driver at the Simferopol furniture factory. His mother, Valentyna Stepanivna, who also had retired, worked at the Simferopol Plastics Plant.

In 1998, he graduated from the Simferopol school No. 3.

In 2000, he graduated with honors from the Crimean College of Economics and Management, and received the qualification "Economist-Jurist".

Kozenko began his career in 2001, in the Department of State Security Service at the Zheleznodorozhny District Department of Internal Affairs. In December 2001, he joined the Russian community of Crimea. He took part in the work of the campaign headquarters of candidates for deputies of all levels from the Russian community of Crimea.

In 2002, he graduated with a degree in Enterprise Economics at the Crimean Institute of Economics and Business Law. That same year, he was the initiator of the creation, and later the head of the organizing committee for the resumption of the activities of the Simferopol city organization of the Russian Youth Center of Crimea. He was elected the Chairman of the Simferopol city organization of the RCCC.

Between 2003 and 2007, he was the director of the Russian House enterprise. From 2007 to 2008, he worked at the Eco-Tourist Center in Parkovoye LLC as a Deputy Director.

In March 2003, by the resolution of the III Congress of Russian Youth of Crimea (the highest governing body of the RICC), Kozenko was elected Chairman of the Russian Youth Center of Crimea. In November 2003, he joined the Russian Bloc party. In September 2004, he was elected a member of the Board of the International Association of Youth Organizations of Russian Compatriots. He worked on a volunteer basis as an assistant to the deputy of the Supreme Council of Crimea Sergei Tsekov. He was the initiator and co-author of projects of the Russian Youth Center of Crimea, business projects of the Enterprise of the Russian Community of Crimea "Russian House".

At the 26 March 2006 elections to the Verkhovna Rada of the Autonomous Republic of Crimea, he was elected a deputy from the electoral bloc For Yanukovych!, which included representatives of the Crimean organizations of the Party of Regions and the Russian Bloc party. He was in the faction "For Yanukovych!" and was a member of the standing committees: on economic, fiscal and tax policy; science and education; on culture, youth affairs and sports; on interethnic relations and problems of deported citizens; control commission on privatization issues. He was also a member of the board of the Property Fund of the Autonomous Republic of Crimea. He was the youngest deputy of the ARC Verkhovna Rada of the V convocation from 2006 to 2010.

From 2008 to 2009, he was the director of the Russian House enterprise. From January to October 2009, he was Deputy Minister of Labor and Social Policy of the Autonomous Republic of Crimea.

In 2009, he graduated from the Tavrida National V.I. Vernadsky University with a degree in Political Science.

He was one of the founders of the Young for Russian Unity movement, and in January 2010, he was the leader of the movement.

In March 2010, he was the Deputy Chairman of the Council of Ministers of the Autonomous Republic of Crimea. In December 2010, Chairman of the Crimean Republican Organization of the political party "Russian Unity" - Deputy Chairman of this party, whose leader at that time was Sergey Aksyonov.

From March 2011 to September 2012, he was the Director of A-Profi Crimea LLC.

Between 1 October 2012 to August 2014, he was the Chairman of the executive committee of the Russian Community of Crimea.

On 25 March 2014, Kozenko received a Russian passport, stripping off his Ukrainian citizenship, and on April 7, he joined the United Russia party

That same year, he was the Deputy Chairman of the Russian Community of Crimea. Deputy Secretary of the Crimean regional branch of the United Russia party.

From September 2014 to September 2016, Kozenko was the Deputy Chairman of the State Council of the Republic of Crimea. He was the youngest vice-speaker of Crimea.

He took part in the preliminary voting of the United Russia party on the eve of the 2016 State Duma elections. He became the winner of the preliminary voting in the 19th electoral district in Crimea, gaining 95.01% of the votes on 22 May 2016.

In the elections to the State Duma of the VII convocation, held according to a mixed system, Kozenko ran in the single-mandate constituency No. 19 "Simferopol" from the United Russia party. As a result of the elections, he gained 137,938 votes (63.23%) and received the mandate of a deputy. Member of the Duma Committee on the Financial Market. On 5 October 2016, Kozenko was elected a member of parliament, a deputy of the State Duma of the VII convocation.

Between 2016 and 2019, during the term of office of a deputy of the State Duma of the VII convocation, he co-authored 24 legislative initiatives and amendments to draft federal laws.

In December 2016, he became a member of the Committee for Public Support of Residents of the South-East of Ukraine under the Federation Council.

Since June 2016, as Deputy Chairman of the Russian Community of Crimea, he is the official representative of the public movement "Donetsk Republic" in the Republic of Crimea.

Since March 2017, he became the coordinator of the Russia-Donbass Integration Committee.

=== International sanctions ===
On 9 November 2016, the European Union included Kozenko in the sanctions list. His last name is published in the official journal of the European Union. In response, Kozenko said that he was indifferent to the European Union sanctions imposed on him the day, since the parliamentarian does not have a business in Europe and does not plan to travel there.

He was sanctioned by the UK government in 2016 in relation to the Russo-Ukrainian War.

On 15 November 2016, additional sanctions against Kozenko were imposed by the US Department of Treasury. "If this is the basis for sanctions, then I would advise the clerks who remained in the Treasury until January 20 to impose sanctions on [US Assistant Secretary of State Victoria] Nuland, [billionaire George] Soros, [US Vice President Joseph] Biden," he responded.

On 17 November 2016, Kozenko was added to the Swiss sanctions list. Commenting on this decision, Kozenko urged his colleagues, as well as all Russian officials, to declare a boycott of Swiss watches, specifying that he had abandoned the products of Swiss watchmakers much earlier, "when it had not yet become a clown." "I wear watches exclusively made in Russia," he said.

On 23 November 2016, Kozenko was added to the Canadian sanctions list.

== Family ==
He is married and has a daughter.
