= Grigory Ioffe (politician) =

Russian politician (born 1953-2020)

- Григорий Иоффе
- Ioffe in 2018.

First Deputy Chairman of the State Council of the Republic of Crimea
- In office 17 March 2014 – 30 June 2014
- Preceded by: Position established
- Succeeded by: Andrey Kozenko

First Deputy Chairman of the Verkhovna Rada of Crimea (acting)
- In office 28 February 2014 – 17 March 2014
- Preceded by: Sergey Donich
- Succeeded by: Position de facto abolished

Chairman of the Public Chamber of the Republic of Crimea
- In office 30 June 2014 – 17 November 2020
- Preceded by: Position established
- Succeeded by: Alexander Formanchuk

Personal details
- Born: Grigory Adolfovich Ioffe; 3 April 1953 Simferopol, Russian SFSR, Soviet Union
- Died: November 17, 2020 (aged 67) Simferopol
- Party: Party of Regions (2000s-2014); United Russia (since 2014)

Grigory Adolfovich Ioffe (Russian: Григорий Адольфович Иоффе; Ukrainian: Григорій Адольфович Іоффе, romanized: Hryhoriy Adolfovych Ioffe; 3 April 1953-17 November 2020) was a Russian and formerly Ukrainian politician and journalist. He was formerly the First Deputy Chairman of the Verkhovna Rada of Crimea from 28 February to 17 March 2014, and then, de facto, after the 2014 Russian annexation of Crimea, the First Deputy Chairman of the State Council of the Republic of Crimea from March to June 2014. He also served as Chairman of the Public Chamber, an advisory body, for the Republic of Crimea from 2014 until his death in 2020.

== Early life ==
Ioffe was born on 3 April 1953 in the city of Simferopol, which was then part of the Russian SFSR, although a few months after his birth, it was reincorporated into the Ukrainian SSR. Ioffe was the son of Adolf Abramovich Ioffe, a participant in World War II, power engineer, and politician of the Verkhovna Rada of Crimea. His mother, Aelita Mikhailovna Tseitlin, was a neonatologist at the 1st Simferopol maternity hospital. His grandmother on his mother's side was the children's writer and journalist Vera Mikhailova.

After graduating from Simferopol School No. 40, he attended the V. I. Vernadsky Taurida National University. He graduated from the university in 1974 with a specialisation in Russian language and literature. Upon graduating, he worked as a teacher of the Russian language and literature at the Lozovskaya secondary school in Simferopol Raion until 1977, when he became an organiser of educational work and deputy director of the Dobrovskaya secondary school, also in Simferopol Raion. He remained here until 1980, when he briefly became an engineer and editor of the advertising and demand research department at PO "Foton" in Simferopol.

== Journalism career ==
In September 1981, Ioffe switched to a journalism career, becoming a correspondent at Krymsky Komsomolets. He was later promoted to head of the student youth department, then columnist for that newspaper. Simultaneously, he worked as a columnist for the newspaper Southern Courier. While he was working at Southern Courier, he alleged he was the only Crimean journalist to whom Sergei Tsekov had stripped of accreditation to the Supreme Soviet of Crimea. In February 1994, he became editor-in-chief of the newspaper Republic of Crimea, a position he held until May 2006.

== Political career ==
=== 1990s-2014: In Ukraine ===
In the 1990s, Ioffe became one of the ideologues of the regional "Party of Economic Revival of Crimea" with Alexander Formanchuk. During this time, he criticised both Yuriy Meshkov and Tsekov, although only due to incompetence, and not their views. Some of his writing in his book published in 2013, Rereading Anew, and his pieces from 1990 to 1995 have been interpreted as being hostile to the idea of Crimea joining Russia, which was a prominent viewpoint during Meshkov's era. He also called the 1991 Crimean autonomy referendum a "stillborn" product, although retroactively in 2019 he said it laid the groundwork for the annexation in 2014.

He eventually entered wider politics in 2006 after being elected to the session of the Verkhovna Rada of Crimea. During the early 2000s, he joined the Party of Regions. He was re-elected in 2010, and during that session, he chaired the Standing Commission on Mandates, Deputy Ethnics, and Organisation of Work and Media. Simultaneously, he rose through the ranks starting in 2014, becoming deputy speaker and later first deputy speaker under Anatolii Hrytsenko and then Vladimir Konstantinov. Notably, in 2012 he said there was "no politics" in the Rada's decision not to rename Simferopol Airport after the Crimean Tatar pilot Amet-khan Sultan. Ioffe said that Ukrainian regulations had already banned two airports with the same name, although some activists called the move discriminatory.

=== 2014: Russian annexation of Crimea ===
Ioffe said in a 2014 interview that he drafted nearly two dozen statements in response to Euromaidan, and that the day prior to the Russian occupation beginning, the government was already aiming at dismissing Anatolii Mohyliov as Prime Minister of Crimea regardless, and that talks with the Crimean Tatars under Refat Chubarov had allegedly failed. The day after, on 27 February Russian special forces without insignia crossed into Crimea in late February and began occupying it, including the Rada. During the session on 27 February, he denied that the session happened "under gunpoint", and said that no one voted against Mohyliov's approval, and that Sergey Aksyonov choice as the replacement prime minister was approved with Viktor Yanukovych's consent. Afterwards, he led the working group for the disputed 2014 Crimean status referendum, and chaired the constitutional commission for a new Russian Crimea, saying he had filed an application to renounce his Ukrainian citizenship. During the interim period, from 28 February to 17 March 2014, he was First Deputy Chairman of the still existing Verkhovna Rada of Crimea.

=== 2014-2020: In Russia ===
Ioffe opening a ceremony in 2019.

After the annexation on 17-18 March 2014, he was appointed First Deputy Chairman of the de facto Supreme Council of Crimea. In late March, Ioffe confirmed that the working group had drafted a Crimean constitution that would have the new Republic of Crimea have a head elected by parliament on the Russian president's and the Russian government's nomination. Ioffe later confirmed in 2019 that the Constitution of the Autonomous Republic of Crimea, adopted in 1998, was the main basis for the new constitution, and that it was agreed upon that there would be three state languages: Russian, Ukrainian, and Crimean Tatar. Rustam Minnikhanov, the then President of Tatarstan, was brought in to help also. On 7 April 2014, Ioffe was elected to the 15-member regional political council for United Russia.

On 30 June 2014, he was elected Chairman of the Public Chamber, with Formanchuk and Oleksandr Sybilev as his deputies. Konstantinov and Aksyonov had backed Ioffe as the candidate for the post. Upon being elected, he confirmed that he would suspend his United Russia membership and step down as first deputy chairman. According to a July 2014 interview shortly thereafter, he said the public chamber had the intended purpose of acting as a channel between society and the government. During a summary report in 2016 since its formation, he said the public chamber had stopped an andesite quarry near Karadag, banned unlicensed trade on Ai-Petri, and helped pass a regional animal-protection law. He said the next questions were asking Russia to include modern Crimean history in textbooks and to get Russian banks to return to Crimea, despite international sanctions. He was re-elected for a second term in 2017. Afterwards, he called the European Union "envious" in 2018 over sanctions due to the construction of the Crimean Bridge, and that same year the chamber compiled a dossier of public figures they considered "Crimea-haters". The dossier consisted mainly of figures who argued against the Russian annexation of Crimea, such as Boris Akunin, Liya Akhedzhakova, and Andrey Makarevich. He was re-elected a final time for a third term in 2020, shortly before his death. In June 2020, he defended his chairmanship of the chamber after some figures criticised the chamber for not doing much and mostly just going along with the authorities. In a reply, he said the chamber was open to criticism, but he called some of the accusations unsupported and made for hype, and that the chamber's activities regularly appeared in the media.

== Personal life ==
He was married and has a son named Denis. As of 2014, Denis has a PhD specialisationg in Silver Age poetry and worked at Ghent University in Belgium. More recently, he has worked as an Associate Professor of Russian Studies at the Université libre de Bruxelles and is co-editor-in-chief of Russian Literature.

=== Persecution in Ukraine ===
Due to his collaboration with the Republic of Crimea, in 2015, the Prosecutor's Office of the Autonomous Republic of Crimea announced that it had opened a criminal case against him and a number of other deputies for state treason under Part 1 of Article 111 and Part 3 of Article 110 of the Criminal Code of Ukraine.

=== Death ===
Ioffe died on 17 November 2020, at the age of 68. He died at the 7th City Hospital in Simferopol, which was, at the time, designated for COVID-19 patients during the COVID-19 pandemic. Formanchuk confirmed he had died of complications due to both COVID-19 and pneumonia, while another deputy said Ioffe had been ill recently and had surgery. Sergey Aksyonov released a statement calling him a "bright politician and public figure, a true professional and patriot".

== Honours and awards ==
Ioffe has been awarded the following honours:

- Order of Friendship (2014)
- Medal "For the Liberation of Crimea and Sevastopol" (2014)
- Order of the Republic of Crimea "For Loyalty to Duty" (2015)
- Honored Journalist of the Republic of Crimea (2018)
- In 2021, the annual G. A. Ioffe Prize of the State Council of the Republic of Crimea for Journalism was established
- In 2021, a memorial plaque was placed outside of his home on 20 Turgenev Street in Simferopol

Ioffe was also awarded the following honours by Ukraine. Due to his participation in the Russian-annexed Crimea, he was placed under sanctions by the state. In 2024, Ukrainian President Volodymyr Zelenskyy signed into law 4074-IX, which annulled all state awards given to individuals under sanctions:

- Honored Journalist of Ukraine (2003)
- Badge of Distinction of the Autonomous Republic of Crimea "For Loyalty to Duty" (2013)
- Order of Merit, III degree (2013)
