= Kerch constituency =

Russian legislative constituency

Kerch single-member constituency
- Constituency of the Russian State Duma
- Deputy: Yanina Pavlenko; United Russia
- Federal subject: Republic of Crimea
- Districts: Alushta, Belogorsky, Feodosia, Kerch, Kirovsky, Leninsky, Sudak, Yalta
- Voters: 490,555 (2026)

The Kerch constituency (No.23 (Note: No.20 in 2016–2026)) is a Russian legislative constituency in the Republic of Crimea. The constituency covers Black Sea coast of Crimea, stretching from Kerch to Yalta.

The constituency has been represented since 2026 by United Russia deputy Yanina Pavlenko, former Yalta mayor, who won the open seat after two-term United Russia incumbent Konstantin Bakharev unsuccessfully sought re-election on the party list.

== Boundaries ==
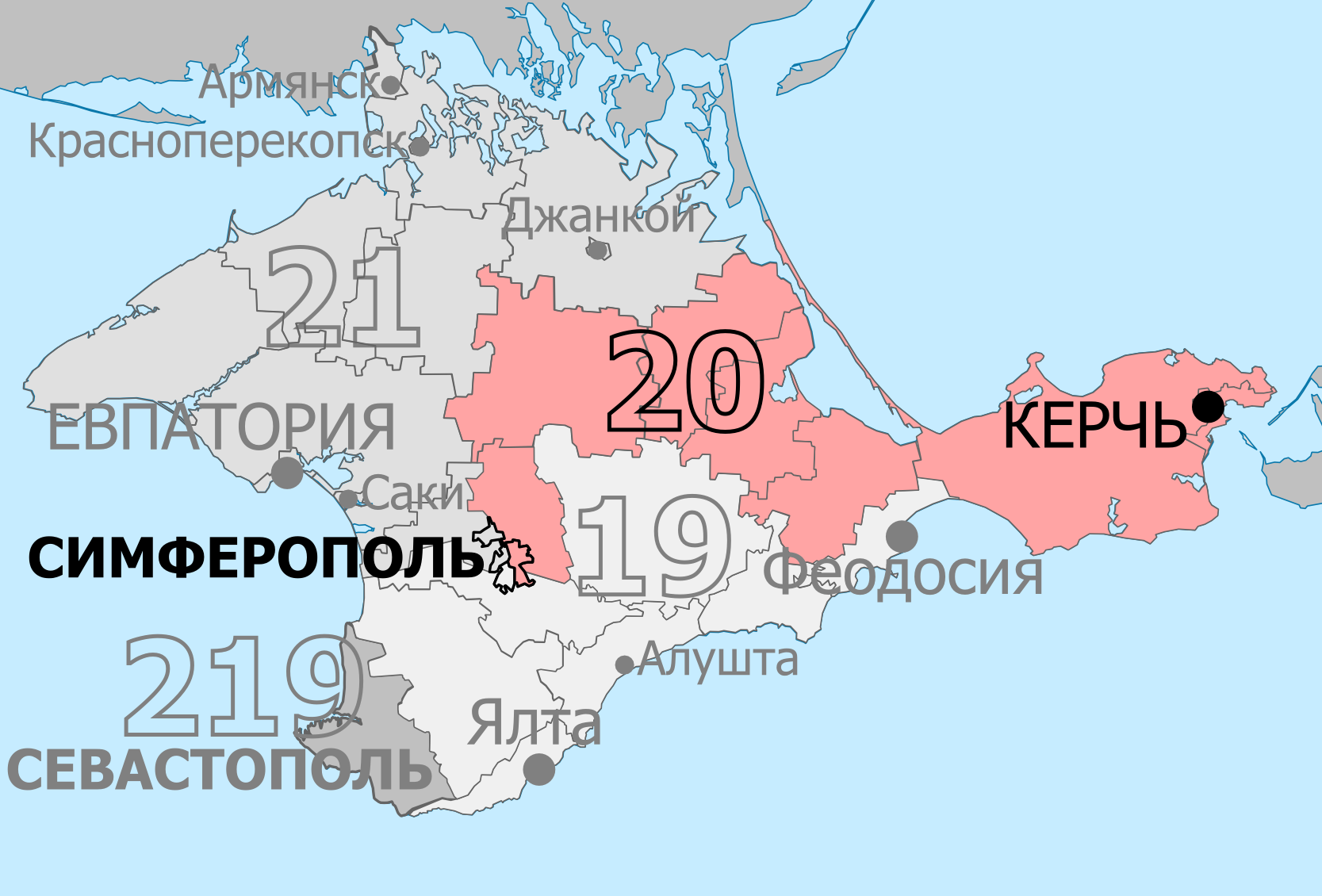
Constituency boundaries from 2016 to 2026

2016–2026: Kerch, Kirovsky District, Krasnogvardeysky District, Leninsky District, Nizhnegorsky District, Simferopol (Kievsky), Simferopolsky District (Donskoye, Gvardeyskoye, Mazanskoye, Molodezhninskoye, Novoandreyevskoye, Pervomayskoye, Shirokovskoye, Trudovskoye, Urozhaynovskoye), Sovetsky District
The constituency was created for the first time for the 2016 election. This seat covered central and western Crimea, stretching from eastern Simferopol to Kerch.

Since 2026: Alushta, Belogorsky District, Feodosia, Kerch, Kirovsky District, Leninsky District, Sudak, Yalta
After 2025 redistricting the constituency was significantly altered as it gained the entirety of the Black Sea coastal resorts (the Southern Coast of Crimea) from Simferopol constituency, stretching from Feodosia to Yalta. The constituency lost its part of Simferopol and its suburbs to Simferopol constituency, and most of central Crimea – to Yevpatoria constituency.

== Members elected ==
Election	Member	Party
2016	Konstantin Bakharev	United Russia
2021	Konstantin Bakharev	United Russia
2026	Yanina Pavlenko	United Russia

== Election results ==
=== 2016 ===
==== Declared candidates ====
- Valery Alekseyev (CPCR), electrician, perennial candidate
- Konstantin Bakharev (United Russia), First Deputy Chairman of the State Council of the Republic of Crimea (2014–present)
- Rustem Emirov (The Greens), community activist
- Igor Kiyko (LDPR), businessman
- Stepan Kiskin (CPRF), Member of Simferopol City Council (2014–present), entrepreneur
- Andrey Pasha (Rodina), former Member of Feodosia City Council (2006–2011), dance contests organizer
- Yury Pershikov (Patriots of Russia), First Deputy Minister of Information Policy, Press, and Communications of the Luhansk People's Republic (2015–present)
- Aleksandr Svistunov (Party of Growth), former Member of Supreme Council of Crimea (2006–2014)
- Mikhail Voropay (A Just Russia), party official

==== Results ====
Summary of the 18 September 2016 Russian legislative election in the Kerch constituency
Candidate	Party	Votes	%
Konstantin Bakharev	United Russia	167,896	70.46%
Igor Kiyko	Liberal Democratic Party	17,100	7.18%
Stepan Kiskin	Communist Party	12,285	5.16%
Valery Alekseyev	Communists of Russia	11,608	4.87%
Mikhail Voropay	A Just Russia	7,359	3.09%
Andrey Pasha	Rodina	6,834	2.87%
Rustem Emirov	The Greens	6,265	2.63%
Yury Pershikov	Patriots of Russia	1,238	0.52%
Aleksandr Svistunov	Party of Growth	1,199	0.50%
Total		238,271	100%

=== 2021 ===
==== Declared candidates ====
- Konstantin Bakharev (United Russia), incumbent Member of State Duma (2016–present)
- Artyom Dubovik (Rodina), journalist
- Viktor Kudryashov (CPRF), individual entrepreneur
- Vladimir Petukhov (The Greens), construction businessman
- Yekaterina Pitina (New People), teaching methodologist
- Oleg Severnenko (SR–ZP), IT businessman
- Artur Travin (RPPSS), legal counsel
- Aleksandr Turov (CPCR), individual entrepreneur
- Nikolay Volkov (LDPR), Member of State Council of the Republic of Crimea (2018–present)

==== Results ====
Summary of the 17-19 September 2021 Russian legislative election in the Kerch constituency
Candidate	Party	Votes	%
Konstantin Bakharev (incumbent)	United Russia	153,043	63.59%
Nikolay Volkov	Liberal Democratic Party	16,225	6.74%
Viktor Kudryashov	Communist Party	14,379	5.97%
Yekaterina Pitina	New People	13,697	5.69%
Oleg Severnenko	A Just Russia — For Truth	11,625	4.83%
Artur Travin	Party of Pensioners	7,135	2.96%
Aleksandr Turov	Communists of Russia	6,500	2.70%
Artyom Dubovik	Rodina	4,185	1.74%
Vladimir Pastukhov	The Greens	3,760	1.56%
Total		240,660	100%

=== 2026 ===
==== Potential candidates ====
- Aleksandr Baranov (The Greens), unemployed
- Maksim Kabanov (A Just Russia), cosmetics businessman
- Yanina Pavlenko (United Russia), Mayor of Yalta (2020–present)
- Ivan Pavlichenko (CPRF), former Member of Yalta City Council (2014–2024), aide to State Duma member Leonid Kalashnikov
- Daniil Shupenya (New People), party activist
- Aleksandr Turov (CPCR), first secretary of the party regional committee, 2021 candidate for this seat
- Yury Yuryev (LDPR), Member of State Council of the Republic of Crimea (2014–present), agricultural executive

==== Did not file ====
- Gennady Grishchuk (Independent), road worker

==== Declined ====
- Konstantin Bakharev (United Russia), incumbent Member of State Duma (2016–present) (ran on the party list)

==== Results ====
Summary of the 18-20 September 2026 Russian legislative election in the Kerch constituency
Candidate	Party	Votes	%
Yanina Pavlenko	United Russia	124,466	56.46%
Ivan Pavlichenko	Communist Party	22,183	10.06%
Maksim Kabanov	A Just Russia	16,592	7.53%
Aleksandr Turov	Communists of Russia	14,494	6.57%
Daniil Shupenya	New People	14,413	6.54%
Yury Yuryev	Liberal Democratic Party	11,913	5.40%
Aleksandr Baranov	The Greens	9,177	4.16%
Total		220,453	100%
