= Berezivka =

City in Odesa Oblast, Ukraine

Berezivka Березівка
- City
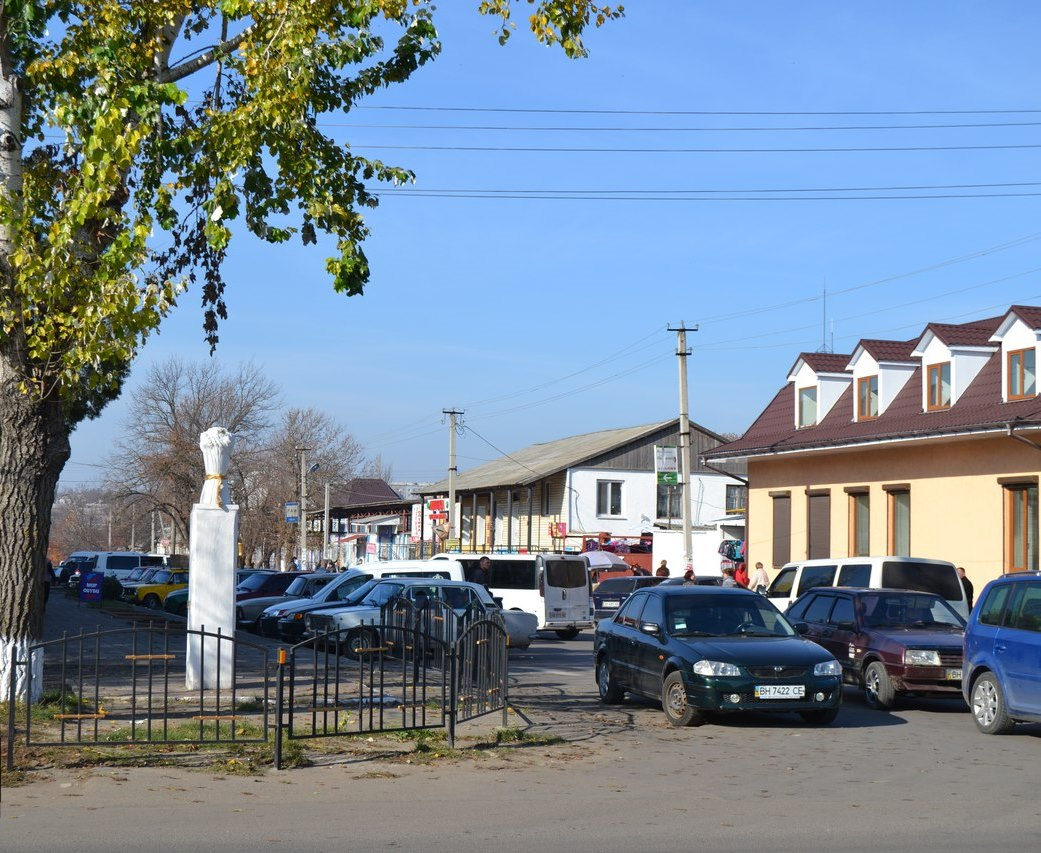

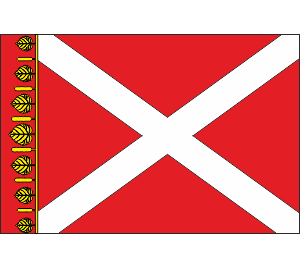
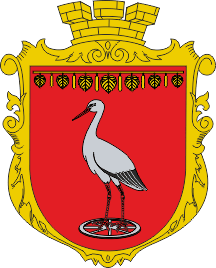
- Flag Coat of arms

- Location within Odesa Oblast Location within Ukraine
- Coordinates: 47°12′14″N 30°54′46″E
- Country: Ukraine
- Oblast: Odesa Oblast
- Raion: Berezivka Raion
- Hromada: Berezivka urban hromada
- Founded: 1802

Government
  - City Head: Valeriy Hryhorash

Area
  - Total: 34.46 km^{2} (13.31 sq mi)
- Elevation: 8 m (26 ft)

Population (2022)
  - Total: 9,428
  - Density: 273.6/km^{2} (708.6/sq mi)
- Time zone: UTC+2 (EET)
  - Summer (DST): UTC+3 (EEST)
- Postal code: 67300-67305
- Area code: +380-4856

Berezivka (Ukrainian: Березівка, pronounced [bereˈz⁽ʲ⁾iu̯kɐ]; Romanian: Berezovca) is a city and the administrative center of Berezivka Raion in Odesa Oblast, Ukraine. It hosts the administration of Berezivka urban hromada, one of the hromadas of Ukraine. In 2001, population was 9,481. Current estimated population: 9,428 (2022 estimate).

== History ==
Berezivka, as a settlement, was founded in 1802, initially as part of the village of Ananiv until it became separate when it experienced an influx of refugees from serfdom. It also started to become populated by German colonists. As the population grew, the settlement became a significant trade and industry center within the Novorossiya Governorate.

During the Ukrainian War of Independence, from 1917 to 1920, it passed between various factions. Afterwards, it was administratively part of the Odesa Governorate of Ukraine. In March 1923, it became a district center. Multiple mechanical factories, a power plant, and a plant for the repair of equipment were built within the village. During World War II, the village was occupied by the Nazi Germans from 10 August 1941 to 1 April 1944. During the occupation, most of the village's Jewish residents were killed, of whom there were thousands at the time. However, it became the center for an underground resistance against the Nazis, which was led by M. Mayboroda. In 1962, the village was given the status of a city.

== Demographics ==
According to the 2001 Ukrainian census, the town had a population of 9,347 inhabitants, which is overwhelmingly Ukrainian, while 5% are of Russian ethnicity. The exact ethnic composition was as follows:

Ethnic groups in Berezivka
	percent
Ukrainians	91.33%
Russians	4.62%
Armenians	0.50%
Moldovans	0.48%
Bulgarians	0.31%
Belarusians	0.29%

== Monuments ==
Within the city is a monument to the soldiers who died during World War II. In regard to religion, there is a temple of the UOC-MP, and communities of Baptist Christians, Jehovah's Witnesses, and Seventh-Day Adventists.
