= Simferopol constituency =

Russian legislative constituency

Simferopol single-member constituency
- Constituency of the Russian State Duma
- Deputy: Yury Nesterenko; United Russia
- Federal subject: Republic of Crimea
- Districts: Bakhchysarai, Simferopol, Simferopolsky
- Voters: 503,840 (2026)

The Simferopol constituency (No.22 (Note: No.19 in 2016–2026)) is a Russian legislative constituency in the Republic of Crimea. The constituency covers Simferopol, its suburbs and Bakhchysarai to the south-west.

The constituency has been represented since 2023 by United Russia deputy Yury Nesterenko, who replaced one-term United Russia deputy Aleksey Chernyak after his resignation in September 2022.

== Boundaries ==
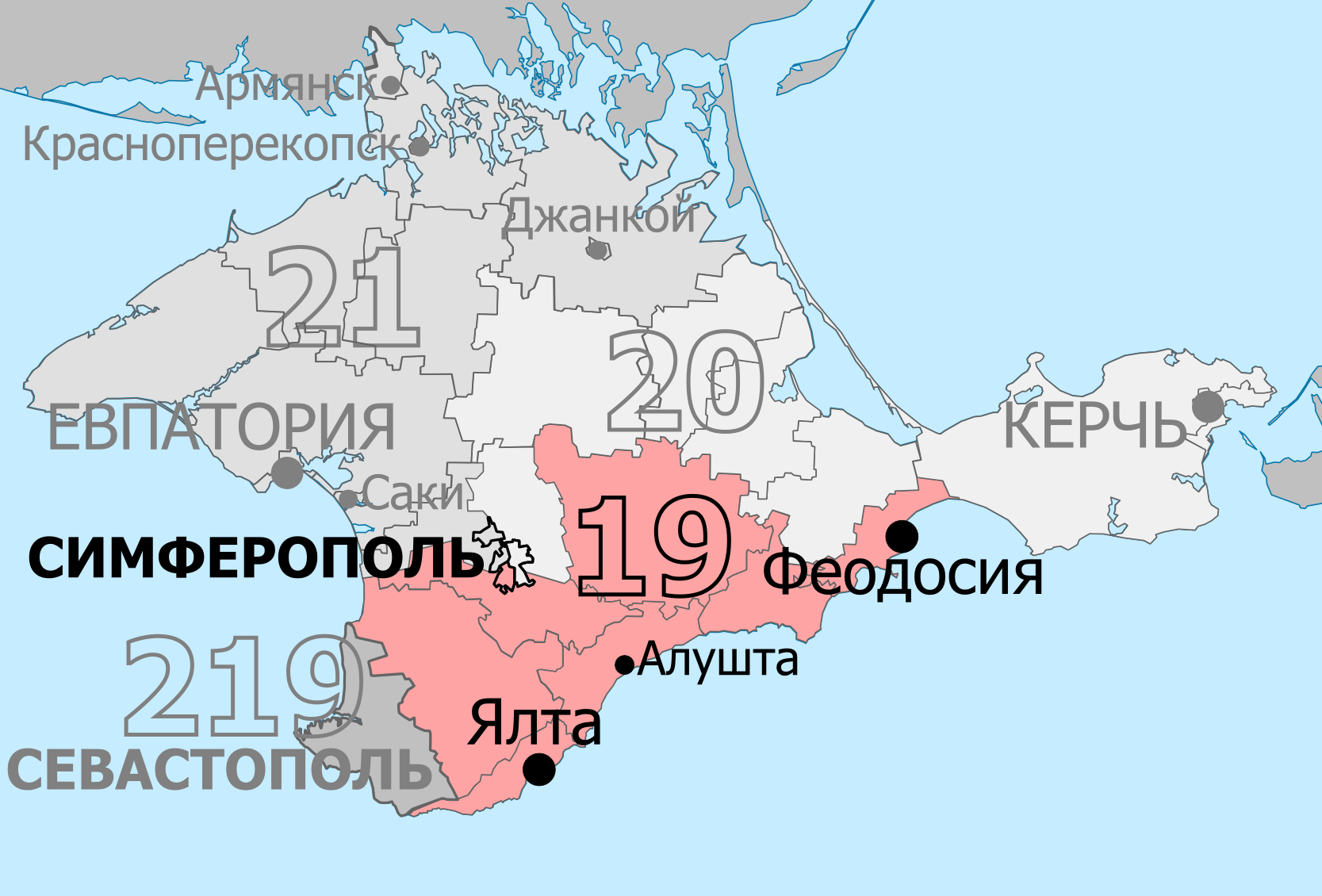
Constituency boundaries from 2016 to 2026

2016–2026: Alushta, Bakhchisaraysky District, Belogorsky District, Feodosia, Simferopol (Central), Simferopolsky District (Chistenskoye, Dobrovskoye, Kolchuginskoye, Novosyolovskyoe, Perovo, Pozharskoye), Sudak, Yalta
The constituency was created for the first time for the 2016 election. This seat covered central Simferopol, its suburbs to the south and the entirety of the Black Sea coast from Yalta to Feodosia.

2026–present: Bakhchisaraysky District, Simferopol, Simferopolsky District
After 2025 redistricting the constituency became more compact, gaining the rest of Simferopol and Simferopolsky District from Kerch and Yevpatoria constituencies. The constituency shedded Belogorsky District and the entirety of the Black Sea coast to Kerch constituency.

== Members elected ==
Election	Member	Party
2016	Andrey Kozenko	United Russia
2021	Aleksey Chernyak (Note: resigned in September 2022)	United Russia
2023	Yury Nesterenko	United Russia
2026	Yury Nesterenko	United Russia

== Election results ==
=== 2016 ===
==== Declared candidates ====
- Tair Abduvaliyev (CPCR), Member of Feodosia City Council (2014–present)
- Anatoly Azardovich (Patriots of Russia), community activist
- Aleksandr Chernyshev (CPRF), theatre actor
- Yelena Gritsak (A Just Russia), tourism businesswoman
- Nikolay Khanin (Rodina), sports club director
- Oleg Klimchuk (LDPR), corporate executive, community activist
- Andrey Kozenko (United Russia), Deputy Chairman of the State Council of the Republic of Crimea (2014–present)
- Rezeda Salikhova (The Greens), business association advisor
- Aleksandr Talipov (Party of Growth), blogger, community activist

==== Failed to qualify ====
- Sergey Akimov (Independent), unemployed
- Mustafa Arifov (Independent), pensioner
- Aleksandr Boishtyan (Independent), pensioner
- Yelena Kaverina (PRB), private kindergarten principal
- Yevgeny Marchenko (Independent), unemployed

==== Did not file ====
- Vladimir Baklan (Independent), realtor
- Vladimir Kirillov (Independent), individual entrepreneur
- Anatoly Petrov (Independent), former Minister of Housing Utilities of the Autonomous Republic of Crimea (2009), nonprofit director
- Vadim Scheferdecker (Independent), diesel locomotive driver

==== Declined ====
- Natalya Lantukh (United Russia), Member of State Council of the Republic of Crimea (2014–present) (lost the primary)

==== Results ====
Summary of the 18 September 2016 Russian legislative election in the Simferopol constituency
Candidate	Party	Votes	%
Andrey Kozenko	United Russia	137,938	63.23%
Oleg Klimchuk	Liberal Democratic Party	24,666	11.31%
Yelena Gritsak	A Just Russia	15,457	7.08%
Aleksandr Chernyshev	Communist Party	13,865	6.36%
Tair Abduvaliyev	Communists of Russia	7,770	3.56%
Nikolay Khanin	Rodina	3,070	1.41%
Rezeda Salikhova	The Greens	2,667	1.22%
Aleksandr Talipov	Party of Growth	2,599	1.19%
Anatoly Azardovich	Patriots of Russia	2,572	1.18%
Total		218,170	100%

=== 2021 ===
==== Declared candidates ====
- Emil Arpatly (Rodina), unemployed
- Aleksey Chernyak (United Russia), Member of State Council of the Republic of Crimea (2014–present)
- Andrey Kocheikhin (CPRF), Member of Yalta City Council (2019–present), businessman
- Oksana Loboda (New People), journalist
- Dmitry Nekhaychuk (SR–ZP), Plekhanov Russian University of Economics, Sevastopol branch department of management, tourism, and hospitality business acting head
- Oleg Pikhteryov (LDPR), Member of State Council of the Republic of Crimea (2021–present), aide to State Duma member Dmitry Svishchev
- Andrey Protsenko (CPCR), Member of Yalta City Council (2019–present)
- Sergey Shevtsov (RPPSS), pensioner
- Vladimir Sorokin (The Greens), nonprofit director, journalist

==== Failed to qualify ====
- Kristina Ananyeva (Independent), Member of Belogorsk City Council (2019–present)

==== Did not file ====
- Yury Frolov (Independent), unemployed

==== Declined ====
- Andrey Kozenko (United Russia), incumbent Member of State Duma (2016–present) (ran on the party list)

==== Results ====
Summary of the 17-19 September 2021 Russian legislative election in the Simferopol constituency
Candidate	Party	Votes	%
Aleksey Chernyak	United Russia	112,204	49.37%
Oksana Loboda	New People	18,396	8.09%
Dmitry Nekhaychuk	A Just Russia — For Truth	16,064	7.07%
Andrey Kocheikhin	Communist Party	16,021	7.05%
Oleg Pikhterev	Liberal Democratic Party	15,048	6.62%
Emil Artpatly	Rodina	11,119	4.89%
Sergey Shevtsov	Party of Pensioners	11,069	4.87%
Andrey Protsenko	Communists of Russia	8,820	3.88%
Vladimir Sorokin	The Greens	7,000	3.08%
Total		227,264	100%

=== 2023 ===
==== Declared candidates ====
- Dmitry Fridman (LDPR), Member of Alushta City Council (2019–present)
- Stepan Kiskin (SR–ZP), former Member of Simferopol City Council (2014–2019)
- Yury Nesterenko (United Russia), Member of Simferopol City Council (2014–present)
- Vasily Sayenko (CPRF), Member of Simferopol City Council (2019–present)
- Aleksandr Turov (Communists of Russia), pensioner

==== Declined ====
- Viktor Bout (LDPR), entrepreneur, convicted arms dealer

==== Results ====
Summary of the 8–10 September 2023 by-election in the Simferopol constituency
Candidate	Party	Votes	%
Yury Nesterenko	United Russia	97,343	68.71%
Stepan Kiskin	A Just Russia – For Truth	10,589	7.47%
Vasily Sayenko	Communist Party	10,472	7.39%
Aleksandr Turov	Communists of Russia	9,233	6.52%
Dmitry Fridman	Liberal Democratic Party	9,167	6.47%
Total		141,679	100%

=== 2026 ===
==== Declared candidates ====
- Sergey Ageyev (The Greens), businessman
- Gennady Kovalenko (CPRF), former Member of Perovo Rural Council (2019–2024), air traffic controller
- Yury Nesterenko (United Russia), incumbent Member of State Duma (2023–present)
- Nikolay Novikov (A Just Russia), individual entrepreneur
- Olga Panova (New People), construction executive
- Svetlana Shabelnikova (LDPR), Member of State Council of the Republic of Crimea (2014–present), businesswoman
- Andrey Shekun (CPCR), unemployed
- Dmitry Vasilikhin (Rodina), sales representative

==== Declined ====
- Igor Taranenko (CPRF), Member of Krasnoperekopsk City Council (2024–present), party secretary

==== Results ====
Summary of the 18-20 September 2026 Russian legislative election in the Simferopol constituency
Candidate	Party	Votes	%
Yury Nesterenko (incumbent)	United Russia	136,625	54.99%
Gennady Kovalenko	Communist Party	27,161	10.93%
Sergey Ageyev	The Greens	21,044	8.47%
Olga Panova	New People	18,379	7.40%
Nikolay Novikov	A Just Russia	14,671	5.90%
Svetlana Shabelnikova	Liberal Democratic Party	13,436	5.41%
Andrey Shekun	Communists of Russia	5,947	2.39%
Dmitry Vasilikhin	Rodina	5,125	2.06%
Total		248,470	100%
