= Tanivka =

Village in Odesa Oblast, Ukraine

Tanivka Танівка
- Village
- Location within Odesa Oblast Location within Ukraine
- Coordinates: 47°03′17″N 30°57′52″E
- Country: Ukraine
- Oblast: Odesa Oblast
- Raion: Berezivka Raion
- Hromada: Berezivka urban hromada

Population (2001)
  - Total: 135
- Time zone: UTC+2 (EET (Kyiv))
  - Summer (DST): UTC+3 (EEST)

Tanivka (Ukrainian: Танівка), formerly known as Vovkove, is a village in Berezivka Raion of Odesa Oblast in Ukraine. It belongs to Berezivka urban hromada, one of the hromadas of Ukraine.

== Demographics ==
According to the 1989 census, the population of Tanivka was 173 people, of whom 86 were men and 87 women.

Native language as of the Ukrainian Census of 2001:

- Ukrainian 97.78%
- Russian 2.22%
