= Berezivka urban hromada =

Coordinates: 47°12′14″N 30°54′45″E

Berezivka urban hromada Березівська міська громада
- Hromada
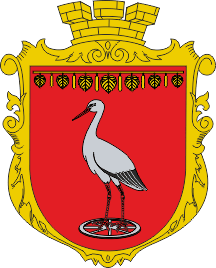
- Coat of arms
- Interactive map of Berezivka urban hromada
- Country: Ukraine
- Oblast: Odesa Oblast
- Raion: Berezivka Raion
- Admin. center: Berezivka

Area
  - Total: 684.7 km^{2} (264.4 sq mi)

Population (2020)
  - Total: 16,659
  - Density: 24.33/km^{2} (63.02/sq mi)
- CATOTTG code: UA51020030000095942
- Settlements: 27
- Cities: 1
- Villages: 26

Berezivka urban hromada (Ukrainian: Березівська міська громада) is a hromada in Berezivka Raion of Odesa Oblast in southwestern Ukraine. It has a population of 16,659 (2020 est.)

The hromada consists of a city of Berezivka and 26 villages:

- Veselynivka
- Viktorivka
- Huliaivka
- Demydove
- Donska Balka
- Donske
- Zlatoustove
- Karnahorove
- Kosivka
- Kotovka
- Kudriavka
- Lanove
- Marianivka
- Mykhailivka
- Mykhailo-Oleksandrivka
- Novohryhorivka
- Odradna Balka
- Rozdol
- Sakharove
- Sofiivka
- Stepanivka
- Tanivka
- Chervone
- Chornohirka
- Yurkove
- Yasnopillia

== Links ==
- Berezivka urban hromada // Облікова картка на офіційному вебсайті Верховної Ради України.
- Березівська міська ОТГ // Облікова картка на офіційному вебсайті Верховної Ради України.
- Децентралізація влади: Березівська сільська громада
- gromada.info: Березівська об’єднана територіальна громада
- http://atu.minregion.gov.ua/ua/ustriy_page/1663174109602776101
