= Leonid Babashov =

Russian politician

- Леонид Бабашов
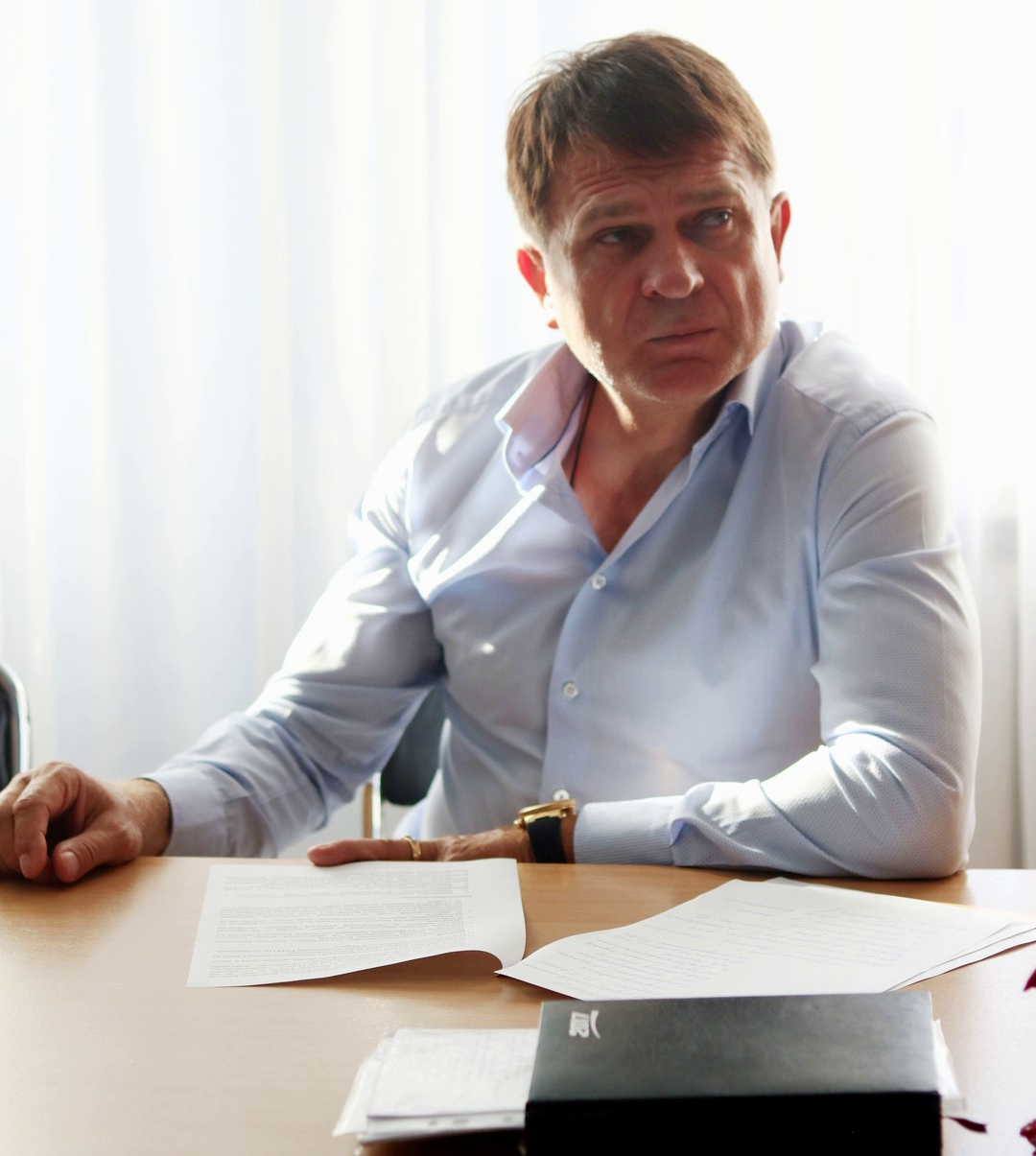
- Babashov in 2018

Member of the State Duma for Crimea
- Incumbent
- Assumed office 12 October 2021
- Preceded by: Svetlana Savchenko
- Constituency: Yevpatoria (No. 21)

Personal details
- Born: 31 January 1966 (age 60) Petrivka, Krasnohvardiiske Raion, Ukrainian SSR, USSR
- Party: Independent; United Russia
- Education: Kyiv Civil Engineering Institute

Leonid Ivanovich Babashov (Russian: Леонид Иванович Бабашов; born 31 January 1966, Petrovka, Krasnohvardiiske Raion, Crimea) is a Russian political figure, deputy of the 8th State Duma convocation. After graduating from the Kyiv Civil Engineering Institute in 1995; he started working as an entrepreneur. From 2014 to 2021, he was a deputy of the State Council of Crimea of the 1st and 2nd convocations.

Since September 2021, he has served as a deputy of the 8th State Duma convocation. Despite being a member of the United Russia, he ran as an independent candidate from the Republic of Crimea constituency.

== Family ==
Babashov has been married twice. His first wife died, and he had two children from his first marriage. Then he married Tatiana, with whom he had a daughter.
