= Yury Nesterenko (politician) =

- Юрий Нестеренко
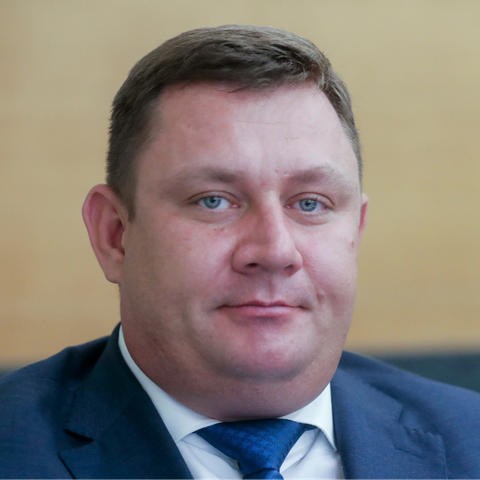

Member of the State Duma for Crimea
- Incumbent
- Assumed office 10 September 2023
- Preceded by: Alexey Chernyak
- Constituency: Simferopol (No. 19)

Member of the Simferopol City Council
- In office 2014 – 10 September 2023

Personal details
- Born: Yury Yuryevich Nesterenko; 24 March 1981 (age 45) Kirovohrad, UkSSR, USSR
- Party: United Russia

Yury Yuryevich Nesterenko (Russian: Юрий Юрьевич Нестеренко; born on 24 March 1981) is a Ukrainian-born Russian politician who is currently a member of the State Duma since 10 September 2023.

He was elected in the by-elections to the 8th Russian State Duma on September 10, 2023, in the Simferopol single-mandate constituency. A member of the United Russia party, he was a member of the Simferopol City Council from 2014 to 2023.

== Biography ==
Yuri Nesterenko was born in 1981 in Kirovohrad.

He and his family later moved to Crimea.

In 1997, Nesterenko graduated from school in Simferopol.

In 2002, he graduated from the Taurida National University with a degree in jurisprudence.

In 2009, he attended the National University of the State Tax Service of Ukraine with a degree in finance.

In 2014, he sat on the Simferopol City Council as part of the United Russia faction.

In 2016, he graduated from the Russian Academy of National Economy and Public Administration under the President of the Russia for direction "State and municipal management".

He worked at the Mebel company, where he worked his way up from a lawyer to the general director and chairman of the board, and in 2016 he became an individual entrepreneur.

He was re-elected in 2019, and was the head the social policy committee.

In 2023, Nesterenko nominated a candidacy for the State Duma of the VIII convocation in by-elections in the Simferopol single-mandate constituency, as the mandate became vacant after deputy Alexey Chernyak resigned. According to the voting results, Nesterenko took first place.

== Family ==
It is known that Nesterenko is married and has two children.
