= Svetlana Savchenko =

Russian and former Ukrainian politician

- Светлана Савченко
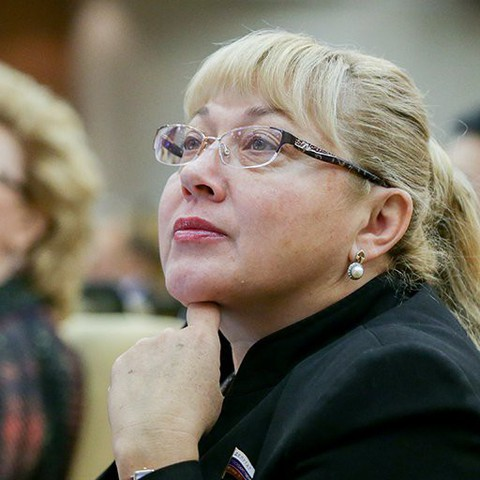

Member of the State Duma from Crimea
- In office 5 October 2016 – 12 October 2021
- Preceded by: constituency established
- Succeeded by: Leonid Babashov
- Constituency: Yevpatoria (No. 21)

Member of the State Council of the Republic of Crimea
- In office 14 September 2014 – 5 October 2016

Personal details
- Born: Svitlana Borysivna Savchenko; 24 June 1965 (age 61) Bilohirsk, Crimea, Ukrainian SSR, USSR
- Party: United Russia

Svetlana Borisovna Savchenko (Russian: Светлана Борисовна Савченко; Ukrainian: Світлана Борисівна Савченко, romanized: Svitlana Borysivna Savchenko; born 24 June 1965) is a Russian and former Ukrainian politician who is a former member of parliament of the State Duma of the VII convocation, as a member of the State Duma Committee on Culture from 5 October 2016 to 12 October 2021.

In the past, she was a Chairman of the Standing Committee of the State Council of Crimea on Culture. She was a Chairman of the Committee of the State Council of the Republic of Crimea on Culture and Protection of Cultural Heritage, as a member of the State Council of the Republic of Crimea, from 14 September 2014 and 5 October 2016.

== Biography ==
Svetlana Savchenko was born on 24 June 1965, in the city of Belohorsk, Crimea.

Savchenko began her career in 1982, as a senior pioneer leader at Belogorsk secondary school No. 1.

From 1983 to 1988, she was a student of the Simferopol State University named after I.I. M. V. Frunze.

In 1988, she graduated from the Simferopol State University. MV Frunze, specializing in history, and was a teacher of history and social science.

From 1988 to 1989, she was an executive secretary of the Board of the Belogorsk Organization of the Knowledge Society of the Crimean Regional Knowledge Organization.

From 1989 to 1993, Savchenko worked as a history teacher at the Chernopil secondary school in the Belogorsk region.

From 1993 to 1994, she worked as the head of the social protection department of the Crimean Republican Union of Afghanistan Veterans in Simferopol.

=== Political activity ===
From 1994 to 1998, Savchenko was elected a member of the Supreme Soviet of Crimea on a professional basis from the Russia bloc headed by Yuriy Meshkov.

From 1999 to 2002, she was the chairman of the Soyuz party. From 2002 to 2006, Savchenko worked as an assistant-consultant to the People's Deputy of Ukraine Lev Mirimsky.

From 2006 to 2010, she became the chairman of the standing commission of the Supreme Council of the Autonomous Republic of Crimea on social issues, health care and veterans affairs. Since 2011, Savchenko was appointed deputy chairman of the Crimean republican organization of the Union party.

In March 2014, she was the chairman of the standing committee of the State Council of the Republic of Crimea on culture.

From 14 September 2014 to 5 October 2016 she was the chairman of the Committee of the State Council of the Republic of Crimea on culture and issues of protection of cultural heritage.

In the elections on 18 September 2016, Savchenko was elected a member of parliament, a deputy of the State Duma of the VII convocation. In the State Duma, she is a member of the United Russia faction. Member of the State Duma Committee on Culture.

=== Sanctions ===
She was sanctioned by the UK government in 2016 in relation to the Russo-Ukrainian War.

The prosecutor's office of the ARC (Ukraine), suspected Savchenko of high treason, in connection with which she is put on the wanted list.

==== Legislative activity ====
From 2016 to 2019, during her term of office as a deputy of the State Duma of the VII convocation, she co-authored 35 legislative initiatives and amendments to draft federal laws.
