= Odradna Balka =

Rural locality in Odesa Oblast, Ukraine

Odradna Balka Одрадна Балка
- Location within Odesa Oblast Location within Ukraine
- Country: Ukraine
- Oblast: Odesa Oblast
- Raion: Berezivka Raion
- Hromada: Berezivka urban hromada
- Time zone: UTC+2 (EET (Kyiv))
  - Summer (DST): UTC+3 (EEST)

Odradna Balka (Ukrainian: Одрадна Балка) is a village located in Berezivka Raion in Odesa Oblast in Ukraine. It belongs to Berezivka urban hromada, one of the hromadas of Ukraine. The village has a population of 25 people. According to the 2001 census, the majority of the population of Odradna Balka was Ukrainian -speaking (84%), with Romanian (12%) and Russian (4%) speakers in the minority.

== History ==
During World War II, 200 Jews from Odesa were brought in the village and kept in two barns. On March 15–16, 1942, they were all murdered by ethnic German militia from Tartakai.

== See also ==
- 1941 Odessa massacre
- List of massacres in Ukraine
