= Vera Mikhailova =

Soviet children's writer and journalist (1907–1985)

- Born: 4 September 1907; Nerchinsk, Russian Empire
- Died: 30 May 1985 (aged 77); Simferopol, Crimean Oblast, Soviet Union
- Occupations: Children's book author; journalist

Vera Grigorovna Mikhailova (Russian: Вера Григорьевна Михайлова, romanized: Vira Grigorivna Mykhaylova; 4 September 1907 – 30 May 1985) was a Soviet children's writer and journalist.

== Early life and education ==
Vera Grigorovna Mikhailova was born on 4 September 1907, in Nerchinsk prison in Nerchinsk (Transbaikal), Russian Empire. Her parents, members of the Tomsk underground organization, were imprisoned. According to other sources, she was born on August 22, 1908, in Mariinsk (now Kemerovo Oblast).

She worked at a factory from the age of 12. At the age of 14 she joined the Komsomol in Chita and was sent to work in the newly created Komsomol newspaper Yunaya Rat. She graduated in 1941 from the Leningrad State Institute of Journalism, then studied for three years at the Crimean Pedagogical Institute in Simferopol.

== Career ==
Mikhailova lived and worked in Ukraine. She was a member of the Communist Party of the Soviet Union. Mikhailova worked in newspaper editorial offices, during and after World War II. From 1950 to 1960 she was the editor-in-chief of the Simferopol district newspaper Pryzyv (until 1952 the newspaper was called Bolshevik Truth, and is now called Selsky Truzhenik Kryma). She headed the prose section of the Crimean branch of the Union of Soviet Writers.

She wrote in Russian. Most of her works were written for children. Mikhailova is the author of the collections of short stories "Vorobeich" (1956), "Signal" (1958) and "How Dimka Became Bimkoy" (1963), the stories "Alay Lenta" (1960), "Zhil v Uzine malchishka" (1967, about the childhood of cosmonaut Pavel Popovich ), "Goshka - Partisan Son" (1971). All her books were published in Simferopol. The story "Goshka - Partisan Son" was translated into Tajik.

She died on May 30, 1985 in Simferopol, Crimean Oblast, USSR (now Autonomous Republic of Crimea).

Her grandson, Grigory Adolfovich Iofe (1953–2020), was a Crimean politician, and the first deputy chairman of the Supreme Council of Crimea and Chairman of the Public Chamber of the Republic of Crimea.

== Works ==
- Алая лента [Alaya Lenta]. Simferopol: Krymizdat. 1960.
- Жил в Узине мальчишка [Zhil v Uzyne malchishka]. Simferopol. 1967.; about the childhood of Ukrainian cosmonaut Pavel Popovich
- Гошка — партизанский сын [Goshka — The Partisan's Son]. Simferopol: Tavriya. 1971.
