= Donske, Odesa Oblast =

Donske Донське
- Village
- Location in Odesa Oblast Location in Ukraine
- Coordinates: 47°07′12″N 30°55′00″E
- Country: Ukraine
- Oblast: Odesa Oblast
- Raion: Berezivka Raion
- Hromada: Berezivka urban hromada
- Elevation: 112 ft (34 m)

Population (2001)
  - Total: 124
- Time zone: UTC+2 (EET)
  - Summer (DST): UTC+3 (EEST)

Donske (Ukrainian: Донське) is a village in Berezivka Raion, Odesa Oblast, Ukraine. It belongs to Berezivka urban hromada, one of the hromadas of Ukraine.

== Demographics ==
According to the 1989 census, the population of Donske was 130 people, of whom 67 were men and 63 were women. According to the 2001 census, 124 people lived in the village.

Native language as of the Ukrainian Census of 2001:

Language	Percentage
Ukrainian	96.77 %
Russian	0.81 %
Belarusian	0.81 %
Moldovan (Romanian)	0.81 %
German	0.81 %
