= Fiks van der Merwe =

South African rugby union player (1911–2005)

- Full name: Barend Stephanus van der Merwe
- Born: 2 January 1917 Cradock, South Africa
- Died: 11 July 2005 (aged 88) Pretoria, South Africa

Rugby union career
- Position: Flanker
Provincial / State sides
Years	Team	Apps	(Points)
- Natal
- Northern Transvaal
International career
Years	Team	Apps	(Points)
1949	South Africa	1	(0)

Barend Stephanus "Fiks" van der Merwe (2 January 1917 – 11 July 2005) was a South African international rugby union player.

Raised on a farm in Cradock district, van der Merwe started his career with local side Cradock Rovers and after leaving school became a police officer in Maritzburg. He played rugby for Maritzburg Police and was capped for Natal as a scrum–half, although he later moved into the pack. A tireless player, van der Merwe was known by the nickname "Fiks" (the Afrikaans word for "fit").

During World War II, van der Merwe served in North Africa with the Police Brigade and became a German prisoner of war. He was held for a period of time at the same camp as his future Springboks teammate Okey Geffin, as well as ex–Springbok Bill Payn. At the Stalag IV-B prisoner camp, van der Merwe captained a "Springboks" team to victory over a combined side from the British Isles. He was liberated by Russians soldiers at the end of the war.

Post war, van der Merwe captained Northern Transvaal and gained a Springboks cap as a wing–forward against the All Blacks at Newlands in 1949. He continued playing until being forced into retirement in 1952 with an ankle injury.

== See also ==
- List of South Africa national rugby union players
