= Yevgeniy Fiks =

American painter

- Yevgeniy Fiks leads a group tour in Moscow for his project entitled, American Communists in Moscow: Walking Tour. during the 3rd Moscow Bienniale of Contemporary Art.
- Born: 1972 (age 53–54); Moscow, Russia
- Known for: conceptual artist, Painting, Drawing, Mixed Media, Performance Art
- Website: www.yevgeniyfiks.com

Yevgeniy Fiks is a multidisciplinary, Post-Soviet conceptual artist. His medium includes painting, drawing, performance, and book arts. He was born in Moscow, Union of Soviet Socialist Republics (USSR) in 1972 and has been living and working in New York City since 1994.

Fiks defines "the Post-Soviet artist" as one who has the responsibility to raise the proper understanding and critical reflection of Soviet history in order for Post-Soviet societies to move forward. His works explore the dialectic between Communism and "the West" and are based on historical research, usually of forgotten and unresolved Cold War narratives. Some of these topics include the shared histories of the Red and Lavender Scares during the McCarthy era; Communism in Modern Art; and African, African-American, and Jewish Diasporas in the Soviet Union.

Fiks has exhibited internationally, including at the Museum of Modern Art, MassMoCA, the Philadelphia Museum of Art, the Moscow Museum of Modern Art, and Museu Colecção Berardo in Lisbon. His work has been included in the Moscow Biennale of Contemporary Art, Biennale of Sydney and Thessaloniki Biennale of Contemporary Art.

== Education ==
Fiks was trained as a Socialist Realist painter at the Art College in Memory of 1905 Revolution and V. I. Surikov Art Institute, both in Moscow. Fiks has a Bachelors in Fine Arts from Brooklyn College and a Masters in Fine Arts from The School of Visual Arts.

== Artwork ==
Song of Russia no. 15
- Artist: Yevgeniy Fiks
- Year: 2007
- Medium: Oil on canvas
- Dimensions: 91 cm × 120 cm (36 in × 48 in)

Fiks' work in the mid 2000s focused on the critical connections between Soviet and American communist histories. In his series, Song of Russia (2005-2007), he painted scenes from Hollywood movies produced between 1943 and 1944 depicting Russian life. His paintings showcased the most socialist realist imagery from Metro-Goldwyn-Mayer films Song of Russia and North Star and Warner Brothers film Mission to Moscow, under the notion that these movies were made at the behest of President Franklin D. Roosevelt to promote Soviet-American relations during World War II.

In Lenin for Your Library (2005-2006), Fiks donated a copy of V.I. Lenin's book, Imperialism: The Highest Stage of Capitalism, to 100 major transnational corporations around the world including, Gap, Inc., Coca-Cola, General Electric, and IBM. Fiks received 35 response letters with 14 companies accepting the donation. The resulting response letters of rejection and acceptance compiled the art installation, which has been shown worldwide. The project questions the contemporary mentality of corporations as "entities" and the fate of Lenin's critique of imperialism today. This project has also been compiled into a book with the same title.

In Communist Guide to New York City (2008), Fiks photographed buildings and public places in New York City connected to the history of the American Communist movement. This includes the contemporary offices of CPUSA on West 23rd Street, John Reed's house in Greenwich Village, and W.E.B. Du Bois' apartment in Harlem. This project came in many forms, including installations, a walking tour of New York City, and a guidebook.

Homosexuality is Stalin's Atom Bomb to Destroy America, 2012
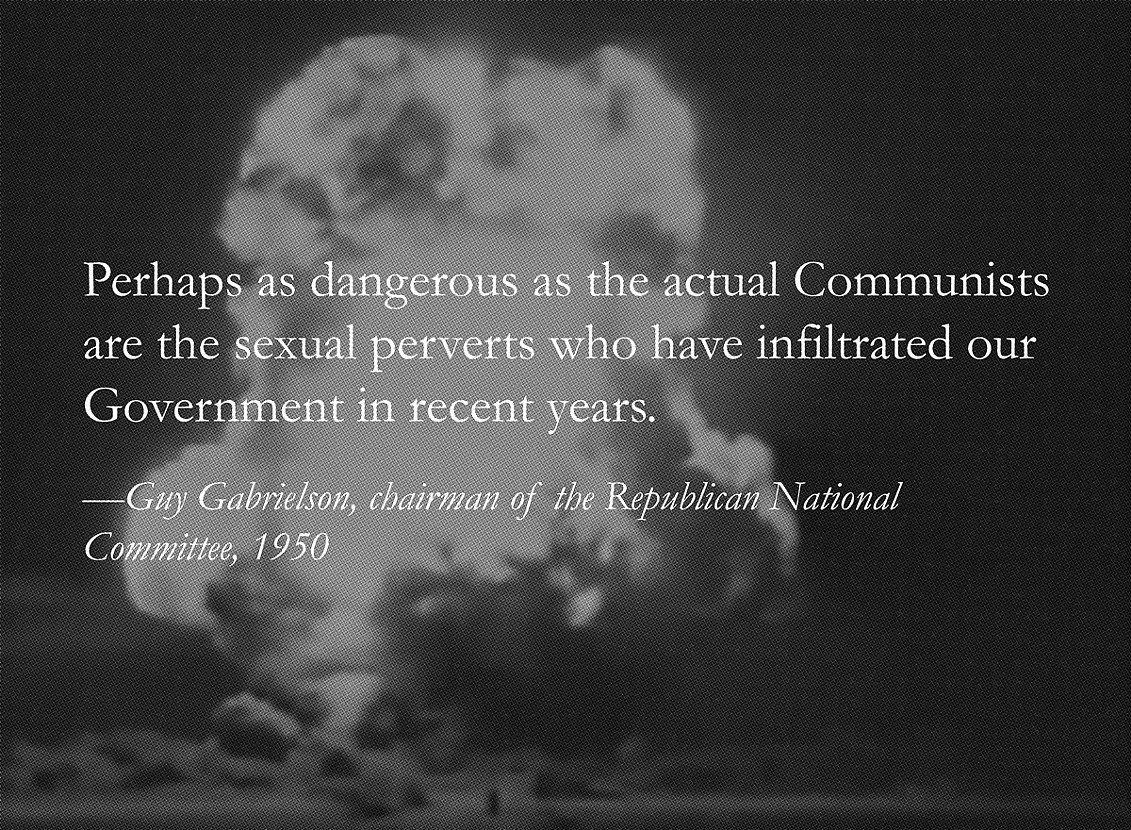
- Artist: Yevgeniy Fiks
- Year: 2012

In a gallery show in 2008, Fiks presented Lenin memorabilia he's collected from eBay, including Lenin busts, small statues, posters, and photographs. Titled Adopt Lenin (2008), he gave these items for free to exhibition attendees after they signed a legal agreement not to put these items back into the market via sales or similar economic exchanges. The signed contracts were also on display as part of the art exhibition.

Fiks' more recent works explore the intersection of identities, the Soviet experience, and the Cold War.

In the conceptual, participatory project A Gift to Birobidzhan (2009), Fiks invited international artists to donate artworks to Birobidzhan, the capital of the Jewish autonomous region in Russia. He repeated a gesture first made in 1936 by American artists to support the establishment of the failed Utopian project Birdobidzhan. The original collection included works by Stuart Davis, Adolf Dehn, Hugo Gellert, Harry Gottlieb, William Gropper, Yasuo Kuniyoshi, Raphael Soyer among others.

Fiks referenced the Lavender Scare in his project Homosexuality is Stalin's Atom Bomb to Destroy America (2012), a collection of artworks including digital prints, photographs, and installation that explore the anti-gay paranoia of the MccArthy era. In his digital print series Stalin's Atom Bomb a.k.a. Homosexuality, Fiks juxtaposed quotes by American pundits and government officials that connected homosexuality to Communism on top of an image of RDS-1, the first Soviet atomic test bomb nicknamed by the American military as "Joe 1". In Joe 1 Cruising in Washington D.C., Fiks photographed a 6-foot cardboard print of "Joe 1" in front of gay cruising sites historically active in D.C. during the Cold War. In the installation piece History of the CPUSA (Harry Hay), he inserted pieces of Harry Hay's biography inside a 1952 edition of History of the Communist Party of the United States by William Z. Foster. Harry Hay was a prominent gay rights activist, communist, and labor rights advocate.

Fiks took on another participatory conceptual project to explore the issue of racial equality in the Soviet Union. In The Wayland Rudd Collection (2014), he collected Soviet visual imagery of Africans and African-Americans, including images depicting and promoting racial equality, and invited international artists to respond to those images in the form of artworks. Submitted works by participating artists to this project reflect on the short-term successes and eventual failures of equality and internationalism in the Soviet Union. Artists included in this project are Dread Scott, Joy Garnett, Kara Lynch, Haim Sokol, and many more. This collection has been exhibited in New York and Harare, Zimbabwe.

Installation view of Yevgeniy Fiks' The Lenin Museum at the Graduate Center's James Gallery in New York

== Books ==
- Moscow, from Ugly Duckling Presse, 2012

- Communist Guide to New York City from Common Books, edited by Common Room with essays by Olga Kopenkina and Kim Foster, 2008

- Lenin for Your Library? from Ante Projects, edited by Nick Herman with an essay by Olga Kopenkina, 2007
