= Yefim Fiks =

Russian politician

- Ефим Фикс
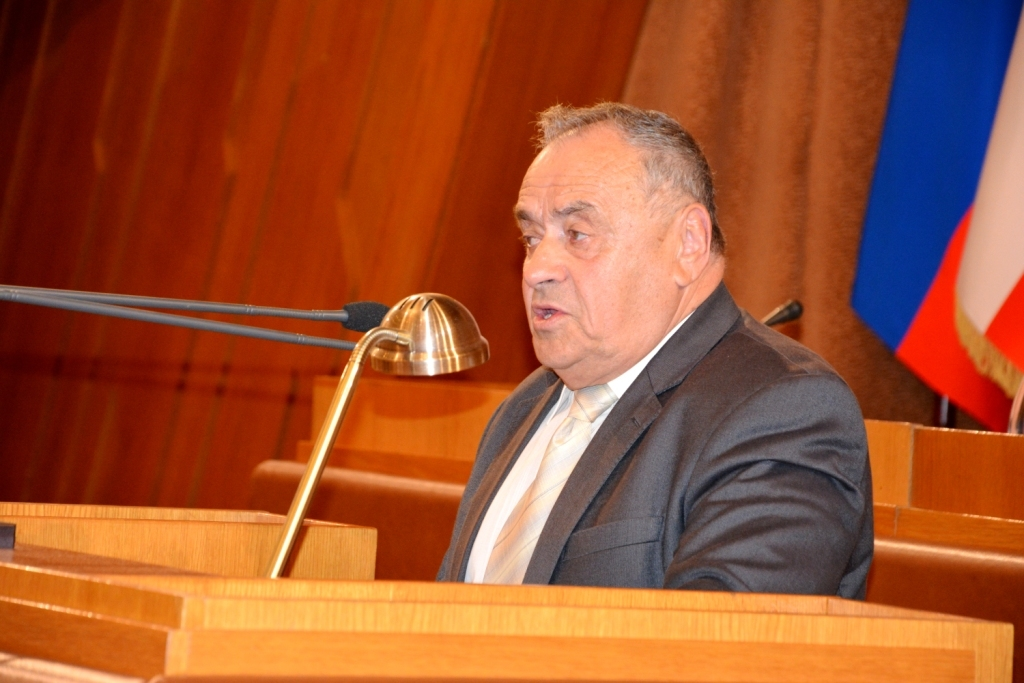
- Fiks in 2018

First Deputy Chairman of the State Council of Crimea
- Incumbent
- Assumed office 14 November 2018
- Preceded by: Andrey Kozenko

Member of the State Council of Crimea
- Incumbent
- Assumed office 19 September 2014

Member of the Verkhovna Rada of Crimea
- In office 24 March 2006 – 19 September 2014

Member of the Verkhovna Rada
- In office 14 February 2004 – 24 March 2006

Personal details
- Born: Yefym Zisiyevych Fiks; 27 November 1946 (age 79) Kovel, Ukraine, Soviet Union
- Party: Party of Regions (Until 2014); United Russia (Since 2014)

Yefim Zisyevich Fiks (Russian: Ефим Зисьевич Фикс; Ukrainian: Єфим Зіс'євич Фікс, romanized: Yefym Zisyevych Fiks; born 27 November 1946) is a Russian politician and former Ukrainian official, currently serving as the deputy Chairman of the Republic of Crimea since 19 September 2018, having been elected in 2014.

He was a member of the Verkhovna Rada from 2004 to 2006.

== Biography ==
Yefym Fiks was born on 27 November 1946 in Kovel. His father, Zisya Khaimovych (1903–1985), was a veteran of the Great Patriotic War. His mother, Henya Khaimivna (1913 - ?), worked as a cleaning lady.

Fiks graduated from the Faculty of History of the Far Eastern State University in 1979.

He served in the Armed Forces from 1965 to 1994, holding various political positions in units and formations in the Leningrad, Far Eastern, and Odesa Military Districts. He achieved the rank as a reserve Colonel.

Between 1993 and 1997, Fiks co-chaired the Party of Social Guarantees of Crimea. From February 1995 to May 1998, he served as deputy director of the Privatchek company in Simferopol.

In 1996, he was the secretary of the Crimean Republican Committee of the Social Democratic Party of Ukraine. From June 1998 to May 2004, he was the Deputy General Director of Tavrichesky Economic and Legal Center LLC in Simferopol.

From 1990 to 1994, Fiks served as a deputy in the Verkhovna Rada of Crimea. On 1 February 2004, he became a people's deputy of Ukraine in the 4th convocation of the Verkhovna Rada, representing the Social Democratic Party of Ukraine. He was a member of the Verkhovna Rada Committee on Rules of Procedure, Deputy Ethics, and Organization. In the 2004 presidential elections, Fiks served as a confidant of Viktor Yanukovych.

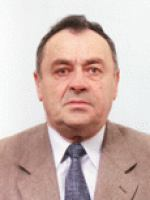
Fiks as a Member of the Verkhovna Rada

On 21 September 2004, Fiks became a member of the Temporary Investigative Commission of the Verkhovna Rada to investigate the circumstances of the poisoning of the presidential candidate, Viktor Yushchenko.

On 25 May 2006, Fiks left the Verkhovna Rada and was reelected to the Crimean Parliament. He was a member of the Presidium of the Supreme Council of the Autonomous Republic of Crimea and led the Solidarity faction. He was reelected again in 2010, this time representing the Party of Regions. He served in the Presidium and chaired the Standing Commission on Rulemaking, Organization of the Verkhovna Rada, and Public Relations.

After the annexation of Crimea in 2014, Fiks became a Russian citizen and was elected as a member of the State Council of the Republic of Crimea on 19 September 2014. On 5 October 2016, he assumed the position of Deputy Chairman of the State Council of Crimea. He later became the First Deputy Chairman on 14 October 2017.

== Criminal prosecution ==
In 2015, the Prosecutor's Office of Ukraine accused Fiks of high treason and placed him on a wanted list.

== Family ==
His wife, Anna Ivanovna Fiks (born 1941), is retired. His son Ilya (born 1973) heads the Department for Public Projects of the Office of the Council of Ministers of the Republic of Crimea.
