= Fik =

Fik or FIK may refer to:

- Festivali i Këngës
- International Kendo Federation
- Maxipes Fik, a Czech cartoon character

== See also ==
- Fiks (disambiguation)
