= Pavel Shperov =

Russian politician

- Павел Шперов
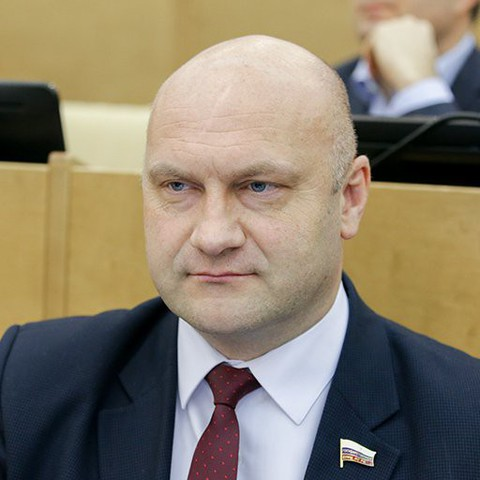

Member of the State Duma
- In office 5 October 2016 – 12 October 2021

Member of the State Council of the Republic of Crimea
- In office 19 September 2014 – 5 October 2016

Personal details
- Born: Pavlo Valentynovych Shperov; 4 July 1971 (age 54) Simferopol, Soviet Union
- Party: Liberal Democratic Party of Russia.

Pavel Valentinovich Shperov (Russian: Павел Валентинович Шперо; Ukrainian: Павло Валентинович Шперов, romanized: Pavlo Valentynovych Shperov; born on 4 July 1971) is a Russian and former Ukrainian politician. He was a deputy of the State Duma of the VII convocation from 5 October 2016 until 12 October 2021.

== Biography ==
Pavel Shperov was born in Simferopol on 4 July 1971.

Between 1988 and 1993, he studied at the Simferopol State University (now the Tavrida National V.I. Vernadsky University), at the Faculty of Physics, specializing in "engineer-physicist", but did not receive a diploma. He had currently studied at the Russian State Social University, specialty "State and Municipal Administration".

Between 1989 and 1991, he was a member of the Orthodox-Monarchical Order-Union.

In February 1991, Shperov joined the Russian Society of Crimea, and became a deputy chairman in 2008.

Since March 1992, Shperov was a member of the Liberal Democratic Party of the Soviet Union. Since April 1992, the party evolved into the Liberal Democratic Party of Russia. In 1993, he was appointed head of the southern bureau of the Liberal Democratic Party of Russia, which united all branches of the party in Ukraine, and in 1996, he became an authorized representative of the Supreme Council of the Liberal Democratic Party in the territory of the Autonomous Republic of Crimea in Ukraine.

Between 1996 and 2005, he was a member of the Congress of the Russian People of Crimea (later the Congress of Russian Communities of Crimea), and was a member of the Congress Duma.

Between 1997 and 2008, he was engaged in private entrepreneurial activity, as from 2008 to 2016, he was the director of RosKrym Company LLC.

Since 2008, he was the chieftain of the “Tauride Cossack Hundreds”. He took part in organizing and conducting events aimed at the return of Crimea to Russia, was a delegate to the World Cossack Congress in Novocherkassk in 2012.

In February 2014, Shperov had become a member of the Crimean self-defense, chief of staff of the 10th company of people's self-defense.

In 2014, Shperov was appointed coordinator of the Crimean Regional Branch (KRO) of the LDPR, and was also elected a member of the Coordinating Council of the KRO LDPR.

From 2014 to 2016, Sheprov was a member of parliament, a deputy of the State Council of the Republic of Crimea of the 1st convocation. He was elected on the lists of the Crimean regional branch of the Liberal Democratic Party (the third number of the general part of the list). He was a member of the committee on agrarian policy, ecology and natural resources, as well as the committee on industrial policy, transport and the fuel and energy complex.

On 18 September 2016, Shperov was elected a member of parliament, a deputy of the State Duma of the VII convocation. He was nominated by the Liberal Democratic Party of Russia (first number in regional group No. 11, Republic of Crimea), and is a member of the LDPR faction. He was member of the Committee for the Commonwealth of Independent States, Eurasian Integration and Relations with Compatriots.

=== Sanctions ===
He was sanctioned by the UK government in 2016 in relation to the Russo-Ukrainian War.

== Family ==
He is married and has three children.
