= Konstantin Bakharev =

Ukrainian journalist

- Константин Бахарев
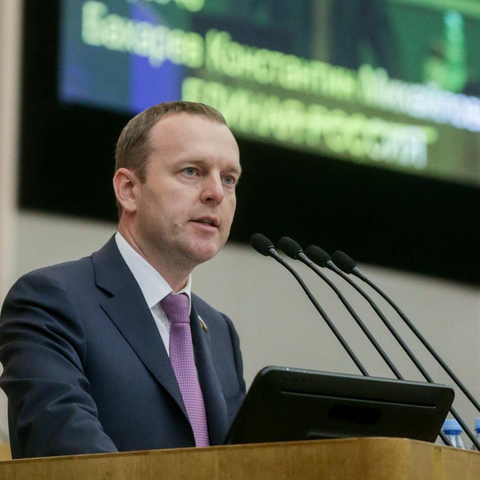
- Bakharev in 2018

Member of the State Duma for Crimea
- Incumbent
- Assumed office 5 October 2016
- Preceded by: constituency established
- Constituency: Kerch (No. 20)

First Deputy Chairman of the State Council of the Republic of Crimea
- In office 1 August 2014 – 5 October 2016
- Succeeded by: Natalya Malenko

First Deputy Chairman of the Verkhovna Rada of Crimea
- In office 16 November 2010 – 21 December 2011
- Preceded by: Sergei Tsekov

Personal details
- Born: Kostyantyn Mykhaylovych Bakharyev; 20 October 1972 (age 53) Simferopol, UkSSR, USSR
- Party: United Russia
- Other political affiliations: Party of Regions (until 2014)
- Spouse: Nonna

Konstantin Mikhailovich Bakharev (Russian: Константин Михайлович Бахарев; Ukrainian: Костянтин Михайлович Бахарєв, romanized: Kostiantyn Mykhailovych Bakhariev; born 20 October 1972) is a Russian and former Ukrainian politician and journalist. He has been a member of parliament of the Russian State Duma, since 5 October 2016, and Deputy Chairman of the State Duma Committee on Financial Markets since 24 October 2019. He is also a member of the Presidium of the General Council of the United Russia party, and the head of the interregional coordinating council of the party in the Southern Federal District.

Bakharev was also the First Deputy Chairman of the Provisional Occupation of Russia in the State Council of the Republic of Crimea from 2014 to 2016. He also served as the First Deputy Chairman of the Verkhovna Rada of Crimea from 2010 to 2011.

== Biography ==
Konstantin Bakharev was born in Simferopol on 20 October 1972, the son of Mykhaylo Oleksiyovych, former deputy chief of the Crimean parliament. In 1992, he graduated from Comprehensive School No. 18, Simferopol. In 1994, he studied at the MV Frunze Simferopol State University with a Russian language and literature degree.

Bakharev was the deputy general director of the Closed Joint Stock Company Investment Fund Crimean Privatization since September 1994. From September 1997 to May 2006, he was the deputy chairman of the Board of the LLC "Editorial Office of the newspaper" Krymskaya Pravda. In May 2006, he became the editor-in-chief of the newspaper.

From 2006 to 2010, Bakharev was a Supreme Council of Crimea's 5th convocation member. From 16 November 2010 to 21 December 2011, he became the First Deputy Chairman of the Supreme Council of Crimea. In 2012, he was a member of the Party of Regions and was nominated as a People's Deputy of Ukraine from the party. From 2010 to 2014, he was a member of the Supreme Council of Crimea's 6th convocation. From 21 December 2011 to 21 March 2014, he became the chairman of the Standing Commission of the Supreme Council of Crimea on rule-making activities, organization of the work of the Supreme Council, and public relations.

On 5 April 2014, Bakharev became a member of the United Russia party. From 2014 to 2016, he was a member of the State Council of the Republic of Crimea's 1st convocation. From 21 March 2014 to 1 August 2014, Bakharev was a Deputy Chairman of the State Council of the Republic of Crimea. From 1 August 2014 to 23 September 2016, Bakharev was the First Deputy Chairman of the State Council of the Republic of Crimea. Since 6 February 2016, he has been a member of the General Council of the United Russia party.

On 5 October 2016, Bakharev became a member of the State Duma of the VII convocation in the Kerch single-mandate constituency No. 20. Since 23 December 2017, he has been a member of the Presidium of the General Council of the United Russia party, and the head of the Interregional Coordination Council for the Southern Federal District.

The Office of the Prosecutor General of Ukraine accuses Bakharev of high treason and has placed him on their wanted list.

=== Sanctions ===
Due to his support of Russian aggression and the violation of Ukraine’s territorial integrity during the Russo-Ukrainian war, he is subject to personal international sanctions imposed by various countries.

Since 2016, he has been under sanctions from all European Union member states and Monaco as a deputy "elected from the illegally annexed 'Republic of Crimea.'" In addition, "he acknowledged his personal involvement in the events of 2014 that led to the illegal annexation of Crimea and Sevastopol".

On 24 February 2022, he was added to Canada’s sanctions list of "regime associates" for "recognizing the independence of the so-called republics in Donetsk and Luhansk".

On 30 September 2022, he was sanctioned by the United States in response to the "sham referendums" and the "annexation of Ukrainian territories by Russian occupying forces". The U.S. State Department noted that the deputies unanimously passed the law on "fake news," and some of them played a key role in spreading Russian disinformation about the war.

On similar grounds, he has been under sanctions by the United Kingdom since 31 December 2020; by Switzerland since 29 September 2020; by Australia since 2 October 2020; by Japan since 12 April 2022; by Ukraine, under a decree issued by President Volodymyr Zelenskyy on 7 September 2022; and by New Zealand since 12 October 2022.

=== Legislative Activity ===
Bakharev co-authored 28 legislative initiatives and amendments to draft federal laws between 2016 and 2020 during his term of office in the 7th State Duma.

== Family ==
Bakharev is married and has two sons. His wife, Nonna, is Georgian by nationality and is the president of a charitable organization.

== Awards ==
Order "For Merit" (3rd Class) (Ukraine, 18 October 2012) — for a significant personal contribution to the socio-economic and cultural-educational development of the Autonomous Republic of Crimea, many years of diligent work, and high professionalism.

Order "For Loyalty to Duty" (13 March 2015) — for special merits in the performance of official and civic duty, impeccable fulfillment of professional obligations, courage, selflessness, and initiative demonstrated during the organization and conduct of the Crimean referendum.

Medal "For the Liberation of Crimea and Sevastopol" (17 March 2014) — for personal contribution to the return of Crimea to Russia.

Order "Commonwealth" (26 November 2015, Interparliamentary Assembly of the CIS) — for active participation in organizing the international television and film forum “Together” and for contributing to strengthening friendship among the peoples of the Commonwealth of Independent States.

Honorary Badge "For Merits in the Development of Press and Information" (16 April 2015, Interparliamentary Assembly of the CIS) — for a significant contribution to the formation and development of the common information space of the CIS member states and to the implementation of cooperation in the field of press and information.

Certificate of Honor of the Government Commission on Compatriots Abroad (2008).

Medal "For Valiant Labor" (11 October 2022).
