= Donske, Crimea =

Donske Донське
- Village
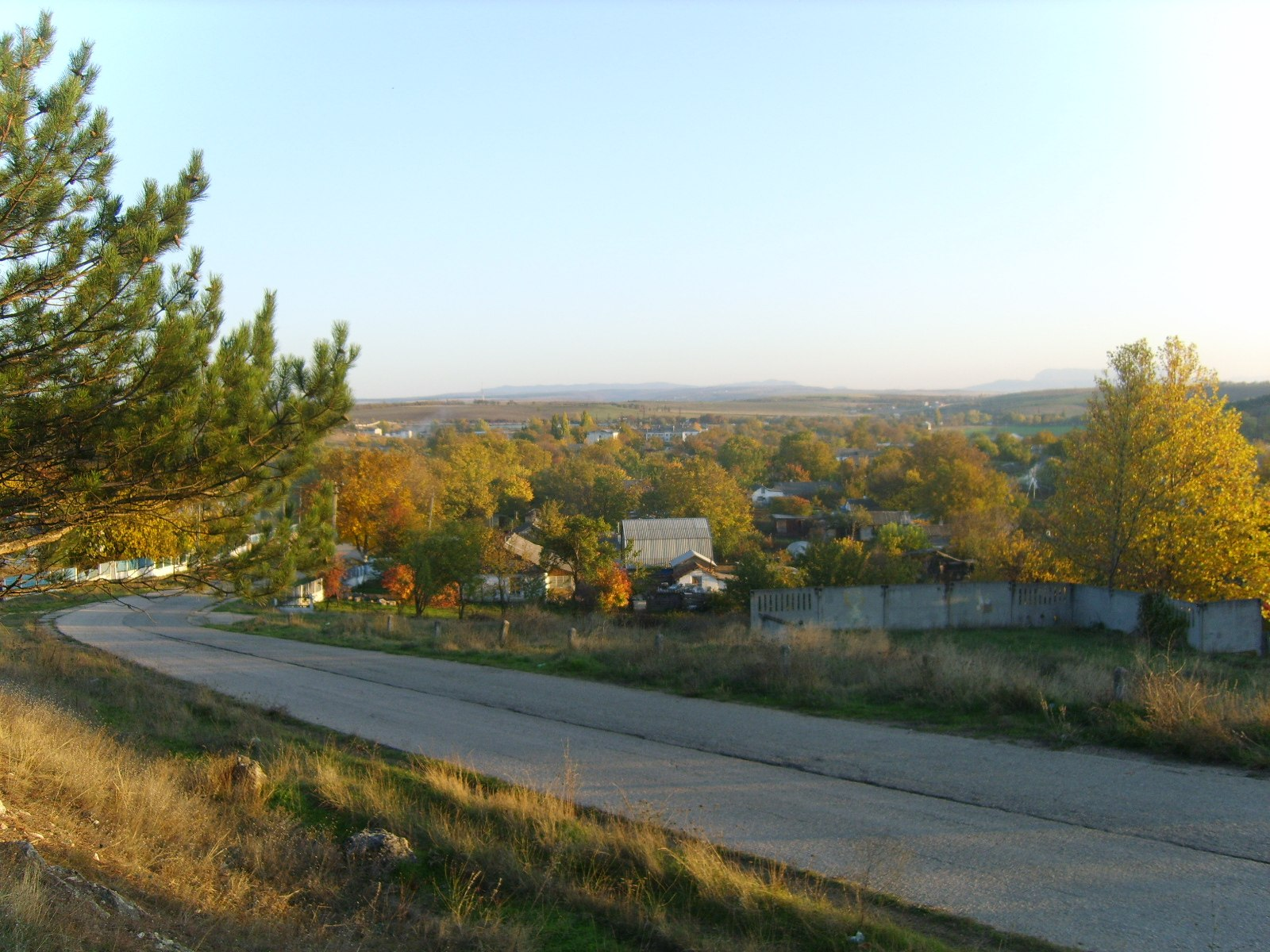

- Location of Donske Location of Donske on map of Crimea
- Coordinates: 45°02′25″N 34°13′20″E
- Country: Disputed: Ukraine (de jure); Russia (de facto)
- Republic: Crimea
- Raion: Simferopol Raion
- Founded: 1784
- Elevation: 275 m (902 ft)

Population (2014)
  - Total: 1,997
- Time zone: UTC+4 (MSK)
- Postcode: 97523
- Area code: +380 652

Donske (Crimean Tatar: Beş Terek, Russian: Донское, Ukrainian: Донське) is a village in Simferopol Raion of Crimea. Population: 1,997 (2014 Census).
