= Alexey Chernyak =

Russian politician (born 1973)

- Алексей Черняк
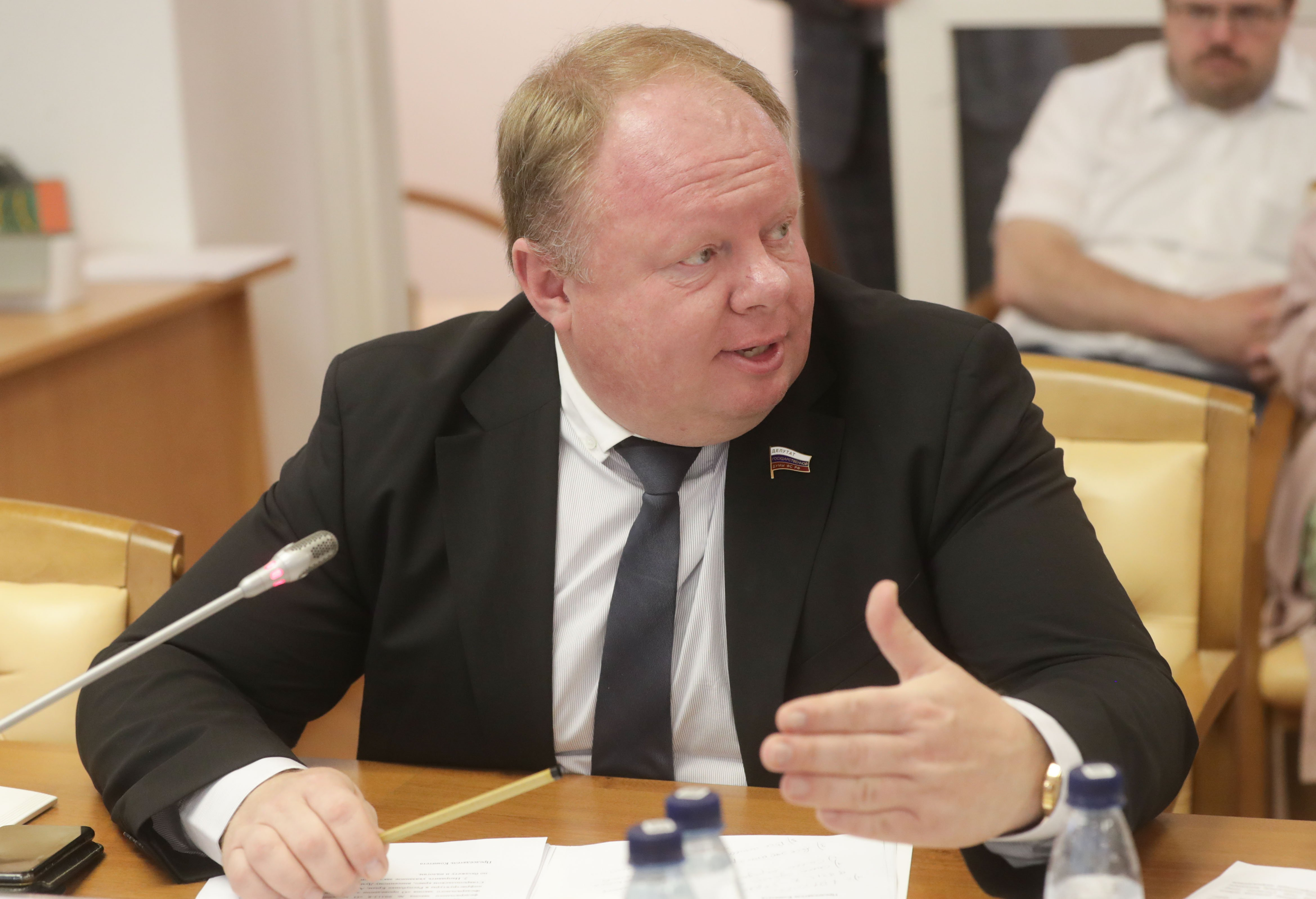

Member of the State Duma from Crimea
- In office 12 October 2021 – 3 September 2022
- Succeeded by: Yury Nesterenko
- Constituency: Simferopol (No. 19)

Personal details
- Born: 27 August 1973 (age 53) Almaty, Kazakh SSR, USSR
- Party: United Russia
- Education: Crimean Federal University (D.Sc.)

Alexey Yuryevich Chernyak (Russian: Алексей Юрьевич Черняк; born 27 August 1973) is a Russian political figure and a former member of the State Duma.

== Biography ==
He was born in Alma-Ata. In 1990, he graduated from Secondary School No. 24 in Simferopol.

In 1995, he graduated from the Military Construction Faculty (reorganized from the SVVPSU) at the Crimean Institute of Environmental and Resort Construction with a degree in "Command Construction of Buildings and Structures."

In 2010, he graduated from the Odessa Regional Institute of Public Administration of the National Academy of Public Administration under the President of Ukraine, receiving the qualification of Master of Public Administration.

In 2018, at the Baltic Academy of Tourism and Entrepreneurship (BАТiP), he defended his dissertation for the degree of Candidate of Economic Sciences, titled "Project Management of the Formation and Comprehensive Development of Yacht Tourism Infrastructure: on the Example of the Republic of Crimea" (academic advisor — Doctor of Economics, Associate Professor L. N. Aristarkhov).

He is a reserve major of the Armed Forces.

== Education and career ==
In 2018, Chernyak was granted a Doctor of Sciences degree in economics; he presented his thesis at the Baltic Academy of Tourism and Entrepreneurship. Chernyak has been engaged in politics since 1999 when he founded the youth public organization "Altamira" in Simferopol. In 2005–2011, he was the Chairman of the Crimean republican youth public organization "Union of Youth of the Regions of Ukraine". He was a member of the Party of Regions, and in 2006, he was elected as a deputy to the Verkhovna Rada of Crimea of the 5th convocation. From 2009 to 2010, he was the Deputy Minister for Youth Affairs, Family and Gender Policy of the Autonomous Republic of Crimea. In September 2014, he was appointed head of the Crimean Parliament's Committee on Health-Resort Complex and Tourism.

In 2014, Chernyak joined the United Russia. From 2014 to 2021, he was a deputy of the State Council of Crimea of the 1st and 2nd convocations. Since September 2021, he has served as a deputy of the 8th State Duma.

== Awards and honors ==
- 2000 — received a Commendation from the Chairman of the Verkhovna Rada of the Autonomous Republic of Crimea;
- 2005 — awarded the Prize of the Cabinet of Ministers of Ukraine for Youth Contribution to State Development for 2004 in the category "For Contribution to the Development of the Youth Movement";
- 2009 — awarded the Prize of the Verkhovna Rada of Ukraine "For Contribution to the Development of Parliamentarism and Local Self-Government by Youth";
- 2010 — awarded the honorary title "Honored Worker of the Social Sphere of the Autonomous Republic of Crimea";
- 2011 — received a Commendation from the Chairman of the Verkhovna Rada of the Autonomous Republic of Crimea;
- 2011 — awarded a Certificate of Honor from the Representative Office of the President of Ukraine in the Autonomous Republic of Crimea;
- 2012 — awarded the Distinction of the Autonomous Republic of Crimea "For Fidelity to Duty";
- 2013 — awarded a Certificate of Honor from the Presidium of the Verkhovna Rada of the Autonomous Republic of Crimea;
- 2014 — awarded the Medal of the Order "For Merit to the Fatherland", 2nd Class;
- 2015 — awarded the Order "For Fidelity to Duty";
- 2018 — awarded the medal "For Valiant Labor".

He was also decorated with:

- the Imperial Order of Saint Anna, 1st Class;
- the Order of Saint Nicholas the Wonderworker, 3rd Class;
- the Order of the Holy Great Martyr George the Victorious of the Ukrainian Orthodox Church;
- the medal "For Contribution to Underwater Activities";
- the medal "For Fidelity to Duty and the Fatherland";
- the medal "50 Years of the Confederation of Underwater Activities of Russia";
- six commemorative and anniversary medals and one order.

=== Sanctions ===
He was sanctioned by the UK government in 2022 in relation to the Russo-Ukrainian War.
