= 1950 in the Soviet Union =

- Decades: 1930s; 1940s; 1950s; 1960s; 1970s
- See also: History of the Soviet Union; List of years in the Soviet Union

The following lists events that happened during 1950 in the Union of Soviet Socialist Republics.

== Incumbents ==
- General Secretary of the Communist Party of the Soviet Union — Joseph Stalin
- Chairman of the Presidium of the Supreme Soviet of the Soviet Union — Nikolay Shvernik
- Chairman of the Council of Ministers of the Soviet Union — Joseph Stalin

== Events ==
=== January ===
- January 5 — 1950 Sverdlovsk air disaster

=== February ===
- February 14 — The Sino-Soviet Treaty of Friendship, Alliance and Mutual Assistance is concluded.

=== March ===
- March 12 — Soviet Union legislative election, 1950

=== April ===
- April 2 — Drifting ice station North Pole-2 is established.

=== June ===
- June 28 – July 4 — The Pavlovian session is held.

=== August ===
- August 13 — The steamer Mayakovsky sinks in Riga, killing 147 people in the deadliest peacetime Soviet shipping disaster.

== Births ==
- January 3 — Masha and Dasha Krivoshlyapova, Russian ischiopagus tripus conjoined twins (d. 2003)
- January 17 — Viktor Kosykh, Soviet and Russian theater and cinema actor (d. 2011)
- January 21 — Leonid Kosakivsky, First elected mayor of Kyiv
- February 17 — Albertas Simenas, 2nd Prime Minister of Lithuania
- March 21 — Sergey Lavrov, 4th Minister of Foreign Affairs of the Russian Federation
- April 8 — Yevgeny Savchenko, 2nd Governor of Belgorod Oblast
- April 12 — Pavel Ipatov, 2nd Governor of Saratov Oblast
- April 16 — Igor Farkhutdinov, 3rd Governor of Sakhalin Oblast (d. 2003)
- April 20 — Alexander Lebed, 3rd Governor of Krasnoyarsk Krai (d. 2002)
- April 25 — Boris Ebzeyev, 3rd Head of Karachay-Cherkessia
- May 6 — Mikhail Myasnikovich, 7th Prime Minister of Belarus
- May 12 — Viktor Ivanov, director of the Federal Drug Control Service of Russia
- May 17 — Valeriya Novodvorskaya, Soviet and Russian dissident, writer and liberal politician (d. 2014)
- May 31
  - Edgar Savisaar, 1st Prime Minister of the Interim Government of Estonia (d. 2022)
  - Alexander Filipenko, 1st Governor of Khanty-Mansi Autonomous Okrug
- June 18 — Alexander Solovyov, 2nd Head of the Udmurt Republic (d. 2023)
- June 22 — Zenonas Petrauskas, Lithuanian lawyer and diplomat (d. 2009)
- June 26 — Jaak Joala, Estonian singer (d. 2010)
- July 9 — Viktor Yanukovych, 4th President of Ukraine
- August 11 — Gennadiy Nikonov, Russian weapons designer (d. 2003)
- August 23 — Roza Otunbayeva, 3rd President of Kyrgyzstan
- August 25 — Oleg Betin, 2nd Governor of Tambov Oblast (d. 2023)
- September 1 — Mikhail Fradkov, 8th Prime Minister of Russia
- October 1 — Boris Morukov, Russian physicist and astronaut (d. 2015)
- October 4 — Oleg Bogomolov, 3rd Governor of Kurgan Oblast
- November 9 — Dmitry Ayatskov, 2nd Governor of Saratov Oblast
- November 16 — Viktor Shershunov, 2nd Governor of Kostroma Oblast (d. 2007)
- December 7 — Hasanaga Sadigov, Azerbaijani ashik singer (d. 2018)
- December 9 — Vladimir Pekhtin, Russian politician
- December 11 — Alexander Tatarsky, Russian film director (d. 2007)
- December 15 — Boris Gryzlov, 3rd Chairman of the State Duma of the Russian Federation
- December 16 — Seyran Valiyev, Azerbaijani paleogeographer and historian (d. 2013).
- December 21 — Nikolay Kiselyov, 3rd Governor of Arkhangelsk Oblast
- December 24 — Mustafa Batdyyev, 2nd Head of Karachay-Cherkessia

== Deaths ==
- March 15 — Alexander Kobiskoy, WWII air force flying ace (b. 1920)
- April 8 — Vaslav Nijinsky, ballet dancer and choreographer (b. 1889)
- May 20 — Peter Petrovich Troyanskii, educator and scholar (b. 1894)
- June 26 — Antonina Nezhdanova, soprano (b. 1873)
- July 12 — Lev Galler, admiral (b. 1883)
- August 8 — Nikolai Myaskovsky, composer (b. 1881)
- August 24
  - Grigory Kulik, military officer (b. 1890)
  - Vasily Gordov, general (b. 1896)
- October 1
  - Nikolai Voznesensky, politician and economic planner (b. 1903)
  - Alexey Kuznetsov, statesman and functionary (b. 1905)
  - Mikhail Rodionov, 9th Chairman of the Council of Ministers of the Russian SFSR (b. 1907)
- October 19 — Viktor Strazhev, bibliographer, translator, poet and literary critic (b. 1879)
- November 12 — Hryhoriy Lakota, Eastern Catholic bishop (b. 1883)
- November 13 — Antonina Zubkova, WWII bomber pilot (b. 1920)

== See also ==
- 1950 in fine arts of the Soviet Union
- List of Soviet films of 1950
