= Soviet Russia (exhibition, 1960) =

1960 Soviet art exhibition

First National Art Exhibition "Soviet Russia". Catalog cover
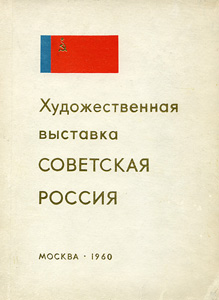
- Year: 1960
- Location: Manezh Exhibition Hall; Moscow

First National Art Exhibition "Soviet Russia" (Moscow, 1960) (Russian: Первая Республиканская художественная выставка "Советская Россия" 1960 года) was one of the largest Soviet art exhibitions of the 1960s. The exhibition took place in Manezh Exhibition Hall.

== History and organization ==
In four months of the exhibition was visited by over 400,000 people. Organization and preparation of the First National Exhibition engaged specially formed Exhibition Committee in the amount of 97 most authoritative experts in the field of fine arts. It was published Catalog of the exhibition. In total, the Exhibition displayed more than 2,400 works of art of painters, sculptors, graphics, masters of arts and crafts, artists of theater and cinema. Many of art works have been purchased for the largest Soviet Art museums, including the Russian Museum, the Tretyakov Gallery, and others. After the Exhibition in Moscow there were organized traveling exhibitions, which have been shown in major cities of the Russian Federation.

== Contributing artists ==
In the largest Department of Painting were exhibited art works by over 500 authors. There were Nikolai Abramov, Nikolai Andretsov, Irina Baldina, Leonid Baykov, Vsevolod Bazhenov, Dmitry Belyaev, Zlata Bizova, Mikhail Bobyshov, Olga Bogaevskaya, Nikolai Brandt, Piotr Buchkin, Alexander Deyneka, Vasily Efanov, Oleg Eremeev, Alexei Eriomin, Nikolai Galakhov, Sergey Gerasimov, Ilya Glazunov, Igor Grabar, Aleksei Gritsai, Mikhail Kaneev, Boris Ioganson, Maya Kopitseva, Boris Korneev, Gely Korzhev, Engels Kozlov, Alexander Kuprin, Alexander Laktionov, Valeria Larina, Boris Lavrenko, Ivan Lavsky, Anatoli Levitin, Piotr Litvinsky, Oleg Lomakin, Gavriil Malish, Eugene Maltsev, Boris Maluev, Evsey Moiseenko, Dmitriy Nalbandyan, Mikhail Natarevich, Samuil Nevelshtein, Yaroslav Nikolaev, Dmitry Oboznenko, Victor Oreshnikov, Nikolai Ovchinnikov, Vladimir Ovchinnikov, Filaret Pakun, Varlen Pen, Arkady Plastov, Nikolai Pozdneev, Alexander Pushnin, Semion Rotnitsky, Galina Rumiantseva, Ivan Savenko, Vladimir Sakson, Alexander Samokhvalov, Gleb Savinov, Vladimir Seleznev, Joseph Serebriany, Vladimir Serov, Nadezhda Shteinmiller, Kim Slavin, Galina Smirnova, Alexander Sokolov, Nikolai Timkov, Mikhail Trufanov, Yuri Tulin, Boris Ugarov, Anatoli Vasiliev, Nina Veselova, Igor Veselkin, Vecheslav Zagonek, Sergei Zakharov, and many others most prominent painters of the Russian Federation.

In the Department of Sculptures were exhibited art works by Mikhail Anikushin, Lev Kerbel, Alexander Kibalnikov, Vsevolod Lishev, Sergey Konenkov, Ernst Neizvestny, Nikolai Tomsky, Vasily Vatagin, and many others most prominent sculptors of the Russian Federation.

== Contributed artworks ==
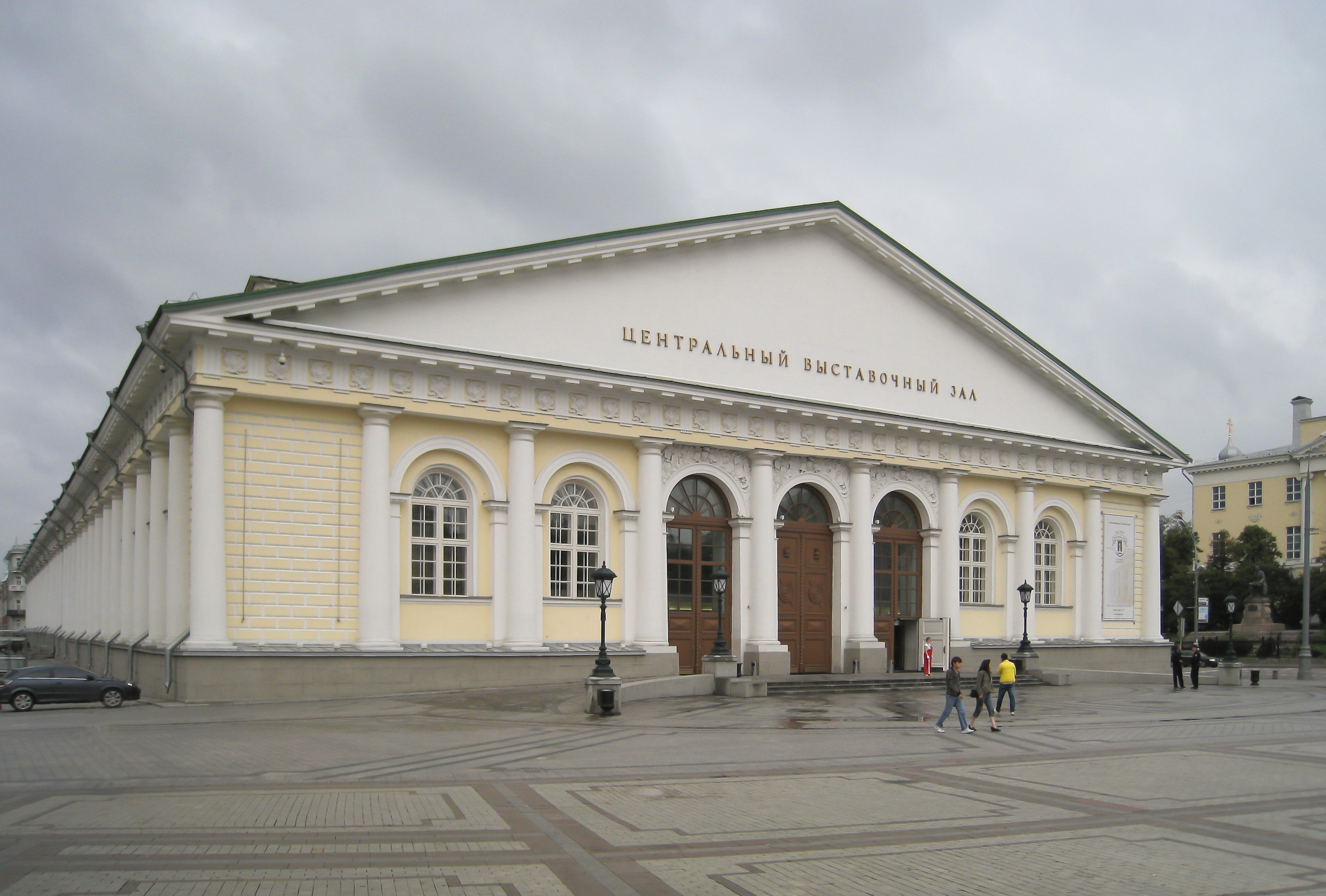
Moscow Manezh Exhibition Hall. 2008

For display at the Exhibition were selected art works created in 1959–1960, as well as some earlier works. Many of them were previously shown at the city and regional Art Exhibitions and were subsequently found in the collections of Soviet Art museums, as well as domestic and foreign galleries and collectors.

Historical genre was presented of "The October slogans of Peace. Petrograd in 1917" by Alexander Deyneka, "For the homeland" by Vladimir Gavrilov, "Close to the Narva Gate. 1917 year" by Alexander Deyneka, "Sons of Russia" by Oleg Eremeev, "In the name of the Motherland" by Boris Fedorov, "The First faculty for the workers" by Leonid Krivitsky, "International", "The Man who Raising the Banner" by Gely Korzhev, "In Summer of 1941" by Yuri Kugach, "The year of 1941. The War has beginning" by Boris Lavrenko, "Private soldier of the October Revolution" by Anatoli Levitin, "Lenin says" by Piotr Litvinsky, "We construct a new world" by Piotr Litvinsky, Victor Reykhet, and Vladimir Scriabin, "A New Boss" by Oleg Lomakin, "A First Cavalry Army" by Boris Maluev, "Citizen Militias" by Evsey Moiseenko, "Defenders of Petrograd" by Konstantin Molteninov, "The End of illusions. Bloody Sunday (1905)" by Yaroslav Nikolaev, "At the Barricades" by Dmitry Oboznenko, "The First furrow" by Nikolai Ovchinnikov, "Lenin wounded" by Avenir Parkhomenko, "The liberation of North Korea" by Varlen Pen, "Mikula Selyaninovich" by Georgy Pesis, "October", "Guerrillas" by Vsevolod Petrov-Maslakov, "On a halt" by Igor Razdrogin, "Always with us" by Victor Reykhet, "On the peaceful land" by Alexander Romanichev, "About Russian Woman" by Gleb Savinov, "A Soul of soldier" by Fedor Savostianov, "In the Leningrad Philharmonic. Year of 1942" by Joseph Serebriany, "Spring of the Great Break" by Alexander Sokolov, "Guerilla trails" by Vasily Sokolov, "Story about the Blockade" by Yuri Tulin, "For who is right?" by Nina Veselova, and others.

Portrait was presented of "Natasha" by Irina Baldina, "Grain growers" by Piotr Buchkin, "Portrait of Seslavskaya, metro builder", "Marinka" by Vasily Efanov, "Collective farm Chairman", "A Young woman - collective farmer", "Shock-worker" by Sergey Gerasimov, "Milkmaid Raisa Trifonova" by Ilya Glazunov, "Selfportrait" by Igor Grabar, "A Member of the Supreme Council" by Boris Ioganson, "Locksmith Kovalev", "Portrait of a brigadier Perepiolkin", "Portrait of milkmaid Kuznetsova", "Woman tractor driver" by Leonid Kabachek, "Portrait of Katia Baltina", "A Working woman" by Boris Korneev, "Portrait of Rudenko, Kirov Plant Metallurgist" by Valeria Larina, "The school nurse", "A Loader" by Anatoli Levitin, "Milkmaid Sergeeva" by Vladimir Malagis, "Portrait of sculptor Valentina Rybalko" by Evsey Moiseenko, "Portrait of Semyon Budyonny" by Dmitriy Nalbandyan, "Portrait of student", "Girl partisan" by Samuil Nevelshtein, "Portrait of Chinese student", "Portrait of People's artist Thapsaev", "Portrait of architect Vasilkovsky" by Victor Oreshnikov, "Portrait of Birukov, turner - innovator" by Valery Pimenov, "Soldier Mikhail Matveev", "The driver of electropenalty Antonina Goriachkina" by Semion Rotnitsky, "Portrait of worker Fedor Bezuglov" by Joseph Serebriany, "Portrait of foremost milker Zlobina", "Portrait of Zhukov, collective farm's director" by Vladimir Stozharov, "Girl with pussy-willow" by Vladimir Tokarev, "A Miner", "Female portrait", "A Portrait of miner" by Mikhail Trufanov, "Portrait of diver Dombrovsky" by Anatoli Vasiliev, "Sergei Esenin" by Igor Veselkin, "Portrait of Mikhail Dolgov" by Nina Veselova, and others.

Genre painting was presented of "Excavator drivers" by Nikolai Abramov, "Bratsk begins" by Adolf Alexeev, "In the village of fishermen" by Nikolai Andretsov, "Spring in the collective farm", "Return of the Herd" by Leonid Baykov, "Launching of tanker Beijing" by Vsevolod Bazhenov, "Gests of Festival in the collective farm" by Dmitry Belyaev, "Comeback" by Zlata Bizova, "Moscow. Salute to the Victory" by Mikhail Bobyshov, "Guests" by Olga Bogaevskaya, "Young Pioneers welcome delegates of the 21st Congress of the Communist Party of the Soviet Union" by Vasily Efanov, "Sibirian village", "On the roads of Karelia" by Nikolai Galakhov, "Poultry farm" by Taras Gaponenko, "Rural landscape" by Sergey Gerasimov, "Morning of industrial Neva River" by Krum Dzhakov, "Ural Plant" by Meta Dreyfeld, "Geologists" by Alexei Eriomin, "About Club", "The winners of the horse races" by Leonid Kabachek, "A Youth of the Donbas. After the work shift" by Boris Kharchenko, "Three of them" by Maya Kopitseva, "Development of the North" by Boris Korneev, "Homer. (The worker's art studio)", "Enamoured" by Gely Korzhev, "On The Finish" by Anna Kostina, "Ship Repairers" by Engels Kozlov, "Going to the housewarming" by Yuri Kugach, "Veterans of the Russian theatre scene" by Alexander Laktionov, "Towards the new lands" by Anatoli Levitin, "Close to the Baltic Sea", "Girlfriends", "Northern Loggers" by Nikolai Lomakin, "To work at the collective farm" by Oleg Lomakin, "Last steamer" by Eugene Maltsev, "A Midday", "Evening" by Mikhail Natarevich, "During the break of Congress" by Dmitry Oboznenko, "Caspian Sea" by Vladimir Ovchinnikov, "In January" by Georgy Pesis, "A Summer" by Arkady Plastov, "The Leningrad", "They started the Bratsk Hydroelectric Power Station" by Yuri Podlasky, "North Bazaar" by Nikolai Pozdneev, "Carousel", "At the Fair", "In the district of new houses" by Alexander Pushnin, "The Golden Land" by Victor Reykhet, "To the fair" by Vasily Rudnev, "Quiet time" by Galina Rumiantseva, "To the Carnival", "Holiday evening on the Neva River" by Nikolai Rutkovsky, "A Tribe of young" by Alexander Samokhvalov, "On the Neva River" by Fedor Savostianov, "To the Hermitage" by Alexander Segal, "Train drivers" by Vladimir Seleznev, "After a work shift" by Galina Smirnova, "Blacksmiths. The Night shift" by Alexander Sokolov, "Arrival at the Congress of the foremost collective farmers" by Vladimir Stozharov, "Bazaar in the Kuban" by Vladimir Tokarev, "Builders of the Volkhov Hydroelectric Station" by Boris Ugarov, "Holiday in Voronovo village (Chuvashia)", "Spring of chauffeurs" by Nina Veselova and Leonid Kabachek, "In memory of the victims", "Bathing soldiers" by Dmitry Zhilinsky, and others.

Landscape and Cityscape were presented of "Moscow Kremlin in winter" by Mikhail Bobyshov, "Northern spring" by Nikolai Galakhov, "Stolby Nature Sanctuary" by Yakov Golubev, "Birch alley" by Igor Grabar, "Stormy day", "Green rye", "On the Oka River", "Windy day", "In beginning of October" by Aleksei Gritsai, "Kizhi" by Alexei Eriomin, "Gorokhovaya Street in Leningrad", "A Former Sennaya Square in Leningrad" by Mikhail Kaneev, "Kosogorsky Steel Works", "Kosogorsky Steel Works. In the Evening" by Alexander Kuprin, "Spring day. The Lilac is bloom" by Yuri Kugach, "Ostrovsky Square in Leningrad" by Ivan Lavsky, "Northern village", "A Northern river" by Nikolai Lomakin, "Rural landscape" by Gavriil Malish, "Native places" by Eugene Maltsev, "Veliky Novgorod" by Filaret Pakun, "In Spring" by Nikolai Pozdneev, "Listvianka village" by Vladimir Sakson, "A Winter on the Msta River", "Autumn in the Ural Mountains", "Close to the Leningrad", "North Ural" by Ivan Savenko, "The Leningrad landscape" by Gleb Savinov, "Twilight" by Nadezhda Shteinmiller, "A Mill in Grigorovka village", "Got cold" by Vladimir Stozharov, "Alexander Suvorov Monument", "Lion Bridge", "Nevsky Prospekt in evening" by George Tatarnikov, "Beginning of spring", "The Evening. A Lilac hour", "March Sun", "Young Aspens in winter", "Turning Green", "October. A First snow" by Nikolai Timkov, "A Park" by Yuri Tulin, "Close to Ryazan" by Igor Veselkin, "A Morning", "Baykal Lake motive" by Vecheslav Zagonek, "Malaya Okhta in Spring" by Sergei Zakharov, and others.

Still-life paintings were presented of "Still life" by Olga Bogaevskaya, "Roses" by Igor Grabar, "Lilac" by Boris Ioganson, "Autumn Bird-Cherry tree", "The Apple branch in bloom", "Lemons. Still life" by Maya Kopitseva, "Still life. A Winter" by Nikolai Pozdneev, "Still life. A Breakfast" by Kim Slavin, "Still life" by Vladimir Stozharov, "Flowers" by Nina Veselova, "Still life" by Sergei Zakharov, and others.

== Acknowledgment ==
First National Art Exhibition "Soviet Russia" were widely covered in the press and literature on Soviet fine art.

== See also ==
- Soviet art
- 1960 in fine arts of the Soviet Union
- Fine Art of Leningrad
- Leningrad School of Painting
- Saint Petersburg Union of Artists

== Sources ==
- Республиканская художественная выставка «Советская Россия». Живопись. Скульптура. Графика. Плакат. Монументально-декоративное и театрально-декорационное искусство. Каталог. М., Министерство культуры РСФСР, 1960.
- К новым творческим успехам. С собрания ленинградских художников // Вечерний Ленинград, 1960, 14 мая.
- Художники Российской Федерации. Открытие выставки в Ленинграде // Вечерний Ленинград, 1960, 9 августа.
- Шмаринов Д. Новый этап - новые задачи // Художник. 1960, No. 8. С.2-7.
- Художник. 1960, No. 9. С.62.
- Справочник членов Ленинградской организации Союза художников РСФСР. Л., Художник РСФСР, 1980.
- Художники народов СССР. Биобиблиографический словарь. Т. 1-4. М., Искусство, 1970–1995.
- Справочник членов Союза художников СССР. Том 1,2. М., Советский художник, 1979.
- Time for Change. The Art of 1960-1985 in the Soviet Union. - Saint Petersburg: State Russian Museum, 2006.
- Sergei V. Ivanov. Unknown Socialist Realism. The Leningrad School.- Saint Petersburg: NP-Print Edition, 2007. ISBN 5-901724-21-6, ISBN 978-5-901724-21-7.
