= 1950 in fine arts of the Soviet Union =

The year 1950 was marked by many events that left an imprint on the history of Soviet and Russian Fine Arts.

== Events ==
- The Repin Institute of Arts graduated young artists Evgenia Antipova, Anatoli Vasiliev, Nina Veselova, Vecheslav Zagonek, Tatiana Kopnina, Alexandra Levushina, Nikita Medovikov, Nikolai Mukho, Alexander Pushnin, Alexander Sokolov, Yuri Tulin, and others.
- November 18 — The Fine Art Exhibition of works by Leningrad artists of 1950 opened in the State Russian museum. The participants were Vsevolod Bazhenov, Rostislav Vovkushevsky, Sergei Zakharov, Ruben Zakharian, Nikolai Kostrov, Anna Kostrova, Yevsey Moiseenko, Mikhail Natarevich, Yaroslav Nikolaev, Yuri Neprintsev, Sergei Osipov, Gleb Sevinov, Alexander Samokhvalov, Victor Teterin, Nikolai Timkov, Yuri Tulin, Rudolf Frentz, and other important Leningrad artists.
- December 20 — The All-Union Fine Art Exhibition of 1950 opened in Tretyakov gallery in Moscow. The participants were Samuil Adlivankin, Nikolai Babasuk, Vasily Baksheev, Fiodor Bogorodsky, Anatoli Vasiliev, Piotr Vasiliev, Nina Veselova, Vasily Vikulov, Aleksandr Gerasimov, Aleksei Gritsai, Vecheslav Zagonek, Sergei Zakharov, Boris Ioganson, Alexander Kuprin, Vladimir Malagis, Yevsey Moiseenko, Dmitriy Nalbandyan, Mikhail Natarevich, Yaroslav Nikolaev, Alexander Pushnin, Ivan Savenko, Leonid Tkachenko, Yuri Tulin, Rudolf Frentz, and other important soviet artists.
- Stalin Prize winner of 1950 in the area of Fine Arts were sculptors Matvey Manizer, Nikolai Tomsky, Vladimir Tsigal, Lev Kerbel, Veniamin Pinchuk, painters and graphic artists Victor Oreshnikov, Tetyana Yablonska, Kukryniksy, Vasily Yefanov, Sergei Grigoriev, Boris Yefimov, Boris Prorokov, Gavriil Gorelov, and others.

== Deaths ==
- January 8 — Yefim Cheptsov, (Russian: Чепцов Ефим Михайлович), Russian soviet painter, Honored Art worker of Russian Federation (born 1874).
- May 3 - Semion Abugov, (Russian: Абугов Семён Львович), Russian soviet painter and teacher, professor of Repin Institute of Arts (born 1877).
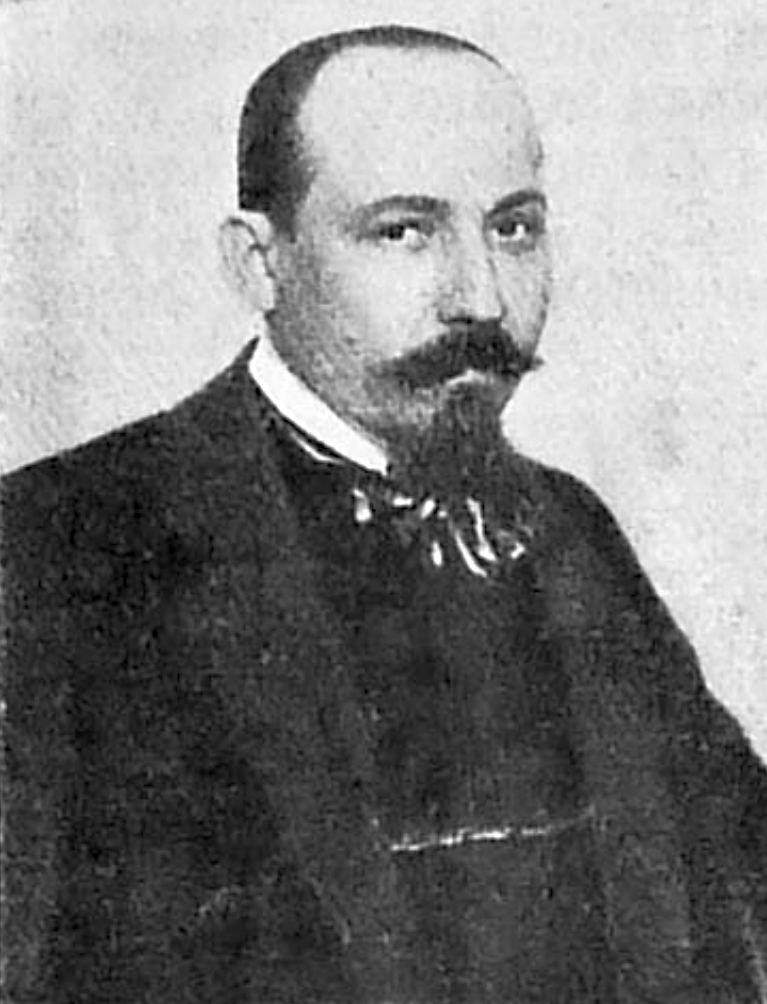
Yefim Cheptsov

== See also ==
- List of Russian artists
- List of painters of Leningrad Union of Artists
- Saint Petersburg Union of Artists
- Russian culture
- 1950 in the Soviet Union

== Sources ==
- Художественная выставка 1950 года. Живопись. Скульптура. Графика. Каталог. М., Советский художник, 1950.
- Выставка произведений ленинградских художников 1950 года. Каталог. Л., ЛССХ, 1951.
- Artists of Peoples of the USSR. Biography Dictionary. Vol. 1. Moscow, Iskusstvo, 1970.
- Artists of Peoples of the USSR. Biography Dictionary. Vol. 2. Moscow, Iskusstvo, 1972.
- Выставки советского изобразительного искусства. Справочник. Т.4. 1948—1953 годы. М., Советский художник, 1976.
- Directory of Members of Union of Artists of USSR. Volume 1,2. Moscow, Soviet Artist Edition, 1979.
- Directory of Members of the Leningrad branch of the Union of Artists of Russian Federation. Leningrad, Khudozhnik RSFSR, 1980.
- Artists of Peoples of the USSR. Biography Dictionary. Vol. 4 Book 1. Moscow, Iskusstvo, 1983.
- Directory of Members of the Leningrad branch of the Union of Artists of Russian Federation. - Leningrad: Khudozhnik RSFSR, 1987.
- Artists of peoples of the USSR. Biography Dictionary. Vol. 4 Book 2. - Saint Petersburg: Academic project humanitarian agency, 1995.
- Link of Times: 1932 - 1997. Artists - Members of Saint Petersburg Union of Artists of Russia. Exhibition catalogue. - Saint Petersburg: Manezh Central Exhibition Hall, 1997.
- Matthew C. Bown. Dictionary of 20th Century Russian and Soviet Painters 1900-1980s. London, Izomar, 1998.
- Vern G. Swanson. Soviet Impressionism. Woodbridge, England, Antique Collectors' Club, 2001.
- Время перемен. Искусство 1960—1985 в Советском Союзе. СПб., Государственный Русский музей, 2006.
- Sergei V. Ivanov. Unknown Socialist Realism. The Leningrad School. Saint-Petersburg, NP-Print Edition, 2007. ISBN 5-901724-21-6, ISBN 978-5-901724-21-7.
- Anniversary Directory graduates of Saint Petersburg State Academic Institute of Painting, Sculpture, and Architecture named after Ilya Repin, Russian Academy of Arts. 1915 - 2005. Saint Petersburg: Pervotsvet Publishing House, 2007.
