= Mayakovsky (disambiguation) =

Vladimir Mayakovsky (1893–1930) was a Russian poet and playwright, among the foremost representatives of early-20th century Russian Futurism.

Mayakovsky (masculine), Mayakovskaya (feminine), or Mayakovskoye (neuter) may also refer to:

- Mayakovsky, name of the town of Baghdati, Georgia in 1940–1991
- Mayakovski, Armenia, a town in Armenia renamed in honor of Mayakovsky
- Mayakovskoye, a rural locality (a settlement) in Kaliningrad Oblast, Russia
- Mayakovsky Theatre in Moscow, named after Mayakovsky
- Mayakovskaya (Moscow Metro), a station of the Moscow Metro, named after Mayakovsky
- Mayakovskaya (Saint Petersburg Metro), a station of the Saint Petersburg Metro, named after Mayakovsky
- Mayakovsky (ship), a steamer that sank in Latvia in 1950.
- 2931 Mayakovsky (1969 UC), an asteroid named after Mayakovsky

== See also ==
- Nikolai Myaskovsky (1881–1950), Russian and Soviet composer
- Majakowskiring, an ellipse-shaped street in Berlin, Germany named after Vladimir Mayakovsky
- Triumfalnaya Square in Moscow, commonly known as Mayakovsky Square
