= ARKA Gallery (Saint Petersburg) =

Saint Petersburg art gallery of contemporary and modern Russian and foreign painting

- Established: 2004
- Location: 6 Bolshaya Morskaya Street; Saint Petersburg, 190000, Russian Federation
- Type: Art
- Director: Eugenia Logvinova
- Website: Gallery

ARKA Gallery (Russian: Галерея АРКА, romanized: Galereja ARKA) is an art gallery. It is located at 6 Bolshaya Morskaya Street in the historical center of Saint Petersburg City, Russia. ARKA Gallery specialized in contemporary and modern Russian and foreign painting and fine art legacy of the Leningrad School artists of 1930–1980s.

== Location ==
ARKA Gallery is located between Nevsky Prospekt, the Palace Square and the Hermitage Museum. It is located in the historical building in Eclectic style that belonged to the banker K. Feleigsen. It was rebuilt by architect Ferdinand Miller in 1879-1880. Many years there was a Hotel d`France, some famous persons lived in it like Russian writers Ivan Turgenev and Alexey Tolstoy. Now has a display area of more than 2,100 square feet (200 m2).

== History ==
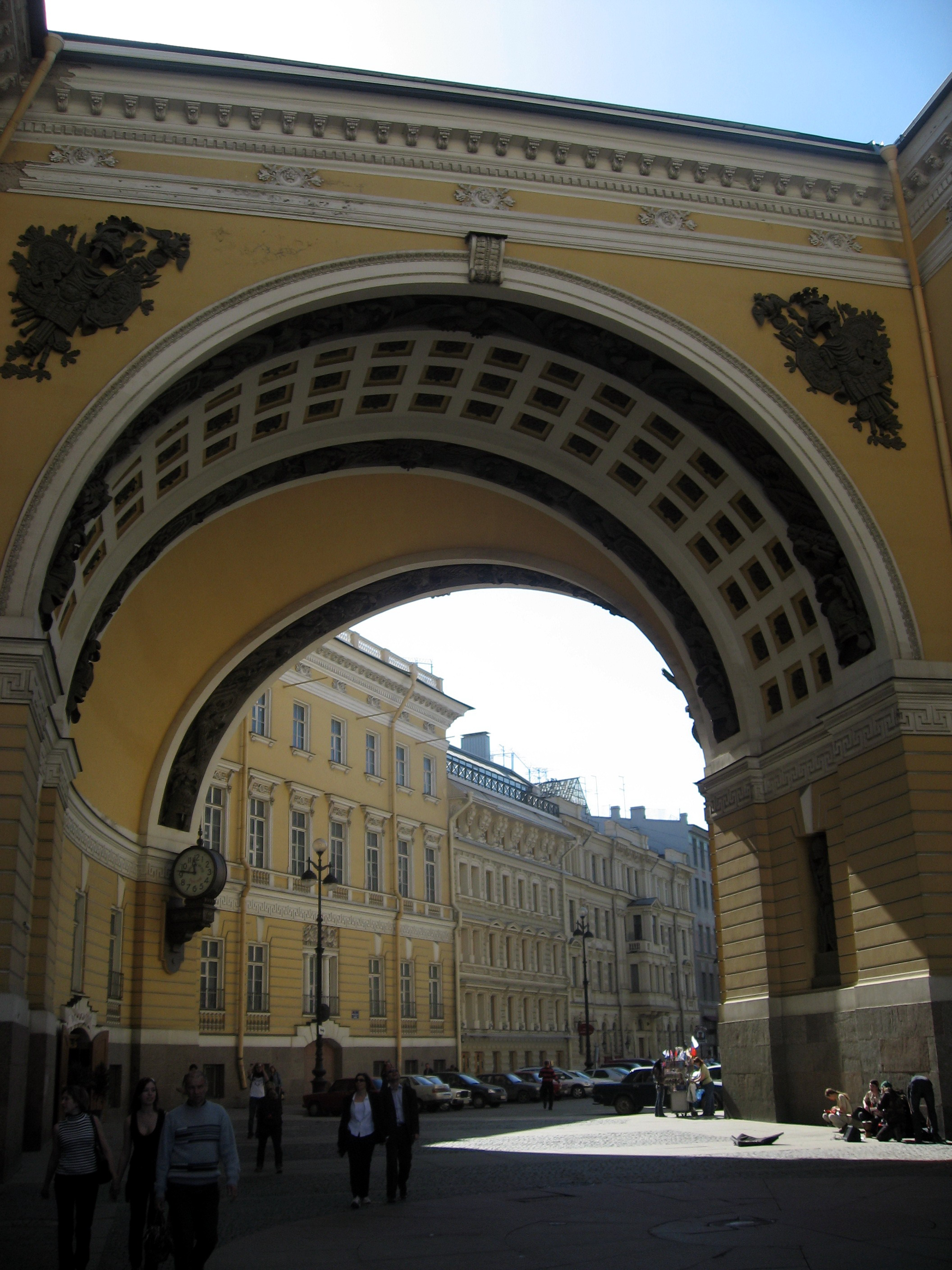
A view through the Arch on Bolshaya Morskaya St. and the building with an ARKA gallery

ARKA Gallery was established in June 2004 by director and owner Eugenia Logvinova (Russian: Евге′ния Ло′гвинова), art historian and curator, a member of International Federation of Artists (IFA), and Art Critics and Art Historians Associations (AIS).

The name of the ARKA was initiated by the nearest neighbourhood with Arch of General Staff Building commemorating the Russian Victory over Napoleon in the Patriotic War of 1812, and also as a sign of special attention to the high traditions of Russian Art. The building was designed by Carlo Rossi in the Empire style and built in 1819-1829.

Since 2005 ARKA Gallery realized more than 100 exhibit projects mostly in Saint Petersburg, but also in Moscow, Tomsk, Novosybirsk, Barnaul. ARKA Gallery carries out joint projects with the major private collections and state museums of Russia. Also gallery hold some international art projects in Saint Petersburg and showed contemporary art from Italy, China, Japan, Ethiopia, Lithuania, and other countries.

Although the ARKA Gallery emphasized the work of living artists, exhibits were not limited to such works - as evidenced by its showing of Paintings of 1940-1980 by the Artists of the Leningrad School of Painting (February – May, 2013), solo exhibitions by artist Vladimir Sakson (2007), as well as the art of such oldest living masters as theatre artist and painter Muza Oleneva-Degtjareva (2007, 2010, 2011) and graphic artist Valentin Blinov.

== Featured Artists ==
- Nikolai Romanov (b. 1957, Russia)
- Evgeny Zhavoronkov (b. 1948, Russia)
- Ugo Baracco (b. 1949, Italy)
- Taisia Afonina (1913-1994, Russia)
- Nikolai Timkov (1912-1993, Russia)
- Alexander Semionov (1922-1984, Russia)
- Vitaly Tulenev (1937-1998, Russia)
- Vsevolod Bazhenov (1909-1986, Russia)
- Elena Skuin (1908-1986, Russia)
- Vladimir Ovchinnikov (1911-1978, Russia)
- Gevork Kotiantz (1906-1996, Russia)
- Evgenia Antipova (1917-2009, Russia)
- Victor Teterin (1922-1991, Russia)
- Sergei Osipov (1915-1985, Russia)
- Alexei Eriomin (1919-1998, Russia)
- Samuil Nevelshtein (1903-1983, Russia)
- Lev Russov (1926-1987, Russia)
- Nikolai Galakhov (b. 1928, Russia)
- Vladimir Sakson (1927-1988, Russia)
- Evgeny Chuprun (1927-2005, Russia)
- Piotr Alberti (1913-1994, Russia)
- Irina Getmanskaya (b. 1939, Russia)
- Vladimir Chekalov (1922-1992, Russia)
- Sergei Van′kov (Russia)

== Editions ==
- Юлия Вальцефер. Живопись. Спб., «АРКА» арт-галерея, 2012
- Николай Романов. Живопись. Спб., «АРКА» арт-галерея, 2012
- Пасхальный калейдоскоп. Часть 2-я. Спб., «АРКА» арт-галерея, 2010
- Ugo Baracco. Venezia. Спб., «АРКА» арт-галерея, 2009
- Валентин Блинов. Графика. Спб., «АРКА» арт-галерея, 2008
- Краски Карнавала. Спб., «АРКА» арт-галерея, 2008
- Николай Романов. Пейзаж. СПб., «АРКА» арт-галерея, 2008
- Старинный Петербург в рисунках Валентина Блинова. Спб., «АРКА» арт-галерея, 2008
- Татьяна Шубина. Железный бестиарий в Петербурге. Спб., «АРКА» арт-галерея, 2008
- Иван Жупан. Живопись, графика. Спб., «АРКА» арт-галерея, 2008
- Евгений Жаворонков. Живопись. Спб., «АРКА» арт-галерея, 2008
- Ольга Ардовская. Объекты из металла. Спб., «АРКА» арт-галерея, 2008
- Пасхальный калейдоскоп. Спб., «АРКА» арт-галерея, 2008
- Седьмой ежегодный фестиваль "Японская весна в Санкт-Петербурге" в галерее АРКА. Спб., «АРКА» арт-галерея, 2007
- Игорь Иванов. Реинкарнация металла. СПб., «АРКА» арт-галерея, 2007
- Владимир Саксон (1927-1988). Живопись. СПб., «АРКА» арт-галерея, 2007
- Жизнь ангелов. Игорь Шаймарданов. Станислав Маткайтис. СПб., «АРКА» арт-галерея, 2007
- Александр Филиппов. Санкт-Петербург. Зима. СПб., «АРКА» арт-галерея, 2007
- Андрей Гонюков. Живопись. СПб., «АРКА» арт-галерея, 2007
- Уго Баракко. Гравюра. СПб., «АРКА» арт-галерея, 2006
- Японская эротическая гравюра. СПб., «АРКА» арт-галерея, 2006
- Олег Гуренков. Живопись. СПб, «АРКА» арт-галерея, 2006
- Игорь Нелюбович. Живопись. СПб., «АРКА» арт-галерея, 2006
- Николай Романов. Пейзаж. СПб., 2006

== Sources ==
- Matthew C. Bown. Dictionary of 20th Century Russian and Soviet Painters 1900-1980s. London, Izomar, 1998.
- Коммерсант, № 134, 24 июля 2004.
- Artindex. Художники`05. Вып.3. T.1. СПб., 2005. С.79-91.
- Янкович К. Из Эфиопии привезли «маскалей» // Смена, 2005, 16 декабря.
- Лисовец М. Осколки чужих небес на фоне белой ночи // Невское время, 2005, 20 мая.
- «Арка» продолжает радовать // Новости Петербурга, 2005, № 24 (400).
- Логвинова Е. Муза и деньги // Free Time, 2006, №1 (92), C.30.
- Логвинова Е. Прогулки по Большой Морской. Азибо – осколки целого мира // Новости Петербурга, 2006, №49 (476).
- Дружинина Е. Берёза сама меня выбрала // Шанс, 2007, № 30, 9 марта.
- Петрова Л. Лопух как символ революции // Невское время, 2007, 15 марта.
- Sergei V. Ivanov. Unknown Socialist Realism. The Leningrad School. Saint Petersburg, NP-Print Edition, 2007.
- Второй Московский международный фестиваль искусств «Традиции и современность». М., 2008. С.154-155.
- Российская газета, 5 июня 2008.
- Северная Пальмира глазами художников // Вечерний Новосибирск, 2008, 28 марта.
- Вечтомова С. В Питере к Пасхе расписали страусиные яйца! // Смена, 2008, 28 апреля.
- Ветров И. Очевидный Петербург // Российская газета, 2008, 30 мая.
- Токмаков В. Белые ночи в Барнауле // Российская газета, 2008, 5 июня.
- Михайлов В. Лайт Металл // Санкт-Петербургские Ведомости, 2009, 7 августа.
- Чердакова Д. Тайна пляшущих человечков // На Невском, 2010, № 6 (161).
