= Shaab =

Shaab (شعب) may refer to:

- Al-Shaab Stadium, a stadium in Baghdad, Iraq
- Al-Shaab CSC, a multi-sports club based in Sharjah, UAE
- Shaab, Armenia, a town in the Kotayk Province of Armenia
- Sha'ab, Baghdad, a neighborhood of Baghdad, Iraq
- Al-Shaab Hadramaut, a football team based in Hadramaut, Yemen
- Al-Shaab Ibb, a football club based in Ibb, Yemen
- Sha'ab, Israel, an Arab town and local council in the Northern District of Israel
