= 1952 in fine arts of the Soviet Union =

Monument to Nikolai Gogol
- Artist: Nikolai Tomsky
- Year: 1952
- Location: Moscow

The year 1952 was marked by many events that left an imprint on the history of Soviet and Russian Fine Arts.

== Events ==
- March 2 — In Moscow on Gogol Boulevard a monument was unveiled to great Russian writer Nikolai Gogol (1809–1852). Authors of the monument sculptor N. Tomsky, architect L. Golubovsky.
- In Leningrad Repin Institute of Arts graduates known in the future artists Marina Kozlovskaya, Boris Korneev, Irina Baldina, Abram Grushko, Boris Lavrenko, Vladimir Chekalov, Piotr Fomin, Oleg Lomakin, Valentin Sidorov, and others.
- November 2 — In Nizhny Novgorod on Gorky Square a monument was unveiled to great Russian writer Maxim Gorky (1868–1936). Authors of the monument sculptor V. Mukhina, architect V. Lebedev and P. Shteller.
- November 5 — The Exhibition of works by Leningrad artists of 1952 was opened in Leningrad in the State Russian Museum. The participants were Vsevolod Bazhenov, Nikolai Baskakov, Piotr Belousov, Piotr Buchkin, Nina Veselova, Rostislav Vovkushevsky, Vladimir Gorb, Vecheslav Zagonek, Ruben Zakharian, Elena Kostenko, Nikolai Kostrov, Anna Kostrova, Boris Lavrenko, Piotr Litvinsky, Oleg Lomakin, Alexander Lubimov, Alexei Mozhaev, Mikhail Natarevich, Sergei Osipov, Alexander Pushnin, Ivan Savenko, Gleb Savinov, Alexander Samokhvalov, Alexander Semionov, Elena Skuin, Ivan Sorokin, Nikolai Timkov, Leonid Tkachenko, Mikhail Tkachev, Yuri Tulin, Rudolf Frentz, Mikhail Chernyshev, Nadezhda Shteinmiller, and other important Leningrad artists.
- In Leningrad on the Theatre Square a monument was unveiled to great Russian musician and composer Nikolai Rimsky-Korsakov (1844–1908). Authors of the monument sculptors V. Bogolubov and Vladimir Ingal.

Monument to Nikolai Rimsky-Korsakov
- Artist: V. Bogolubov, Vladimir Ingal
- Year: 1952
- Location: Saint Petersburg

- November 21 — All-Union Fine Art Exhibition of 1952 opened in Moscow. The participants were Vsevolod Bazhenov, Nikolai Babasuk, Dmitry Belajev, Piotr Buchkin, Nina Veselova, Vecheslav Zagonek, Alexander Pushnin, Sergei Gerasimov, Ivan Savenko, Gleb Savinov, and other important soviet artists.
- November 23 — «Exhibition of Sketch» opened in the Leningrad Union of Artists. The participants were 84 artists, amon them Evgenia Antipova, Evgenia Baykova, Piotr Buchkin, Rostislav Vovkushevsky, Ruben Zakharian, Tatiana Kopnina, Maya Kopitseva, Gevork Kotiantz, Anrdei Mylnikov, Samuil Nevelshtein, Ivan Savenko, Arseny Semionov, Elena Skuin, Victor Teterin, Yuri Tulin, Boris Utekhin, Boris Fogel, Sergei Frolov, Nadezhda Shteinmiller, and other important Leningrad artists.
- Exhibition of works by painter and theatre artist Mikhail Pavlovich Bobyshov (1885 - 1964) opened in the Museum of the Academy of Arts in Leningrad.
- Stalin Prize winner of 1952 in the area of Fine Arts were painter Yuri Neprintsev (for painting «The Rest after Battle», Tretyakov gallery), sculptor Vera Mukhina (posthumously, for monument to Maxim Gorky in Moscow), sculptor Nikolai Tomsky (for marble bust to Nikolai Gogol), sculptor Vasili Vatagin (for sculptural works on animal themes), painters Aleksei Gritsai, Vasily Yefanov, Boris Scherbakov, Konstantin Maksimov (for the series of portraits of soviet scientists).

== Deaths ==
- June 8 — Sergei Merkurov, (Russian: Меркуров Сергей Дмитриевич), Russian soviet sculptor, People's Artist of the USSR, Stalin Prize winner (born 1881).
- August 9 — Olga Della-Vos-Kardovskaya (Russian: Делла-Вос-Кардовская Ольга Людвиговна), Russian soviet painter, wife of Dmitry Kardovsky (born 1875).
- September 20 — Alexander Rusakov (Russian: Русаков Александр Исаакович), Russian soviet painter (born 1898).
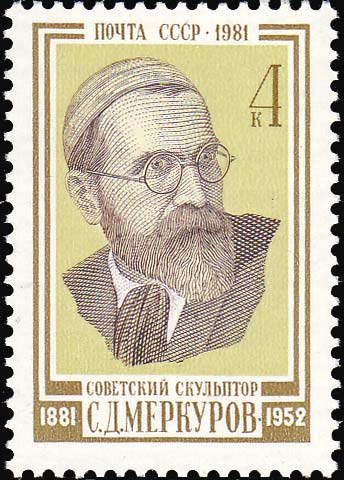
A 1981 Soviet stamp commemorating the 100th anniversary of Sergey Merkurov's birth

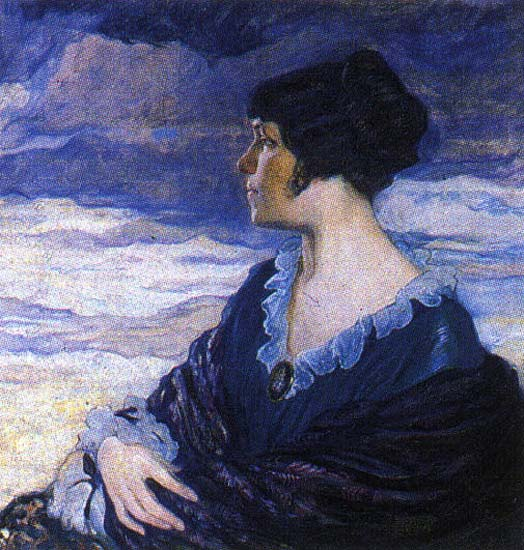
Olga Della-Vos-Kardovskaya

== See also ==
- List of Russian artists
- List of painters of Leningrad Union of Artists
- Saint Petersburg Union of Artists
- Russian culture
- 1952 in the Soviet Union

== Sources ==
- Выставка произведений ленинградских художников 1952 года. Каталог. Л., Лениздат, 1953.
- Всесоюзная художественная выставка 1952 года. Живопись, скульптура, графика. Каталог. М., Государственная Третьяковская галерея, 1952.
- Выставка произведений ленинградских художников. Каталог. Л., Государственный Русский музей, 1952.
- Бобышов Михаил Павлович. Каталог выставки произведений. К 40-летию творческой и 25-летию педагогической деятельности. Л., Музей АХ СССР, 1952.
- Выставка произведений ленинградских художников 1952 года. Каталог. Л., Лениздат, 1953.
- Выставки советского изобразительного искусства. Справочник. Т.4. 1948—1953 годы. М., Советский художник, 1976.
- Artists of Peoples of the USSR. Biography Dictionary. Vol. 1. Moscow, Iskusstvo, 1970.
- Artists of Peoples of the USSR. Biography Dictionary. Vol. 2. Moscow, Iskusstvo, 1972.
- Выставки советского изобразительного искусства. Справочник. Т.4. 1948—1953 годы. М., Советский художник, 1976.
- Directory of Members of Union of Artists of USSR. Volume 1,2. Moscow, Soviet Artist Edition, 1979.
- Directory of Members of the Leningrad branch of the Union of Artists of Russian Federation. Leningrad, Khudozhnik RSFSR, 1980.
- Artists of Peoples of the USSR. Biography Dictionary. Vol. 4 Book 1. Moscow, Iskusstvo, 1983.
- Directory of Members of the Leningrad branch of the Union of Artists of Russian Federation. - Leningrad: Khudozhnik RSFSR, 1987.
- Artists of peoples of the USSR. Biography Dictionary. Vol. 4 Book 2. - Saint Petersburg: Academic project humanitarian agency, 1995.
- Link of Times: 1932 - 1997. Artists - Members of Saint Petersburg Union of Artists of Russia. Exhibition catalogue. - Saint Petersburg: Manezh Central Exhibition Hall, 1997.
- Matthew C. Bown. Dictionary of 20th Century Russian and Soviet Painters 1900-1980s. London, Izomar, 1998.
- Vern G. Swanson. Soviet Impressionism. Woodbridge, England, Antique Collectors' Club, 2001.
- Время перемен. Искусство 1960—1985 в Советском Союзе. СПб., Государственный Русский музей, 2006.
- Sergei V. Ivanov. Unknown Socialist Realism. The Leningrad School. Saint-Petersburg, NP-Print Edition, 2007. ISBN 5-901724-21-6, ISBN 978-5-901724-21-7.
- Anniversary Directory graduates of Saint Petersburg State Academic Institute of Painting, Sculpture, and Architecture named after Ilya Repin, Russian Academy of Arts. 1915 - 2005. Saint Petersburg: Pervotsvet Publishing House, 2007.
