= Efrem Zverkov =

Efrem Ivanovich Zverkov (1921-2012) was a Soviet/Russian painter, recipient of the Ilya Repin State Prize of the RSFSR. He was educated at the Moscow Surikov State Academic Institute of Fine Arts under Vasily Yefanov and at the Russian Academy of Arts under Nikolay Yakovlevich Borisov. His paintings include Work on a Collective Farm, Teacher's Jubilee (1954), Back from a Business Trip (1956), Morning in a Moscow Suburb (1962). He received the Order "For Merit to the Fatherland" (4th class), the Order of Honour, and the Order of the Red Banner of Labour.
