= 1952 in the Soviet Union =

- Decades: 1930s; 1940s; 1950s; 1960s; 1970s
- See also: History of the Soviet Union; List of years in the Soviet Union

The following lists events that happened during 1952 in the Union of Soviet Socialist Republics.

== Incumbents ==
- General Secretary of the Communist Party of the Soviet Union — Joseph Stalin (until 16 October)
- Chairman of the Presidium of the Supreme Soviet of the Soviet Union — Nikolay Shvernik
- Chairman of the Council of Ministers of the Soviet Union — Joseph Stalin

== Events ==
- Mingrelian Affair
- Doctors' plot: A group of prominent Moscow doctors, mostly Jewish, is falsely accused of conspiring to assassinate Soviet leaders.

=== June ===
- June 13 — Catalina affair: Two Swedish aircraft are shot down by Soviet fighter jets over the Baltic.

=== August ===
- August 12 — Night of the Murdered Poets: Thirteen Soviet Jews are executed on false charges.

=== October ===
- October 5–14 — The 19th Congress of the Communist Party of the Soviet Union is held.

=== November ===
- November 5 — The 1952 Severo-Kurilsk tsunami kills 2,336 people in the town of Severo-Kurilsk.

=== December ===
- December 15 — The Shch class submarine S-117 is lost due to unknown causes.

== Births ==
- January 1
  - Nikolay Dudov, 3rd Governor of Magadan Oblast
  - Yury Zacharanka, 2nd Minister of Internal Affairs of Belarus (d. 1999)
- January 2
  - Elvira Saadi, gymnast
  - Indulis Emsis, 18th Prime Minister of Latvia
- January 19 – Tatyana Komarova, Soviet and Russian journalist (d. 2010)
- January 30
  - Valery Khalilov, Russian military band conductor (d. 2016)
  - Anatoly Yefremov, 2nd Governor of Arkhangelsk Oblast (d. 2009)
- February 15 — Nikolai Sorokin, Russian theatre and film actor (d. 2013)
- February 21 — Vitaly Churkin, Russian diplomat (d. 2017)
- February 23 — Oleg Korolyov, 3rd Governor of Lipetsk Oblast
- February 27 — Yuri Shafranik, 3rd Minister of Energy of Russia
- March 2 — Sergei Stepashin, 5th Prime Minister of Russia
- March 9 — Konstantin Tolstoshein, Acting Governor of Primorsky Krai
- March 18 — Yuriy Vynnychuk, Ukrainian journalist, writer and editor
- March 23 — Antonina Dvoryanets, Ukrainian hydraulic engineer and political activist (d. 2014)
- March 27 — Akejan Kajegeldin, 2nd Prime Minister of Kazakhstan
- April 25 — Vladislav Tretiak, Russian ice hockey player
- May 3 — Leonid Khachiyan, Soviet and American mathematician (d. 2005)
- May 4 — Semyon Zubakin, 3rd Head of the Altai Republic
- May 5 — Anatoly Artamonov, 4th Governor of Kaluga Oblast
- May 18 — Yury Komarovsky, 1st Governor of Nenets Autonomous Okrug
- June 14 — Robert Lepikson, 9th Minister of the Interior of Estonia (d. 2006)
- July 14 — Nikolay Poluyanov, 1st Governor of Komi-Permyak Autonomous Okrug
- August 1 — Petro Symonenko, Ukrainian politician
- August 20 — Sergey Chemezov, CEO of Rostec
- September 12 — Sergey Karaganov, Russian political scientist
- October 5 — Emomali Rahmon, 3rd President of Tajikistan
- October 7
  - Vladimir Putin, 2nd and 4th President of Russia
  - Ludmilla Tourischeva, gymnast
- October 14 — Nikolai Andrianov, Soviet and Russian gymnast (d. 2011)
- October 19 — Mykhailo Yezhel, 10th Minister of Defence of Ukraine
- November 5 — Oleg Blokhin, Soviet and Ukrainian football player and manager
- December 29 — Külliki Saldre, Estonian actress

== Deaths ==
- March 9 — Alexandra Kollontai, revolutionary, politician, diplomat and Marxist theoretician (b. 1872)
- March 15 — Mikhail Doller, film director (b. 1889)
- April 15 — Viktor Chernov, revolutionary and one of the founders of the Russian Socialist Revolutionary Party (b. 1873)
- May 2 — Matrona Nikonova, Orthodox nun and saint (b. 1881)
- June 8 — Sergey Merkurov, sculptor (b. 1881)
- August 12 — Peretz Markish, poet (b. 1895)
- September 15 — Hugo Raudsepp, playwright (b. 1883)

== See also ==
- 1952 in fine arts of the Soviet Union
- List of Soviet films of 1952
