= Seyran Valiyev =

Seyran Suleyman oglu Valiyev (16 December 1950 – 1 August 2013) was an Azerbaijani paleogeographer and historian. A Doctor of Geographical Sciences, he was senior research fellow at the ANAS Institute of Geography and a member of the Azerbaijan Writers' Union. Valiyev authored several books and over 600 articles on Azerbaijani history and paleogeography.

== Life ==
Seyran Valiyev was born in Bodaybo, Russia, in the family of Azerbaijani writer Suleyman Valiyev, who was exiled there under Stalin. In 1955, Valiyev moved to Baku with his family. In 1973, he graduated from the Faculty of Geography of Azerbaijan State University.

Valiyev completed an internship in Moscow at the Institute of Geography of the USSR Academy of Sciences. He conducted extensive research on the paleogeographic conditions of the Azerbaijani territory and the Caspian Sea in the Quaternary, the settlement of Paleolithic people in the Azykh Cave, the level fluctuations of the Caspian Sea, and the climatic changes of the Azerbaijani territory in the Quaternary. Following these studies, in 1994 he defended his doctoral thesis "Paleogeography of Azerbaijan and Adjacent Territories in the Late Pleistocene and Holocene".

Valiyev held the view that Baku is older than it was commonly believed, citing Herodotus' description of the Caspian Sea in the Histories as one of the examples. Valiyev elaborated his views about Baku in several publications. In the article "Where Was Ancient Baku?" Valiyev offered indirect evidence for the city's pre-8th century existence, such as depressions and pits on a rock in the Palace of the Shirvanshahs, an ancient cemetery near Murtuza Mukhtarov Street and data from Herodotus and Ptolemy.

In 1996, Valiyev became a member of the Azerbaijan Writers' Union.
