= Ramana, Azerbaijan =

Ramana
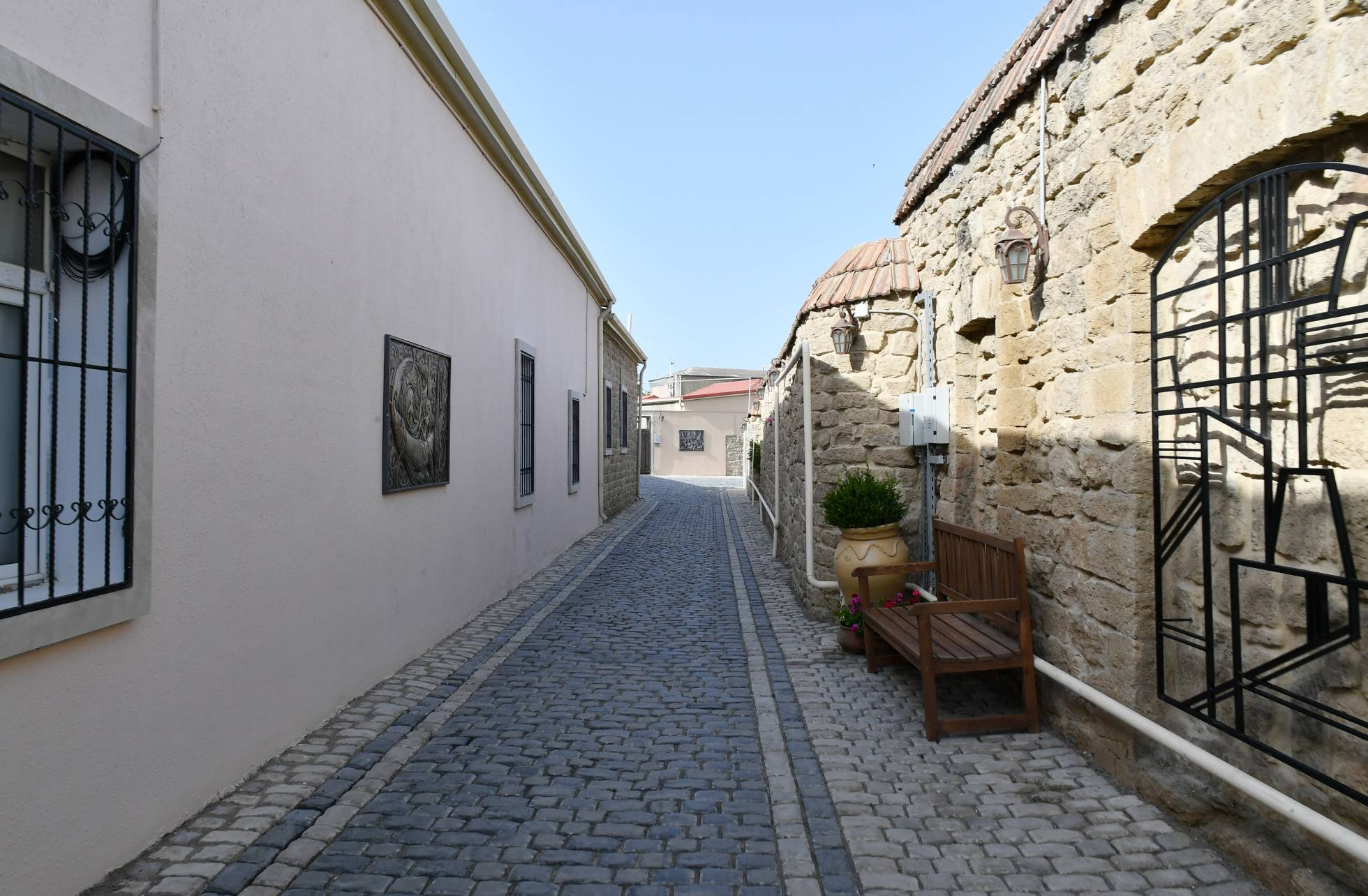
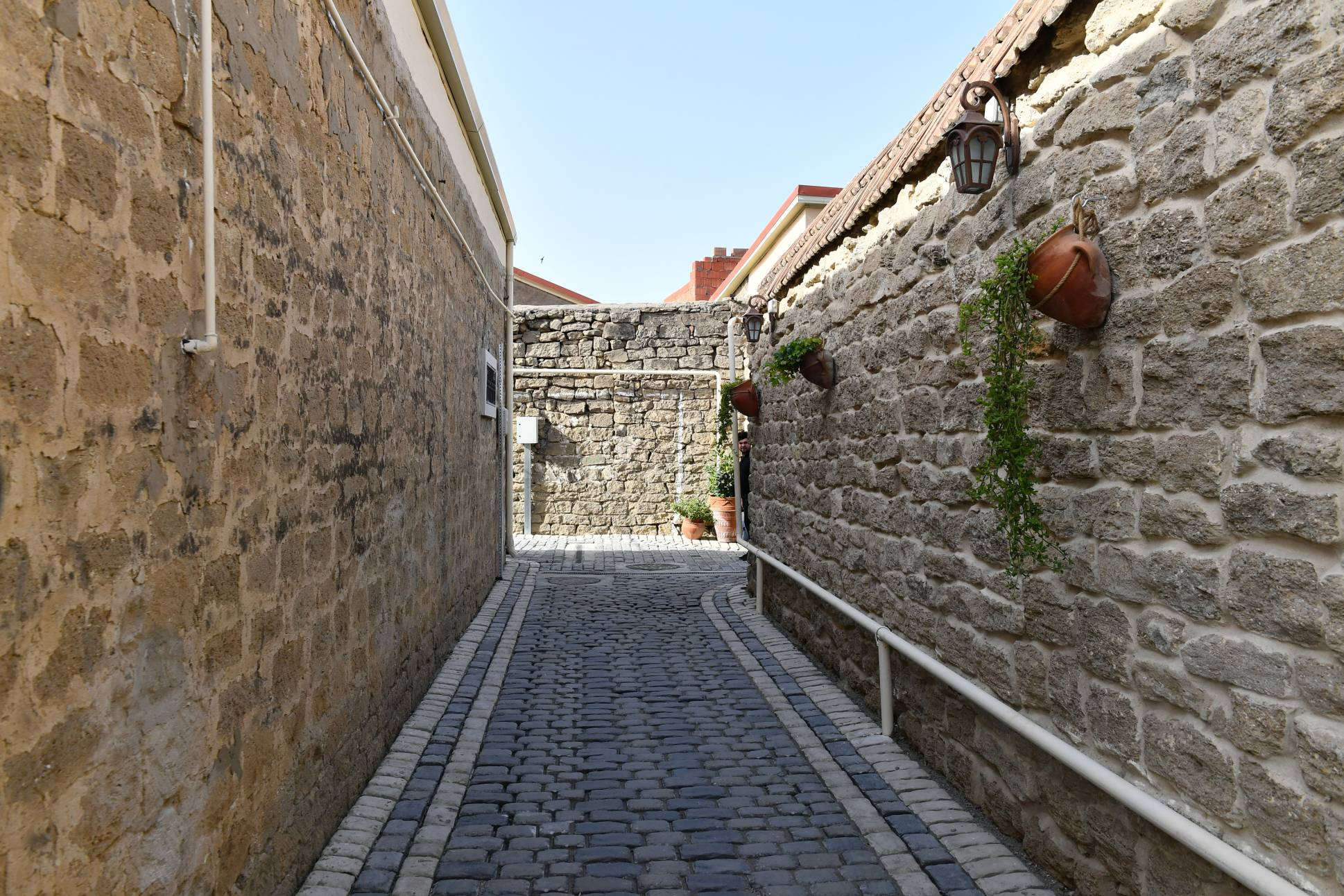
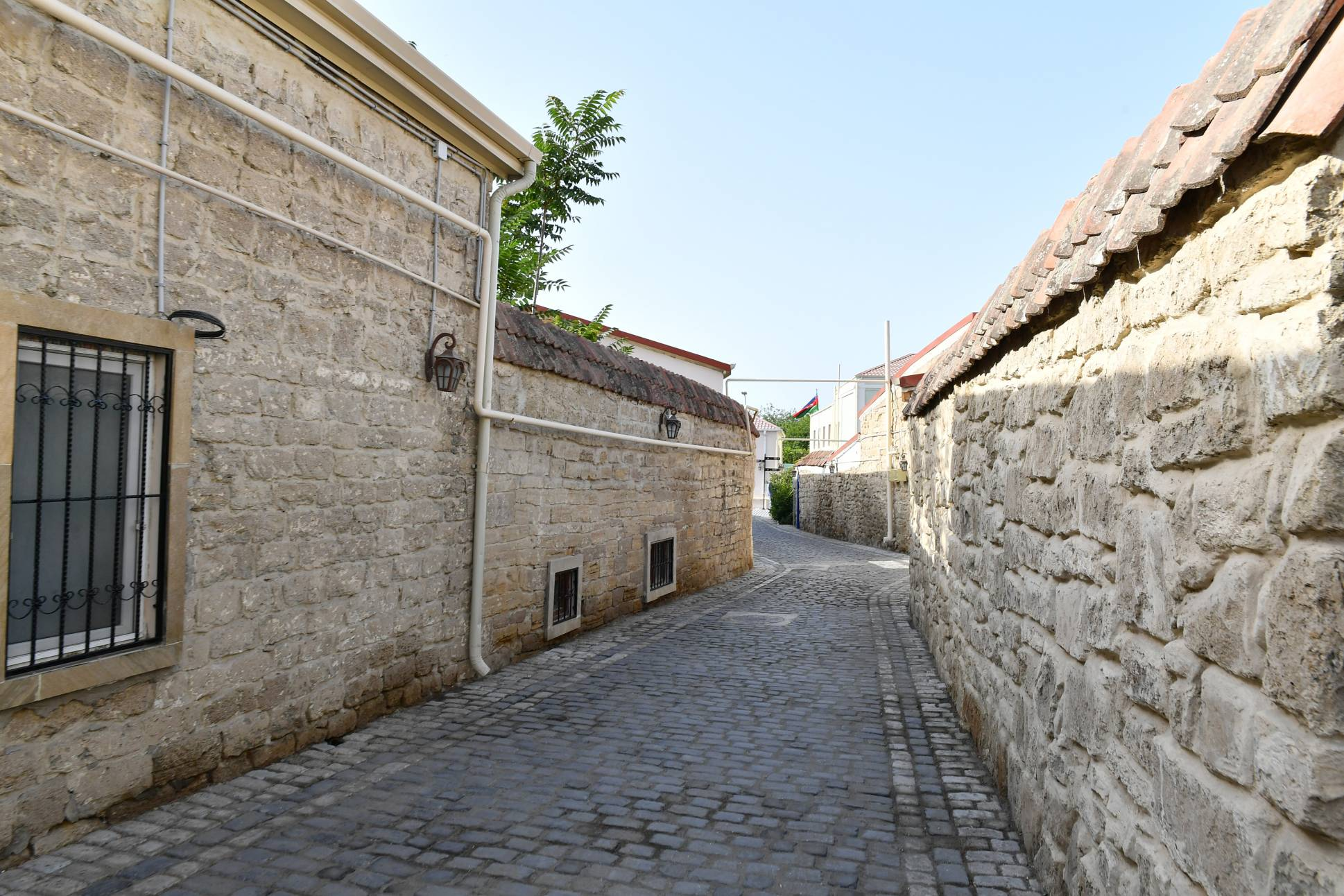
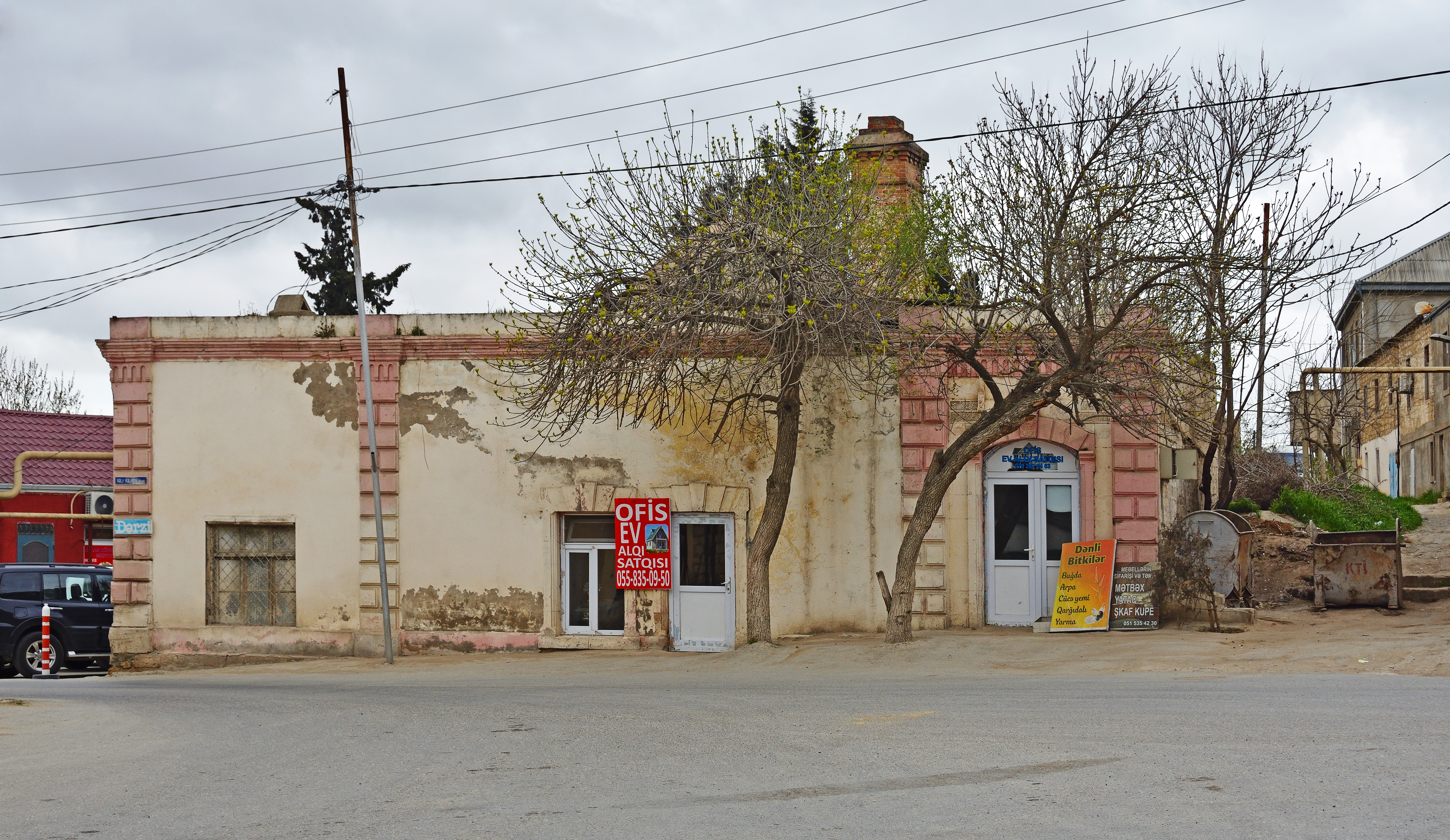
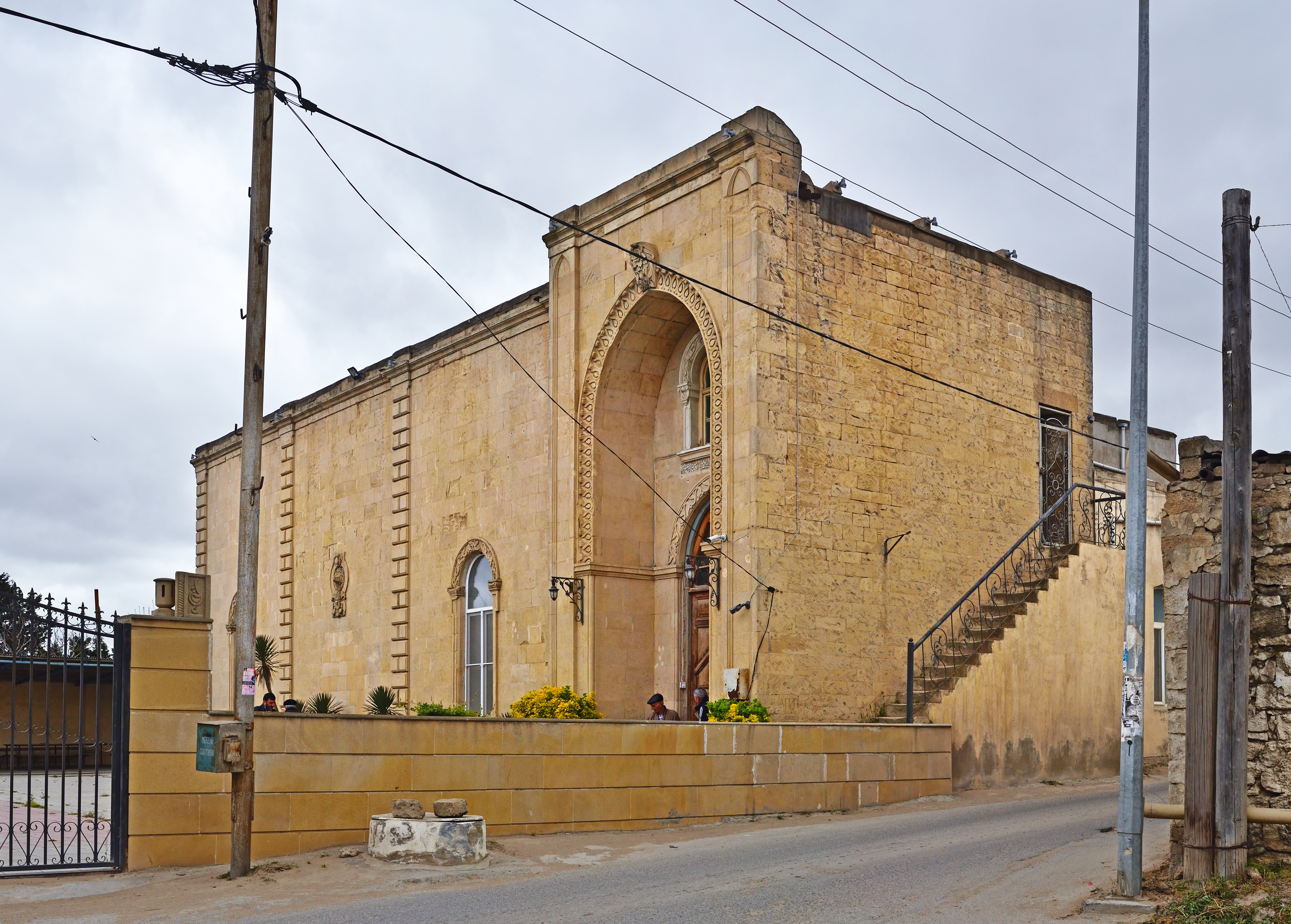
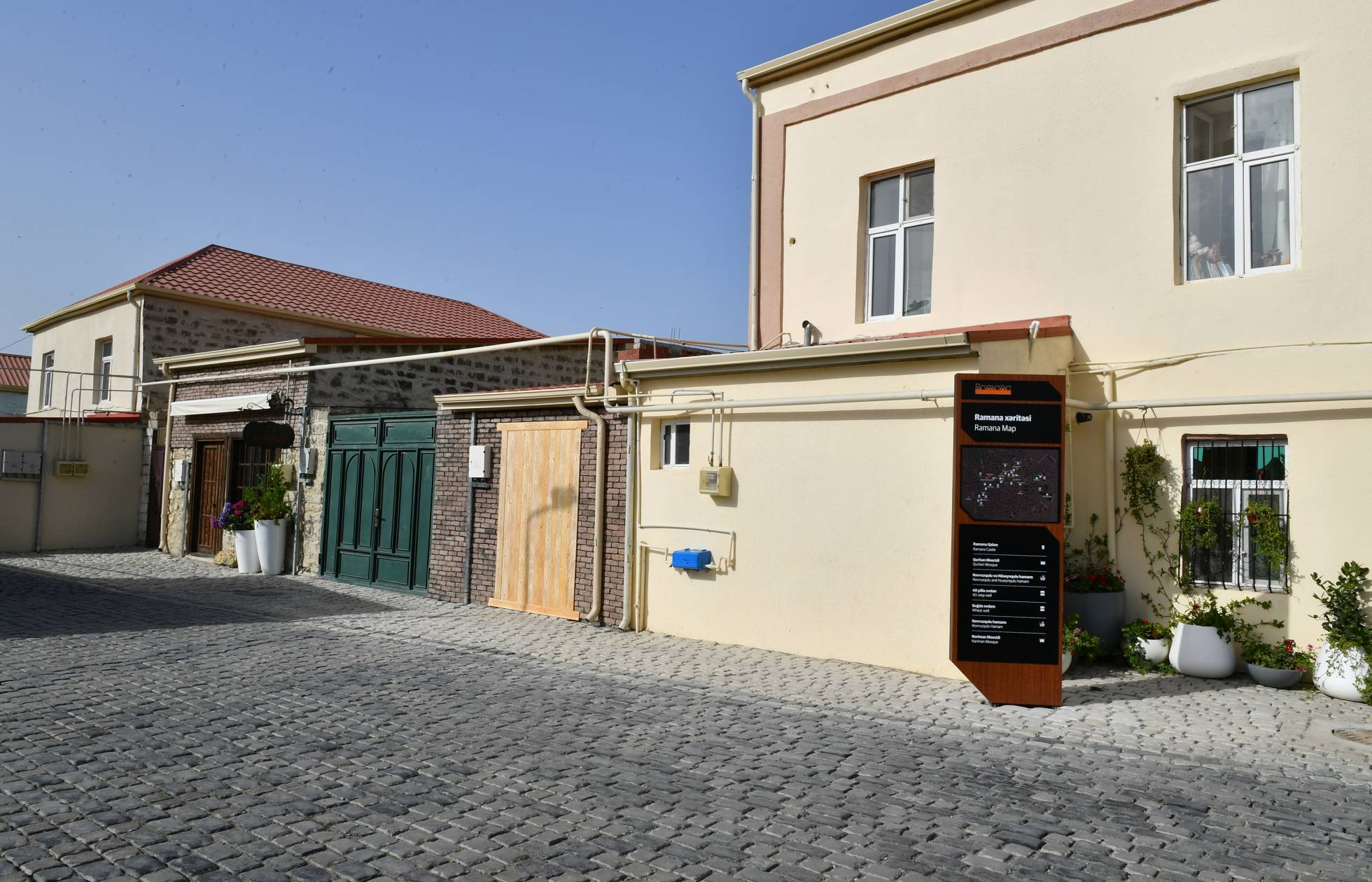
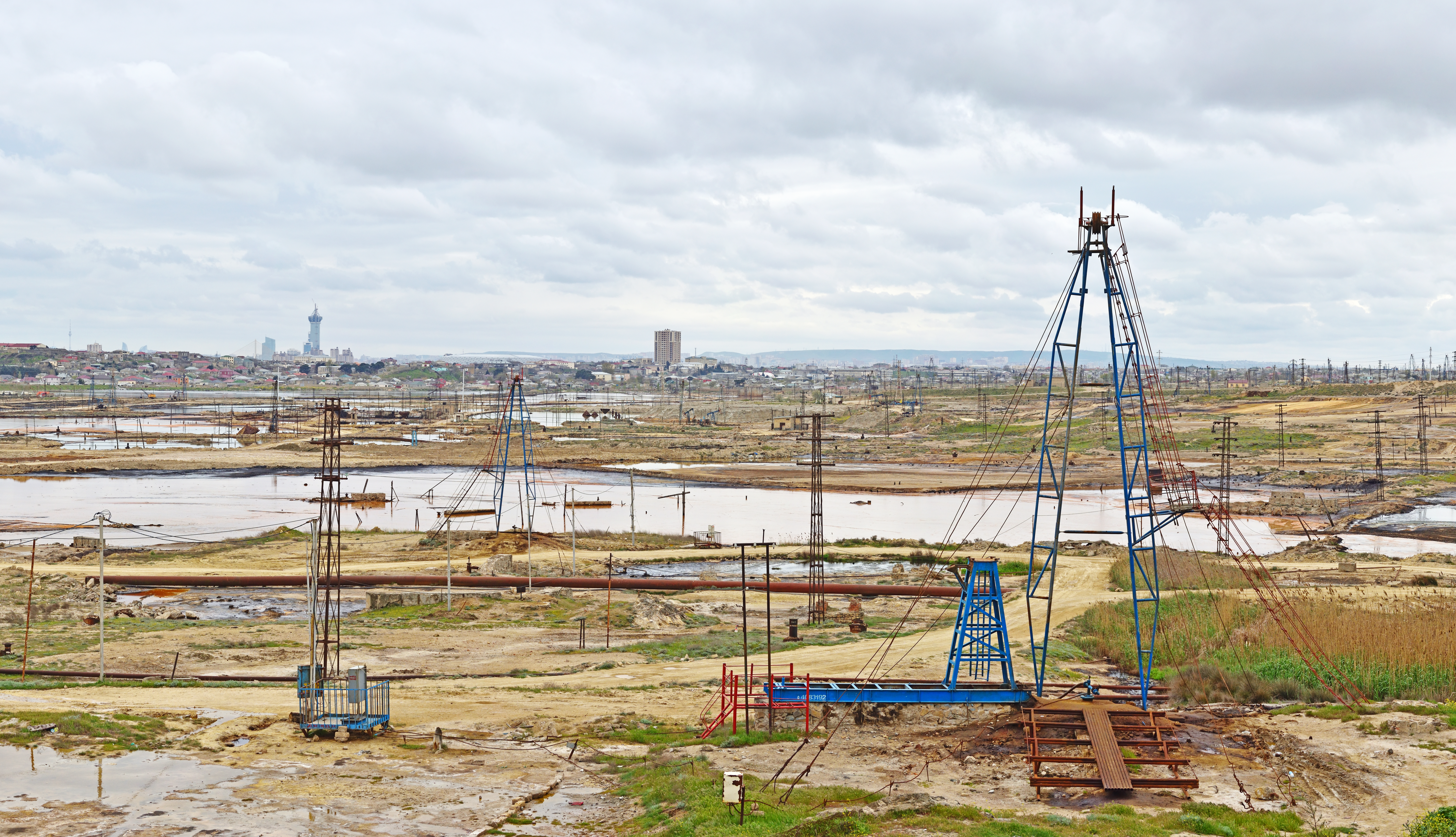

- Location within Azerbaijan
- Coordinates: 40°27′29″N 49°59′05″E
- Country: Azerbaijan
- City: Baku

Population
  - Total: 13,000
- Time zone: UTC+4 (AZT)
  - Summer (DST): UTC+5 (AZT)

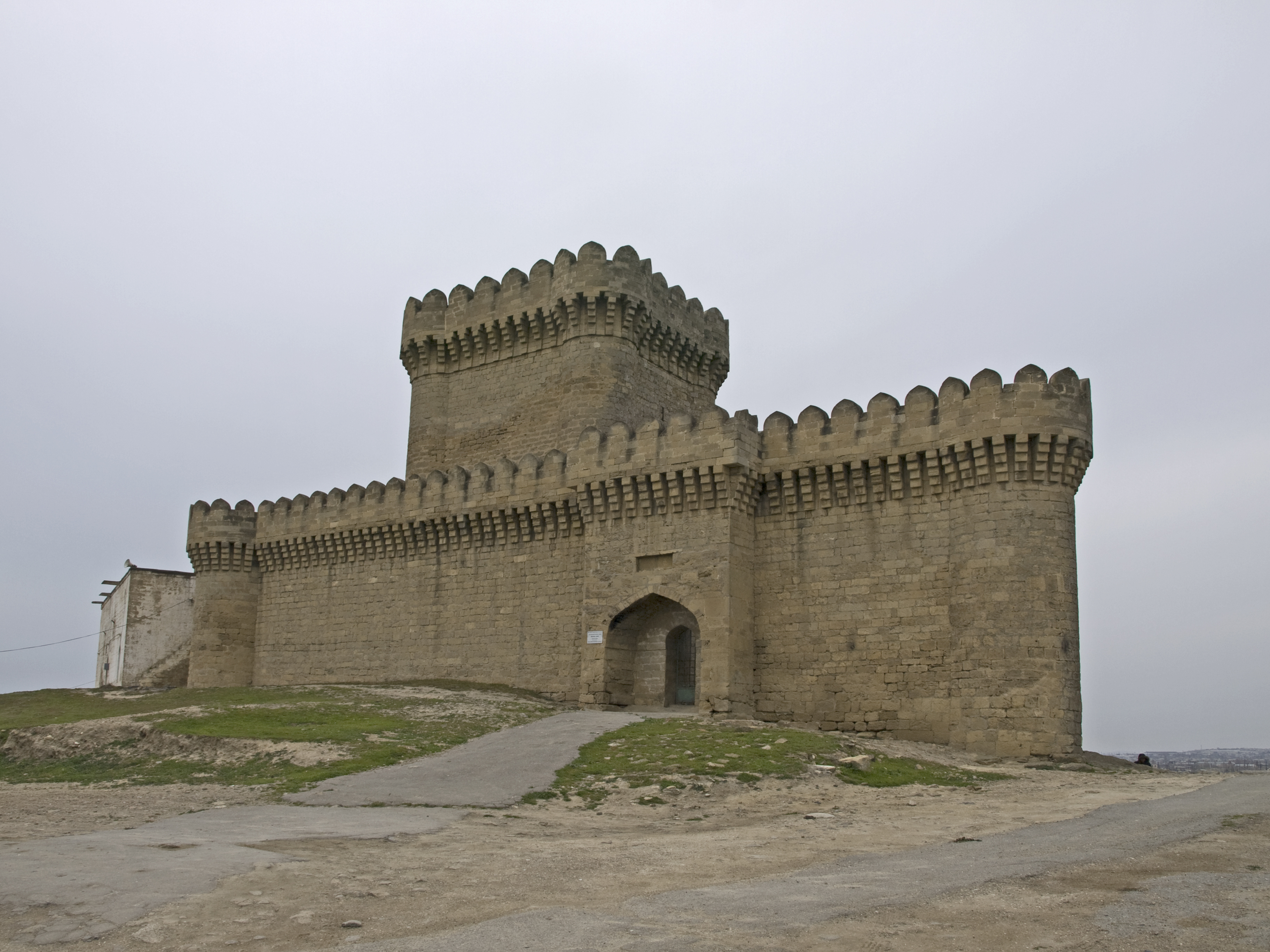
Ramana Tower

Ramana also spelled Ramany, Romana (Azerbaijani: Ramana, Ramanı), is an urban-type settlement and municipality in Azerbaijan, within the Sabunchu raion of Baku. Population (2005): 8,800.

The settlement was possibly founded by the Roman troops of Lucius Julius Maximus from Legio XII Fulminata in c. 84-96 AD, and may derive its name from the Latin Romana. Among the facts that strengthen this hypothesis are the military-topographical map of Caucasus published in 1903 by the Russian administration which spells name of town as "Romana"; various Roman artefacts found in Absheron region, and also old inhabitants' referring to the town as Romani.

Famous Azerbaijani jazz musician Vagif Mustafazadeh had Ramanian roots. Ramana is mentioned several times in the novels The Nodes and The Moustached Aga by the Azeri writer Suleyman Veliyev who is himself from Ramana. The second work describes another feature of the settlement, a big reservoir, which is called "the settlement's beacon" due to its height (18 m). The reservoir supplied water to the oil fields in Zagulba, Zabrat and Balakhany. In the Balakhany-Sabunchi-Ramana oil field, a new technology for identification of oil thin layers was originally tested. A route connects Ramana with the Heydar Aliyev International Airport.

Local landmarks include the four-storeyed castle of the mid-14th century and the mosque of 1323. The castle has a 1.5 m thick walls and a rectangular tower (9x7.5 m, height: 13 m).

In May 2007, a new district opened within Ramana for the housing of more than 50 families and 400 other internally displaced persons from other regions of Azerbaijan. The resettlement area includes a new school for 360 pupils and other administrative buildings as well as a music school.

== Gallery ==
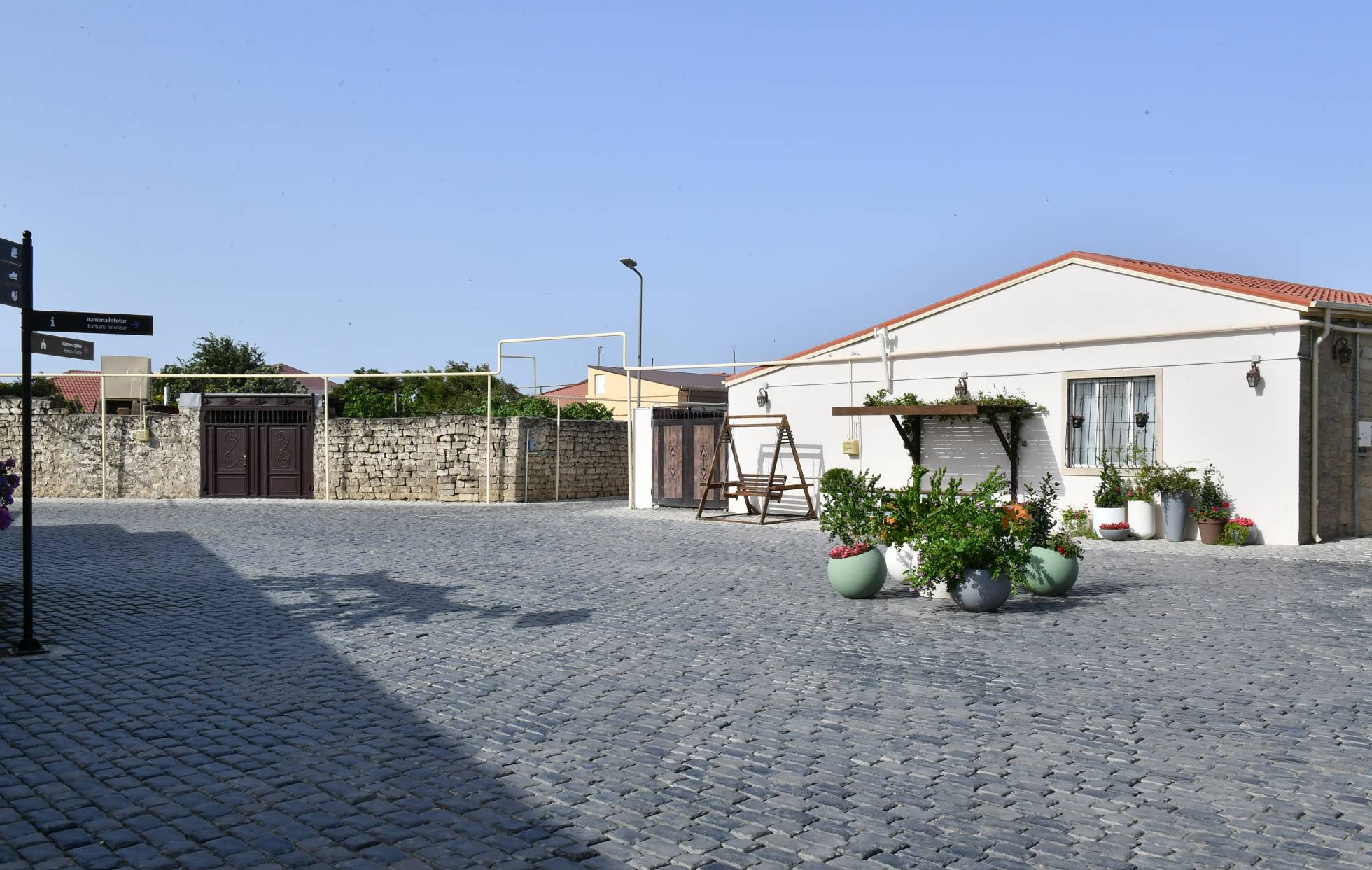
Street in Ramana

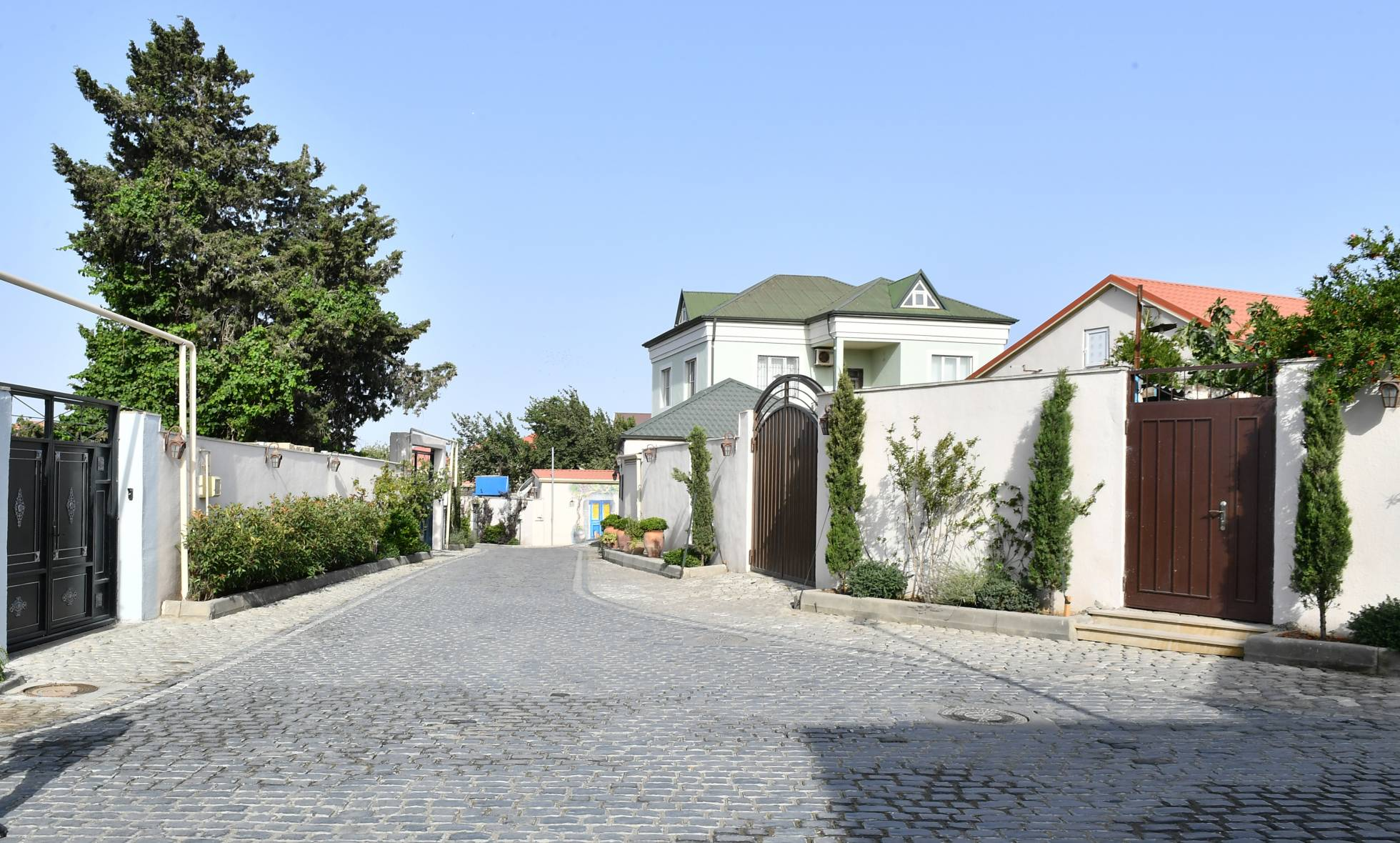
Houses in Ramana
