= Ramana Tower =

Coordinates: 40°27′22″N 49°58′48″E

- Ramana qalası برج رامانا
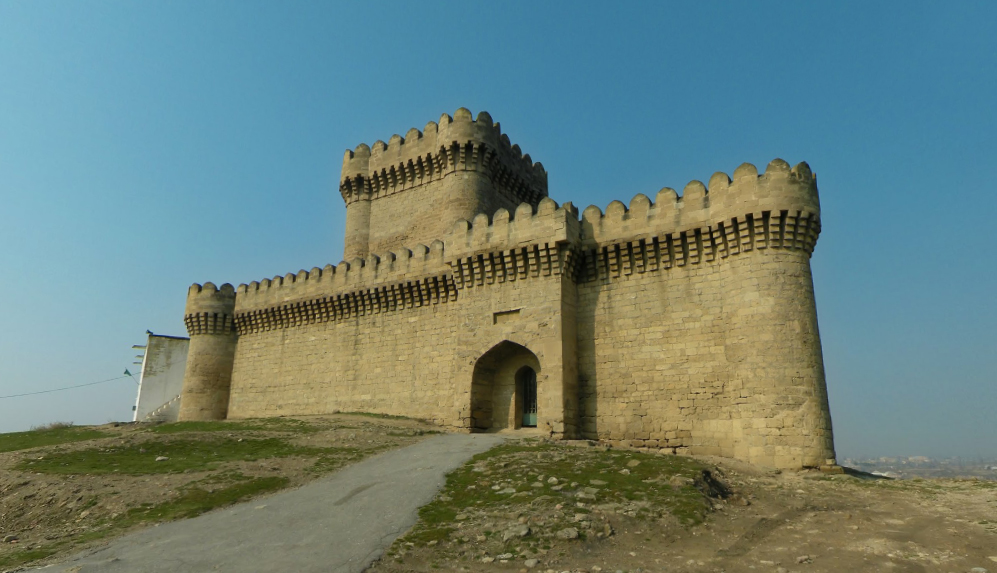
- Interactive map of Ramana Tower
- Location: Baku, Azerbaijan
- Beginning date: 12th century

Ramana Tower (Azerbaijani: Ramana qalası, Persian: برج رامانا) – is a historical architectural monument located in the Ramana village of the Sabunchu district in Baku. The palace has been registered as a monument of global significance by the Ministry of Culture of Azerbaijan Republic. In 2001, along with other defensive structures of the Absheron Peninsula, Ramana Fortress was included in.

Built by order of the Iranian Shirvanshahs, the palace dates back to the 14th century according to historical records. Some researchers, however, suggest that the construction of the palace may belong to the 12th century.

The internal courtyard of the palace measures 28x10 meters. Its external walls are fortified with rounded corner towers placed along the walls. The entrance to Ramana Fortress is situated within a defensive courtyard. Unlike the characteristic three-tiered shape for circular towers, the square-shaped tower of Ramana Palace is divided into four tiers.

== History ==
The castle was possibly built under the order of the Shirvanshahs in the 14th century, perhaps for defensive purposes. Some researchers claim that the remaining structure was constructed during the Nizami period (12th century).

Primarily, the construction of the Absheron fortresses, initiated from the 12th century, were interconnected. Also, the fact that these fortresses were predominantly built on the northeastern shores, specifically in the northern and northeastern villages of Baku, indicated that the main direction of the threat came from that direction. The first castle, spotting strange ships on the shore, would signal danger at night with bonfires and during the day by producing smoke, relaying the warning to another castle, which, in turn, would communicate it to yet another fortress. Consequently, the entire Absheron region, including the central Baku castle, would be alerted. Some historians have previously claimed the existence of underground passages connecting all the fortresses, generally leading to another castle, specifically the Baku castle, including the Maiden Tower.

== Architectural features ==
The sides of the castle's inner courtyard measure 28x10 meters. Its external walls are fortified with semicircular turrets placed at intervals along the wall and made of bricks. The distance between these turrets does not exceed 10–11 meters, which differs from the generally accepted distance in the construction of defensive structures up to the 14th century. It's likely that the intention behind reducing the distance between these architectural turrets, closer to the castle's external walls, was to ensure the defense of areas near the external walls with crossbow fire.

The defensive structures in Absheron during the 13th to 14th centuries didn't always facilitate defense right at the base of the walls. Sometimes the turrets (even the corner turrets) were reduced in size, similar to what is seen in Ramana castle. Therefore, defense along the base of the wall was organized through a series of evenly placed chambers along the entire length of the external walls.

The entrance of the Ramana castle features a defense courtyard. According to L. Mamikonov, this gate in an arrow-like mountain ridge shape was added later to the castle.

Unlike the characteristic three-tiered form for circular towers, the square tower of Ramana castle is divided into four tiers. The living space within the tower measures 83 square meters. Only the first and topmost tiers have roofs formed in the shape of an arrow-like mountain ridge. The roofs of the other tiers are flat, constructed with wooden beams.

The addition of semicircular towers on four sides of the donjon, on the one hand, influenced its architectural features and gave it a more solid character, thus allowing to increase the height of the building, and on the other hand, it created conditions for a more efficient organization of the defense of the tower walls.

== In film ==
Ramana Fortress has been used as a filming location for movies like "Koroghlu," "Nasimi," and "Babekh." The fortress underwent restoration during the filming of "Koroghlu" in 1956 when it was in a dilapidated state. Historians have noted the existence of an underground passage from Ramana Fortress to Maiden Tower and Bakikhanov village in the past.

While an initially inconspicuous large rock-like stone on the hillside next to the fortress walls might not immediately catch one's eye, it holds a charming anecdote in its own right: It's said that the nightingale sang Koroghlu's melody right beside this stone. Locals who visit the village and historical sites often present this large stone in this particular context to anyone exploring these historic landmarks.
