= Hasanaga Sadigov =

Azerbaijani ashik musician (1950–2018)

Hasanaga Sadigov Həsənağa Sadıqov
- Born: 7 December 1950; Salyan, Azerbaijan SSR, Soviet Union
- Died: 1 August 2018 (aged 67) Baku, Azerbaijan
- Genres: Azeri music
- Instruments: Bağlama, Naqareh, Balaban

Hasanaga Sadigov (7 December 1950 – 1 August 2018) was an Azerbaijani ashik musician.

Sadigov's father and grandfather were one of the connoisseurs of national ashik art. His father, Ashug Gurbankhan, is one of the most famous singers in the Mughan region. He has been educated by Mirza Bilal, a prominent Azerbaijani artist. As a child, he went to weddings with his father and grandfather to perform different musical instruments. He graduated from secondary school in Salyan city in 1968.

In 1963, his first recording tape came out in Baku and became popular with songs and rhythms played with drums. He also gave a special impetus to the theoretical profession as a talented musician. He graduated from the Azerbaijan State University of Culture and Arts in 1986 with a degree in "Cultural and Maritime Affairs." In 1986, he participated in the World Music Festival and received a profound sympathy of the jury and spectators and was awarded the Golden Medal of the festival. Sadigov performed in the United States, Norway, Vietnam, Germany, as well as in many African countries. In 1988, Sadigov was awarded the honorary title of Honoured Culture Worker of the Azerbaijan SSR.

== Death ==
Sadigov died on 1 August 2018 from cancer at the age of 67.
