= Suleyman Valiyev =

Suleyman Valiyev (Azerbaijani: Süleyman Vəliyev; 1916, Absheron, Ramana – 1996 Baku) was an Azerbaijani writer.
