= Nikolai Romanov (artist) =

Russian and Soviet painter (born 1957)

- Born: Nikolai Alexandrovich Romanov; 12 May 1957 (age 69); Pushkin, Leningrad Oblast, Soviet Union
- Education: Repin Institute of Arts
- Known for: Painting

Nikolai Alexandrovich Romanov (Russian: Никола́й Алекса́ндрович Рома́нов, 12 May 1957, Pushkin town near Leningrad) is a Russian and Soviet painter, who lives and works in Saint Petersburg.

== Biography ==
Nikolai Alexandrovich Romanov was born on 12 May 1957 in Pushkin near Leningrad. In 1980 he graduated from Art College after Vladimir Serov in Leningrad.

In 1987 Nikolai Romanov graduated from department of painting of Repin Institute of Arts with Silver Medal, pupil of Evsey Moiseenko.

Since 1985 Romanov had participated in Art Exhibitions, mostly as a master of lyrical landscape. He worked in technique of oil painting, tempera, pastel, watercolors, and pencil drawing. In 1990 he was admitted to the Leningrad Union of Soviet Artists.

Nikolai Romanov is a winner of Silver Medal of the Academy of Art (1987), Silver (2008) and Gold Medal (2012) ″For the Contribution to Domestic Culture″ of the International Federation of Artists. Romanov is one of two Russian artists who was invited to participation in Festival, to the devoted 100 Anniversary of the Fauvism in 2007 (Collioure, France).

Paintings of Nikolai Romanov reside in the Art museum of Academy of Arts in Saint Petersburg, State Art Museum of Novosibirsk, in Palace of Arts of Perpignan (France), Museum of Art in Cambrai (France), in Ivanovo Regional Art Museum, as well as in private collections in Russia, Italy, China, Cyprus, Norway, Korea, US, Germany, Sweden, Spain, New Zealand, Australia, Greece, Chili, Austria, UK and other countries.

== Awards ==
- Silver Medal of Repin Academy of Art (Saint Petersburg, 1987)
- Silver Medal "For the Contribution to Domestic Culture" of the International Federation of Artists (2008)
- Gold Medal "For the Contribution to Domestic Culture" of the International Federation of Artists (2012)

== See also ==
- Leningrad School of Painting
- Saint Petersburg Union of Artists

== Gallery ==
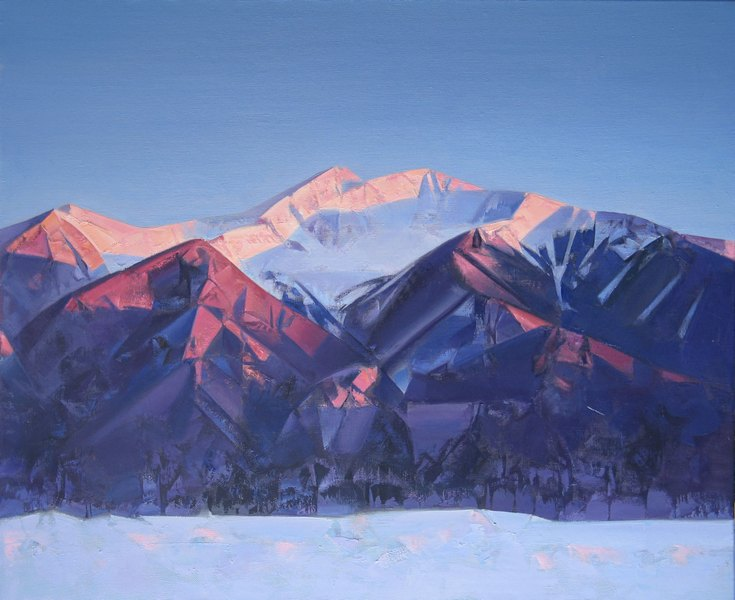
Nikolai Romanov.
Evening in Sayan Mountains. 2015

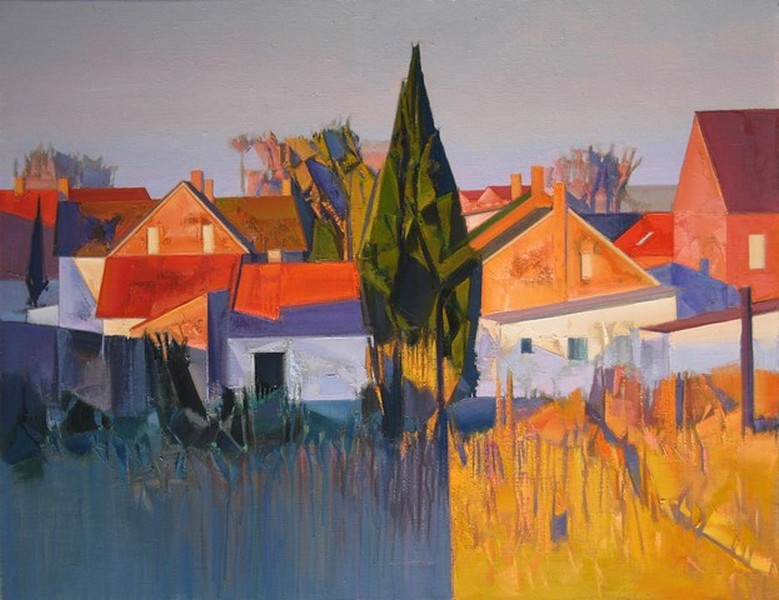
Nikolai Romanov.
France. Cambre. 2012

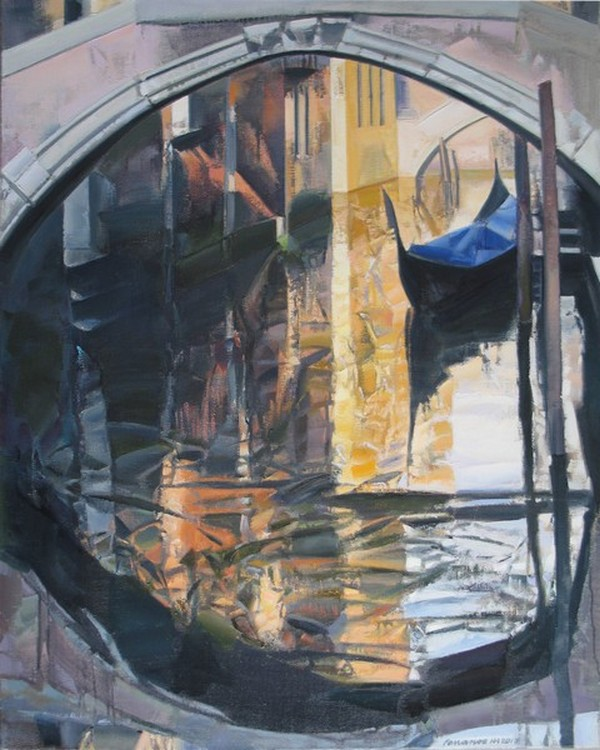
Nikolai Romanov.
Water without time. 2013

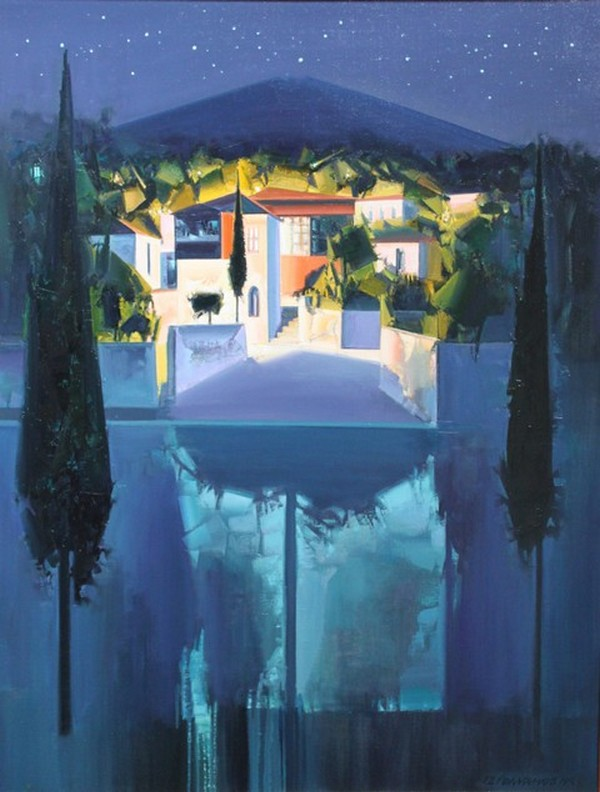
Nikolai Romanov.
Night Fragrance of Vanilla. 2012

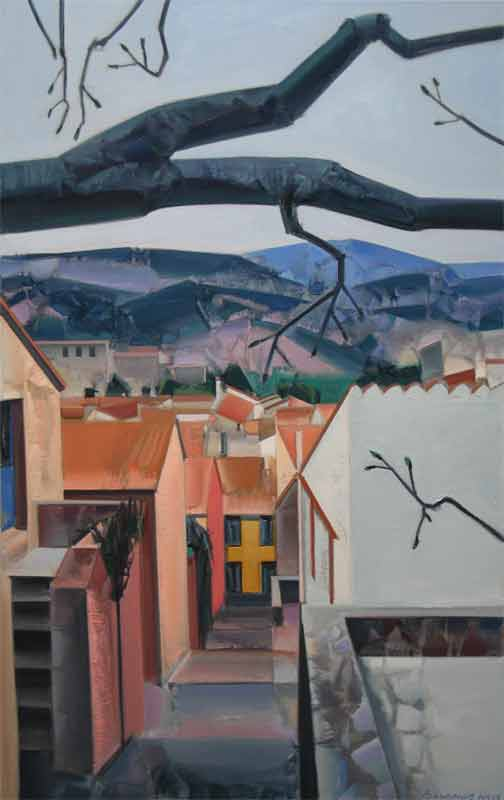
Nikolai Romanov.
March in Collioure. 2011

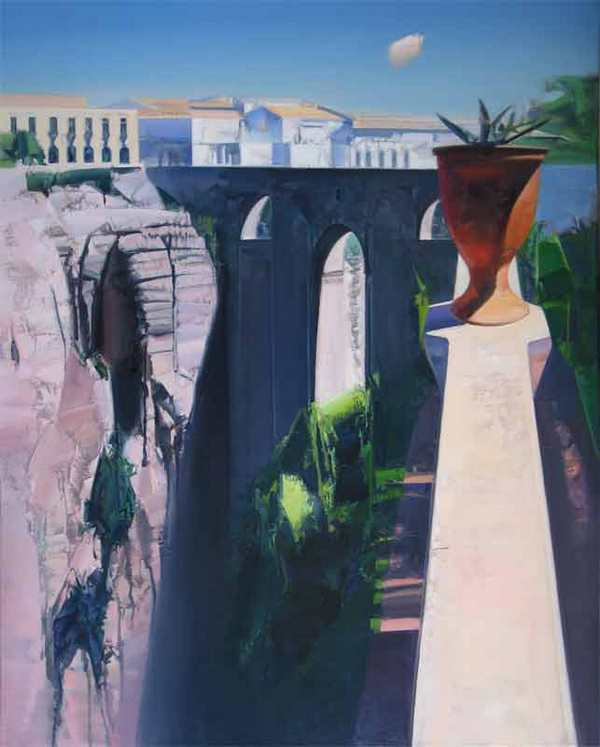
Nikolai Romanov.
Bridge in Ronda. 2014

== Sources ==
- Sergei V. Ivanov. The Leningrad School of Painting. Essays on the History. St Petersburg, ARKA Gallery Publishing, 2019. P.142, 326, 336, 354, 390—393, 396.
