= Vladimir Sakson =

Russian painter

Vladimir Stanislavovich Sakson
- Born: 17 May 1927; Leningrad, USSR
- Died: 13 March 1988 (aged 60); Leningrad, USSR
- Education: Repin Institute of Arts
- Known for: Painting, Illustration, Scenography, Decoration
- Movement: Realism

Vladimir Stanislavovich Sakson (Russian: Влади́мир Станисла́вович Са́ксон; 17 May 1927 – 13 March 1988) was a Soviet painter, book illustrator, scenographer, stage designer and art decorator, living and working in Leningrad, a member of the Leningrad branch of Union of Artists of Russian Federation, regarded by art historian Sergei V. Ivanov as a representative of the Leningrad school of painting.

== Biography ==
Vladimir Stanislavovich Sakson was born on 17 May 1927 in Leningrad, USSR. In 1939-1940, V. Sakson participated in a competition of children’s drawings held in the memory of Pushkin in which his works stood out and his artistic talents were recognized. He was admitted along with other gifted young artists to the art studio at the Pioneer Union under the direction of Professor M.A. Gorohova. Later, he was accepted into the Artist School at the Academy of Art. There he studied under the patronage of such great artists as Andrei Mylnikov and Olga Bogaevskaya. The Second World War dramatically interrupted V. Sakson’s studies and forced his maturation. It was under siege that he first learned that he had been born under a lucky star – a friend of his whom he had been holding was killed in his arms during the raid by a stray bullet. The second time V. Sakson learned of his lucky star was during the evacuation of Leningrad. He and his mother missed the car that was to have taken them out of the city. The car that they could not reach sunk under ice during its escape. V. Sakson and his mother managed to escape from the besieged city and were sent to Samarkand. After the war, the refugees returned to Leningrad and V. Sakson returned to art school to continue his studies. In 1949 V. Sakson entered the Ilya Repin Institute. During his studies he became involved with a traveling theater group, creating sets for their performances of Trembita and Free Wind. For his diploma project he created a set for the N. Rimsky-Korsakov play Sadko. In 1954 Sakson graduated from Ilya Repin Institute in Mikhail Bobyshov workshop, where he also studied of Alexander Debler, Yuri Neprintsev, Mikhail Platunov, Alexander Segal.

Since 1955 Vladimir Sakson has participated in Art Exhibitions. He painted portraits, landscapes, decorative compositions, worked as a theatre artist and in Art illustration. His first solo exhibition was opened in Saint Petersburg in 2007. Since 1960 Vladimir Sakson was a member of the Leningrad Union of Artists. V. Sakson began his career as a scenographer at Molotov Opera and Ballet Theater, now Perm Theater. Many of his sketches of costumes and decorations can be found in the theater’s archives. While working as a scenographer, he also found enjoyment in easel painting. Sakson enjoyed working as a book illustrator, working in lithographic studios illustrating children’s books. He created illustrations for poetry collections by V. Solouchin, B. Fedorov, and B. Kornilov. In the eighties V. Sakson was commissioned to create five murals for the Admiralteyskaya factory reflecting the glorious history of the Russian fleet. Unfortunately, the murals were destroyed and we can appreciate the unique character of this work only on the basis of archival drawings. Whether portraits or genre paintings, V. Sakson’s masterpieces are distinguished by their lyricism and delicacy. He was most inspired by nature. The exquisite scenery of Baikal, Tumen, Sayan, and Crimea became the sources for many of his successful works. He was also a passionate traveler and mountain climber. This passion for nature sometimes manifested itself in strange ways. Thus he could, following a sudden inner urge, travel to Kamchatka, only making known his disappearance by calling home when already far away. During his many cross-country journeys, he could always find interesting characters for his portraits. Attention to the faces in his portraits – whether of an old Uzbek potter or of a fashionista – yields their character’s personal traits, which attracted Sakson.

Vladimir Stanislavovich Sakson died on 13 March 1988 in Leningrad. His paintings reside in art museums and private collections in Russia, France, Germany, Japan, Italy, England, and other countries.

== See also ==
- Leningrad School of Painting
- List of painters of Saint Petersburg Union of Artists
- List of the Russian Landscape painters
- Saint Petersburg Union of Artists

== Bibliography ==
- Выставка произведений ленинградских художников 1960 года. Каталог. Л., Художник РСФСР, 1961, c.16, 35-36
- Советская Россия. Республиканская художественная выставка. Каталог. М., Министерство культуры РСФСР, 1960, c. 73
- Таганов В. Владимир Саксон. «Вечерний натюрморт» //Художник. 1962, № 8., c. 15
- Каталог весенней выставки произведений ленинградских художников 1965 года. Л., Художник РСФСР, 1970., с. 27
- Никифоровская И. У художников весна. // Ленинградская правда, 1965, 19 июня
- Осенняя выставка произведений ленинградских художников. 1968 года. Каталог. Л., Художник РСФСР, 1971., с.14
- Весенняя выставка произведений ленинградских художников 1969 года. Каталог. Л.,Художник РСФСР, 1970., с.16
- Каталог произведений художников Российской Федерации, переданных в дар организациям и учреждениям культуры (1963—1971 гг.). М., СХ РСФСР, 1972., с.95
- Весенняя выставка произведений ленинградских художников 1971 года. Каталог. Л., Художник РСФСР, 1972., c. 14
- Наш современник. Каталог выставки произведений ленинградских художников 1971 года. Л., Художник РСФСР, 1972., с. 20
- Наш современник. Вторая выставка произведений ленинградских художников 1972 года. Л., Художник РСФСР, 1973., с. 11
- Натюрморт. Выставка произведений ленинградских художников. Л., Художник РСФСР, 1973., с. 12
- По Родной стране. Выставка произведений ленинградских художников. Каталог. Л., Художник РСФСР, 1974., с. 23
- Весенняя выставка произведений ленинградских художников. Каталог. Л., Художник РСФСР, 1974., с. 10
- Наш современник. Зональная выставка произведений ленинградских художников 1975 года. Каталог. Л., Художник РСФСР, 1980., с. 23
- Изобразительное искусство Ленинграда. Каталог выставки. Л., Художник РСФСР, 1976., c. 29
- Exhibition of modern Soviet Painting. 1976. Gekkoso Gallery. Catalogue. Tokyo, 1976, p. 84-86, 154
- Справочник членов Союза художников СССР. Том 2. М., Советский художник, 1979, с. 308
- Зональная выставка произведений ленинградских художников 1980 года. Каталог. Л., Художник РСФСР, 1983., с. 22
- Справочник членов Ленинградской организации Союза художников РСФСР. Л., Художник РСФСР, 1987., с. 115
- Saint-Pétersbourg - Pont-Audemer. Dessins, Gravures, Sculptures et Tableaux du XX siècle du fonds de L' Union des Artistes de Saint-Pétersbourg. Pont-Audemer. 1994. p. 45
- Matthew C. Bown. Dictionary of 20th Century Russian and Soviet Painters 1900-1980s. London., Izomar, 1998. ISBN 0-9532061-0-6, ISBN 978-0-9532061-0-0
- Связь времён. 1932-997. Художники — члены Санкт-Петербургского Союза художников России. Каталог выставки. Санкт-Петербург., ЦВЗ «Манеж», 1997., с. 297
- Русская деревня. Выставка произведений петербургских художников. Живопись. Графика. СПб., Мемориальный музей Н. А. Некрасова, 1998
- Логвинова Е. В. Владимир Саксон. Живопись. СПб., 2007
