= Zenonas Petrauskas =

Zenonas Petrauskas (22 June 1950 – 18 January 2009) was a Lithuanian lawyer and deputy foreign minister of Lithuania (2004–2006). He was as an associate professor of international law. He was born in Čekiškė (Kaunas district municipality).

== Biography ==
After graduation from a secondary school in Ariogala, Petrauskas continued his studies at the Law Faculty of Vilnius University and graduated in 1975. In 1982 he obtained his doctorate from the Institute of Philosophy, Sociology and Law of the Lithuanian Academy of Sciences. Petrauskas worked with several European universities: the Institute for Ostrecht of the University of Cologne in Germany (1991), the Institute for Political Sciences of the University of Umea in Sweden (1994), the University of Aarhus in Denmark (1995), and the Université libre de Bruxelles in Belgium (1997).

From 1991 until September 2005, he was head of the Department of International Law and EU Law of the Law Faculty of Vilnius University. Petrauskas was the author of several monographs on diplomatic law and consular law. He died in Vilnius in January 2009.

== Publications ==
- Petrauskas, Zenonas; Dainius Žalimas; Skirgailė Žaltauskaitė–Žalimienė (2003). Diplomatinė teisė. Teisinės informacijos centras. ISBN 9955-557-15-X.
- Petrauskas, Zenonas (2007). Konsulinė teisė. Teisinės informacijos centras. ISBN 978-9955-30-005-2.
