= Peter Petrovich Troyanskii =

Russian scholar

Petr Petrovich Troyanskii (January 1894 – 24 May 1950) was a Russian educator and scholar.

He was born into the family of a railway repair-shop worker in Orenburg in the Southern Urals. The family had fourteen children and the living was hard. He finished a parish school in Orenburg and passed gymnasia examinations without attending classes, after which he entered the University of St. Petersburg. He made his living by giving lessons. World War I prevented him from finishing university. After the Great October Revolution of 1917, he entered the Institute of Red Professors. Afterwards he taught social sciences and the history of science and technology at higher educational establishments. He also participated in compiling the Technical Encyclopedia and the Great Soviet Encyclopedia. In those years he devoted more and more time to putting into practice his idea of a translating machine. Stenocardia prevented him from completing the work on mechanising translation, which he considered the cause of his whole life.
