= Nikolai Ovchinnikov =

Russian painter (1918–2004)

- Born: 14 October 1918; Mizhuli, Soviet Union
- Died: February 2004 (aged 85); Cheboksary, Russia
- Education: Repin Institute of Arts
- Known for: Painting
- Awards: People's Artist of the RSFSR, People's Artist of the Chuvash Republic

Nikolai Vasilyevich Ovchinnikov (Russian: Николай Васильевич Овчинников; 14 October 1918 – February 2004) was a Russian painter and professor. An ethnic Chuvash, he was the People's Artist of Russia and Chuvashia and Member of the National Academy of Sciences and Arts of the Chuvash Republic.

== Biography ==
He was born in the village of Mizhuli in Mariinsko-Posadsky District of the Chuvash Republic in 1918.

Studied in Alatyr Art School (1937).

During 1939–1945, Ovchinnikov fought in the Soviet-Finnish War on the Karelian Isthmus and World War II.

Since 1944, a member of the USSR Union of Artists.

In 1951 he graduated from the Ilya Repin Institute of Arts, Sculpture and Architecture of the USSR Academy of Arts in Leningrad (now St. Petersburg (workshop of Professor R.R. Frenz). A Candidate degree in Art Studies in 1954.

Since 1960, he was an associate professor of the Chair of Arts at the Fine and Graphic Arts Department of the Chuvash State Teacher's Institute named after I.Ya. Yakovlev.

Secretary of the Board of the RSFSR Union of Artists (1961–1983).

Chairman of the Board of the Union of Artists of the Chuvash ASSR (1963–1989).

People's Artist of the Chuvash ASSR (1968).

Professor of Fine Arts Chair (1973).

Full member of the National Academy of Sciences and Arts of the Chuvash Republic (1995).

RSFSR People's Artist (1984).

== Exhibitions ==
He participated in regional, Ull-Union, All-Russian exhibitions and in exhibitions abroad. Personal exhibitions in the US, Japan, France, UK, and Germany.

== Gallery ==
Paintings by Nikolai Ovchinnikov are in 34 museums in Russia and abroad, and in private collections.

== Awards ==
- He was awarded with the Order of the Patriotic War (2nd degree) and the Order of Friendship of Peoples (1978)
- He was awarded the State Prize of the Chuvash Republic named after K. V. Ivanov (1975)
- His name was entered into the Honorary Book of Labour Fame and Heroism of the Chuvash Autonomous Republic (1989)
- He was awarded a gold medal of the National Academy of Sciences and Arts of the Chuvash Republic (2002).
