= Mayakovski, Armenia =

Village in Kotayk, Armenia

Mayakovski Մայակովսկի
- Location within Armenia
- Coordinates: 40°15′08″N 44°38′18″E
- Country: Armenia
- Province: Kotayk
- Elevation: 1,414 m (4,639 ft)

Population (2011)
  - Total: 2,161
- Time zone: UTC+4 (AMT)

Mayakovski (Armenian: Մայակովսկի, also Mayakawvsky) is a village in the Kotayk Province of Armenia.

== Etymology ==
The village was named in honor of the Soviet poet Vladimir Mayakovsky. The village was previously known as Shaab or Shahab.
