= Dmitry Nalbandyan =

Russian artist

Dmitry Arkadyevich Nalbandyan (Armenian: Դմիտրի Նալբանդյան, Russian: Дми́трий Арка́дьевич Налбандя́н; 15 September 1906, Tiflis – 2 July 1993, Moscow) was a Soviet and Armenian painter and animator.

== Awards and honors ==
- Stalin Prize, 1st class (1946) – for Joseph Stalin's portrait
- Stalin Prize, 2nd class (1951) – for paintings "Great Friendship" and "Power to the Soviets – Peace to the People"
- Honored Art Worker of the RSFSR (1951)
- People's Visual Artist of the Armenian SSR (1965)
- Order of the Red Banner of Labour (8 December 1966)
- People's Visual Artist of the USSR (1969)
- Hero of Socialist Labour (14 September 1976)
- Order of Lenin (14 September 1976)
- Lenin Prize (1982) – for paintings dedicated to Vladimir Lenin
- Order of the October Revolution (22 August 1986)
- Medal "For Valiant Labour in the Great Patriotic War 1941–1945"
- Medal "In Commemoration of the 800th Anniversary of Moscow"
