= Mayakovsky (ship) =

Steam Ship

Coordinates: 56°56′40″N 24°06′03″E

Sinking of the steamer Mayakovsky
- Date: 13 August 1950
- Location: Daugava
- Cause: Vessel overloaded
- Outcome: 147 deaths

On August 13, 1950, the paddle steamer Mayakovsky (named for Soviet poet Vladimir Mayakovsky) sank at around 12:00 pm local time due to overloading of the vessel with too many people. The vessel's capacity was 150 people, but at the time of the disaster there were 421 people on board. Mayakovsky sank in the Daugava River that bisects Riga, not more than 15 metres (49 ft) from the present day site of the Stone Bridge. A total of 147 people died, including 48 children. It was the deadliest peacetime disaster in Soviet Latvian history. At the time, Latvia was a republic within the Soviet Union, under the rule of Joseph Stalin, and news of the disaster was not published in the state-controlled press. On August 19, 2011, almost 20 years after the breakup of the Soviet Union and Latvia regaining its independence, a memorial plaque was dedicated at the Stone Bridge (the Akmens tilts) in memory of the victims.
