= Vasily Yefanov =

Russian painter

Vasily Prokofyevich Yefanov (Russian: Василий Прокофьевич Ефанов) (23 November [O.S. 10 November] 1900, Samara – 3 March 1978, Moscow) was a Soviet and Russian painter and pedagogue. People's Painter of the USSR (1965). Three Stalin Prizes second degree (1941, 1946, 1950). Two Stalin Prizes third degree (1948, 1952).

== Selected works ==
- The (An) Unforgettable Meeting, 1934.
- A Street Fight, 1942.
- Portrait of Pyotr Leonidovich Kapitsa, 1958.
