= 1949 in the Soviet Union =

- Decades: 1920s; 1930s; 1940s; 1950s; 1960s
- See also: History of the Soviet Union; List of years in the Soviet Union

The following lists events that happened during 1949 in the Union of Soviet Socialist Republics.

== Incumbents ==
- General Secretary of the Communist Party of the Soviet Union — Joseph Stalin
- Chairman of the Presidium of the Supreme Soviet of the Soviet Union — Nikolay Shvernik
- Chairman of the Council of Ministers of the Soviet Union — Joseph Stalin

== Events ==
=== January ===
- January 25 — The Council for Mutual Economic Assistance (CMEA or COMECON) is established by the Soviet Union and other communist nations.
- c. January 29 — Stalin and antisemitism: The Soviet media resume a savage propaganda campaign against "rootless cosmopolitans", a euphemism for Soviet Jews, accusing them of being pro-Western and antisocialist

=== March ===
- March 25–28 — Operation Priboi

=== May ===
- May 12 — Cold War: The Soviet Union lifts the Berlin Blockade

=== July ===
- July 10 — 1949 Khait earthquake

=== August ===
- August 29 — The atomic bomb RDS-1 is exploded in the first Soviet nuclear test

=== September ===
- September 13 — The Soviet Union vetoes United Nations membership for Ceylon, Finland, Iceland, Italy, Jordan and Portugal

=== October ===
- October 2 — The Soviet Union recognizes the People's Republic of China, proclaimed on the previous day

=== November ===
- November 7 — Oil is discovered beneath the Caspian Sea, off the coast of the Azerbaijan Soviet Socialist Republic

=== December ===
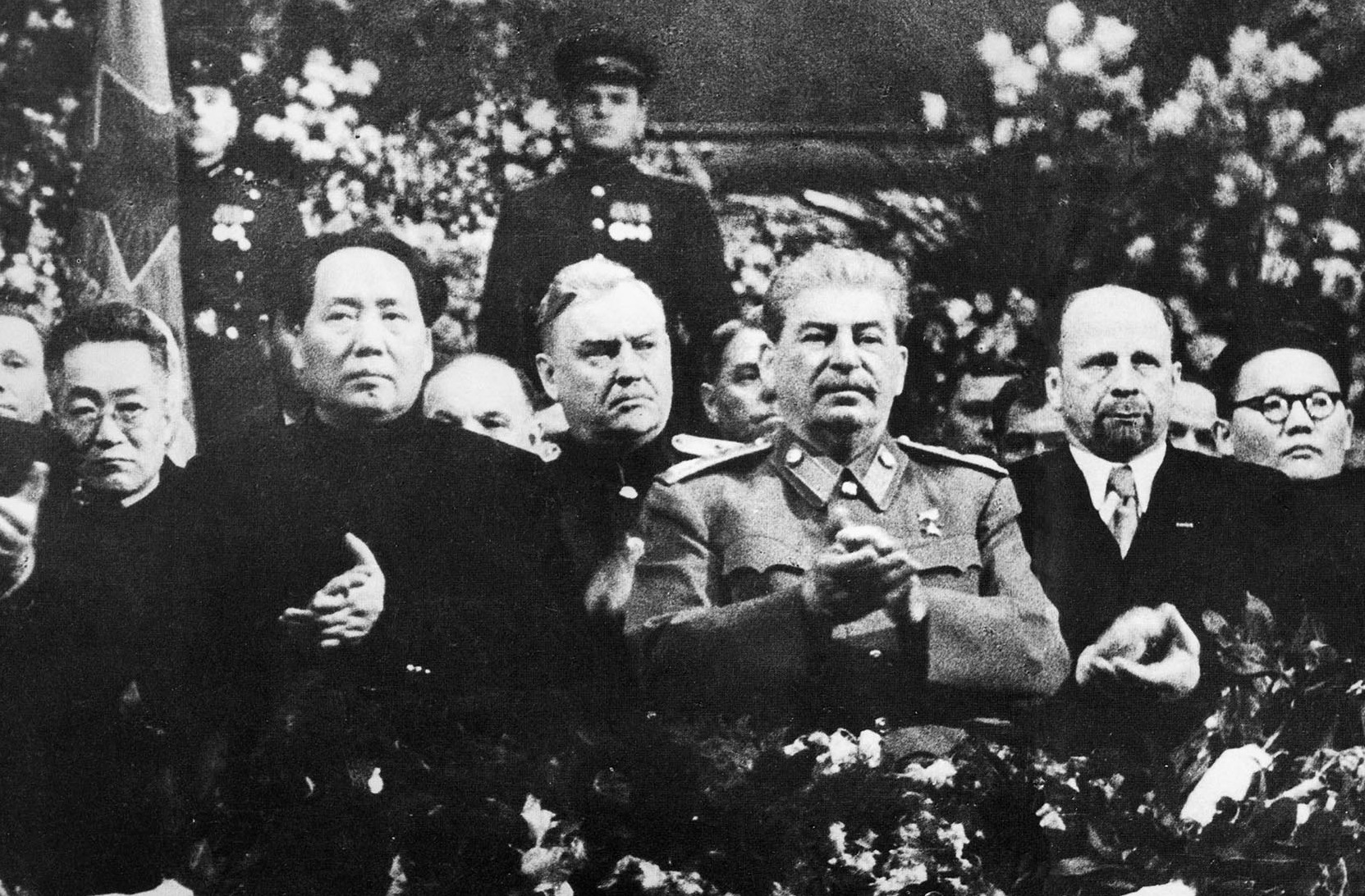
Stalin's 70th Birthday

- December 21 — Joseph Stalin's 70th Birthday is celebrated in Moscow
- December 25–31 — Khabarovsk War Crime Trials

== Births ==
- January 1 — Abdumalik Abdullajanov, 3rd Prime Minister of Tajikistan
- January 2
  - Gennady Novitsky, 5th Prime Minister of Belarus
  - Nikolai Pankin, breaststroke swimmer and swimming coach (d. 2018)
- January 3 — Nikolai Paltsev, politician (d. 2021)
- January 29 — Evgeny Lovchev, footballer
- February 16 — Yevgeny Nazdratenko, 2nd Governor of Primorsky Krai
- February 25 — Viktor Klimenko, Olympic gymnast
- February 26 — Viktor Ulyanich, boxer (d. 2014)
- March 4 — Sergei Bagapsh, 2nd President of Abkhazia (d. 2011)
- March 8 — Natalia Kuchinskaya, Olympic gymnast
- March 17 — Pavel Palazhchenko, interpreter
- March 18 — Boris Grachevsky, film director (d. 2021)
- March 19 — Valery Leontiev, actor and singer
- April 7 — Valentina Matviyenko, 4th Chairwoman of the Federation Council of Russia
- April 8 — Galust Sahakyan, 10th President of the National Assembly of Armenia (d. 2022)
- April 15 — Alla Pugacheva, singer and songwriter
- April 19 — Sergey Volkov, figure skater (d. 1990)
- April 21 — Vasily Guslyannikov, 1st Head of the Republic of Mordovia
- April 29 — Vasily Bochkaryov, 3rd Governor of Penza Oblast (d. 2016)
- May 2 — Aleksandr Kozlov, 3rd Governor of Oryol Oblast (d. 2021)
- May 15 — Nikolay Podgornov, 1st Governor of Vologda Oblast
- May 21 — Lyubov Polishchuk, actress (d. 2006)
- May 29 — Aleksandr Tsapin, 3rd Governor of Voronezh Oblast
- June 12 — Yuri Baturin, cosmonaut
- June 19 — Bolot Ayushiyev, 2nd Head of Agin-Buryat Autonomous Okrug
- June 20 — Vladimir Pechyony, 4th Governor of Magadan Oblast
- July 3 — Aleksandr Salnikov, basketball player (d. 2017)
- July 16 — Ishenbai Kadyrbekov, 4th Chairman of the Legislative Assembly of Kyrgyzstan
- July 31 — Valeriu Maravschi, 1st Prime Minister of Moldova (d. 2020)
- August 1 — Kurmanbek Bakiyev, 2nd President of Kyrgyzstan
- August 3 — Valeri Vasiliev, hockey player (d. 2012)
- August 5 — Yury Morozov, 9th Prime Minister of South Ossetia
- August 6 — Nikolay Kovalyov, 3rd Director of the Federal Security Service of Russia (d. 2019)
- August 11 — Vladimir Vasilyev, 5th Head of the Republic of Dagestan
- August 23 — Mikhail Golovatov, intelligence officer (d. 2022)
- September 16 — Kabibulla Dzhakupov, 7th Chairman of the Mäjilis of Kazakhstan
- September 17 — Marat Ospanov, 1st Chairman of the Mäjilis of Kazakhstan (d. 2000)
- September 18 — Gennady Komnatov, cyclist (d. 1979)
- September 23 — Elena Guskova, historian
- October 2 — Alexander Aksinin, painter (d. 1985)
- October 20 — Valeriy Borzov, athlete
- October 28 — Volodymyr Onyshchenko, footballer
- November 1 — Alexander Pushnitsa, sambo practitioner (d. 2023)
- November 3 — Alexander Gradsky, singer (d. 2021)
- November 4 — Abdujalil Samadov, 4th Prime Minister of Tajikistan (d. 2004)
- November 11 — Vladimir Polevanov, 3rd Governor of Amur Oblast
- November 14 — Vladimir Torlopov, 2nd Head of the Komi Republic
- November 21
  - Elena Mikhailovskaya, female draughts player (d. 1995)
  - Anatoliy Kuksov, footballer (d. 2022)
- November 23 — Viktor Poganovsky, Olympic equestrian
- November 29 — Vazha Lortkipanidze, 2nd State Minister of Georgia
- December 11 — Boris Scherbakov, film and theater actor
- December 21 — Aleksandr Kharchikov, folk singer-songwriter (d. 2023)

== Deaths ==
- January 16 — Vasily Degtyaryov, firearms designer (b. 1880)
- February 20 — Vasily Lebedev-Kumach, poet and lyricist (b. 1898)
- April 7 — Mikhail Denisenko, general (b. 1899)
- May 18 — Nikolai Semashko, 1st People's Commissar of Health of the Soviet Union (b. 1874)
- May 24 — Alexey Shchusev, architect (b. 1873)
- May 30 — Igor Belkovich, astronomer (b. 1904)
- October 1 — Nykyta Budka, priest of the Ukrainian Greek Catholic Church (b. 1877)
- October 14 — Roman Lysko, priest of the Ukrainian Greek Catholic Church (b. 1914)
- October 17 — Fyodor Tolbukhin, military commander (b. 1894)
- November 11 — Ignatiy Stelletsky, archaeologist, historian and researcher (b. 1878)
- December 3 — Maria Ouspenskaya, actress and acting teacher (b. 1876)
- December 31 — Raimond Valgre, composer and musician (b. 1913)

== See also ==
- 1949 in fine arts of the Soviet Union
- List of Soviet films of 1949
