= State Anthem of the Komi Republic =

Komi Respublikasa kyp
English: Anthem of the Komi Republic
- Коми Республикаса кып
- Coat of arms of the Komi Republic
- State anthem of the Komi Republic, Russia
- Also known as: «Ылын–ылын Войвылын» (English: 'Far, Far Away in the North')
- Lyrics: Viktor Savin, 1923
- Music: Viktor Savin, 1923
- Adopted: 4 July 2006

Audio sample
- Official orchestral and choral vocal recording in D major: file; help

Orchestral instrumental recording

The State Anthem of the Komi Republic is one of the official state symbols of the Komi Republic, a Federal subject of Russia, along with its flag and coat of arms.

== Origin ==
This anthem's melody is based on the melody of Viktor Savin's song "Varyš pos" ('Falcon's Nest'), edited by Mikhail Gertsman – chairman of the Union of Composers of the Komi Republic. It was edited by V. Timin into Komi, as amended by Alexandra Shergina and Alexander Suvorov in Russian.

== History ==
The current text of the anthem was selected on a competitive basis between 2005 and 2006, where the participants were required to have an accurate version of Viktor Savin's song "Varyš pos" in the republic's two official state languages – Komi and Russian. As a result, Vladimir Timin's work was chosen in Komi, and Alexandra Shergina's work was chosen in Russian. However, when the anthem was being recorded, the phrase in her text «Верим мы, твоя судьба» ('We Have Faith in Thy Destiny') turned out to be inconvenient for the performers, so it was subsequently changed to «Коми край» ('Komi Krai'). Later, the co-authorship of the Russian version was recognized; and as a result, the anthem was officially adopted by the State Council of the Komi Republic on 22 June 2006.

A new version of the anthem in both languages was first performed on 22 June 2006 by the State Song and Dance Ensemble named after V. Morozova "Asya Kya" at the V meeting of the 8th session of the State Council of the third convocation.

== Law and regulation ==
Adopted in 1994, the State Anthem was approved by the Law of the Republic of Komi dated 6 June 1994 No. XII-20/5 "On the State Anthem of the Republic of Komi". It is performed macaronically in both Komi and Russian – the official languages of the Komi Republic.

== Lyrics ==
The first two stanzas are in Komi, and the final two are in Russian.

Komi and Russian original

Ылын–ылын Войвылын
Джуджыд парма сулалӧ.
Парма шӧрын варыш поз
Кыпыд горӧн шыалӧ.

Лэбзьӧй, повтӧм варышъяс,
Вына бордъяс шеныштлӧй,
𝄆 Веськыд туйӧд нуӧдӧй,
Коми мусӧ югдӧдӧй! 𝄇

Север, наш родимый край,
Глубоки твои снега,
Холодны твои ветра,
Высока твоя тайга!

Нас несут через века
Соколиные крыла.
𝄆 Коми край, твоя судьба
Благодатна и светла! 𝄇

Old Permic script

𐍨𐍛𐍨𐍝–𐍨𐍛𐍨𐍝 𐍮𐍩𐍙𐍮𐍨𐍛𐍨𐍝
𐍖𐍣𐍖𐍨𐍓 𐍟𐍐𐍠𐍜𐍐 𐍡𐍣𐍛𐍐𐍛𐍞.
𐍟𐍐𐍠𐍜𐍐 𐍥𐍞𐍠𐍨𐍝 𐍮𐍐𐍠𐍨𐍥 𐍟𐍩𐍗
𐍚𐍨𐍟𐍨𐍓 𐍒𐍩𐍠𐍞𐍝 𐍥𐍨𐍐𐍛𐍞.

𐍛𐍔𐍑𐍗𐍰𐍞𐍙, 𐍟𐍩𐍮𐍢𐍞𐍜 𐍮𐍐𐍠𐍨𐍥𐍯𐍴𐍡,
𐍮𐍨𐍝𐍐 𐍑𐍩𐍠𐍓𐍯𐍴𐍡 𐍥𐍔𐍝𐍨𐍥𐍢𐍛𐍞𐍙,
𝄆 𐍮𐍔𐍡𐍰𐍚𐍨𐍓 𐍢𐍣𐍙𐍞𐍓 𐍝𐍣𐍞𐍓𐍞𐍙,
𐍚𐍩𐍜𐍙 𐍜𐍣𐍡𐍞 𐍳𐍒𐍓𐍞𐍓𐍞𐍙! 𝄇

𐍡𐍔𐍮𐍔𐍠, 𐍝𐍐𐍥 𐍠𐍩𐍓𐍙𐍜𐍨𐍙 𐍚𐍠𐍐𐍙,
𐍒𐍛𐍣𐍑𐍩𐍚𐍙 𐍢𐍮𐍩𐍙𐍙 𐍡𐍝𐍔𐍒𐍐,
𐍬𐍩𐍛𐍩𐍓𐍝𐍨 𐍢𐍮𐍩𐍙𐍙 𐍮𐍔𐍢𐍠𐍐,
𐍮𐍨𐍡𐍩𐍚𐍐 𐍢𐍮𐍩𐍴 𐍢𐍐𐍙𐍒𐍐!

𐍝𐍐𐍡 𐍝𐍔𐍡𐍣𐍢 𐍤𐍔𐍠𐍔𐍗 𐍮𐍔𐍚𐍐
𐍡𐍩𐍚𐍩𐍛𐍙𐍝𐍨𐍔 𐍚𐍠𐍨𐍛𐍐.
𝄆 𐍚𐍩𐍜𐍙 𐍚𐍠𐍐𐍙, 𐍢𐍮𐍩𐍴 𐍡𐍣𐍓𐍰𐍑𐍐
𐍑𐍛𐍐𐍒𐍩𐍓𐍐𐍢𐍝𐍐 𐍙 𐍡𐍮𐍔𐍢𐍛𐍐! 𝄇

Latin script

Ylyn–ylyn voivylyn
Džudžyd parma sulalõ.
Parma šõryn varyš poz,
Kypyd gorõn šyalõ.

Lebziõj povtom, varyšjas,
Vyna bordjas šenyštlõi,
𝄆 Vieśkyd tujõd nuõdõi,
Komi musõ jugdõdõi! 𝄇

Sievier, naš rodimyi krai,
Gluboki tvoji sniega,
Holodny tvoji vietra,
Vysoka tvoja taiga!

Nas niesut tšeriez vieka
Sokolinyje kryla.
𝄆 Komi krai, tvoja sudjba
Blagodatna i svietla! 𝄇

IPA transcription (Note: See: Help:IPA, Komi language § Phonology, Komi language § Writing system and Komi alphabets § Comparison of alphabets and IPA; File:Regional anthem of Komi vocal.oga, Help:IPA/Russian and Russian phonology.)

[ˈɨ.ɫi.n‿ˌɨ.ɫɨn ˈvoj.vɨ.ɫɨn]
[ˈd͡ʐu.d͡ʐɨt‿ˈpar.ma ˈsu.ɫa.ɫə ‖]
[ˈpar.ma ˈʂə.rɨn ˈva.rɨʂ poz]
[ˈkɨ.pɨd ˈgo.rən ˈʂɨ.a.ɫə ‖]

[ˈɫeb.ʑəj ˈpof.təm ˈva.rɨʂ.jas]
[ˈvɨ.na ˈbord.jas ˈʂe.nɨʂt.ɫəj ‖]
𝄆 [ˈvʲeɕ.kɨt‿ˈtu.jəd ˈnu.ə.dəj]
[ˈko.mʲi ˈmu.sə ˈjug.də.dəj ‖] 𝄇

[ˈsʲe.vʲɪr naʂ rɐ.ˈdʲi.mɨj kraj]
[ɡɫʊ.bɐ.ˈkʲi tvɐ.ˈi sʲnʲɪ.ˈga ‖]
[xə.ɫɐd.ˈnɨ tvɐ.ˈi vʲɪ.ˈtra]
[vɨ.sɐ.ˈka tvɐ.ˈja tɐj.ˈɡa ‖]

[nas nʲɪ.ˈsut ˈt͡ɕe.rʲɪz‿vʲɪ.ˈka]
[sə.kɐ.ˈlʲi.nɨ.je krɨ.ˈɫa ‖]
𝄆 [ˈko.mʲɪ kraj tvɐ.ˈja sʊdʲ.ˈba]
[bɫə.ɡɐ.ˈdat.nə i svʲɪt.ˈɫa ‖] 𝄇

English translation

Far, far away in the North,
The immense taiga standeth.
There a falcon's nest resteth,
Joyous chirps heard from the breadth.

Fly away, fearless falcons,
Flutter thy mighty grand wings!
𝄆 Lead Komi land to new paths
To luminous life of bliss! 𝄇

O North, thou land beloved,
Thy snowy fields deep and wide.
Thy winds wintry and frigid,
Thy taiga lofty and raised.

Brought through the past centuries
By thy mighty falcon wings.
𝄆 O Komi krai, thy future
Gloweth merrily and fair! 𝄇

Translation:

== Original song ==
Cyrillic script

Ылын-ылын, войвылын,
Джуджыд парма сулалӧ.
Парма пасьта шувгӧ вӧр,
Кӧдзыд вой тӧв шутьлялӧ.

Парма пӧвстын пемыд йӧз –
Коми войтыр олӧны;
Югыдінӧ петан туй
Нэм чӧж найӧ корсьӧны.

Парма пӧвстын олӧмысь
Жугыльтчӧма сьолӧмъяс:
Жугыль Коми войтырлӧн
Эз вӧв гажа сьылӧмъяс.

Парма шӧрын варыш поз,
Варыш котыр быдмӧны,
Йӧзлысь шуштӧм сьылӧмсӧ
Парма пӧвстысь кылӧны.

Лэбзьӧй, повтӧм варышъяс,
Вына бордъяс шеныштлӧй,
Джуджыд парма садьмӧдӧй,
Гажа гажсӧ пекӧдлӧй!

Коми йӧзӧс, лэбачьяс,
Веськыд туйӧд нуӧдӧй,
Жугыль олӧм пальӧдӧй,
Коми мусӧ югдӧдӧй!

Molodtsov alphabet
(Original orthography)

Ылын-ылын, војвылын,
Җуҗыԁ парма сулалӧ.
Парма паԍта шувгӧ вӧр,
Кӧԇыԁ вој тӧв шуԏԉалӧ.

Парма пӧвстын пјемыԁ јӧз –
Комі војтыр олӧны;
Југыԁінӧ пјетан туј
Нем чӧж најӧ корԍӧны.

Парма пӧвстын олӧмыԍ
Жугыԉтчӧма ԍолӧмјас:
Жугыԉ Комі војтырлӧн
Ез вӧв гажа ԍылӧмјас.

Парма шӧрын варыш поз,
Варыш котыр быԁмӧны,
Јӧзлыԍ шуштӧм ԍылӧмсӧ
Парма пӧвстыԍ кылӧны.

Лебԅӧј, повтӧм варышјас,
Вына борԁјас шјеныштлӧј,
Җуҗыԁ парма саԃмӧԁӧј,
Гажа гажсӧ пјекӧԁлӧј!

Комі јӧзӧс, лебачјас,
Вјеԍкыԁ тујӧԁ нуӧԁӧј,
Жугыԉ олӧм паԉӧԁӧј,
Комі мусӧ југԁӧԁӧј!

Transliteration

Ьlьn-ьlьn, vojvьlьn,
Зuзьd parma sulalə.
Parma pas̢ta ꞩuvgə vər,
Kəӡьd voj təv ꞩut̢l̢alə.

Parma pəvstьn pjemьd jəz –
Komi vojtьr olənь;
Jugьdinə pjetan tuj
Nem c̢əƶ najə kors̢ənь.

Parma pəvstьn oləmьs̢
Ƶugьl̢tc̢əma s̢oləmjas:
Ƶugьl̢ Komi vojtьrlən
Ez vəv gaƶa s̢ьləmjas.

Parma ꞩərьn varьꞩ poz,
Varьꞩ kotьr bьdmənь,
Jəzlьs̢ ꞩuꞩtəm s̢ьləmsə
Parma pəvstьs̢ kьlənь.

Lebⱬəj, povtəm varьꞩjas,
Vьna bordjas ꞩenьꞩtləj,
Зuзьd parma sad̢mədəj,
Gaƶa gaƶsə pjekədləj!

Komi jəzəs, lebac̢jas,
Vjes̢kьd tujəd nuədəj,
Ƶugьl̢ oləm pal̢ədəj,
Komi musə jugdədəj!

== Protocol ==
According to the Law, the anthem can be performed in orchestras, chorals, and in other vocal or instrumental performances. Cases of anthem performance have been identified, such as upon assuming office of the Head of the Komi Republic or the Chairman of the State Council, while the anthem is performed after the Russian national anthem. During public performances, those present while standing includes men without wearing any headwear. If the performance of the anthem is accompanied by the raising of the flag, those present turn to face it.
