= Yuri Spiridonov =

Russian politician (1938–2010)

- Юрий Спиридонов
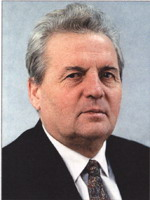

Member of the State Duma for Syktyvkar
- In office 29 December 2003 – 24 December 2007
- Preceded by: Valery Markov
- Succeeded by: Proportional representation

Head of the Komi Republic
- In office 7 June 1994 – 15 January 2002
- Preceded by: Position established
- Succeeded by: Vladimir Torlopov

Chairman of the Supreme Soviet of the Komi SSR/Komi Republic
- In office 24 April 1990 – 7 June 1994
- Preceded by: Position established
- Succeeded by: Position abolished; Vladimir Torlopov as chairman of the State Council

First Secretary of the Komi Regional Committee of the CPSU
- In office 9 August 1989 – June 1990
- Preceded by: Vladimir Melnikov
- Succeeded by: Aleksey Batmanov

Personal details
- Born: Yury Alekseyevich Spiridonov; 1 November 1938 Poltavka, Poltavsky District, Omsk Oblast, Russian SFSR, Soviet Union
- Died: 12 August 2010 (aged 71) Syktyvkar, Russia
- Party: Independent
- Other political affiliations: A Just Russia (2007); United Russia (2004–2007)

Yuri Alekseyevich Spiridonov (Russian: Юрий Алексеевич Спиридонов; 1 November 1938 – 12 August 2010), was a Russian politician who had served as a member of the State Duma of the 4th convocation from 2003 to 2007.

Spirodov was known to be the first Head of the Komi Republic, having served from 1992 to 2002.

He had also been the First Secretary of the Komi Regional Committee of the CPSU from 1989 to 1990, Chairman of the Supreme Soviet of the Komi ASSR from 1990 to 1992.

== Biography ==
Yuri Spirodonov was born in the village of Poltavka, Omsk Oblast on 1 November 1938 to a Russian family.

In 1961 he graduated from the Sverdlovsk Mining Institute with a degree in Mining Engineer.

In 1961, he worked at the Gorny mine in Magadan Oblast as a foreman, deputy section chief, senior mining foreman, and was elected chairman of the trade union committee.

From 1964 to 1975, he was a foreman, the head of a site, chief engineer, and head of an oil mine at the Yaregsky Oil Mine Administration in the Komi ASSR.

He was a member of the CPSU until August 1991.

In 1975, he became the Head of the Industrial and Transport Department of the Ukhta City Committee of the CPSU. Between 1981 and 1984, he was the First Secretary of the Usinsky District Committee of the CPSU.

In 1982, he graduated from the Leningrad Higher School of Education, with a Ph.D.

In January 1985 he was elected second secretary. In August 1989, he became the first secretary of the Komi Regional Committee of the CPSU. He was also elected a deputy of the Supreme Soviet of the RSFSR and the Supreme Soviet of the Komi ASSR, and People's Deputy of the USSR from 1990 to 1991.

On 24 April 1990 was elected Chairman of the Supreme Council of the Komi ASSR.

In December 1993, he was elected to the Federation Council of the first convocation (received 45.14% of the votes), until April 1994 he was a member of the Committee on the Budget, Currency, Financial and Credit Regulation, Money Issue, Tax Policy and Customs Regulation, later on - a member Committee for the North.

On 7 May 1994, Spiridonov won the election of the Head of the Komi Republic and, according to the Constitution of this republic, became at the same time the head of government. On 30 November 1997, he won the early elections of the Head of the Republic and re-entered this position on 30 December 1997.

From January 1996, he was a member of the Federation Council of the Russian Federation ex officio, was a member of the Committee for the Affairs of the North and Indigenous Peoples.

In 2001, he again ran as a candidate for the post of Head of the Komi Republic, in the elections on 16 December he won 34.9% of the vote and lost the victory to Vladimir Torlopov, who was the Chairman of the State Council of the Republic who won 40% of the votes.

On 7 December 2003, Spiridonov was elected to the 4th State Duma in the Syktyvkar single-mandate electoral district No. 18 of the Komi Republic, was a member of the United Russia faction, a member of the Committee on Natural Resources and Nature Management. He held this position until 2007.

He died in Syktyvkar on 12 August 2010. He was buried at the Krasnozatonsky cemetery.
