= Flag of the Komi Republic =

Flag of the Russian republic of Komi

Komi Republic
- Proportion: 2:3
- Adopted: 17 December 1997
- Design: A horizontal tricolor of blue, green, and white.
- Designed by: Vladimir Yakovlevich Serditov
- Flag of the Komi Republic from 1991 until 1997. The flag had a ratio of 1:2
- Proportion: 1:2
- Adopted: 27 November 1991
- Design: A horizontal tricolor of blue, green, and white.
- Flag of the Komi Republic under the Soviet Union within the Russian SFSR.
- Use: State and war flag
- Proportion: 1:2
- Adopted: 23 July 1954
- Designed by: Valentin Petrovich Viktorov

The Flag of the Komi Republic (Komi: Коми республикаса дӧрапас, romanized: Komi respublikasa dörapas) in Russia is one of the official symbols of the federal subject, alongside the coat of arms and the state anthem of the republic. The flag is a horizontal tricolour with 2:3 proportion. The flag was composed of three bars of, from top to bottom, medium blue, green, and white.

Prior to 1991, the Komi Republic existed as the Komi Autonomous Soviet Socialist Republic. The flag of the Komi ASSR corresponds to the flag of the Russian SFSR with additional inscriptions.

== Symbolism ==
The flag represents Komi's natural wealth. The blue represents the splendour and spaciousness of the northern sky. The green represents nature, its bounty, and the taiga. The white represents the color of snow, the purity of nature in the north, simplicity, and austerity, as well as Komi being a country in the north. According to a different interpretation, the white represents the equality and unity of the people and cultures living in Komi. Also notable is the similarity of the flag to the national flag of tribal Estonians.

== Legislation ==
Currently, the law that regulates the flag of Komi Republic is the Law "On the State Flag of the Komi Republic". The law entered into force on 6 July 1994. The latest amendment was enacted on 26 June 2017.

=== Flag protocol ===
By law, the Komi flag should be flown daily, weather permitting, from the following locations:

- the State Council of the Komi Republic
- the residence of the ministers of Komi
- courts of Komi, and offices of local executive and administrative bodies
- above buildings in which sessions of local Councils of deputies take place
- buildings used by Komi diplomats

The Komi flag is also officially flown on the sites of special occasions:

- official ceremonies
- family celebrations
- celebrations held by public authorities of the Republic of Komi, public associations, enterprises, institutions and organizations.

When the flag was simultaneously raised among other flags of the constituent entities of the Russian Federation, the sequence and their location is determined in accordance with the sequence of enumeration of constituent entities of the Russian Federation in the Constitution of the Russian Federation. While simultaneously raising the flag among the flags of foreign countries, the sequence of their location is determined alphabetically.

=== Half-mast ===
The law also allows the flag to be raised half-mast as a symbol of mourning. In such cases, in the upper part of the mast of the flag, a black ribbon is fastened, the length of which is equal to the length of the flag panel.

=== Flag desecration ===
According to article 13 of the law, the expression of disrespect, as well as desecration of the national flag is punishable by the Law of the Republic of Komi "On Administrative Responsibility in the Republic of Komi".

== Color specifications ==
Specifications for the flag of Komi

The law of the Komi Republic only says that the colors of the flag are "blue", "green", and "white". It does not specify the exact colors of the flag. In practice, however, official flags tend to use the following colors:

| Scheme | Blue | Green | White |
|---|---|---|---|
| Pantone | 286C | 355C | White |
| RGB | 0-51-160 | 0-150-57 | 255-255-255 |
| HTML | #0033A0 | #009639 | #FFFFFF |

== History ==
=== As the Komi ASSR ===
The first flag of the Komi ASSR was described in the first Constitution of the Komi ASSR, which was adopted by the Central Executive Committee of the Komi ASSR on 26 May 1937, at the 11th Extraordinary Congress of Soviets of the Komi ASSR. The flag was a red flag, in the left corner of which, at the top of the shaft, are placed the golden letters "RSFSR" in Russian and Komi languages, with the inscription "Komi ASSR" under it in Russian and Komi language. The inscription changed in 1938 after a new writing system for the Komi language was adopted.

On 23 July 1954, with the amendment of the constitution of the Komi ASSR and the change of the flag of the Russian SFSR, a new flag of the Komi ASSR was adopted. The flag was the same with the flag of the Russian SFSR, but with the inscription "Коми АССР" under the hammer and sickle.

26 May 1937 – 1938

1938 – 23 July 1954

23 July 1954 – 27 November 1991

=== As the Komi Republic ===
The flag of the Komi Republic was introduced by the Resolution of the Plenum of the Supreme Court of the Komi SSR on 27 November 1991, and by the law "On the Approval of the State Flag of the Komi SSR and Amendments to the Constitution of the Komi SSR". The national flag of the Komi Republic was finally approved and enacted on June 6, 1994, by the Law "On the State Flag of the Komi Republic".

The law was amended by the State Council on December 17, 1997 to change the proportions of the flag from 1:2 to 2:3. The change of the proportion was due to the desire to make the flags of Russia and Komi identical in size when hung together. The provision on the flag of Russia prohibits posting next to it flags of entities that exceed its size. The 1:2 proportion of the flag next to the Russian flag looked too narrow.

27 November 1991 – 17 December 1997

17 December 1997 – present

== Nordic cross proposal ==
In the 2010s Komi activists have been calling for the adoption of a new flag for the republic featuring a Nordic cross. Supporters of the change argue that the Nordic cross flag is better suited for Komi as it highlights its connection to Finland and Scandinavia, the Komi being related to the Finns. The most widely used flag was created by Sergey Sivkov in 2011 and uses the colours of the current flag. Blue symbolizes the lakes and rivers of the land, green for the taiga, and white for the snowy winters.

Proposed flag by Sergey Sivkov
