= Torlopov =

Torlopov (Russian: Торлопов) is a Russian masculine surname, its feminine counterpart is Torlopova. It may refer to

- Dmitry Torlopov (born 1977), Kazakhstani sprint canoer
- Nadezhda Torlopova (born 1978), Russian boxer
- Vladimir Torlopov (born 1949), Russian politician
