= Coat of arms of the Komi Republic =

Coat of arms of a Russian federal subject

Emblem of the Komi Republic
- Armiger: Rostislav Goldstein, Head of the Komi Republic
- Adopted: 1994

The coat of arms of the Komi Republic (Russian: герб Респу́блики Ко́ми; gerb Respubliki Komi; Komi: Коми республикалӧн канпас; Komi respublikalön kanpas; SHRRF #153), designed by A. Neverov, was instituted by Law No. XII-20/1 on June 6, 1994, and reflects the mythic beliefs of the Komi peoples. The blazon has a field gules, featuring a bird of prey or with the face below corresponding with the goddess Zarni An, and six unhorned elk heads. On December 17, 1997, the Republican State Council passed the law, which changed the official coat of arms definition in order to agree with the rules of heraldry.

A bird of prey in the traditional interpretation embodies the sun, authority, and the upper world, while elk is associated with power, generosity, and beauty. The combination of gules symbolizes the sun, maternity, and birth in the Komi folklore.

== History ==
Emblem of the Komi Autonomous Soviet Socialist Republic
- Armiger: Komi Autonomous Soviet Socialist Republic
- Adopted: 1937
- Crest: Red star
- Supporters: Wheat and Cotton
- Motto: (1937–1938); Став странајасса проԉетаріјас, ӧтувтчӧј! (1938–1978); Став странаясса пролетарийяс, oтувтчой! (1978–1994); Став мувывса пролетарийяс, oтувтчой! (Komi) Пролетарии всех стран, соединяйтесь! (Russian) "Workers of the world, unite!"

=== First version ===
The first emblem of the Komi ASSR was described in the first Constitution of the Komi ASSR, which was adopted by the Central Executive Committee of the Komi ASSR on 26 May 1937, at the 11th Extraordinary Congress of Soviets of the Komi ASSR. The emblem is described in Article 116 of the constitution :

The state emblem of the Komi Autonomous Soviet Socialist Republic is the state emblem of the RSFSR, which consists of the image of a golden sickle and hammer placed crosswise, arms down, on a red background in the rays of the sun and framed by ears of the RSFSR and “Workers of the world, unite!" in Russian and Komi languages with the addition under the inscription "РСФСР" letters of a smaller size inscription "Коми АССР" in Russian and Komi languages.

— Constitution of the Komi ASSR (1937), Article 115

The name of the republic is the same in both Russian and Komi, so there are only one inscription of the name of the ASSR in the emblem.

=== Second version ===
On 1938, the writing system of the Komi language was changed. The Komi inscriptions on the emblem, which previously used Latin Molodtsov alphabet, was changed into Cyrillic letters.

=== Third version ===
On May 23, 1978, the Extraordinary 8th Session of the Supreme Council of the 9th convocation of the Komi ASSR approved the new Constitution of the Komi ASSR. The emblem is now described in the Article 158 of the constitution :

The state emblem of the Komi Autonomous Soviet Socialist Republic is the State Emblem of the RSFSR, representing the sickle and hammer on a red background, in the rays of the sun and framed by ears, with the inscription: "РСФСР" in Russian and "Workers of the world, unite!" and Komi languages with the addition under the inscription "РСФСР" letters of the smaller size of the inscription "Коми АССР". At the top of the emblem is a five-pointed star.

— Constitution of the Komi ASSR (1978), Article 112

There was minor changes on the emblem. A star was supplemented at the top of the emblem. The motto in the Komi language changed from "СТАВ СТРАНАЯССА ПРОЛЕТАРИЙЯС, OТУВТЧОЙ!" became "СТАВ МУВЫВСА ПРОЛЕТАРИЙЯС, OТУВТЧОЙ!".

The regulations on the emblem were approved by the Decree of the Presidium of the Supreme Council of the Komi ASSR on September 15, 1981.

== Gallery ==
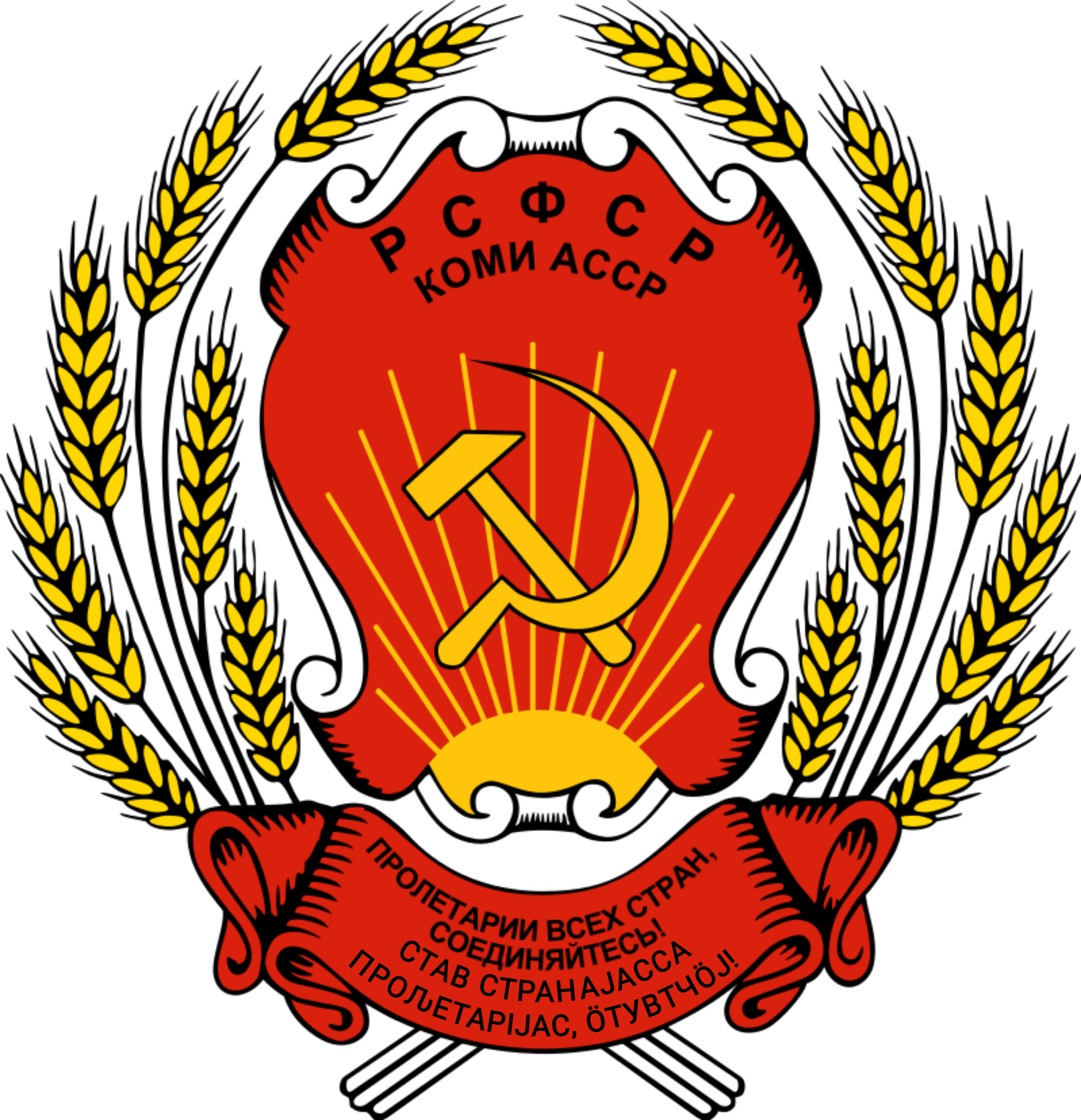
Emblem of the Komi ASSR (1937–1938)

Emblem of the Komi ASSR (1938–1978)

Emblem of the Komi ASSR (1978–1991) and the Komi Republic (1991–1994)

== See also ==
- Flag of the Komi Republic
