= Viktor Savin =

Komi poet

Viktor Savin (Komi: Виттор Нёбдiнса, romanized: Vittor Njobdinsa; Russian: Виктор Алексеевич Савин; 21 November 1888 – 11 August 1943) was a Komi poet, playwright, and actor who lived in the Soviet Union. He was born in the village of Nebdino. He created the anthem of the Komi Republic. (Note: The original text can be found here:) He also translated The Internationale into Komi language that was used by the Komi-Zyryan Autonomous Oblast, then by the Komi ASSR. He founded the Komi National Theatre. He was one of the founders of Soviet literature and theatrical art in Komi.

In 1937, he was convicted and arrested. He died on August 11, 1943 at the Prikulka camp.
