= Vyacheslav Gayzer =

Russian politician

Vyacheslav Gaizer
- Вячеслав Гайзер; Гайзер Вечӧ
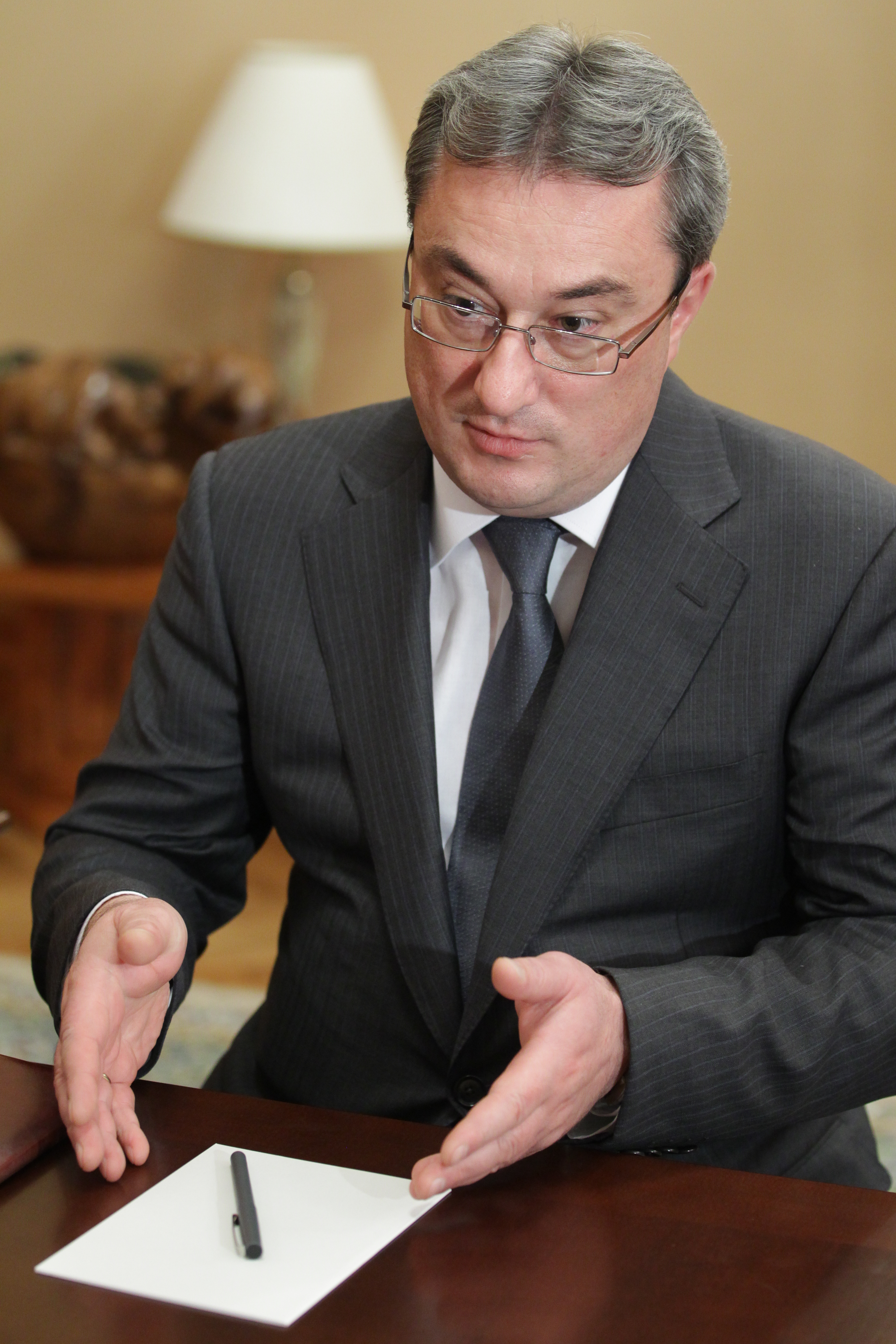
- Gaizer in 2010

3rd Head of the Komi Republic
- In office January 15, 2010 – September 30, 2015
- Preceded by: Vladimir Torlopov
- Succeeded by: Sergey Gaplikov

Personal details
- Born: December 28, 1966 (age 59) Inta, Komi ASSR, RSFSR, USSR
- Occupation: Engineer

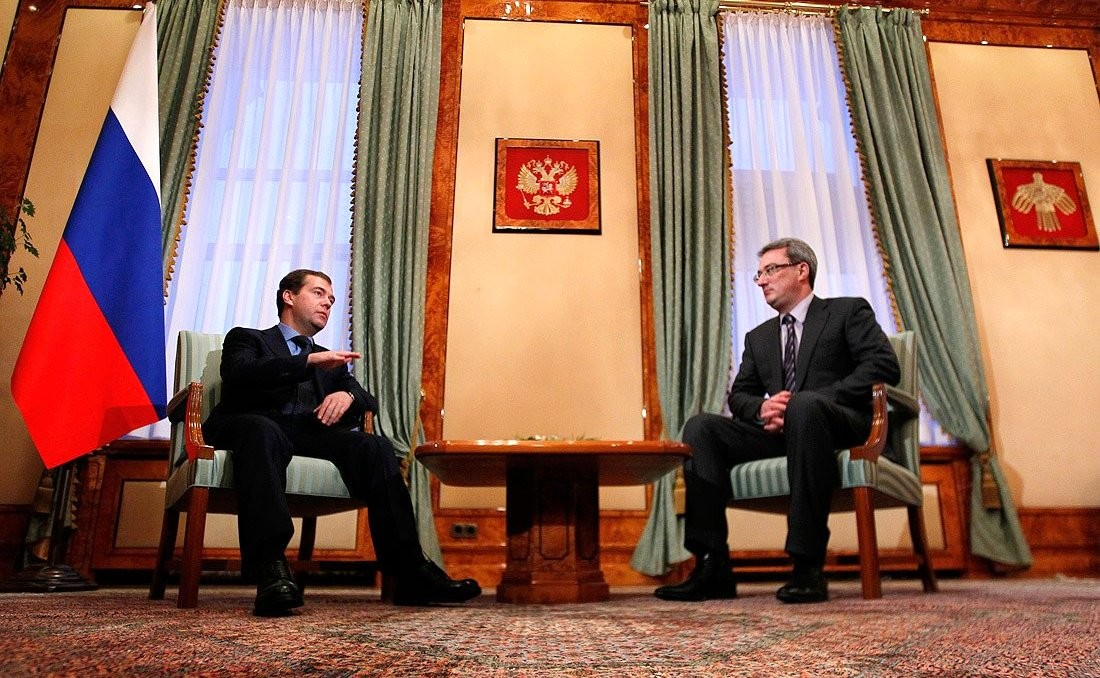
Gaizer (right) with the president of Russia Dmitri Medvedev, November 23, 2010

Vyacheslav Mikhalovich Gaizer (Russian: Вячеслав Михайлович Гайзер, Komi: Гайзер Миш Вечӧ, Gajźer Miš Većö), born in 1966, is a Russian politician who served as Head of the Komi Republic from January 2010 to September 2015.

On 19 September 2015, an investigation by Russia's Investigative Committee has led to his arrest. Gayzer and 18 of his associates, some of them also members of the regional administration, have been charged with organizing and running a criminal gang involved in the theft of state property on a mass scale. The charges against him were dropped in March 2017.

== See also ==
- List of people convicted of corruption in Russia

Political offices
Preceded by Vladimir Torlopov	Head of the Komi Republic; 2010–2015	Succeeded by Sergey Gaplikov
