= Vladimir Uyba =

Current head of the Komi Republic

- Владимир Уйба
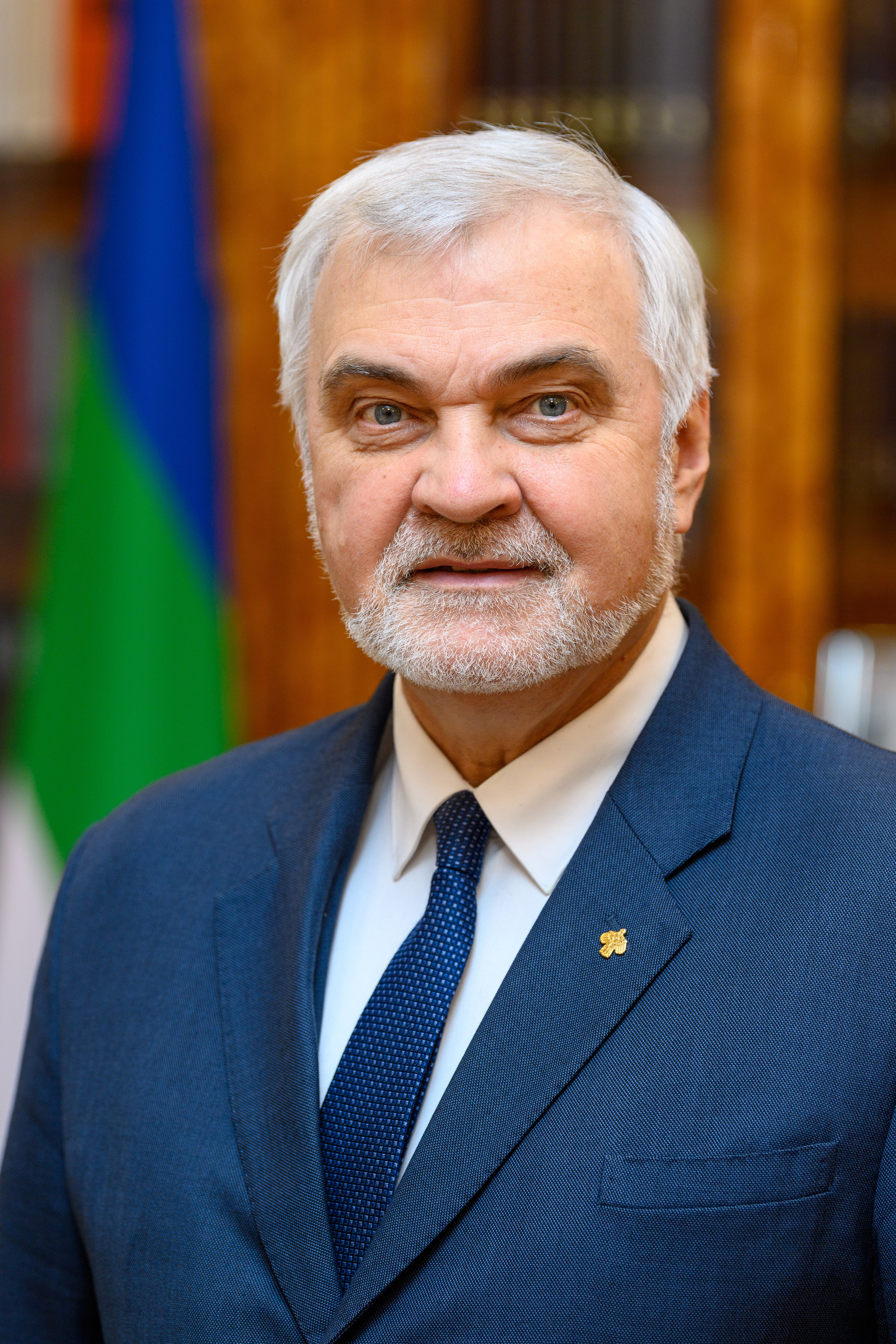
- Official portrait, 2020

5th Head of the Komi Republic
- In office 2 April 2020 – 5 November 2024
- Preceded by: Sergey Gaplikov
- Succeeded by: Rostislav Goldstein

Personal details
- Born: Valentin Viktorovich Uyba; October 4, 1958 (age 67) Omsk, Russian SFSR, Soviet Union
- Party: United Russia
- Spouse: Galina Yurievna Uyba
- Children: 5
- Education: Ural State Medical University; Russian Presidential Academy of National Economy and Public Administration
- Occupation: Scientist, doctor

Vladimir Viktorovich Uyba (Russian: Владимир Викторович Уйба; born Valentin Viktorovich Uyba, 4 October 1958) is a Russian politician, scientist, and doctor who was the 5th Head of the Komi Republic from 2020 to 2024. Before being appointed to that position, he was deputy health minister and head of the Federal Biomedical Agency.

He has the federal state civilian service rank of 1st class Active State Councillor of the Russian Federation. He is a doctor of medical sciences, a professor, and was awarded an honorary titles of the Honored Doctor of the Russian Federation, Honored Scientist of the Russian Federation, Honored Doctor of the Chechen Republic, Honored Doctor of the Republic of Ingushetia, and Honored Doctor of the Republic of South Ossetia. He is of Estonian descent through his father.

== Biography ==
Valentin Uyba was born on 4 October 1958 in Omsk, into a family of engineers. He changed his first name to Vladimir during the 2010s. In an interview, Uiba said that his father had Estonian roots, hence his surname has only one declension and should be pronounced as "Uibo".

=== Education ===
In 1982, Uyba graduated from the Sverdlovsk State Medical Institute, specializing in hygiene and epidemiology. In 2000, he graduated from the Russian Presidential Academy of National Economy and Public Administration with a degree in Economics and Enterprise Management. He is a Doctor of Medicine and University Professor.

=== Head of the Komi Republic ===
On April 2, 2020, President Vladimir Putin appointed Vladimir Uyba as acting Head of the Komi Republic. He replaced Sergey Gaplikov, who resigned because of the grave situation in the region caused by the COVID-19 pandemic.

Upon his appointment, Uyba brought several colleagues from the Federal medical-biological Agency (FMBA), where he had previously worked. He appointed Sergei Mamonov as the acting deputy head of the republican administration; and Dmitry Samovarov as the head of the regional administration. Viktoria Filina headed of the regional Ministry of Health. Moreover, in April of the same year, Uyba protested against the construction of the Shiyes landfill.

On April 17, 2020, Vladimir Uyba announced that he would run for the Head of the Komi Republic office in the elections scheduled for September of the same year. On June 24, he officially nominated his candidacy. On August 6, he was registered by the republican election commission as a candidate of the United Russia Party.

In the elections of the Head of the Komi Republic in September 2020, Uyba received 73.16% of the votes with a turnout of 30.16% of the total number of registered voters. His inauguration took place on September 23, 2020. Later, the Communist Party of the Russian Federation refused to recognize him as the legitimately elected candidate, with Oleg Mikhailov, the party's leader in the Komi Duma, calling him an "impostor".

Since January 29, 2022, he serves as Secretary of the regional branch of the United Russia Party (previously, he was the Acting Secretary from December 3, 2021, to January 29, 2022).

On November 5, 2024, Uyba resigned as head of the Komi Republic. On November 7 it was reported that he had been appointed the director of the Main Military Medical Directorate at the Russian Ministry of Defense.

=== Sanctions ===
Uyba is under personal sanctions introduced by the United Kingdom, Canada and Ukraine as he supported the Russian invasion of Ukraine.
