= Komi Regional Committee of the Communist Party of the Soviet Union =

The First Secretary of the Komi regional branch of the Communist Party of the Soviet Union was the position of highest authority in the Komi AO (1921–1936) and the Komi ASSR (1936–1991) in the Russian SFSR of the Soviet Union. The position was created in January 1921, and abolished in August 1991. The First Secretary was a de facto appointed position usually by the Politburo or the General Secretary himself.

== List of First Secretaries of the Komi Communist Party ==
Name	Term of Office		Life years
Name	Start	End	Life years
First Secretaries of the Communist Party
Yakov Potapov	January 1921	January 1922	1890–1942
Mikhail Minin	January 1922	August 1922	1897–1938
Afanasy Chirkov	September 1922	July 1924	1887–?
Dmitry Selivanov	July 1924	June 1927	1887–1939
Grigory Kozlov	June 1927	March 1929	1885–1975
Nikolay Lyustrov	March 1929	March 1930	1891–1938
Nikolay Kolegov	March 1930	August 1932	1897–1983
Aleksey Semichev	December 1932	November 2, 1937	1893–1941
Pavel Murashev	November 2, 1937	June 1938	1890–1942
Ivan Ryazanov	July 1938	March 1940	1903–1942
Aleksey Taranenko	March 1940	December 24, 1948	1900–1960
Georgy Osipov	December 25, 1948	March 23, 1957	1906–1980
Aleksandr Dmitrin	March 23, 1957	October 29, 1965	1914–2001
Ivan Morozov	October 29, 1965	March 28, 1987	1924–1987
Vladimir Melnikov	March 28, 1987	August 9, 1989	1935–2010
Yury Spiridonov	August 9, 1989	June 1990	1938–2010
V.S. Osipov (Note: Acting)	June 1990	October 1990	
Aleksey Batmanov	October 1990	August 1991	1939–

== See also ==
- Komi Autonomous Soviet Socialist Republic
