= Federal Medical-Biological Agency =

Executive body of the Russian Federation

- The flag of the FMBA of Russia

Agency overview
- Formed: 11 October 2004
- Preceding agencies: Third Main Directorate of the Soviet Ministry of Health (1947); Federal/Main Directorate for Biomedical and Extremeal affairs (1991)
- Jurisdiction: President of Russian Federation
- Headquarters: Moscow, Volokolamsk highway, 30
- Employees: 15'000
- Annual budget: 79.68 billion rubles (year 2024)
- Agency executive: Veronika Skvortsova
- Child agency: FMBA Blood Center
- Website: fmba.gov.ru

The Federal Medical-Biological Agency (FMBA; Russian: Федеральное медико-биологическое агентство, ФМБА России) is the federal executive body of the Russian Federation that exercises functions on normative and legal regulation in the sphere of medical and sanitary support for workers in certain industries with particularly hazardous working conditions (including during the preparation and performance of space flights, diving and caisson work), the organization of medical and biological support for athletes of the Russian national sports teams, the provision of state services and the management of state property in the sphere of healthcare, the provision of medical care, the organization of the activities of the blood service, federal state control over the safety of donor blood and its components, the implementation of federal state sanitary and epidemiological control in organizations of certain industries with particularly hazardous working conditions (including during the preparation and performance of space flights, diving and caisson work) and in certain territories of Russia (including facilities and territories of closed administrative-territorial entities, territories with physical, chemical and biological factors hazardous to human health) according to the lists approved by the Government of Russia, as well as functions on medical and sanitary support for workers of the organizations it serves and the population of the territories served (including the provision of services in the resort industry, the organization of forensic medical and forensic psychiatric examinations, transplantation of human organs and tissues), on the organization of medical and social examination of employees of the organizations served and the population of the territories served, on the organization and implementation of medical and sanitary measures to prevent, localize and eliminate the consequences of emergencies associated with radiation, chemical and biological incidents, accidents and terrorist acts, on the implementation of medical and sanitary measures in combat zones and in adjacent territories.

== History ==
The FMBA is the legal successor of the 3rd Main Directorate at the USSR Ministry of Health.

By Decree of the Government of the RSFSR dated December 26, 1991 No. 76 "On the Main Directorate of Biomedical and Extreme Problems under the Ministry of Health of the RSFSR", the former Third Main Directorate under the Ministry of Health of the USSR was transferred to the Ministry of Health of the RSFSR and became known as the Main Directorate of Biomedical and Extreme Problems under the Ministry of Health of the RSFSR.

By Decree of the President of the Russian Federation No. 1148 dated September 30, 1992 "On the Structure of Central Federal Executive Authorities", the Main Directorate of Biomedical and Extreme Problems under the Ministry of Health of the Russian Federation was reorganized into the Federal Directorate of Biomedical and Extreme Problems (FUMBEP, "Medbioextrem").

By Decree of the President of the Russian Federation dated October 11, 2004 No. 1304 "On the Federal Medical and Biological Agency" FUMBEP was abolished and the Federal Medical and Biological Agency (FMBA) was created on its basis.

By Decree of the President of Russia dated 06/17/2024 No. 522 "On the Federal Medical and Biological Agency" reassigned to the President of Russia.

== Head of the Agency ==
- Vladimir Uyba (November 6, 2004 — January 22, 2020)
- Veronika Skvortsova (from January 22, 2020)

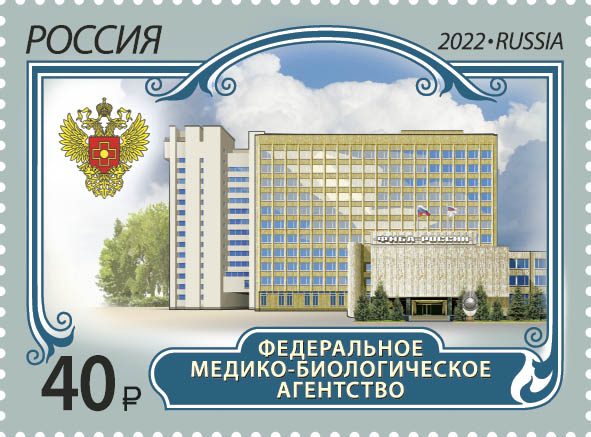
Postage stamp 2022

== Structure ==
- The FMBA Blood Center
- Central Medical-Sanitation Unit No. 1, responsible for medical help for Baikonur Cosmodrome workers.
- Directorate for Inspection and control over epidemic and sanitary security
- Directorate for organization of science research.
- Main Bureau for medical and social expertise
- Rosplasma - Russian medicine scientific center for blood plasma.

== Management ==
- Director: Veronika Skvortsova
  - Deputy Director: Vladimir Romanov
  - Deputy Director: Vyacheslav Rogozhnikov
  - Deputy Director: Andrey Sereda
  - Deputy Director: Yulia Miroshnikova
  - Deputy Director: Irina Fadeyeva

== Public Council ==
By Order of the FMBA of Russia dated 09/10/2007 No. 252, a Public Council was established at the Federal Medical and Biological Agency to address issues of providing medical and sanitary care to employees of enterprises with particularly dangerous working conditions and residents of certain territories, conducting social and hygienic monitoring, issuing individual legal acts in the field of sanitary and epidemiological welfare and health care for employees of certain industries with particularly dangerous working conditions and the population of certain territories. The same order approved the Regulations on this Council and its composition.

== See also ==
- Federal Service for Surveillance on Consumer Rights Protection and Human Wellbeing (Rospotrebnadzor)
