= 1949 in fine arts of the Soviet Union =

Soldier-liberator
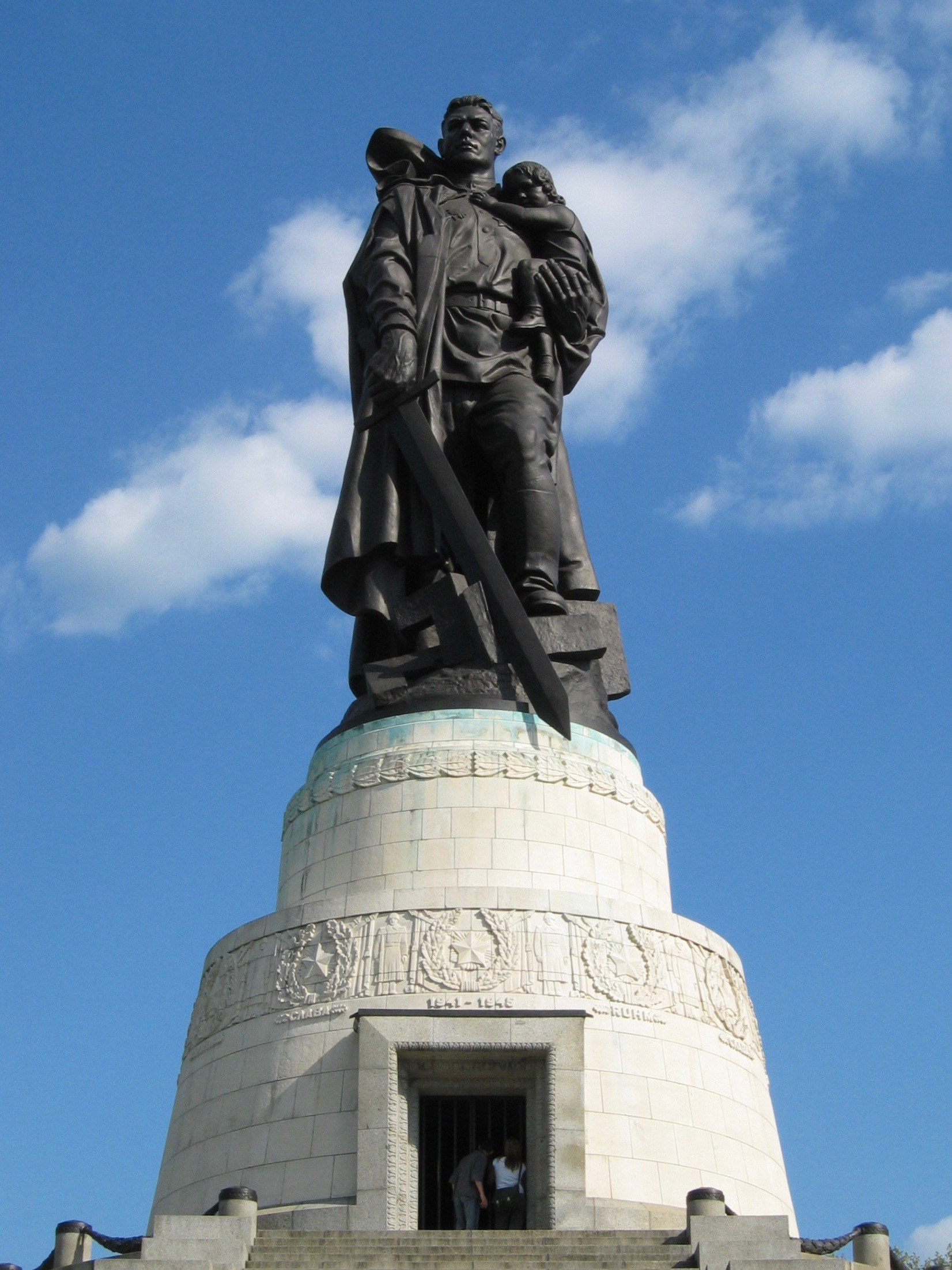
- Artist: Yevgeny Vuchetich
- Year: 1949
- Location: Treptower Park Memorial; Berlin

The year 1949 was marked by many events that left an imprint on the history of Soviet and Russian fine arts.

== Events ==
- January 1 — The Fine Art Exhibition by Leningrad artists of 1947–1948 years opened in Russian museum. The participants were Evgenia Baykova, Lev Bogomolets, Alexander Lubimov, Yuri Neprintsev, Mikhail Natarevich, Samuil Nevelshtein, Gleb Savinov, Alexander Samokhvalov, Rudolf Frentz, Nikolai Timkov, and other important Leningrad artists.
- May 8 — a monument to the Soviet Soldier-liberator was unveiled in Treptower Park, Berlin. Authors of the monument sculptor Yevgeny Vuchetich.
- Exhibition of work by Alexander Lubimov opened in the Leningrad Union of Artists.
- November 5 — The All-Union Fine Art Exhibition of 1949 opened in Tretyakov gallery in Moscow. The participants were Mikhail Avilov, Nikolai Babasuk, Vasily Baksheev, Piotr Belousov, Fiodor Bogorodsky, Piotr Vasiliev, Nina Veselova, Sergei Gerasimov, Aleksandr Gerasimov, Aleksei Gritsai, Aleksandr Laktionov, Boris Ioganson, Alexander Kuprin, Vladimir Malagis, Dmitriy Nalbandyan, and other important Soviet artists.

== See also ==
- List of Russian artists
- List of painters of Leningrad Union of Artists
- Saint Petersburg Union of Artists
- Russian culture
- 1949 in the Soviet Union

== Sources ==
- Всесоюзная художественная выставка 1949 года. Живопись. Скульптура. Графика. Каталог. Издание второе. М., Государственная Третьяковская галерея, 1950.
- Отчетная выставка произведений живописи, скульптуры и графики за 1947-1948 годы. Каталог. Л., Ленизо, 1949.
- Любимов Александр Михайлович. Выставка произведений. Каталог. Л., ЛССХ, 1949.
- Artists of Peoples of the USSR. Biography Dictionary. Vol. 1. Moscow, Iskusstvo, 1970.
- Artists of Peoples of the USSR. Biography Dictionary. Vol. 2. Moscow, Iskusstvo, 1972.
- Выставки советского изобразительного искусства. Справочник. Т.4. 1948—1953 годы. М., Советский художник, 1976.
- Directory of Members of Union of Artists of USSR. Volume 1,2. Moscow, Soviet Artist Edition, 1979.
- Directory of Members of the Leningrad branch of the Union of Artists of Russian Federation. Leningrad, Khudozhnik RSFSR, 1980.
- Artists of Peoples of the USSR. Biography Dictionary. Vol. 4 Book 1. Moscow, Iskusstvo, 1983.
- Directory of Members of the Leningrad branch of the Union of Artists of Russian Federation. - Leningrad: Khudozhnik RSFSR, 1987.
- Artists of peoples of the USSR. Biography Dictionary. Vol. 4 Book 2. - Saint Petersburg: Academic project humanitarian agency, 1995.
- Link of Times: 1932 - 1997. Artists - Members of Saint Petersburg Union of Artists of Russia. Exhibition catalogue. - Saint Petersburg: Manezh Central Exhibition Hall, 1997.
- Matthew C. Bown. Dictionary of 20th Century Russian and Soviet Painters 1900-1980s. London, Izomar, 1998.
- Vern G. Swanson. Soviet Impressionism. Woodbridge, England, Antique Collectors' Club, 2001.
- Время перемен. Искусство 1960—1985 в Советском Союзе. СПб., Государственный Русский музей, 2006.
- Sergei V. Ivanov. Unknown Socialist Realism. The Leningrad School. Saint-Petersburg, NP-Print Edition, 2007. ISBN 5-901724-21-6, ISBN 978-5-901724-21-7.
- Anniversary Directory graduates of Saint Petersburg State Academic Institute of Painting, Sculpture, and Architecture named after Ilya Repin, Russian Academy of Arts. 1915 - 2005. Saint Petersburg: Pervotsvet Publishing House, 2007.
