= Veronika Skvortsova =

Russian neurologist and politician

- Вероника Скворцова
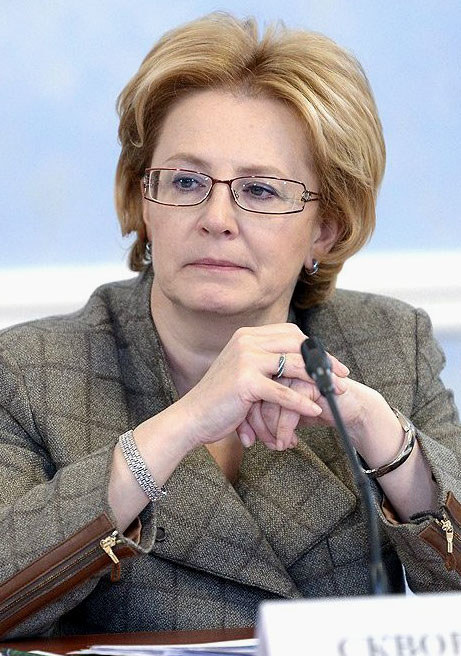
- Skvortsova in 2014

Minister of Health
- In office 21 May 2012 – 21 January 2020
- Preceded by: Tatyana Golikova
- Succeeded by: Mikhail Murashko

Personal details
- Born: 1 November 1960 (age 65) Moscow, Soviet Union
- Education: Russian National Research Medical University
- Profession: Neurologist; Doctor of Sciences in medicine

Veroníka Ígorevna Skvortsóva (Russian: Верони́ка И́горевна Скворцо́ва; born November 1, 1960, in Moscow) is a Russian neurologist and politician. She served as the Minister of Health of the Russian Federation from 21 May 2012 to 15 January 2020.

== Biography ==
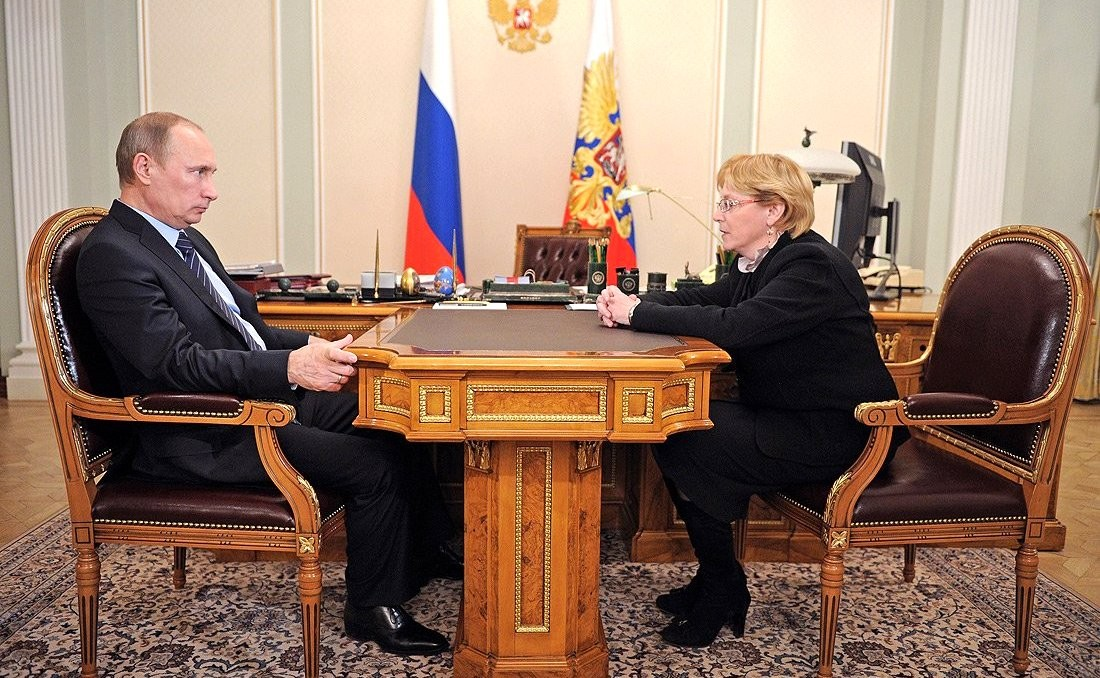
Skvortsova meeting with President Vladimir Putin on 21 January 2013

Born into a family of doctors, a physician in fifth generation, She graduated from school with a gold medal in 1977. In 1983, she graduated from training at the pediatric department of the Second Moscow Medical Institute (today called Russian National Research Medical University). In 1988, she graduated from the same department and received her PhD. From 1988 to 1997 she worked as Medical Laboratory Assistant and associate professor. In 1999, she became one of the founders of the National Association for the Fight Against Stroke. Since 2005, she was director of the Research Institute for Stroke in the Russian National Research Medical University. In July 2008, she was appointed Deputy Minister of Health and Social Development of the Russian Federation. On May 21, 2012, she was appointed to the role of Minister of Health of the Russian Federation in Dmitry Medvedev's Cabinet. At the Seventieth World Health Assembly on May 11, 2017, she was elected 70th President of the World Health Organization, and only Ukraine protested her nomination. She has emphasized the importance of healthy lifestyles and noncommunicable diseases.

On 15 January 2020, she resigned as part of the cabinet, after President Vladimir Putin delivered the Presidential Address to the Federal Assembly, in which he proposed several amendments to the constitution. She was appointed as the Director of the Federal Medical-Biological Agency on 22 January.
