= Sergey Gaplikov =

Russian politician (born 1970)

- Сергей Гапликов
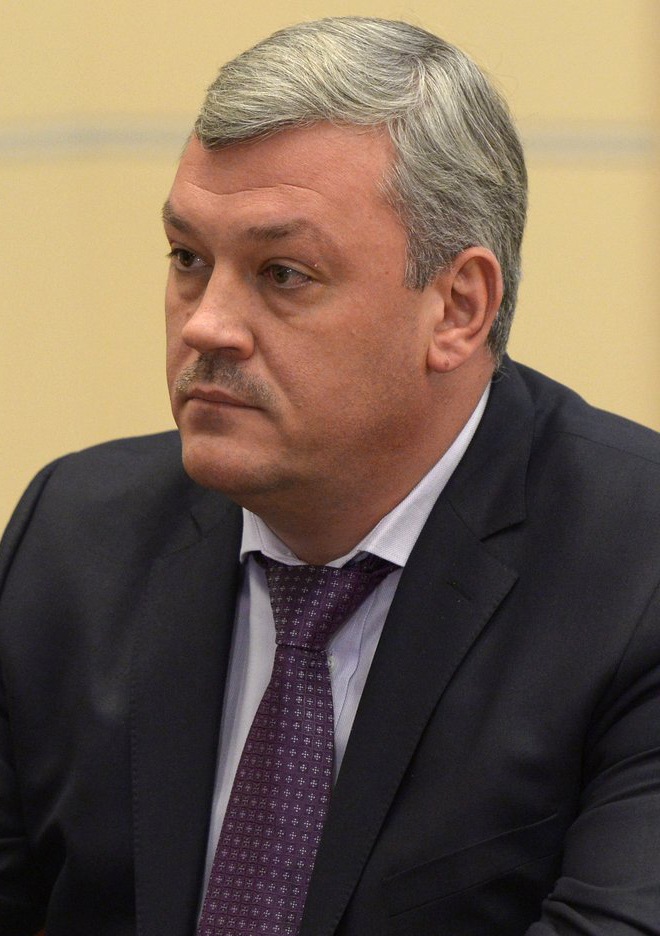
- Gaplikov in 2015

4th Head of the Komi Republic
- In office 30 September 2015 – 2 April 2020
- Preceded by: Vyacheslav Gayzer
- Succeeded by: Vladimir Uyba (Acting)

Personal details
- Born: October 29, 1970 (age 55) Frunze, Kirghiz SSR, USSR
- Party: United Russia
- Spouse: Galina Yevgenyevna Gaplikova
- Children: Daria Sergeyevna Gaplikova; Aleksandr Sergeyevich Gaplikov
- Occupation: Manager

Sergey Anatolyevich Gaplikov (Russian: Сергей Анатольевич Гапликов), born in 1970, is a Russian politician who served as Head of the Komi Republic from September 2015 to April 2020 when he resigned during the 2018–2020 Shies protests.

== Family ==
His family is based in Moscow. He has a wife, Galina Yevgenyevna, and their two children, Daria and Aleksandr.
