= Rostislav Goldshteyn =

Russian politician

- Ростислав Гольдштейн
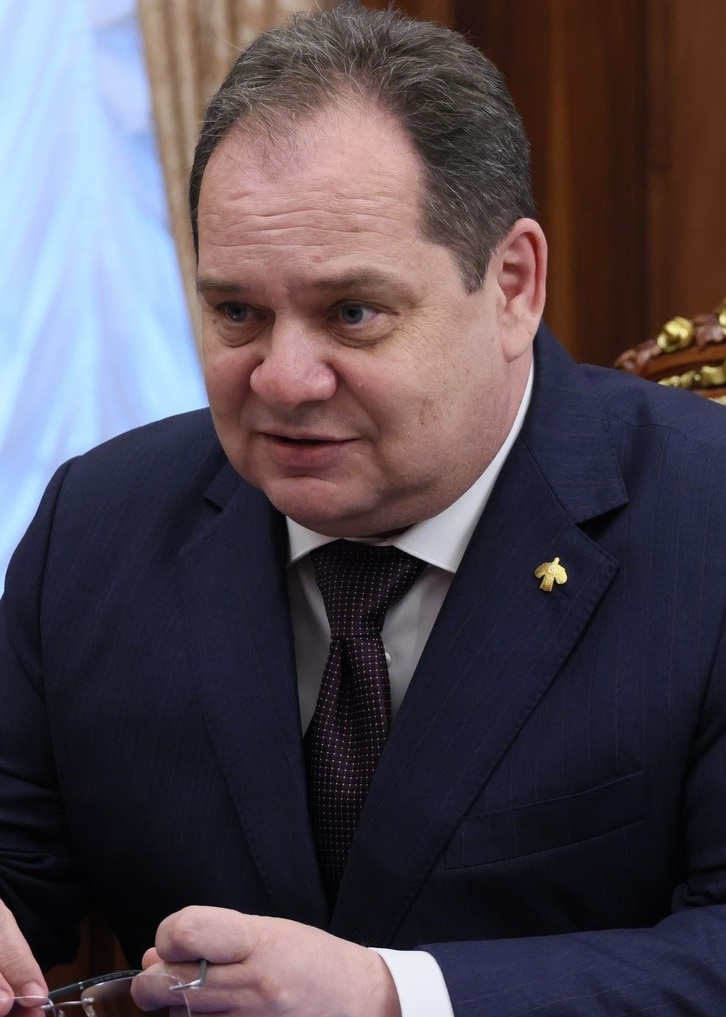
- Goldshteyn in 2025

Head of the Komi Republic
- Incumbent
- Assumed office 30 September 2025 (Note: Acting: 5 November 2024 – 30 September 2025)
- Preceded by: Vladimir Uyba

4th Governor of the Jewish Autonomous Oblast
- In office 12 December 2019 – 5 November 2024 (Note: Acting: 12 December 2019 – 22 September 2020)
- Preceded by: Alexander Levintal
- Succeeded by: Maria Kostyuk

Russian Federation Senator from the Jewish Autonomous Oblast
- In office 22 September 2015 – 23 December 2019
- Preceded by: Nikolay Volkov
- Succeeded by: Yuri Valyaev

Member of the State Duma
- In office 2 December 2007 – 22 September 2015

Personal details
- Born: Rostislav Ernstovich Goldshteyn; 15 March 1969 (age 57) Selizharovo, Kalinin Oblast, RSFSR, Soviet Union
- Party: United Russia
- Education: Russian Presidential Academy of National Economy and Public Administration

Rostislav Ernstovich Goldshteyn (Russian: Ростислав Эрнстович Гольдштейн; born 15 March 1969) is a Russian politician serving as Head of the Komi Republic since September 2025. He has previously served as the Governor of the Jewish Autonomous Oblast from 2019 to 2024, having served his first year in acting capacity. He is a member of the ruling United Russia party.

== Career ==
In 2003 and 2007 he was elected to the State Council of the Komi Republic.

In 2007 he participated in the elections to the State Duma on the regional list of United Russia, but did not enter parliament.

Since 2008 he has been deputy head of the State Duma Committee on Problems of the North and the Far East.

In 2011 he was elected a deputy of the State Duma of the VI convocation. He became Deputy Chairman of the Committee on Regional Policy and Problems of the North and the Far East.

In 2019-2024 he headed the Jewish Autonomous Oblast (JAO).

On 12 December 2019, by decree of Russian President Vladimir Putin, Rostislav Goldshteyn was appointed acting Governor of the JAO. On 13 September 2020 he was elected Governor of the Jewish Autonomous Region in direct elections.

On 5 November 2024, Goldshteyn was appointed as acting Head of the Komi Republic by President Vladimir Putin.

== Personal life ==
Goldshteyn was born on 15 March 1969, in Tver Oblast. He spent his childhood in the island of Sakhalin. In 1986, he worked as a mechanic at the Sakhalin State District Power Plant. From 1987 to 1989, he served in the Russian Army, later returning to his previous job.

In 1990 he got married. Since the beginning of the 1990s, together with his wife, he was engaged in private business. In 1995 he graduated from the Academy of Economics and Law (Ryazan) with a degree in Administrative Law and Economics. In 2001-2004, he was the general director of the Goldshteyn Trading House.

Goldshteyn is a candidate for the Master of Sports in boxing.

== Awards ==
- Medal of the Order "For Merit to the Fatherland", 2nd class
- Letter of Gratitude from the President of the Russian Federation
