= Vladimir Torlopov =

Russian politician

- Владимир Торлопов
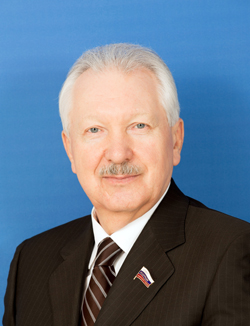

Russian Federation Senator from the Komi Republic
- In office 3 March 2010 – January 2014
- Preceded by: Igor Vasilyev
- Succeeded by: Dmitry Shatokhin

2nd Head of the Komi Republic
- In office 15 January 2002 – 15 January 2010
- Preceded by: Yury Spiridonov
- Succeeded by: Vyacheslav Gayzer

Chairman of the State Council of the Komi Republic
- In office 6 February 1995 – 15 January 2002
- Preceded by: Position established; Yury Spiridonov as chairman of the Supreme Council
- Succeeded by: Yevgeny Borisov

Personal details
- Born: 14 November 1949 (age 76) Syktyvkar, Komi ASSR, Russian SFSR, Soviet Union
- Party: Independent
- Other political affiliations: United Russia (2000s–2019); Beer Lovers Party (1994)
- Profession: Educator, politician

Vladimir Alexandrovich Torlopov (Russian: Владимир Александрович Торлопов; Komi: Торлопов Ӧльӧксан Володь, Torlopov Öľöksan Voloď; born 1949) is a Russian politician, who was the head of the Komi Republic, a federal subject of Russia. In December 2001, he won elections with 40% of the vote, defeating incumbent head Yury Spiridonov. Torlopov took office in January 2002 and left on 15 January 2010.

In 1995 he became Chairman of the State Council of the Komi Republic.

On October 6, 2016 it has been under house arrest for the creation and leadership of a criminal association in conjunction with the "grouping" Gayzer and fraud on a large scale using his official position. Torlopov pleaded guilty.

Political offices
Preceded by Yury Spiridonov	Head of the Komi Republic; 2002–2010	Succeeded by Vyacheslav Gayzer
