= Aleksandr Kharchikov =

Russian singer (1949–2023)

Aleksandr Kharchikov Александр Харчиков
- Born: 21 December 1949; Nikolsky District, Penza Oblast, Russian SFSR, USSR
- Died: 7 January 2023 (aged 73)
- Genre: Bard
- Occupations: Engineer; Singer; Poet; Public figure
- Instruments: Guitar; Synthesizer
- Website: harchikov.com

Aleksandr Kharchikov (Russian: Александр Харчиков; 21 December 1949 – 7 January 2023) was a Russian folk singer-songwriter noted for his controversial songs of Stalinist, nationalist, anti-Ukrainian and antisemitic nature. He is considered a hero and patriot by Nazbol and neo-Stalinist groups in Russia.

== Biography ==
Alexandr Kharchikov was born on 21 December 1949, in the village of Kensha, in Penza Oblast. He attended primary school in Saransk before enlisting in the Navy. During his naval service, he participated in 1968 in the Sinai war between Israel and Egypt, on the Egyptian side, and claimed to have been wounded. He graduated in 1974 from the Mordovian state University as an electronic engineer. Kharchikov, as a Saint Petersburg resident, was a leader of the 17 March movement proclaiming the "implementation of the March 17, 1991, referendum on future of the USSR" as its goal.

== Career ==
Kharchikov achieved notoriety in the 1990s after his participation in a TV broadcast of the program "600 seconds", after which his cassette tapes and later CDs achieved wide circulation. He had a repertoire of nearly 300 songs, of which those with extreme chauvinist, nationalistic, Stalinist, antisemitic and anti-Ukrainian content became the best known part of his oeuvre, notably the "Aryan march" (a.k.a. "White Race") ("Арийский марш" ("Белая раса")), "Epistle to the Khokhly" ("Хохлам"), "Our Stalin – the father, Our Motherland, the mother" ("Нам Сталин – отец, нам Родина – мать!"), "Smite the kikes, smite the dandruffed ones!" ("Бей жидов! Бей пархатых!"), "Kikes rule over Russia" ("Россией правят жиды"), "Heart's Sorrow" ("To kikes") ("На сердце тоска" ("Жидам")), "Kill an American!" ("Убей американца"), "Finish off that Abrek!" ("Добей абрека"), "Do you think a Black one would spare you?" ("Думаешь, черный тебя пощадит?"). Kharchikov's aficionados, though, regard him as the modern Russia's great Songs of struggle bard. According to V. Vinogradov, he "accumulates in himself the energy of resistance and devotes his whole life to the one superior goal: that of fighting for Russia".

Kharchikov sang in a hoarse voice styled after the Russian bard Vladimir Vysotsky, self-accompanied on guitar, or occasionally a synthesizer. Kharchikov's own songs contain explicit exhortations to violence and are described as defined by "zoological antisemitism". His songs have been used as a soundtrack to numerous videos produced by Russian Neonazi groups. Many of these are available on YouTube. Although some see Kharchikov's songs as meeting the prosecutable criteria of Russia's criminal code (such as the articles that cover fomenting interethnic strife), up until January 2010 he had never been faced with legal action. This has led to widespread suspicions that he had the Russian government's tacit support.

In March 2012 the song by Kharchikov "Жиды хлебушка не сеют" ("Yids don't sow wheat") was declared extremist by a Russian federal court.

== Discography ==
- Виват, Империя ("Hail the Empire")
- Наша Родина — Советский Союз ("Our motherland – the Soviet Union")
- Выбор ("Choice")
- Любовь уходит ("Love leaves")
- Русским офицерам ("Russian officers")
- Анафема ("Anathema")
- Моряк — любимец Родины ("Sailor – the favorite of the Motherland")
- Погостили с тобой у березки ("Be with you under a tree")
- Товарищ генерал ("Comrade General")
- Когда на штурм? ("When is the assault?")
- Пена ("Foam")
- Гражданская война ("The Civil War")
- Победа ("Victory")
- За что вы гибнете, ребята ("For what are you dying, guys")
- ЛТП закрыли на ремонт ("The therapy center was close for repairs")
- Бредятина ("Bredyatina")
- Новые русские сказки ("New Russian fairy tales")
- Песни беды и надежды ("Songs about troubles and hopes")
- Русским женщинам ("Russian women")
- Бей фашистского гада ("Beat the fascist snake")
- С любовью ("With love")
- Нам нечего терять! ("We have nothing to lose!")
- Мы ждем своих ("We are waiting for them")
- Я помню ("I remember")
- Народу-победителю ("People-winner")
- Листаются страницы ("Flipping the page")
- Бывали хуже времена ("There has been worse times")
- Ой, Днипро, Днипро ("Oh, Dnipro, Dnipro")
- Будь Русским! ("Be Russian!")
- Не гляди назад ("Don't look back")
- Вглядись времени в лицо ("Look closely once")
- Иду на таран ("I'm going to crush")

== See also ==
- National Bolshevism
- Antisemitism
- Anti-Ukrainian sentiment
