= Head of the Komi Republic =

Highest-ranking official in the Komi Republic, Russia

- Коми республикаса Юралысь (Komi); Глава Республики Коми (Russian)
- Standard of the head of the republic

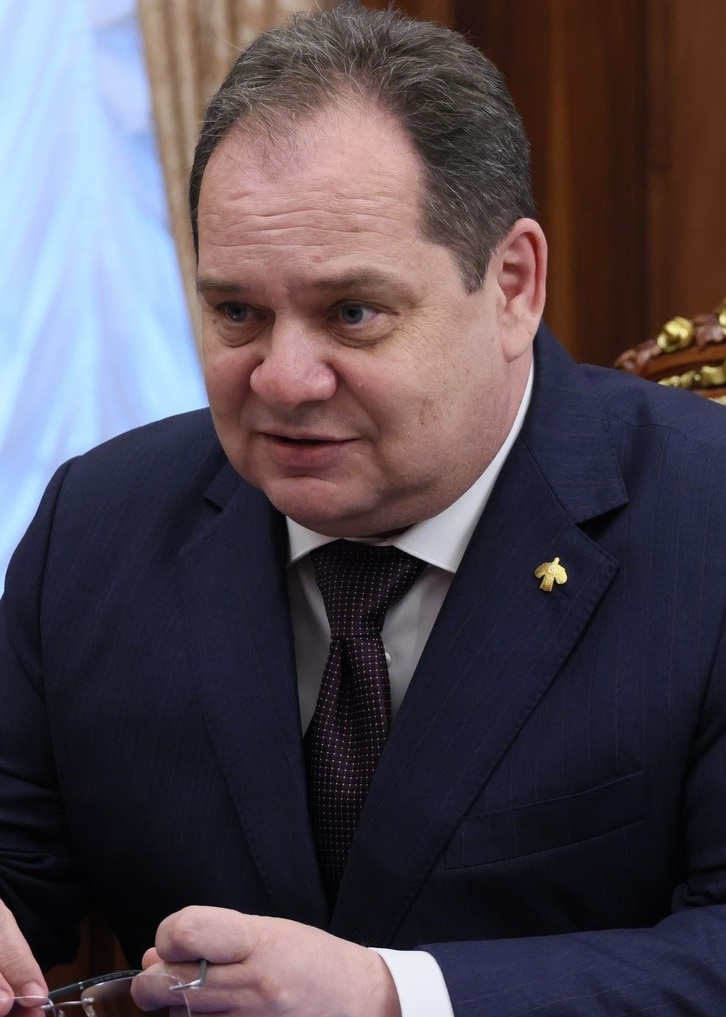
- Incumbent; Rostislav Goldstein since 30 September 2025
- Executive branch of the Komi Republic
- Style: His Excellency; The Honorable
- Type: Governor; Head of state; Head of government
- Residence: Syktyvkar
- Appointer: Direct elections
- Term length: 5 years; no more than two consecutive terms
- Formation: 1994
- First holder: Yury Spiridonov
- Website: Official website

Heads of the Komi Republic (Russian: Глава Республики Коми; Komi: Коми республикаса Юралысь) is the highest official of the Komi Republic, an autonomous region of Russia. The position was introduced in 1994. In previous years, from the establishment of the multi-party system in 1990, the Supreme Council of the Komi Republic was the highest authority, and its chairman acted as head of state. In 2012, term of office was increased from four to five years.

== List of the Heads ==
Below is a list of the Heads of the Komi Republic:

No.	Portrait	Name (born–died)	Term of office			Political party	Elected	Ref.
No.	Portrait	Name (born–died)	Took office	Left office	Time in office	Political party	Elected	Ref.
1		Yury Spiridonov (1938–2010)	7 June 1994	15 January 2002	7 years, 222 days	Independent	1994; 1997	
2		Vladimir Torlopov (born 1949)	15 January 2002	15 January 2010	8 years, 0 days	Independent	2001; 2005 (Note: Appointed by the president of Russia with the consent of the State Council.)	
2		Vladimir Torlopov (born 1949)	15 January 2002	15 January 2010	8 years, 0 days	United Russia	2001; 2005	
3		Vyacheslav Gayzer (born 1966)	15 January 2010	14 January 2014	3 years, 364 days	United Russia	2010	
–		Vyacheslav Gayzer (born 1966)	14 January 2014	19 September 2014	248 days	United Russia	– (Note: Acting head of the republic)	
(3)		Vyacheslav Gayzer (born 1966)	19 September 2014	30 September 2015	1 year, 11 days	United Russia	2014	
–		Sergey Gaplikov (born 1970)	30 September 2015	22 September 2016	358 days	United Russia	–	
4		Sergey Gaplikov (born 1970)	22 September 2016	2 April 2020	3 years, 193 days	United Russia	2016	
–		Vladimir Uyba (born 1958)	2 April 2020	23 September 2020	174 days	Independent	–	
5		Vladimir Uyba (born 1958)	23 September 2020	5 November 2024	4 years, 43 days	United Russia	2020	
–		Rostislav Goldstein (born 1969)	5 November 2024	30 September 2025	329 days	United Russia	–	
6		Rostislav Goldstein (born 1969)	30 September 2025	Incumbent	342 days	United Russia	2025	

== Election results ==
=== Last election ===
Last election for the post was held on 13 September 2020.

Candidates	Party	Votes	%
Vladimir Uyba	Independent, supported by United Russia	145,058	73.18
Andrey Nikitin	Liberal Democratic Party	21,463	10.83
Sergey Ponomaryov	Communist Party of Social Justice	11,355	5.73
Victor Betekhtin	Green Alternative	11,315	5.71
Turnout:		198,490	30.16

=== 2016 elections ===
The 2016 elections were held on election day 18 September.

Candidates	Party	Votes	%
Sergey Gaplikov	United Russia	174,567	62.17
Ivan Filipchenko	Liberal Democratic Party	29,579	10.53
Leonid Musinov	Communist Party	29,122	10.37
Vyacheslav Popov	A Just Russia	27,896	9.93
Andrey Pyatkov	Patriots of Russia	7,115	2.53
Turnout:		281,141	40.67

=== 2014 elections ===
The 2014 elections were held on election day 14 September.

Candidates	Party	Votes	%
Vyacheslav Gayzer	United Russia	324,439	78.97
Andrey Andreyev	Communist Party	28,147	6.85
Mikhail Bragin	Liberal Democratic Party	28,141	6.85
Ilya Velichko	A Just Russia	12,342	3.00
Evgeny Vologin	Right Cause	10,048	2.45
Turnout:		411,611	59.06

=== 2001 elections ===
The 2001 elections were held on 16 December.

Candidates	Party	Votes	%
Vladimir Torlopov	Independent	146,934	39.75
Yury Spiridonov	Independent	129,078	34.92
Leonid Musinov	Communist Party	23,032	6.23
Alexander Nekrasov	Liberal Democratic Party	8,523	2.31
Mikhail Kodanyov	Independent	7,429	2.01
Ivan Ruban	Unity	5,925	1.60
Leonid Kochanov	Independent	1,728	0.47
Against all		35,652	9.64
Turnout:		369,670	48.34

=== 1997 elections ===
Results by district: Spiridonov

The 1997 elections were held on 30 November. A proposition to hold a snap election was made by incumbent head of the republic, Yury Spiridonov, concerned about possible low voter turnout during the summer. The Communist Party officially supported member of the State Council Vasily Kuznetsov, although many local party chapters decided to endorse independent State Duma member Rita Chistokhodova.

Candidates	Party	Votes	%
Yury Spiridonov	Independent	215,620	57.19
Rita Chistokhodova	Independent/Communist Party (local)	74,757	19.83
Vasily Kuznetsov	Communist Party (federal)	34,587	9.17
Vyacheslav Krusser	Beer Lovers Party	7,008	1.86
Valery Zlobin	Liberal Democratic Party	2,943	0.78
Mikhail Kodanyov (withdrew)	Honour and Homeland	0	0.00
Against all		20,472	5.43
Invalid ballots		21,647	5.74
Turnout:		377,034	48.30

=== 1994 elections ===
The 1994 elections were held on 8 May.

Candidates	Party	Votes	%
Yury Spiridonov	Independent	–	50.98
Vyacheslav Khudyaev	Communist Party	–	33.14
Alexander Gladkov	Independent	–	8.39
Valery Markov	Independent	–	3.79
Turnout:		–	36.80

== Sources ==
- From the history of elections of the Head of the Komi Republic
