= Komi Autonomous Soviet Socialist Republic =

Autonomous republic of the Soviet Union

Komi Autonomous Soviet Socialist Republic Коми Автономная Советская Социалистическая Республика (Russian) Коми Автономнӧй Сӧветскӧй Социалистическӧй Республика (Komi-Zyrian)
- ASSR of the Russian SFSR; Republic of the Russian Federation
- 1936–1992
- Flag (1954–1991) Emblem (1978–1991)

- Capital: Syktyvkar
- Government
  - Type: Autonomous Soviet Socialist Republic
- History
  - Established: 5 December 1936
  - Sovereignty declared: 29 August 1990
  - Renamed to the Komi Republic: 26 May 1992
| Preceded by | Succeeded by |
| Komi-Zyryan AO | Komi Republic |

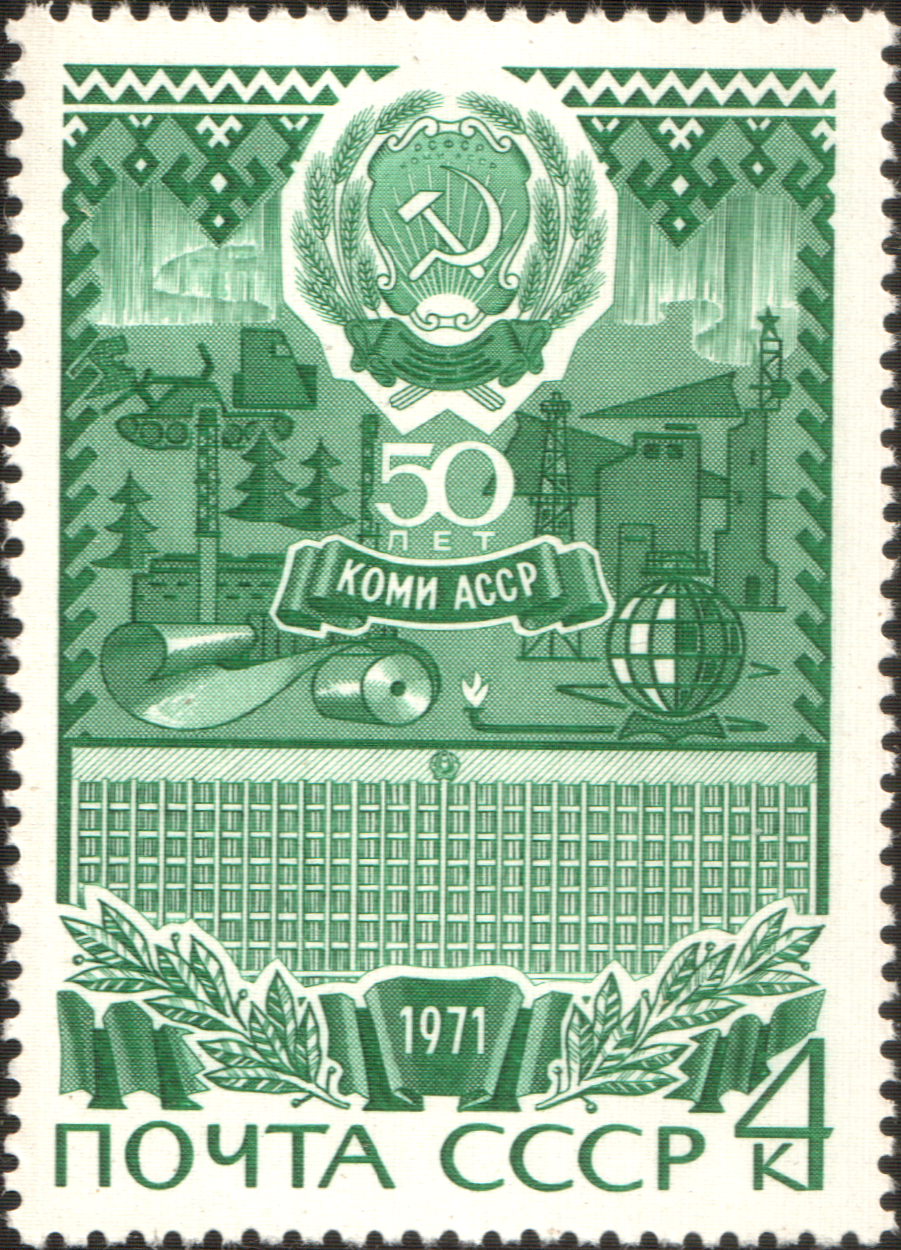
1971 stamp celebrating the Komi ASSR

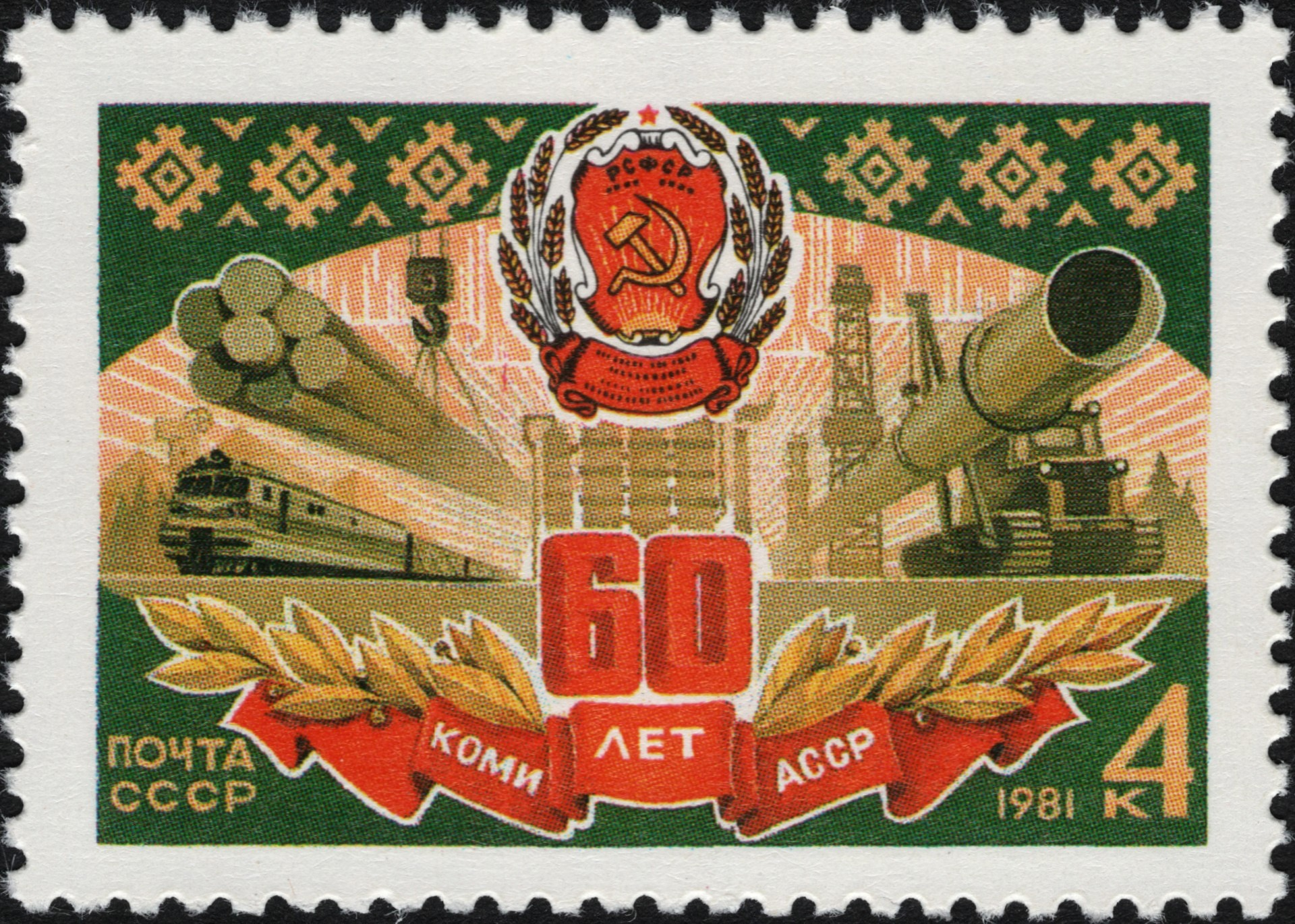
1981 stamp celebrating the Komi ASSR

The Komi Autonomous Soviet Socialist Republic (Russian: Коми Автономная Советская Социалистическая Республика; Komi: Коми Автономнӧй Сӧветскӧй Социалистическӧй Республика), abbreviated as Komi ASSR (Komi and Russian: Коми АССР), was an autonomous republic of the Russian SFSR within the Soviet Union, established on 5 December 1936 as successor of Komi-Zyryan Autonomous Oblast.

On 26 May 1992, it became the Komi Republic, a federal subject of Russia.

== See also ==
- Komi Regional Committee of the Communist Party of the Soviet Union
